= 27 September 2008 Delhi bombing =

Terrorist attack in Delhi, India

- Location: Delhi, India
- Date: 27 September 2008; 14:15 IST (UTC+05:30)
- Attack type: Bombing
- Weapon: Crude bombs
- Deaths: 3
- Injuries: 23

The 27 September 2008 Delhi bombing in India's second largest metropolis left three people dead and twenty-three more injured, on an infamous Saturday. The explosion occurred at 14:15, in Mehrauli's Electronic market called Sarai. Initially, there were reports of two persons, including a thirteen-year-old boy, named Santosh being killed in the attack. However, the next day the death toll rose to three. About 23 others were injured and were treated at AIIMS and Fortis Hospital. The bombing took place exactly two weeks after the five serial blasts in Delhi on 13 September 2008.

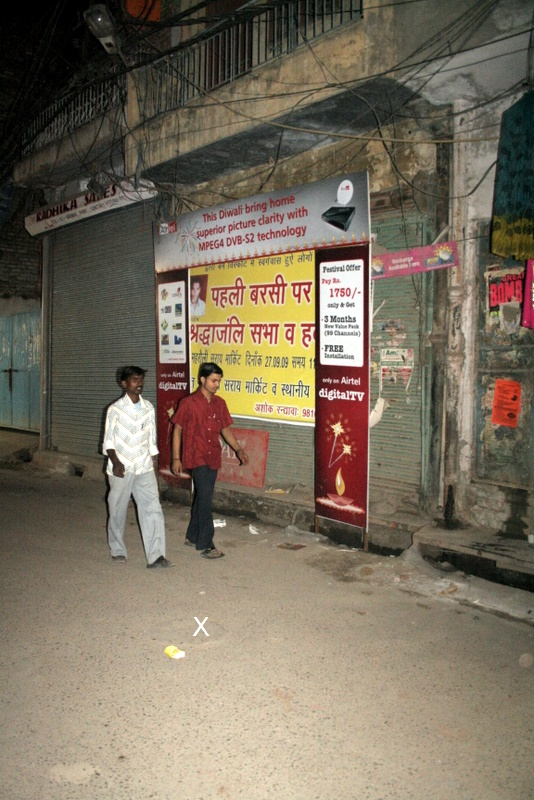
Mehrauli Bomb Spot One year after

== The blast ==
Eyewitnesses reported that the blast took place after two men in black dress and wearing helmets and riding a motorcycle dropped a tiffin box in which the bomb was placed. A thirteen-year-old boy named Santosh, who was running an errand for his uncle, to fetch a crate of eggs, picked up the box in an attempt to return it to the bikers, but they refused and fled. People nearby witnessed smoke coming out of the box and advised the boy to get away, but it was too late. The resulting explosion killed the boy and injured 18 others. Santosh's mother Rekha was inconsolable. The locals of Ward No.8, shopkeepers by profession, could not contain their anger at the poor security arrangements and investigation, in spite of the five horrific blasts which had taken place on 13 September 2008, in four places in Delhi. The Washington Post reported that seven of them were in critical condition. The police said that the blast was similar to those near IIT Delhi and Lado Sarai in January and February respectively this year.

== Aftermath and reaction ==
The Chief Minister of Delhi declared a compensation of Rs. 500,000 to the kin of the dead and Rs. 50,000 plus all costs of treatment to those injured. The blast was condemned by several Indian politicians including Pranab Mukherjee and Lal Krishna Advani. Main opposition party, the Bharatiya Janata Party (BJP), accused the government of India of being soft on terror. Indian External Affairs Minister Pranab Mukherjee said, "The Government is determined to wean out the culprits."

The series of attacks across major Indian cities since May 2008 reportedly created a sense of fear and insecurity among India's populace. According to a survey held by CNN-IBN and Hindustan Times, 81% of urban Indians felt scared after the recent surge in terror attacks. Of those who were surveyed, 90% said that India needed much stronger laws to tackle terrorism, while the remainder said India did not need any such tougher laws.

The Hindu reported that usually crowded shopping areas in Delhi bore a deserted look during the weekend as a consequence of the blast. According to the Indian Express, shopkeepers had kept away from the flower market in Mehrauli, the blast site.

Following the blast, the security arrangements for the Australian cricket team, currently on a tour of India, was tightened. Cricket Australia was reported to be reviewing security arrangements in Delhi where it is scheduled to play a test match against Indian cricket team in late October 2008. However, in a statement Cricket Australia said that the test match in Delhi will go ahead as per schedule.

== Investigation ==
According to the Hindu, two men on a motorcycle wearing black shirts, jeans and helmets planted the bomb. Investigating authorities revealed that ammonium nitrate, sulphur and potassium were used to cause the low-intensity blast.

A team of National Security Guards was deployed to assist the investigating authorities. Delhi Police had detained five persons at the Indira Gandhi International Airport whom they suspected of having a role in the blast. According to Hindustan Times, the police also selected several Bangladeshis for interrogation. NDTV said that there was a possibility that the attack was not carried out by the Indian Mujahideen, which claimed responsibility for the serial attacks in Delhi two weeks before, since the bomb which went off in Mehrauli was quite different.

Police in Faridabad had identified and held the man who sold the SIM card to the terrorists from which the attackers had made a call to media agencies threatening another terror strike moments before the blast. The police also detained the person whose cell phone was used to make the call. The police across NCR had increased patrolling at various access points. The Deputy Commissioner of Police for Delhi, Alok Kumar, said, "The evidence collected so far indicates that the bomb had no timer or detonator and it was low-intensity. We do not think it was linked to the Indian Mujahideen or any other terror group. In the recent past, in the stretch between the IP flyover and the Andheria road-junction in Mehrauli, there have been instances when bike-borne youths have dropped bombs in crowded streets." The Indian Express revealed that the bomb was quite similar to those made by Abdul Karim Tunda, an alleged terrorist who has been linked to several prior terrorist attacks in India.

The police also reported that they had received a call before the blasts saying, "Save Delhi, there will be blast!"

Unlike the Mehrauli and Malegaon blasts investigations, police in Delhi have ruled out Hindu groups as having perpetrated the blasts, a move drawing increasing polarisation as a result of the aforementioned investigation. The groups had been "under the scanner." The police cited their ruling out of the Hindu groups as the "signature (type) of the explosive used in Mehrauli was different from those used in Modasa and Malegaon." He did add that while "Low-intensity explosives were used in [all] three places... they were not identical. The timer mechanism used in Mehrauli was different from the one used in Malegaon/Modasa that indicates the former was the handiwork of a separate outfit. In Mehrauli, the bomb was timed by its acidic contents, while in Malegaon/Modasa the bomb was set off by a timer based on the batteries of the bikes used to plant them."

== See also ==
- List of terrorist incidents in 2008
- Jaipur bombings
- Bangalore bombings
- 2008 Ahmedabad bombings
- 13 September 2008 Delhi bombings
- 29 September 2008 western India bombings
