= Abdul Subhan Qureshi =

Former NIA Most Wanted terrorist

Abdul Qureshi
- Born: Abdul Haji Usman Qureshi; 19 July 1972 (age 53); Rampur, Uttar Pradesh, India
- Other names: Abdul Usman Qureshi, Kasim, Zakir, Qab, Touqeer
- Organization: Indian Mujahideen
- Spouse: Arifa Begum Qureshi
- Date apprehended: 22 January 2018

Abdul Qureshi (born 1972) is an Indian Islamist militant who is one of the most wanted terrorists in India and has been called India's Osama Bin Laden. He is suspected to be associated with the Students Islamic Movement of India (SIMI), and is thought to have been responsible for participating in the Bangalore, Ahmedabad and Delhi bombings. He is also a suspect in the 11 July 2006 Mumbai train bombings. He is more commonly known as Tauqeer and is believed to be the signer in the Indian Mujahideen terror email as al-Arabi. Abdul Subhan Qureshi was arrested by Delhi Police in January 2018. He was listed on the NIA Most Wanted list.

== Background ==
His Father Haji Usmaan Qureshi & Mother Zubeida Begum Qureshi who hailed from Rampur of Jabalpur district in Madhya Pradesh state migrated to Mumbai. He finished his SSC (class X) from an institution run by an Islamic trust in Byculla in Mumbai. He graduated from the Antonio DeSouza High School in 1988, obtaining a good Secondary School Certificate with 76.6% marks. His sisters, Shabana, Asma and Safia, have MA Degrees, his eldest sister Farha has been a columnist in an Urdu newspaper "Inquilab" & an independent novelist, his youngest sister Hafsa, studies at Sophia college, Mumbai and none of his three well-educated brothers Imran, Numaan & Salman appear to have ever been associated with SIMI.

In 1992 he began studies at the Bharatiya Vidyapeeth in Navi Mumbai. In 1995, he obtained a Diploma in Industrial Electronics, and got a part-time job at String Computers in Mazgaon. In 1996, he earned a specialised software maintenance training from the CMS Institute in Marol.

He joined Radical Solutions, a computer firm in the Fort area in South Mumbai in November 1996. He handled several major independent projects, including an intranet for Bharat Petro-Chemicals carried out by Wipro in 1999, and then joined Datamatics.

In a 26 March 2001 letter, he resigned with a letter stating "I wish to inform you, that I have decided to devote one complete year to pursue religious and spiritual matters".

Tauqeer married Arifa from Bandra in 1999 (or 2000). They moved to a flat at Mira Road in south Mumbai's Dongri area in 2000. On 21 August 2001, he participated in a SIMI press conference. He was video-recorded sitting beside Safdar Nagori.

In 2006, he is said to have severed contact with even his wife and three children, One son & two daughter named Hanzala, Zainab and Zaweria nicknamed "Juhi".

Arrested SIMI leader Safdar Nagori, has told police that he knew Qureshi and they had attended a religious function in Delhi in 2000. Nagori has also told them that Qureshi attended a two-day SIMI meeting in Karnataka's Hubli and another SIMI meet at a Kerala forest in October 2007.

Qureshi moved to Nepal using route of Ranchi and Raxaul in 2008 and stayed there up to 2015 in a disguise of an English teacher of a private school. With the help from Nizam Khan he got a Nepalese passport named as Abdul Rehman. In February 2015 he went to Saudi Arabia to meet Bhatkal. There he worked in a disguise of a salesman.

== Police claims ==
According to the Mumbai police investigators, by 1998, he appears to have been a committed SIMI activist. He was charged that year with defacing public property by pasting SIMI posters. Later, he edited SIMI's magazine, the Islamic Voice, from New Delhi.

Police sources told The Hindu that he participated in the October 1999 SIMI conference where Sheikh Yasin, the head of the Hamas and the Pakistan Jamaat-e-Islami chief Qazi Hussain Ahmad, were among those who delivered speeches through a telephone network.

In SIMI's 1999 Aurangabad convention which Qureshi is believed to have helped organize, many of the speeches delivered by delegates are reported to have been inflammatory. "Islam is our nation, not India", said Mohammad Amir Shakeel Ahmad, one of the SIMI-linked Lashkar operatives arrested in 2005 for smuggling in military-grade explosives and assault rifles for a supposed planned series of attacks in Gujarat.

Qureshi is thought to have been one of the principal organisers of SIMI's last public conference in 2001 where SIMI leaders told the estimated 25,000 members that the time had come for Indian Muslims to launch an armed Jihad which would have the establishment of a Caliphate as its final aim.

== Statement by family ==
On 17 September 2008, his family held a press-conference in Mumbai. His mother Zubeda Qureshi claimed that she had not seen her son in seven years and did not think he was involved. She said if he was guilty, he should be hanged.

"We know Subhaan is innocent. We want him to come forward and clear his name".

The family lawyer Mubin Solkar however stated that the family does not wish to defend him and will cooperate with the administration.

== Arrest ==
In January 2018, Delhi police arrested Qureshi after a gun battle.

== See also ==
- 13 May 2008 Jaipur bombings
- 2008 Ahmedabad bombings
- 2008 Delhi bombings
- Safdar Nagori
