= Fasih Mohammed =

- Organization: Lashkar-e-Taiba
- Criminal charge: Terrorism

Fasih Mahmood aka Fasih Mohammed is an alleged member of Lashkar-e-Taiba, a Pakistan-based Islamist terror group. A native of Bihar, he is accused of committing terrorist attacks and recruiting members for terror related activities. He was arrested with suspected involvement with the 2010 Chinnaswamy Stadium blast in Bangalore and a terror attack near Jama Masjid (Delhi) in 2010 and is wanted by both Delhi and Karnataka Police.

== Early life ==
Mehmood, originally from Bihar's Darbhanga district, had moved to Saudi Arabia in 2007 after obtaining his Bachelor's in technology degree. He is an engineer by training.

== Militancy ==
Delhi Police sources claimed that Fasih Mahmood was involved with radicalizing Students Islamic Movement of India (Simi) into a deadly Indian Mujahideen (IM).

Some of the suspects of 2010 Bangalore stadium bombing were later arrested from Darbhanga, Bihar state. He was arrested in Saudi Arabia in May 2012.
