= Yasin Bhatkal =

Founder of the Indian Mujahideen, a terrorist organisation (born 1983)

- Born: Syed Mohammed Ahmed Zarar Siddibappa; 15 January 1983 (age 43); Bhatkal, Karnataka, India
- Other names: Shahrukh, Yusuf
- Education: Anjuman Hami-e-Muslimeen, Bhatkal
- Occupation: Co-founder of Indian Mujahideen
- Years active: 2007–2013
- Known for: 2010 Pune bombing 2010 Bangalore stadium bombing 2011 Mumbai bombings 2012 Pune bombings 2013 Hyderabad blasts
- Spouse: Zahida Irshad Khan (m. 2010)
- Status: Death row
- Allegiance: Indian Mujahideen
- Convictions: Waging war against nation, criminal conspiracy and murder (19 December 2016)
- Criminal charges: Sedition, criminal conspiracy
- Penalty: Death penalty

Details
- Date apprehended: 28 August 2013
- Imprisoned at: Tihar Jail, Delhi

Syed Mohammed Ahmed Zarar Siddibappa (born 15 January 1983), known as Yasin Bhatkal, is an Indian Islamist terrorist, who was the co-founder and leader of the proscribed terrorist organisation Indian Mujahideen (IM). Yasin along with Riyaz Bhatkal and Iqbal Bhatkal (brothers, unrelated to Yasin), (Note: All three are from Bhatkal in the Karnataka state of India, hence their nickname "Bhatkal".) among others, founded the terrorist organisation around 2005. The jihadist group has carried out several attacks against civilian targets in India and Yasin was notably personally involved in the 2010 Pune bombing, 2010 Bangalore stadium bombing, 2011 Mumbai bombings, 2012 Pune bombings and the 2013 Hyderabad blasts.

He is believed to have taken arms and explosives training at a terrorist training camp in Pakistan. He was listed on the NIA Most Wanted until his arrest on the India–Nepal border near Raxaul (close to Motihari), Bihar on 28 August 2013. He has been sentenced to death by a National Investigation Agency special court in Hyderabad on 19 December 2016 for his involvement in the 2013 Hyderabad blasts and is currently incarcerated at the Tihar Jail in Delhi.

== Early life ==
Ahmed Siddibapa was born on 15 January 1983 to Zarar Siddibappa and Rehana Siddibappa in Bhatkal, Karnataka. He studied until the 10th grade at the Anjuman Hami-e-Muslimeen in Bhatkal, Karnataka. After not being able to clear his 10th-grade examination he left for Dubai in November 2005. According to his family, Ahmed disappeared from Dubai in January 2007.

In 2010, he married Zahida Irshad Khan (born c. 1988 in Samastipur, Bihar) in New Delhi with whom he has several children. He told her that he was Imran hailing from Lucknow. Since 2010, he had been living in the guise of a unani doctor (hakeem), Dr. Shahrukh (or Yusuf), in Pokhara, Nepal.

== Terrorism ==
He became the operational head of Indian Mujahideen when Riyaz and Iqbal Bhatkal fled post the Batla House encounter in 2008. He set up a bomb manufacturing facility in Delhi which were later used in the Delhi bombings, he had been detained for theft in 2009 in Kolkata but was let off after cops could not identify him. He also founded a terror module of the Indian Mujahideen in Darbhanga, Bihar and another in Ranchi, Jharkhand. Yasin is accused of direct involvement in over 10 separate bombings in India. These include the 13 September 2008 Delhi bombings, 2010 Varanasi bombing, and the 2011 Delhi bombing. He is also suspected to have played an active role in the 2006 Mumbai train bombings.

Bhatkal was also involved in the 2008 Ahmedabad bombings. According to Ahmedabad Crime Branch, Bhatkal arrived in Ahmedabad in July 2008, where he rented a house in Danilimda along with Asadullah Akhtar alias Haddi. The bombs used to carry out the series of 21 bomb blasts in the city on 26 July 2008 were made in the rented premises.

He was caught on CCTV while carrying out the 2012 Pune bombing and the 2013 Hyderabad blasts. Indian Investigators suspect Yasin, had planted one of the bombs on Jangli Maharaj road on 1 August, when four low-intensity blasts occurred in Pune.

== Capture and interrogation ==
Yasin was traced and detained at the India–Nepal border in Nepal near Raxaul, Bihar by a team of undercover Indian police on 28 August 2013 following the 2013 Hyderabad blasts. It was a joint operation between the Intelligence Bureau and the Bihar Police. He was the second big catch for Indian security agencies after the arrest of Abdul Karim Tunda, a key Lashkar-e-Taiba operative and expert bomb-maker, who was arrested from the India–Nepal border on 16 August. "He is presently in the custody of Bihar Police. His interrogation is going on", the home minister Sushilkumar Shinde had said at the time. The arrest of Yasin was seen as a major breakthrough in the law enforcement agencies protracted efforts against the Indian Mujahideen. "This is the biggest success after the Batla House operation, following which the IM was forced to slow down its activities," an intelligence official had said.

On 31 August 2013, during initial police interrogation, Bhatkal admitted to recruiting young men from Bihar for terror attacks across the country. He admitted his involvement in carrying out the 2011 Mumbai bombings, stating that he was the mastermind behind the blasts and is unremorseful.

Yasin and his associate Asadullah Akhtar, who was captured with Yasin in 2013, was flown from Delhi to Ahmedabad by a special Border Security Force (BSF) plane on 6 April 2017 for interrogation by the Ahmedabad Crime Branch which had sought a transfer warrant for both men in August 2013, accusing them involvement in the 2008 Ahmedabad bombings.

== Trial and sentencing ==
The NIA filed two chargesheets against Bhatkal, Zia-ur-Rehman alias Waqas, Asadullah Akhtar alias Haddi, Tahaseen Akhtar and Aijaz Sheikh in 2014 in the 2013 Hyderabad blasts case. The NIA alleged that "Bhatkal, along with other conspirators, developed different modules and sleeper cells in Delhi, Darbhanga in Bihar, Nanded, Mumbai, Pune, Bhatkal in Karnataka and Hyderabad." All five men were put on trial in the NIA court at Cherlapally Central Jail. The trial began in August 2015 and concluded on 7 November 2016. During the trial, a total of 158 witnesses were examined, 201 pieces of material evidence were seized, and over 500 documents were produced in court. All five men were found guilty by the court on 13 November. They were convicted under Indian Penal Code sections 120-B (criminal conspiracy), 121 (waging war against the country) and 121-A (conspiracy to wage war), as well as the Arms Act and various sections of the Unlawful Activities (Prevention) Act and were given a death-sentence.

Bhatkal is currently lodged at the Tihar Jail in Delhi.

On 8 April 2025, the Telangana High Court upheld Bhatkal and the other four co-defendants' death sentences in the 2013 Hyderabad blasts case, deeming it to be fitting for the "rarest of the rare" category.

== Arms training in Pakistan ==
Indian intelligence sources claim that Yasin Bhatkal entered Pakistan in early 2006 on a regular commercial flight from Dubai even though he did not have a visa and was whisked away from the aircraft by his contacts to avoid immigration checks. Yasin was taken to a hilly region with little habitation around, about 8–10 hours from Karachi and believed to be somewhere in the Pakistani province of Balochistan. "Next day our training started. There were six instructors, who I understand were from Pakistan army," he said after his arrest, adding that he and some other recruits were taught to handle weapons and explosives and make bombs during the training that lasted about 50 days. Yasin has told interrogators that he spent about 50 days in Pakistan undergoing training to launch terror attacks and returned to Dubai in the same manner after his hosts stamped his passport with fake immigration stamps to show that he had entered and exited India.

== Popular culture ==
The Indian films Kabir (2018), India's Most Wanted (2019) and Wild Dog (2021) and the Indian web series Indian Police Force (2024) are inspired from his arrest after a long manhunt; he is portrayed by Sudev Nair and Bilal Hossein in the films respectively.
