= MCOC =

MCOC may refer to:

- Maharashtra Control of Organised Crime Act, a law in India
- Marvel Contest of Champions, a video game for Android and iOS
