= 2013 Hyderabad blasts =

Terrorist attacks at a market in India

2013 Hyderabad bombings
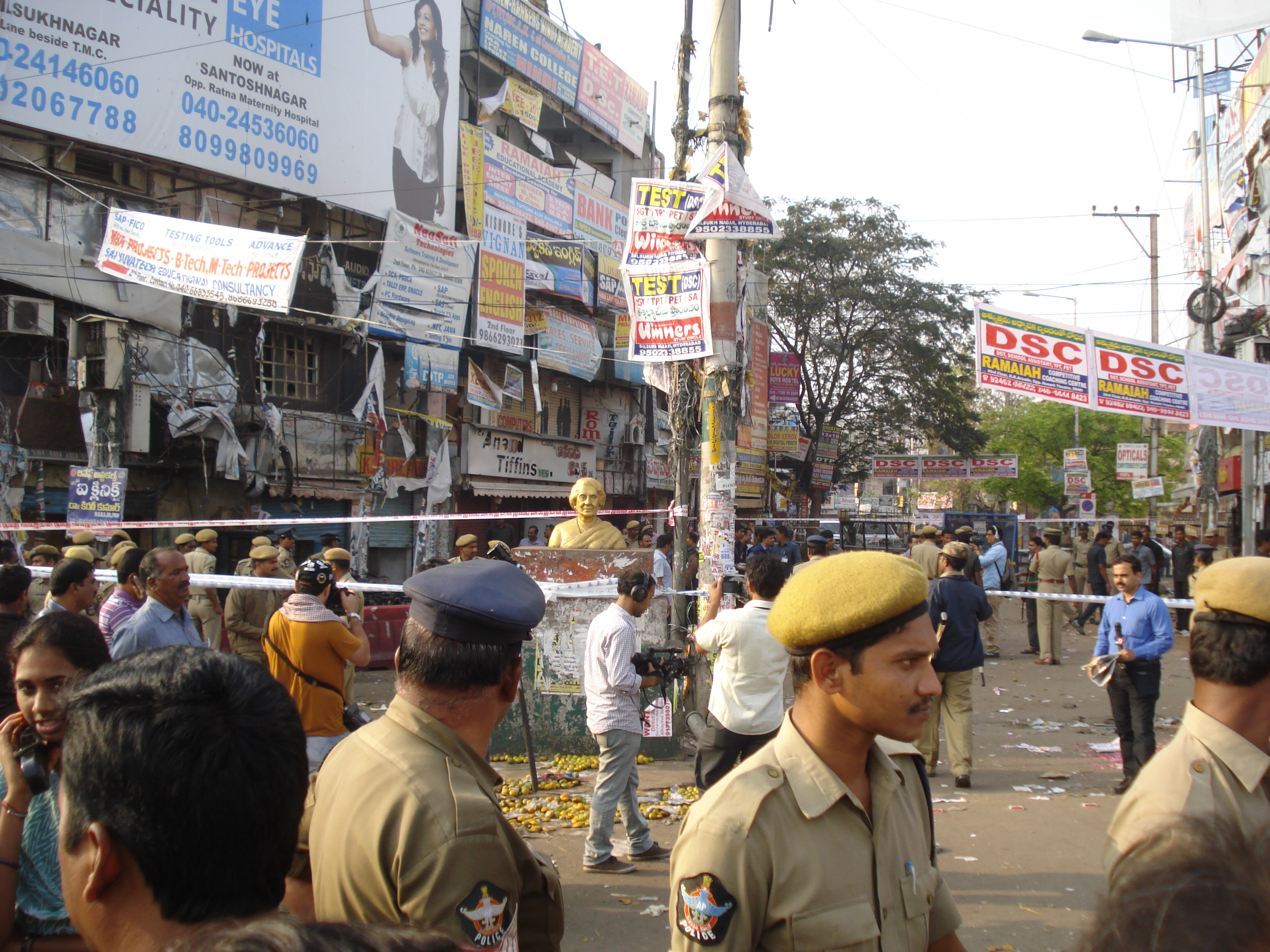
- Place

- Location of Dilsukhnagar in Telangana. Inset shows Telangana in India.
- Location: 17.360106°N 78.473427°E; Dilsukhnagar, Hyderabad, India
- Date: 21 February 2013; 18:58 and 19:01 (IST (UTC+5.30))
- Attack type: Serial blast
- Weapon: Improvised explosive devices
- Deaths: 18
- Injuries: 131
- Perpetrator: Indian Mujahideen
- Charges: Arms Act, Explosive Substances Act and Prevention of Damage to Public Property Act
- Verdict: Death penalty
- Convictions: Waging war against nation, criminal conspiracy and murder
- Convicted: Yasin Bhatkal; Zia-ur-Rahman alias Waqas; Asadullah Akhtar alias Haddi; Tahaseen Akhtar alias Monu; Ajaz Shaikh

On 21 February 2013, at around 19:00 IST, two blasts occurred in the city of Hyderabad, India. The bombs exploded in Dilsukhnagar, a crowded shopping area, within 100 metres (330 ft) of each other. The first explosion occurred outside a roadside eatery named A1 Mirchi, next to the Anand Tiffin Centre and opposite the Konark movie hall, followed by the second one two minutes later near the Route 107 bus stand close to the Venkatadri theatre. In December 2016, Yasin Bhatkal - the co-founder of Indian Mujahideen, Pakistani national Zia-ur-Rahman, Asadullah Akhtar (who had been arrested with Bhatkal in 2013), Tahaseen Akhtar, and Ajaz Shaikh were sentenced to death by a National Investigation Agency special court (in Cherlapally Central Jail) for carrying out the attacks under the Arms Act, Explosive Substances Act and Prevention of Damage to Public Property Act. In 2025, the Telangana High Court also upheld their death sentence.

== Bombings ==
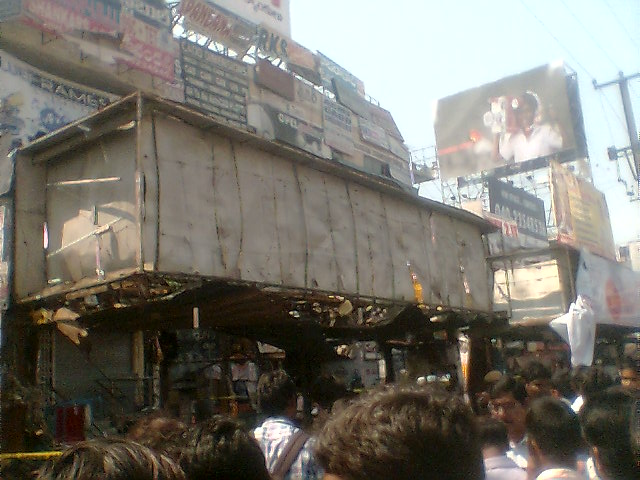
Destroyed bus shelter due to the first blast

The first bomb went off at Anand Tiffins, located opposite Konark Theatre at around 19:02 IST (UTC+05:30). The second bomb went off at 19:06 IST between Venkatadri Theatre and Dilsukhnagar Bus Stand. According to the Hyderabad Police, the bombs were placed on bicycles. Andhra Pradesh's Director General of Police noted that Improvised Explosive Devices (IEDs) had been used in the two blasts to cause maximum damage. The blasts killed 18 people, which included at least three college students and at least 119 injured.

== Investigation ==
A team of forensic experts from the National Investigation Agency (NIA) and the National Security Guard (NSG) arrived in Hyderabad on a plane provided by the Border Security Force (BSF) for further investigation. Home Minister Sushilkumar Shinde claimed that the Indian government had intelligence about possible blasts, but the information wasn't specific enough to pinpoint the location of the blast site. Shinde also said that authorities had received intelligence about possible attacks in the country but no specific information as to where or when they might occur.

CNN-IBN reported that an Indian Mujahideen operative named Maqbool confessed to carrying out reconnaissance of Dilsukhnagar in 2012 during interrogation by Delhi Police. Initial reports also suggested the involvement of Indian Mujahideen in the blasts. On 22 February, two First Information Reports (FIR) were lodged probing the attack. One FIR was lodged at Cyberabads Saroor police station, while the second was lodged in Hyderabad.

As the Hyderabad Police continued investigating in the serial blasts case, they detained six people for questioning. The NIA conducted raids at various places in Uttar Pradesh, Bihar and Maharashtra, looking for alleged terror modules. Forensic investigation revealed that the two bombs used were packed with huge amounts of iron nails and bolts and ammonium nitrate, which were held together with a copper string. Closed-circuit television footage collected from the traffic signal near the blast site revealed movements of five men who allegedly had planted explosives at the blast sites. However, the faces of the suspects were not clearly seen.

Police sources later said that a Sai Baba temple in the area was the initial target of the criminal activity. However, a visit by Hyderabad police commissioner Anurag Sharma eluded them and forced them to change their target. The Andhra Pradesh government claimed that it had obtained vital clues regarding the crime and would crack the case soon. Chief Minister Kiran Kumar Reddy sent out 15 special teams of Andhra Pradesh police, consisting of 10–15 personnel each. People lodged in the Chanchalguda Central Jail were also questioned regarding the blasts.

== Response ==
Major cities in India like Mumbai, New Delhi and Bangalore, along with states like Gujarat, Maharashtra and West Bengal were put on high alert after the blasts. The police of Andhra Pradesh were confronted with massive traffic jams when they tried to implement relief and rescue operations. Home secretary R. K. Singh stated that officials from the National Investigation Agency were shifted from Delhi to Hyderabad.

== Reactions ==
=== Domestic ===
President Pranab Mukherjee offered condolences to the bereaved families and condemned the blasts as "acts of cowardice". Prime Minister Manmohan Singh consoled the next of kin of those killed and seriously injured. The Chief Minister of Andhra Pradesh, Kiran Kumar Reddy, announced a compensation of ₹600,000 (US$6,200) to the next of kin of those killed in the blasts and promised to bear the medical expenses of the injured. Home Minister Sushilkumar Shinde visited the blast site on the morning of 22 February and said that an investigation had been launched by a probe team appointed by the Andhra Pradesh government.

On the next day, speaking in the Lok Sabha, Leader of the opposition and senior Bharatiya Janata Party (BJP) leader Sushma Swaraj said political parties must fight non-state terror unitedly while calling out the central and Andhra Pradesh governments for their failure to prevent the twin explosions. "The nation needs to be united, the political parties need to get united. The moment that happens, we will be capable of fighting terror," She controversially linked the twin blasts with a provocative speech made earlier by Akbaruddin Owaisi stating "Do these blasts have a connection with the provocative speeches made by an honourable member of this house?" which Asaduddin Owaisi (his brother) described as "unfortunate" and "irresponsible". The spokesperson for Bharatiya Janta Party Ravi Shankar Prasad said, "Several innocent lives have been lost in the Hyderabad blasts. The government should stop playing politics on the issue of terrorism. We want the government to take appropriate action. There should be better coordination between the Centre and the state governments. [..]This government should rise above vote-bank politics."

=== International ===
- United Nations – United Nations Secretary-General Ban Ki-moon issued a statement that condemned the attack and offered his condolences to the families of the victims. "The Secretary-General strongly condemns the indiscriminate attacks against civilians which occurred in the Indian city of Hyderabad."
- Australia – In a statement released through the Australian High Commission in New Delhi, Canberra said: "The government and people of Australia express their condolences and sympathy for victims of the bomb attacks in Hyderabad, India, on February 21. Australia condemns all acts of terrorism. These bombs appear to have been directed at innocent people, going about their daily business. Foreign Minister Bob Carr said he will be writing to India's Foreign Minister, Salman Khurshid, to express his support for India's efforts to prevent terrorist attacks," the statement added. "Our thoughts are with the families and friends of those killed or wounded," Senator Carr said.
- United States – The United States of America condemned the "cowardly attack" saying that it stood with India in battling the "scourge of terrorism" and offered its assistance in probing the incident. Secretary of State John Kerry personally expressed condolences at the loss of lives and condemned the attack on behalf of his country. In Kerry's first Twitter posting as secretary of state he wrote: "Saw friend/Foreign Secretary Mathai- discussed importance of relationship w/ #India, expressed sympathies to brave people of #Hyderabad -JK." State Department spokesperson Victoria Nuland stated ″We condemn the cowardly attack in Hyderabad, India, in the strongest possible terms, and we extend our deepest sympathies to those affected and to the people of India.″
- France – France condemned "in the strongest terms" the twin bombing in Hyderabad and said India can count on Paris' "steadfast support and cooperation" in the fight against terrorism. Conveying his heartfelt condolences to the victims' families on behalf of France, François Hollande, President of France expressed "his complete solidarity with the Indian people and the government in the fight against terrorism, for which they can count on France's steadfast support and cooperation".
- Pakistan – Foreign Ministry spokesman Moazzam Khan said: "Pakistan strongly condemns the bomb blasts in Hyderabad causing several deaths and injuries."
- Turkey – The Ministry of Foreign Affairs issued a statement that read: "We condemn this terrorist attack which killed innocent people. We wish God's mercy upon those who lost their lives, convey our condolences to their bereaved families and wish a speedy recovery to those wounded".

== See also ==
- Religious violence in India
- Islamic terrorism
- August 2007 Hyderabad bombings
