= Safdar Nagori =

Indian terrorist

- Born: 1969 (age 56–57); Mahidpur, Ujjain district, Madhya Pradesh, India
- Education: Vikram University
- Organization: Students Islamic Movement of India (SIMI)
- Title: General-Secretary of SIMI
- Criminal charges: Possession of illegal arms, ammunition and explosives Plotting terrorist activities
- Criminal penalty: Life imprisonment
- Criminal status: Incarcerated
- Father: Gahiruddhin Nagori
- Relatives: Kamruddin Nagori (brother)

Safdar Nagori (born 1969) was the General-Secretary of the Students Islamic Movement of India (SIMI), an Islamist organization designated as a terrorist organization by the Government of India.

On 27 February 2017, a court in Indore sentenced Nagori to life imprisonment for possession of illegal arms, ammunition and explosives, and plotting terrorist activities.

== Early life ==
Nagori was born in Mahedpur village in the Ujjain district of Madhya Pradesh in 1969. His father Gahiruddhin Nagori worked in the Ujjain Police Crime Branch, and retired at the rank of Assistant Sub Inspector in 2005. Safdar Nagori graduated with a Masters in Journalism from Vikram University, Ujjain in 1999 and was a merit holder. While at the university, he became state president of SIMI. His brother Kamruddin Nagori, was the chief of the SIMI's operations in Andhra Pradesh.

== Beliefs and ideology ==
In an interview with Sayantan Chakravarty in April 2001, five months before SIMI was banned by the government, he expressed his views.

Let me explain the concept of Jihad as detailed in the Quran. It is not when an individual is harmed but when an entire community finds itself collectively persecuted that the cry for Jihad is given. ... Warn. If nothing works then one is forced to revolt, take to arms.

...When we are told that there is a rashtrapita [Father of the Nation] in Gandhi, and another great statesman in Jawaharlal Nehru, we feel it is a direct attack on our fundamentals. Nehru wanted Muslims to recognise Ghulam Ahmed Qadiani as our Prophet. He was forcing us to alter our religious belief and we have no regard for such a man.

(In response to the question "you have openly eulogised Osama bin Laden") Not once, but dozens of times. We believe that he has shown great character in standing up to the Americans, the biggest terrorists in the world.

(In response to the question "At SIMI meetings speeches of Qazi Hussain Ahmad, the Jamaat-e-Islami chief in Pakistan, are played. Why?") We link up with him in Pakistan through phones and the speeches are amplified for the audience. The Qazi wants us to take Islam to non-Muslims.

When SIMI was banned in September 2001, Safdar Nagori told BBC that allegations that the organization had links with Islamic militant separatist groups were baseless.

== Militant activity ==
According to Indian newspaper Daily News and Analysis, Nagori became radicalized after the demolition of the Babri Masjid in 1992, and subsequent communal riots. He joined SIMI in 1993. His father, Gahiruddhin, disowned his son after learning of his activities. The first FIR against Nagori was filed in Indore in 1998. He was subsequently arrested and then released, after which he went into hiding.

In autumn of the 2000, Harun Rashid, Mohammad Sabahuddin and other SIMI cadre drawn by Nagori's network had begun training with the Hizb-ul-Mujahideen in Jammu and Kashmir. Graduates of the training went on to participate in several major terrorist operations. In July 2001, police in Maharashtra, Andhra Pradesh, Uttar Pradesh and New Delhi arrested 23 SIMI-linked terrorists. Four of those held turned out to have trained in Kishtwar. SIMI cadre have aided militant groups such as the Taliban, Lashkar-e-Taiba, Jaish-e-Mohammad and the Harkat ul-Jihad-e-Islami in carrying out terrorist activities.

In 2001, Nagori fell out with SIMI leadership. While several SIMI leaders urged the group to abandon terrorism and focus on academic and religious activities, Nagori advocated continuing terrorist activities. Nagori absconded shortly after SIMI was proscribed as terrorist organization by the Government of India on 27 September 2001. He spent a year in Delhi in 2001–02, before moving to Mumbai in 2003. Nagori then moved to Murshidabad, West Bengal where he would spend the next five years. In Murshidabad, Indian law enforcement officials believe that Nagori was training 200 people for Mullah Omar, the spiritual leader of the Taliban. Officials also state that his activities in at least five states, suggests that he must have created large local terrorist networks, some of which have been uncovered by the arrests of connected militants.

Nagori visited Hyderabad in early 2008.

== Conviction and sentencing ==
Safdar Nagori was arrested by Madhya Pradesh Police from a flat in Sanyogitaganj, Indore on 26 March 2008. Ten other SIMI militants, including his brother Kamruddin Nagori, were also arrested in the operation. Following a week of interrogation of the accused, they revealed the location of a farmhouse in Choral, 35 km from Indore, which was used as a training camp by SIMI militants. The police were told the camp trained SIMI members from Jharkhand, Kerala, Karnataka and some other states in physical exercise, combat and organisation philosophy. Police found arms, ammunition, radical literature in Urdu and Hindi and explosives at the farmhouse and arrested two more militants. Further investigations revealed the existence of SIMI's women's wing called Shaheen Force. Police also found 122 super-explosive gelatine sticks, 100 detonators and switchboards buried underground in Gawali village.

Nagori told investigators that SIMI had about 400 active members and 20,000 supporters. He also stated that SIMI militants received training in Jammu and Kashmir, alongside Hizbul Mujaheedin militants. Militants received training in several types of terrorist operations. Nagori also claimed that he had advocated for the inclusion of more women in SIMI.

On 11 February 2013, authorities at Sabarmati Central Jail in Ahmedabad, where Nagori was being held, discovered a 213-feet long tunnel that been dug from the prison cells in the Chhota Chakkar area of the jail. The tunnel extended up to the prison's garden. Jail authorities believe that prisoners intended to dig until the underground sewage line and use it to escape. Authorities claim that the attempt would have been unsuccessful as the prison's boundary wall extends 20 feet below ground, while the tunnel had a depth of just 6 feet. On 18 May 2013, Ahmedabad City Crime Branch charged Nagori, and 23 other prisoners, under Indian Penal Code (IPC) sections 130 (aiding escape of state prisoners), 225 (resistance or obstruction to lawful apprehension of another person) and 120 B (criminal conspiracy). All 24 accused are also accused in the 2008 Ahmedabad bombings.

Nagori, and the 10 other militants, were charged with sedition, possession of illegal arms, ammunition and explosives, and plotting terrorist activities. The laws violated include the relevant sections of the Arms Act, the Explosive Substances Act, the IPC, and the Unlawful Activities (Prevention) Act. They were convicted of all charges by a CBI Court in Indore. On 27 February 2017, special CBI Judge BK Paloda sentenced them to life imprisonment for possession of illegal arms, ammunition and explosives, and plotting terrorist activities.

Nagori, along with 17 SIMI militants, was charged by Kerala Police in a separate case for organizing an arms training camp at Thangalpara, Vagamon in December 2007. The case was originally registered in Mundakayam on 21 June 2008, but the investigation was transferred to the National Investigation Agency (NIA) in January 2010. The NIA chargesheet alleged that the accused participated in a "secret training camp" involving shooting practice, explosives training, besides "classes on jihad in India". On 15 May 2018, an NIA Court in Kochi convicted Nagori under different sections of the Unlawful Activities (Prevention) Act, the Explosive Substances Act and section 120-B (criminal conspiracy) of the IPC. Special NIA Judge Kauser Edappagath sentenced Nagori to 7 years rigorous imprisonment. The sentence will run concurrently with his life term.
