= 2010 Bangalore stadium bombing =

2010 terrorist incident in Bangalore, India

Coordinates: 12°58′43.7″N 77°35′58.4″E

- Location: M. Chinnaswamy Stadium Bangalore, Karnataka, India
- Date: 17 April 2010; 15:15 and 15:30 (UTC+5:30)
- Attack type: Bombings
- Weapon: 3 time-triggered IEDs
- Injuries: 15
- Perpetrator: Indian Mujahideen
- Accused: 14
- Verdict: 7 years imprisonment (for 3 facilitators)
- Convicted: 3

2010 Bangalore stadium bombing occurred on 17 April 2010 in M. Chinnaswamy Stadium, Bangalore, India before a 2010 Indian Premier League match between the Royal Challengers Bangalore and Mumbai Indians. Two bombs exploded around a heavily packed cricket stadium, in which fifteen people were injured. A third bomb was defused outside the stadium. According to the Bangalore City Police, the blasts were caused by low-intensity crude bombs made of powergel, which is used in quarrying, and were triggered by timers. On 18 April, two more bombs were located near the stadium during search operations.

Yasin Bhatkal of the Indian Mujahideen is the prime accused in the case, among 14 others, 7 of whom have been apprehended. Another of the accused, Mohammad Qateel Siddiqui, also of the Indian Mujahideen, was killed by inmates at the Yerawada Central Jail for his alleged involvement in the attack.

In July 2018, a National Investigation Agency special court convicted and sentenced 3 of the 14 accused, Gowhar Aziz Khomani, Kamaal Hasan, and Mohammad Kafeel Akhtar (all from Bihar), to seven years in jail after they pleaded guilty. They had conspired and facilitated the terrorists who then prepared and planted the explosives.

== Background ==
Bengaluru is the information technology hub of India, with more than 40% of the country's IT and software industry based there. In July 2008, Bangalore had suffered serial blasts. India had also suffered from a series of blasts in Jaipur, in May 2008.

== The bombings ==
The stadium was filled with spectators watching a popular cricket tournament. An hour before the start of the match, two bombs exploded and a third bomb was found and defused outside the stadium. According to witnesses, there was a loud sound and people started running. After the bomb blast, police secured the area and the Twenty20 cricket match between the home team, Royal Challengers Bangalore, and Mumbai Indians, started an hour late, at 17:00 IST.

== Casualties ==
Initial reports indicated that ten people had been injured. The number of injured later increased to fifteen, including five security men.

== Investigations ==
Preliminary investigations soon after the event showed that a timer device had been used for the bombings. The police commissioner of Bangalore, Shankar Bidari, said that it was a "minor bomb blast" and that investigations were "in full swing" to find out who was responsible.

=== Abdul Naseer Madani ===
In August 2010, People's Democratic Party chairman Abdul Naseer Madani admitted involvement in the bombing. Karnataka home minister VS Acharya said that there was "an indirect involvement in a blast outside Chinnaswamy stadium," that a clearer picture would emerge in a couple of days, and that "more arrests are likely and inquiry may reveal more names." Madani was arrested on 17 August in Kollam in connection with the 2008 Bangalore serial blasts case.

== Impact ==
The Bangalore stadium blasts necessitated the shifting of two Indian Premier League matches from Bangalore to Mumbai.

== See also ==
- List of terrorist incidents, 2010
- Allegations of state terrorism committed by Pakistan
