= Karnataka Control of Organised Crimes Act, 2000 =

Law to combat organised crime and terrorism

Karnataka Legislative Assembly
- Enacted by: Karnataka Legislative Assembly
- Status: In force

The Karnataka Control of Organised Crimes Act, 2000 (KCOCA) is a law enacted by Karnataka state in India in 2000 to combat organised crime and terrorism. The Act was modeled on the Maharashtra Control of Organised Crime Act, 1999 (MCOCA).

The Act's stated purpose was to fight underworld and organized crime. An amendment bill was passed on 29 July 2009, making four main changes to the Act, adding ′terrorist act′ to purview of ‘organized crime′.
