= Rohini Salian =

Indian attorney (born 1947)

Rohini Salian (born 1947) is an Indian lawyer and former Chief Public Prosecutor for the State of Maharashtra in the Sessions Court, Mumbai. She was also a special public prosecutor for the Indian National Investigation Agency.

== Early life and education ==
Salian was born in Mangalore and initially studied art, before moving to Mumbai in 1982 and studying law.

== Career ==
=== Chief Public Prosecutor for Sessions Court, Mumbai ===
Salian was a public prosecutor for the State of Maharashtra, and served as the Chief Public Prosecutor for the State of Maharashtra in the Sessions Court, Mumbai, from 2001 to 2007. Salian is a leading Indian public prosecutor in the sessions court. Salian has handled several important cases such as the Borivali double murders case, the J J shootout case, the Sara Sahara shopping complex case and the Ghatkopar and Mulund blast cases.

=== Special Prosecutor - TADA, MCOCA, and POTA ===
In 1994, Salian was appointed as a special prosecutor for cases filed under the Terrorist and Disruptive Activities (Prevention) Act. Later, she was also appointed to prosecute cases under the Maharashtra Control of Organised Crime Act, and the Prevention of Terrorism Act, 2002.

==== Notable Cases under TADA, MCOCA and POTA ====
===== JJ Hospital Shootings =====
In 1992, Salian prosecuted Subhash Thakur, Brijesh Singh, Pappu Kalani, and others associated with mob leader Dawood Ibrahim for a shooting that took place in J.J. Hospital in Mumbai. Salian on behalf of the State of Maharashtra argued that the accused had entered the hospital and shot and killed Shailash Haldankar, who was associated with a rival gang led by Arun Gawli, as an act of revenge for the murder of a member of Ibrahim's family. They were also charged with the deaths of two police constables, who were killed while on duty at the hospital. They were charged under the provisions of the Terrorist and Disruptive Activities (Prevention) Act (TADA). A special court constituted under TADA convicted nine people for the shootings, and acquitted three. The case is still ongoing, with appeals being heard.

===== March 2003 Mumbai Bombing =====
Salian acted as a special prosecutor in the case concerning a bomb explosion on a train that was at Mulund Railway Station in Mumbai, which resulted in the deaths of twelve people. Fifteen people were charged in a special court for offences under the Prevention of Terrorism Act. Two of the accused died during the course of the trial, and the remaining thirteen were convicted in 2016.

==== Malegaon Blast Case and Criticism of Government ====
In 2015, Salian publicly criticised the National Investigation Agency, stating that officials within the organisation had attempted to prevent her from prosecuting the accused in the 2006 Malegaon bombings incident. Salian stated that the policy concerning the prosecution of the case had changed since the NDA government led by Prime Minister Narendra Modi had come to power in 2014, and that she had been asked to 'go soft' on the accused as they were linked to Hindu extremists. In response to her allegations, a criminal contempt case was filed against Salian by a resident of Mumbai, Sanjay Lakhe Patil. In an affidavit filed in the case concerning this contempt case, Salian named the NIA officers who had sought to interfere with her prosecution of the Malegaon bombings incident. Her allegations were denied by the NIA, which subsequently dropped charges against the accused in the case.

Salian was discharged as Special Public Prosecutor from the case, following her allegations. Following this, in September 2015, activist Harsh Mander filed a Public Interest Litigation petition at the Supreme Court of India, seeking their intervention to ensure a fair trial in the Malegaon case and accusing the NDA government of interfering with the prosecutor's ability to prosecute the case. The case was initially placed before a bench consisting of Justice U.U. Lalit and Justice F. M. I. Khalifulla; however, Justice Lalit recused himself on the grounds that he had previously appeared for some of the accused.

=== Private Practice ===
After retiring from public office, Salian returned to private practice and has been working as a defence lawyer in criminal matters, in Mumbai.
