= Gujarat Control of Terrorism and Organised Crime Act, 2015 =

Law of Gujarat, India

The Gujarat Control of Terrorism and Organised Crime Act, 2015 (GUJCOCA) is a controversial anti-terrorism law passed by the state legislature of Gujarat, India, in April 2003. On 5 November 2019, President Ram Nath Kovind gave his assent.

== Introduction and presidential assent ==
The bill was drawn on the lines of the Maharashtra Control of Organised Crime Act, 1999 (for Maharashtra) and Karnataka Control of Organised Crime Act (for Karnataka). It was then sent to the office of the President of India for assent. Originally, Dr. A.P.J. Abdul Kalam didn't give assent because of a few controversial points:

1. Clause 16 relates to the confession made before a police officer being admissible in court
2. Substitute the word "may" for "shall" after the words Special Court occurring in clause 20(2) and bring the provision in line with Section 43(d)(2) of the Unlawful Activities (Prevention) Act (Amendment), Clause 20(2) deals with the extension of the detention period
3. Amend Clause 20(4) to bring it in conformity with Section 43(d)(5) of the UAP (Amendment) Act. Clause 20(4) deals with the powers of the court to grant bail.

In July 2009, the bill was re-introduced in the state legislature without the changes suggested by the President, but it failed to pass. In 2019, The Gujarat Control of Terrorism and Organised Crime (GCTOC) bill passed by the Gujarat State Assembly received President Ram Nath Kovind's assent. The bill, which was formulated in 2003 when Prime Minister Narendra Modi was Chief Minister of the State, had been sent for presidential clearance three times. Each time it was rejected over a few controversial provisions.

The bill was successful in its fourth attempt when President Kovind gave his assent on 7 November 2019, almost 16 years after it was first introduced. It was considered controversial for two key reasons: intercepted telephone conversations would be considered legitimate evidence and a confession made before a police officer would also be considered documented evidence. President Ram Nath Kovind passed both. The law provides for the constitution of a special court along with the appointment of special public prosecutors to handle organised crime cases. Furthermore, assets acquired through organised crime could be auctioned and the transfer of assets could be cancelled.

The new law states that any act intended to disrupt or endanger law and order, public order, or the unity, integrity and security of the State, is illegal. Spreading terror in the minds of people also falls into the category of terrorism. The new law is formulated to deal with terrorism and organised crime such as contract killing, ponzi schemes, the narcotics trade, extortion rackets, cybercrime, land-grabbing and human trafficking.

According to state Ministry, the new law has a provision that allows up to life imprisonment for cases involving the crimes listed above. Additionally, if a death occurs in these crimes, capital punishment could apply.

== Human Rights Issue ==
The bill got an outright rejection from President A.P.J Abdul Kalam. In 2008, a second attempt was made at getting the presidential nod, but President Pratibha Patil sent it back over the confession provisions. In 2015, it went before President Pranab Mukherji but was sent back as he sought clarification on some clauses. While other States have similar laws, the provisions in the Gujarat law are widely acknowledged to be harsh, dangerous and part of a larger agenda.

=== See also ===
- Prevention of Terrorist Activities Act (POTA) of 2002
