= Students' Islamic Movement of India =

Banned Islamist organization

- Abbreviation: SIMI
- Formation: April 1977
- Type: Islamic organisation
- Location: India
- Key people: Mohammad Ahmadullah Siddiqi

The Students' Islamic Movement of India (abbreviated SIMI) is a banned extremist Indian Islamic student organisation that was formed in Aligarh, Uttar Pradesh in April 1977.

The Indian government describes it as a terrorist organisation, and banned it in 2001, shortly after the 9/11 attacks. The ban was lifted in August 2008 by a special tribunal, but was reinstated by K.G. Balakrishnan, then Chief Justice, on 6 August 2008 on national security grounds. In February 2019, the Government of India extended ban on SIMI for a period of five more years starting 1 February 2019 under Unlawful Activities (Prevention) Act.

== Background ==
On 25 April 1977, SIMI was founded in Aligarh, in the state of Uttar Pradesh, with Mohammad Ahmadullah Siddiqi as its founding president. Siddiqi, who currently serves as a professor of English and journalism at Western Illinois University in Macomb, IL, has since distanced himself from the organization, and in 2001 told SIMI activists that "the course SIMI was taking was absolutely inappropriate and wrong."

In 1981, SIMI activists protested against PLO leader Yasser Arafat's visit to India, and greeted him with black flags in New Delhi. Young SIMI activists viewed Arafat as a Western puppet, while the senior Jamaat-e-Islami Hind (JIH) leaders saw Arafat as a champion of the Palestinian cause. The JIH also became uncomfortable with SIMI's support of the 1979 Iranian Revolution and its communal orientation. After distancing itself from SIMI, JIH reverted to relying on the older student organization, SIO.

== Ideology ==
The Students Islamic Movement of India (SIMI), proscribed under the Unlawful Activities (Prevention) Act 1967, is an Islamist fundamentalist organization, which advocates the 'liberation of India' by converting it to an Islamic land. The SIMI, an organisation of young extremist students has declared Jihad against India, the aim of which is to establish Dar-ul-Islam (land of Islam) by either forcefully converting everyone to Islam or by violence. SIMI maintains that concepts of secularism, democracy and nationalism, keystones of Indian Constitution, are antithetical to Islam. Among its various objectives, SIMI aims to counter what it perceives as the increasing moral degeneration, sexual anarchy in Indian society and the 'in sensitiveness' of a 'decadent' West. They aim to restore the supremacy of Islam through the resurrection of the khilafat, emphasis on the Muslim ummah and the waging of jihad.

According to Sayeed Khan, a former president of SIMI, the group became more militant and extremist in the backdrop of communal riots and violence between Hindu and Muslim groups in the 1980s and 1990s.

== Ban and aftermath ==
The Government of India, by notification dated 8 February 2006 banned SIMI for the third time. SIMI was first banned on 26 September 2001 immediately following the September 11 attacks in the United States. SIMI remained banned from 27 September 2001 to 27 September 2003 during which period several prosecutions were launched against its members under the provisions of Terrorist and Disruptive Activities (Prevention) Act, the Maharashtra Control of Organised Crime Act (MCOCA), and the Unlawful Activities (Prevention) Act 1967.

SIMI was banned for the third time on 8 February 2006. The second ban of SIMI dated 27 September 2003 came to an end on 27 September 2005. Therefore, SIMI was in existence between 28 September 2005 and 7 February 2006 but was believed to be dysfunctional due to the fact that many of its members were demoralised or had crossed the age of 30 years; which automatically made them ineligible to continue as a member of SIMI – SIMI has an age limit of 30 years for membership. Many of its members had to fight cases registered against them by the Government.

However, on 27 July 2006, a spokesperson of the Indian Government told the Unlawful Activities (Prevention) Tribunal held in New Delhi, that contrary to notions that SIMI's activities declined following its ban, the organisation "had stepped up its subversive activities and was involved in almost all major explosions, communal violence and circulation of inflammatory material across the country."

The ban notification and the background note stated that SIMI deserved to be banned for clandestine activities and links with around 20 organisations through whom SIMI was allegedly operating. The background note clearly says that there was no violent incident in which SIMI was involved in the last 2–3 years.

To prove its case against SIMI, the Government cited several cases under the Unlawful Activities (Prevention) Act registered between 1998 and 2001.

On 15th February 2007, the Supreme Court describes the banned Students Islamic Movement of India as a "secessionist movement." The third ban on SIMI was shortly lifted by the Delhi High Court Tribunal on 5 August 2008. But the lifting of the ban was stayed by the supreme court of India on the next day (6 August 2008).

A special tribunal has upheld the ban imposed on SIMI by the Home Ministry under the Unlawful Activities (Prevention) Act, 1967. The Tribunal's head confirming the ban held that SIMI has links with Pakistan-based terror outfits and its front, the Indian Mujahideen.

In 2014, The Union government has renewed the ban on Students Islamic Movement of India (SIMI) under the Unlawful Activities (Prevention) Act for another five years.

On 18 May 2014, at Bhopal district court, alleged members who were being produced before the court shouted pro-Taliban slogans saying "Taliban zindabad" (long live Taliban) and indicated a threat to designated Prime Minister Narendra Modi with "Ab Modi ki baari hai"(It is Modi's turn now) at Bhopal district court.

On 7 April 2015, Five suspected SIMI activists were shot dead in Nalagonda, Telangana by the same security team who were escorting them in a police van from Warangal jail to a Hyderabad court 150 km away. The police stated that they were trying to escape by snatching weapons. Later the relatives of the dead and some civil activists raised question on the authenticity of the incident. An inquiry by an executive magistrate and judicial inquiry has been ordered into the encounter incident, following a Supreme Court of India directive in 2014.

On 1 May 2015, A trial court in Hubli, Karnataka acquitted 17 men who were arrested by Karnataka Police in 2008 on charges of terrorism and criminal conspiracy and allegedly being associated with the SIMI.

In 2018, NIA court convicted 18 SIMI activists under Section 120B, Sections 10, 38 besides Section 4 of the Explosive Substances Act. Thirteen accused were also deemed guilty under Section 20 (being members of a terrorist organisation/ gang). They were given up to seven years' rigorous imprisonment.

== Front outfits ==
SIMI operate under various fronts to avoid law enforcement agencies after it was banned in 2001. The Indian government's Union Ministry of Home Affairs mentioned some organization it deemed to be fronts of SIMI,

- Tahreek-e-Ahyaa-e-Ummat (TEU),
- Khair-e-Ummat Trust
- Tehreek-Talaba-e-Arabia (TTA),
- Tahrik Tahaffuz-e-Sha´air-e-Islam (TTSI)
- Wahdat-e-Islami

=== Kerala ===
Location of terrorist training camps in Kerala

SIMI conducted training camps in the southern Indian state of Kerala.

==== Binanipuram camp ====
A camp was organised in 2006 at Binanipuram near Aluva in Ernakulam district of Kerala state. 40-50 SIMI members were trained in commando and jungle warfare skills.

On 15 August 2006, Kerala Police questioned 18 people and arrested five – Ansar Moulavi, Shaduli, Nizamuddin, Abdul Rafeeq and Shamas – under the Unlawful Activities (Prevention) Act. The five arrested were later released on bail.

Ansar Moulavi and Shaduli are also accused of attending another training camp at Vagamon conducted between December 2007 – January 2008. Both were arrested after the 13 May 2008 Jaipur bombings by the Rajasthan police.

==== Vagamon camp ====
A camp was conducted at Thangalpara, Vagamon in Idukki district of Kerala in December 2007-January 2008. Camp attendees are said to be trained in commando, jungle warfare, trekking, rock climbing, rappeling and herbal medicine. Speeches inciting the participants to wage jihad (war) against India are said to be made.

About 20 students from Hubli, Belgaum and Bangalore were trained to assemble explosives with easily available materials by a bomb expert Abdul Subhan Qureshi. Ammonium nitrate, a commonly available nitrogenous fertiliser, was used in the 2008 Ahmedabad bombings. Prototypes of liquid bombs using commonly available hydrogen peroxide were first experimented at the Vagamon camp.

Abdul Sathar alias Manzoor, from Aluva in Kerala, is accused of attending the camp and of being involved in the 2008 Ahmedabad bombings and 2008 Bangalore serial blasts. He is also accused of recruitment of youths from Kerala and sending them to Pakistan for terror training by the Lashkar-e-Taiba. Declared a proclaimed offender, an Interpol red alert notice was issued against him. A fugitive for six years, he was deported from Dubai on 2 August 2013 and arrested on arrival in India.

==== Kannur camp ====
On 23 April 2013, a terror training camp inside a building owned by Thanal Foundation Trust in Mayyil Narath area of Kannur district was organised by members of Popular Front of India (PFI), a SIMI front. The camp was raided by police and 21 people were arrested. Country bombs, a sword, a human effigy, cellphones and accessories for making bombs were recovered during the police raid.

According to the charge sheet filed by the investigators, activists belonging to Popular Front of India and its political wing Social Democratic Party of India had organised this training camp. The charge sheet said that one of the participants had links with Indian Mujahideen terrorist group. The investigators provided evidence of transfer of funds between bank accounts to prove its allegations. The bank accounts details of Sanaulla Shabandri were found during the raid on the house of one of the accused. Shabandri from Bhatkal, is believed to be a close associate of Yasin Bhatkal and an Indian Mujahideen member.

On 21 January 2016, a court sentenced 21 of those accused to varying years of imprisonments after they were found guilty under several charges including criminal conspiracy, membership of unlawful assembly, possession of arms and explosive substances, inciting communal disharmony, assertions prejudicial to national integration besides organising a terrorist camp.

The court found that the enterprise was unlawful and that the accused persons could not explain why they were in possession of weapons and country-bombs.

=== Karnataka ===
==== Castle Rock camp ====
In April 2007, SIMI held a terrorist training camp at Castle Rock near Hubli, under the cover of hosting an outdoors event.

=== Gujarat ===
==== Pavagadh camp ====
In January 2008, a training camp at an isolated place near the Khundpir (also spelt Khundmeer) dargah near Pavagadh in Gujarat state was reportedly used to train SIMI activists for the 2008 bomb attacks on the cities of Ahmedabad and Surat.

=== Indian Mujahideen ===
The exact nature of the relationship between SIMI and Indian Mujahideen (IM) is debated. Some analysts contend that IM is a militant branch of SIMI while others believe that the two groups are distinct although linked.

== See also ==
- List of organisations banned by the Government of India
- Darsgah-Jihad-O-Shahadat
- Deendar Anjuman
