= Maharashtra Control of Organised Crime Act, 1999 =

Law enacted by Government of Maharashtra to combat Organised crime and Terrorism

Maharashtra Legislative Assembly
- Enacted by: Maharashtra Legislative Assembly
- Introduced by: Gopinath Munde
- Status: In force

The Maharashtra Control of Organised Crime Act, 1999 (Mah. 30/1999) is a law enacted by the state of Maharashtra in India in 1999 to combat organised crime and terrorism. Known as "MCOCA", the Act provides the State Government with special powers to tackle these issues, including powers of surveillance,relaxed evidentiary standards and procedural safeguards, and prescribing additional criminal penalties, including the death penalty. The law was introduced by a coalition government of the Bharatiya Janata Party and Shiv Sena. Gopinath Munde (dy.CM of Maharashtra at the time) had the lion's share in the efforts which were taken for this act's enactment; to curb the rising powers of the underworld in the state.

== Legislative history and aim ==
MCOCA was enacted as an ordinance on 24 February 1999, and was subsequently ratified by the legislature, becoming law when it received the assent of the President of India in accordance with the procedure under Article 245 of the Constitution of India, which applies when a legislative subject is within both state and federal powers. MCOCA was the first state legislation enacted to address organised crime in India. It replaced the temporary Maharashtra Control of Organised Crime Ordinance 1999.

The Statement of Object and Reasons that prefaces MCOCA identifies organised crime as a threat, linking it to terrorist activity and noting the economic impact of illegal wealth and black money on the state's economy. The Statement of Objects and Reasons goes on to note, "the existing legal framework, i.e. the penal and procedural laws and the adjudicatory system, are found to be rather inadequate to curb or control the menace of organised crime. Government has, therefore, decided to enact a special law with stringent and deterrent provisions including in certain circumstances power to intercept wire, electronic or oral communication to control the menace of organised crime."

== Applicability ==
MCOCA applies to the entire State of Maharashtra. The Home Ministry of the Government of India extended the applicability of MCOCA to the National Capital Territory of Delhi as well, by a notification dated 2 January 2002. MCOCA overrides all other Indian laws, and will prevail over any Indian law that conflicts with the provisions that MCOCA contains.

== Major provisions ==
=== Definitions ===
MCOCA defines 'organised crime' as "any continuing unlawful activity by an individual, singly or jointly, either as a member of an organised crime syndicate or on behalf of such syndicate, by use of violence or threat of violence or intimidation or coercion, or other unlawful means, with the objective of gaining pecuniary benefits, or gaining undue economic or other advantage for himself or any person or promoting insurgency," and further defines an 'organised crime syndicate' as consisting of two or more persons who singly or collectively engage in organised crime.

=== Penalties ===
MCOCA provides for a number of penalties in relation to organised crime, described in the table below.

MCOCA Section	Offence	Penalty
Section 3(1)(i)	Committing organised crime resulting in the death of any person	Death, or life imprisonment, and a minimum fine of Rs. 150,000
Section 3(1)(ii)	Committing any other organised crime	Imprisonment for a term between five years to life, and a minimum fine of Rs. 500,000
Section 3(2)	Conspiring to, abetting, aiding in, or knowingly facilitating organised crime	Imprisonment for a term between five years to life, and a minimum fine of Rs. 500,000
Section 3(3)	Harbouring or concealing a member of an organised crime syndicate	Imprisonment for a term between five years to life, and a minimum fine of Rs. 500,000
Section 3(4)	Membership in an organised crime syndicate	Imprisonment for a term between five years to life, and a minimum fine of Rs. 500,000
Section 3(4)	Holding any property derived from the commission of organised crime, or from the funds of an organised crime syndicate	Imprisonment for a term between three years to life, and a minimum fine of Rs. 200,000
Section 4	Possessing movable or immovable property on behalf of an organised crime syndicate	Imprisonment for a term between three and ten years, a fine of Rs. 100,000 and forfeiture of the property in question
Section 24	Public servants helping to carry out organised crime, or failing to take lawful measures under MCOCA, or disobeying orders of Special Courts under MCOCA	Imprisonment for up to three years and a fine of

=== Establishment of special courts and prosecutors ===
Sections 5 to 8 of MCOCA provide for the establishment of special courts to try offences defined under the Act. Such courts can be established by the Maharashtra State Government by notification in the Official Gazette of the state, and are staffed by judges nominated by the State, in concurrence with the Chief Justice of the Bombay High Court. To qualify as a judge for a MCOCA Special Court, the judge must previously have served as a judge in a criminal trial court, known as a Sessions Court. MCOCA Special Courts have the jurisdiction to try cases concerning offences defined under MCOCA, but can also conduct trials for offences under any other laws, provided that the offences are connected to a MCOCA trial or discovered in the course of a MCOCA trial.

MCOCA further provides that each Special Court shall have a Special Public Prosecutor appointed to conduct trials, and that such prosecutors have the same powers as prosecutors appointed to conduct criminal trials under the Indian Code of Criminal Procedure, 1973. The minimum qualification for such prosecutors is at least ten years of practice as an advocate in India.

Trials in MCOCA courts take precedence over any other trial that persons accused of offences under this Act may be facing, and Special Courts can transfer cases out of their jurisdiction to trial courts if they find that the case is unrelated to MCOCA. Appeals from orders of MCOCA Special Courts are preferred directly to the state's High Court and must be filed within 30 days of the order being appealed.

=== Investigative and surveillance powers ===
MCOCA provides special powers to the police to conduct surveillance, in the form of intercepting written, oral, and electronic evidence. All investigations must be directed by a police officer who holds the minimum rank of Deputy Superintendent of Police, and all information about the commission of offences have to be recorded by police officers holding a minimum rank of Deputy Inspector General of Police.

==== Authorisation of surveillance ====
MCOCA provides for the appointment of a 'Competent Authority' to supervise and authorise the police to conduct surveillance activities to investigate organised crime. The Competent Authority is to be appointed by the State Government, and must be an officer not below the rank of Secretary to the Government.

Applications for the interception of wire, electronic, or oral communication have to be made by a police officer of the rank of Superintendent of Police, involved in the investigation, and have to contain information including the identities of the investigating officers, a statement of facts detailing the offence committed or about to be committed, the identity of the person sought to be surveilled, the location of the surveillance, as well as the proposed method and duration of the surveillance. The application also has to contain a disclosure of any prior requests for surveillance involving the same persons or places that are sought to be surveilled.

MCOCA then permits the Competent Authority to grant all or part of such application, if the Competent Authority is satisfied, that the following conditions are met:

- There is probable cause that the target of surveillance has committed or is about to commit an offence under MCOCA;
- There is probable cause that particular communications concerning that offence will be obtained through the proposed surveillance and interceptions;
- Other modes of inquiry and intelligence gathering have been tried and have failed, or appear to be reasonably unlikely to succeed, or appear to be too dangerous, or are likely to expose the identities of those connected with the surveillance operation; and
- There is probable cause to believe that the facilities in which the surveillance is proposed are being used, or are likely to be used, in connection with committing an offence under MCOCA, and are leased, listed to, or commonly used by the target of surveillance.

MCOCA requires the Competent Authority to record the reasons for his or her order in writing, and to specify the target, duration, and extent of surveillance in the authorising order. Orders cannot allow the interception of any communication for a period exceeding 60 days, and applications for an extension of a surveillance order have to undergo the same process of vetting as the original application. The Competent Authority can also require periodic reports on the surveillance operation from the investigators.

==== Oversight of surveillance ====
Individual surveillance orders passed under MCOCA are not under the review of the legislature or the judiciary, and oversight is retained within the State Government. All orders passed by Competent Authorities to conduct surveillance and intercept communications have to be reviewed by a Review Committee. MCOCA provides that the Review Committee should be chaired by the Chief Secretary to the State Government, and also include the Principal Secretary or Secretary and Remembrancer of Legal Affairs and the Law and Judiciary Department as well as the additional Chief Secretary or the senior most Principal Secretary as the case may be, in the Home Department. MCOCA does not require the Competent Authority to place its orders for review within a specified period of time; however, once placed before the Review Committee, the committee has to make a determination within ten days, on whether the order was 'necessary, reasonable and justified'. The State Government is required to place an annual report of surveillance orders before the State Legislature, but is permitted to exclude any information that it feels might prejudice State security, or an investigation or prevention of organised crime.

==== Exceptions to the authorisation procedure ====
In cases of exception, or emergencies, a police officer who is not below the rank of Additional Director General of Police can order surveillance or interception of communication without taking prior consent of the Competent Authority. Such exceptions or emergencies must involve either the danger of death or physical injury to any person, or a conspiracy threatening the security of the State.

==== Prohibited interceptions and penalties ====
MCOCA prohibits the interception of any communication unless authorised by the procedure under MCOCA, and also prohibits any disclosure of information obtained by such interceptions unless authorised to do so under MCOCA. Persons who violate these prohibitions, whether they are disclosing, obtaining, or receiving unauthorised interceptions can be penalised with imprisonment for up to one year, and a maximum fine of Rs. 50,000.

=== Evidence ===
==== Admissibility of intercepted communication ====
All communications intercepted and obtained under MCOCA must be recorded, wherever possible and the recordings have to be made available to the Competent Authority that authorised the surveillance. The Competent Authority retains custody of the recordings and must preserve them for at least ten years, and can make the recordings available to any person if they determine that it is in the interests of justice. The Competent Authority is also required to keep an archive of surveillance applications and orders for a period of ten years.

MCOCA provides that no evidence, including recordings, obtained under these MCOCA provisions are admissible in evidence unless they have been provided to all parties concerned in the trial at least ten days in advance, along with copies of the surveillance application and authorising order; however, MCOCA also authorises judges to waive the ten-day period for evidence review if they feel that the investigators and prosecutors cannot comply with it, and that the delay will not prejudice the trial. In the event that a Review Committee finds that an order by a Competent Authority for surveillance was not reasonable, necessary or justified, all intercepted communication under that order has to be destroyed and is inadmissible in court.

==== Presumption of guilt ====
Under MCOCA, if a person is found in possession of arms and weapons believed to be used in committing an offence, or if their fingerprints are found at a scene of a crime, MCOCA Special Courts are permitted to assume that they are guilty of committing that crime. MCOCA Special Courts can also presume guilt for an offence if a person is found providing financial aid to any one else who committed an offence under MCOCA. MCOCA accordingly reversed the principle of law that a person is presumed innocent until proved guilty, by transferring the burden of proof of innocence to the person accused of crimes.

==== Prohibition of suits against the state ====
MCOCA prohibits any lawsuit against the State Government or any officers or state authorities, for actions done in good faith, or actions done in pursuance of MCOCA.

==== Exceptions to rules of evidence ====
MCOCA further establishes certain exceptions to the Indian Evidence Act, and the Code of Criminal Procedure. Unlike in other criminal trials, MCOCA Special Courts are allowed to take into account some prior conduct of persons accused of offences under MCOCA, including previous prosecutions under MCOCA or other laws permitting preventive detention, as well as prior orders of caution for habitual offenders. Additionally, when a person is accused of offences under MCOCA, the Court may operate under a presumption that any unaccounted-for property found with the accused person was obtained illegally, unless the person is able to prove otherwise. Similarly, if a case of kidnapping or abduction is proven in connection with a MCOCA trial, a Special Court can presume that it was for ransom.

=== Criminal procedure ===
==== Powers and procedure in special courts ====
Special Courts are exempted from a number of requirements under the Indian Code of Criminal Procedure, 1973 under MCOCA, and the Bombay High Court as well as the State Government have the power to frame additional rules of procedure for Special Courts.

MCOCA Special Courts can take cognisance and begin the trial process when a complaint is filed before the court, even if the persons named in the complaint are not present at the time. Special Courts can conduct summary trials for offences under MCOCA. Ordinarily, summary trials are conducted with a simplified procedure used only when the maximum penalty is three months of imprisonment; in the case of MCOCA, these can be used for penalties extending to three years. Special Courts also do not have to follow the normal procedure to issue a pardon, and can provide a pardon if a person co-operates with the court in providing evidence. MCOCA Special Courts also have the power to attach the property of any person being tried, and if the trial results in conviction, that property is then forfeited to the state.

==== Confessions ====
Under Indian criminal procedure, confessions made to police officers are ordinarily inadmissible, and Section 25 of the Indian Evidence Act prohibits such confessions in order to eliminate the possibility of eliciting confessions by force or intimidation during interrogation. MCOCA makes an exception to this rule, allowing certain confessions made to police officers to be admissible in evidence. The conditions for this exception to apply are that the police officer must be of the rank of Superintendent or higher; the confession must be recorded; the person making the confession must be cautioned that they are not bound to make the confession, and that it can be used against them in evidence. MCOCA further requires that the person making the confession statement should be produced before a judicial magistrate, who is to scrutinise the statement, and may hear any complaints about torture, following which the magistrate can order a medical examination if necessary. MCOCA does not specify a minimum period of time for the person to be produced before a magistrate, apart from specifying that it should be done "without unreasonable delay". MCOCA also makes confessions admissible not only against the person making them, but also against any co-conspirators, abettors, or others named by the person confession.

==== Detention and bail ====
The Indian Code of Criminal Procedure 1973 allows magistrates to extend detention of a person in police custody beyond 24 hours if it is necessary for an investigation. In the case of MCOCA trials, this period can be extended from the standard maximum of 30 days to a maximum of 180 days, without trial. Anticipatory bail, i.e. an application for an order of bail when a person believes they may be arrested in the future, do not apply in MCOCA cases, and the conditions for ordinary bail are far more stringent, and can be granted to a person only when the Court "is satisfied that there are reasonable grounds for believing he is not guilty of such offence." MCOCA allows for preventive detention and custodial interrogation, with the only safeguard being a requirement that the police officer seeking such detention or custody has to file a written statement detailing the reasons. The implication of these bail provisions is that a person accused of a crime under MCOCA may be indefinitely detained during investigation, unless charges are framed or the person is found innocent in the investigation.

==== Witness protection ====
India does not have a law for the protection of witnesses, although since 2018, a temporary Witness Protection Program is in place following a Supreme Court ruling requiring one until Parliament legislates on the subject. Under MCOCA, however, a Special Court can take certain measures to protect the identity of witnesses, including holding court proceedings in special locations, removing mentions of witness names in their orders, keeping witness protection orders sealed, and refraining from publishing the orders of any court proceeding. The violation of any witness protection orders can result in imprisonment for up to one year and a maximum fine of Rs. 1,000.

== Notable cases prosecuted under MCOCA ==
- MCOCA charges were also brought against those accused in the 2006 Mumbai Train Bombings, and in 2006, five persons were sentenced to life imprisonment, and seven others to the death penalty, in connection with this case.
- In 2008, Arun Gawli, a former gangster, businessman and politician, was charged along with other members of the Akhil Bharatiya Sena, in a case concerning extortion.
- In 2013, MCOCA was invoked against cricketers S. Sreesanth, Ajit Chandila, and Ankeet Chavan, amongst others, by the Delhi Police, in connection with the 2013 IPL spot-fixing and betting case. In 2015, charges under MCOCA were dropped against these three and 38 other persons charged with MCOCA offences, on grounds of insufficient evidence.
- A number of alleged associates of mobster Ravi Pujari have been prosecuted under MCOCA. In 2019, Obed Radiowala, alleged to be an associate of Gawli, was deported from the United States of America to India and produced before a MCOCA Special Court, which later dropped the charges against him in a case concerning an attack on film producer Mahesh Bhatt. He was then prosecuted in the criminal courts in Mumbai.
- MCOCA was invoked against the accused in the 29 September 2008 western India bombings, including Pragya Singh Thakur (a Member of Parliament for the Bharatiya Janata Party), Lt. Col. Prasad Purohit, and others. However, in 2017 the charges concerning MCOCA were dropped by a Special Court. Special Prosecutor Rohini Salian in the case alleged that the National Investigation Agency (NIA) had asked her to "go soft" on the accused in this case, following which she was "denotified" from NIA's panel of lawyers, the NIA said that Salian's allegations were false, “unwarranted and baseless”.
- In 2016, MCOCA provisions were used to charge gangster and drug trafficker Chhota Rajan in connection with the murder of journalist Jyotirmay Dey.

== Judicial review and interpretation of MCOCA ==
=== Judicial review ===
In 2007, one of the accused in a case relating to the 2006 Mumbai train bombings challenged the definition of 'organised crime' in MCOCA, which includes the term, 'insurgency', basing their claim on the Constitution of India's allocation of legislative powers between the State and Center. The argument made in this case, Zameer Ahmed Latifur Rehman Sheikh v. State of Maharashtra against MCOCA was that the Constitution of India did not allow state legislatures to frame laws on issues concerning 'insurgency' and that this would fall within the powers of the Parliament of India to legislate on issues of national defense, instead. Justice Ranjana Desai held for the Supreme Court that MCOCA's goal was to counter organised crime, which fell within the state's powers to legislate on criminal law, and that the mention of 'insurgency' did not infringe on Parliament's powers to legislate on issues relating to the defense of India.

The constitutionality of MCOCA was also challenged in 2008, in State of Maharashtra v Bharat Shanti Lal Shah. In this case, MCOCA was challenged once again, on two grounds. The petitioners argued first that the State Legislature did not have the power to legislate on intercepting communications and surveillance, as that power belonged to the Parliament of India, which had already enacted the Indian Telegraph Act 1885, dealing with the same issues, and secondly, that provisions of MCOCA violated the Constitution of India's guarantee of the right to equality in Article 14. The Supreme Court of India rejected both these arguments.

=== Interpretation ===
In 2011, the Bombay High Court accepted an argument from the Maharashtra State Government, that the term 'organised crime' in MCOCA should be interpreted widely, to allow the state to prosecute those who gained advantages other than pecuniary benefits.

== Criticism ==
=== Implementation and review ===
The provisions of MCOCA have been criticised by legal scholars, police officers, prosecutors, politicians, and commentators, with the law being described as "draconian" In 2018, BS Joon, former director of prosecution in the Delhi government, criticised the use of MCOCA, noting that "Police often invoke MCOCA haphazardly. Many times the investigators do not comply with the exact ingredients of MCOCA which means the evidence is weak and the accused is let off. Many times police use MCOCA so that the accused persons don't get bail and remain behind the bars". Mumbai Police have consistently endorsed the use of MCOCA provisions despite these criticisms, with Mumbai Police Commissioner D Sivanandan stating to journalists in 2010, "Should we do away with electricity because some people get electrocuted?"

In 2004, noting such criticism, Maharashtra Home Minister R.R. Patil constituted a review committee to examine the provisions and implementation of MCOCA, consisting of former Judge Chandrasekhar Dharmadhikari, former Mumbai Police Commissioner, Satish Sawhney, and Nagpur Police Commissioner D. Shivanandan. The review committee submitted a report in 2007, noting that MCOCA provisions had been misused, and recommended the creation of a review panel headed by a retired judge. This recommendation was not accepted, and in 2010, a bench of the Bombay High Court, consisting of Justice Ranjana Desai and Justice Mridula Bhatkar also recommended the formation of a review panel to prevent the misuse of MCOCA provisions, pointing to the creation of similar review panels for the implementation of similar laws, such as the since-repealed Terrorism and Disruptive Activities (Prevention) Act, and Prevention of Terrorism Act.

=== Application in offences other than organised crime ===
The definition of 'organised crime' in MCOCA has been criticised as being too vague, and allowing the Act's stringent provisions to be applied in a wide variety of cases, including those that are already covered under other laws.

Although MCOCA was initially intended to prosecute organised crime that was not covered in other laws, over the years, the Act has been used in Maharashtra for a number of offences already defined in the Indian Penal Code. In 2020, MCOCA was invoked against a person charged with kidnapping a doctor for ransom in Pune. In some instances, courts have pushed back against the use of MCOCA in this manner; in 2016, the Bombay High Court refused to allow charges under MCOCA in a case concerning assault by two groups against each other, noting that this was not the intended use of MCOCA's provisions.

Conflict has also arisen over the use of MCOCA provisions to bring charges in the case of terrorist attacks, with the Bombay High Court in 2019 ruling that in such cases, charges against MCOCA as well as under the Unlawful Activities Prevention Act (UAPA) can be brought. This ruling overturns a finding of a MCOCA Special Court, which had previously stated that UAPA and MCOCA have different aims, and that charges under both for the same offence cannot be brought simultaneously.

=== Bail, custody and torture ===
In 2010, an investigation by journalists Ajit Sahi and Rana Ayyub showed that in seven out of eight cases that they studied, persons were detained under MCOCA for sustained periods without any charges against them, and eventually freed for lack of any evidence that they had committed crimes. Persons detained under MCOCA have made repeated allegations of torture and violence during custody, and custodial interrogation. In 2017, an internal investigation found that prison staff was responsible for assaults against a person in custody for charges under MCOCA in Nashik Jail, and referred the matter to the Maharashtra State Human Rights Commission for further investigation.

=== Impact and conviction rates ===
The efficacy of MCOCA in tackling organised crime has been critiqued on the basis of conviction rates, suggesting that the provisions of the Act are not effective in aiding the prevention and investigation of organised crime. Defense lawyers have suggested that the conviction rate is very low, and close to 10%. The Mumbai Police on the other hand have made various and occasionally conflicting claims about the conviction rate under MCOCA. In 2009, prosecution data suggested that the conviction rate for offences under MCOCA was 58% of cases, a figure that Ujwala Shankarrao Pawar, an additional prosecutor in Maharashtra, described as "very less". However, the Mumbai Police described the conviction rate as "a huge 62 per cent," leading to some ambiguity about the actual rates, and compared to the 25% rate of convictions for offences under the Indian Penal Code. In 2010, Pune Police Commissioner Meera Borwankar began an initiative to improve conviction rates for offences, specifically noting the high number of acquittals in MCOCA cases. MCOCA also was extended to apply in the National Capital Territory of Delhi in 2002, but in 2016, Delhi Police admitted that although the Act had been invoked in 57 cases, convictions had only been secured in 1 case. In 2015, noting low conviction rates, the Maharashtra Government established a dedicated legal team to assist the Maharashtra Anti-Terrorism Squad (ATS) for cases including those involving MCOCA offences.

=== Penalties for public officials ===
MCOCA has also been criticised because it enables action to be taken against police officers for offences such as failing to adequately implement the Act. For instance, in 2010, Chhagan Bhujbal, who was the Home Minister for Maharashtra when MCOCA was enacted, called for amendments in the law, criticizing its implementation. While endorsing the need for MCOCA to tackle organised crime, Bhujbal suggested that the provisions prohibiting or reducing access to bail should be amended, to allow accused persons out of jail while awaiting trial. He also noted that the provisions of MCOCA were being used to settle scores within the police force, resulting in the imprisonment of police officers for alleged failures to implement the law.

== Related legislation ==
Following the enactment of MCOCA in Maharashtra, a number of Indian states have enacted similar or identical legislation. These include the Karnataka Control of Organised Crime Act (KCOCA) and a similar law in Andhra Pradesh, which was of a limited duration and expired in 2004. Other states have also attempted to enact parallel legislation, including Gujarat, Rajasthan, and Madhya Pradesh; however, these bills failed to gain presidential assent and consequently were not enacted. In 2019, the Haryana State Legislature cleared a MCOCA-like bill to tackle organised crime. In 2019, the Gujarat State Legislature received presidential assent for the controversial Gujarat Control of Organised Crime Act, which had failed to receive presidential assent on three prior occasions.

MCOCA has also served as a model for national legislation, with its example being specifically invoked during discussions in Parliament on the Prevention of Terrorism Act (which has since been repealed).

== External reference ==
- Full text of the Maharashtra Control of Organised Crime Act
