= Cherlapally Central Jail =

Jail in Hyderabad, Telangana, India

- Interactive map of Cherlapally Central Jail
- Location: Cherlapally, Kapra Mandal, Hyderabad, Telangana, India; 17.467799°N 78.587436°E
- Opened: 2000
- Managed by: Director General & Inspector General of Prisons and Correctional Services, Government of Telangana

Notable prisoners
- as of 01-04-2022 the population is 2150

Cherlapally Central Jail is a correctional facility in Cherlapally, Hyderabad, Telangana, India. The facility is located 28 kilometres (17 mi) away from Hyderabad city centre. It is operated by the Telangana Prisons and Correctional Services.

== History ==
The Cherlapally Central Jail was established by relocating the Secunderabad district prison to a purpose-built facility on a prisoner agricultural colony in 1999 and 2000. Construction was completed within 18 months, and the prison was commissioned on 5 May 2000. The facility spans 43.4 acres within its perimeter walls and a total of 117.13 acres, making it the largest correctional facility in Telangana. Maximum inmate capacity of the prison is 2,000.

== Infrastructure ==
Cherlapally Central Jail is located in an area spread across 120 acres (49 ha). It employs prisoners in agricultural, dairy activities etc. The jail also houses a 15-20 acre vegetable farm, dairy farm and a 20 acres mango orchard. The produce from these facilities not just serves the requirements of the prison, but also is used for other prisons in the city. In May 2025, a beekeeping initiative was launched, training batches of inmates in hive management, honey extraction, wax processing, and marketing.

There are also manufacturing units that produce steel furniture, textiles, soap, phenyl, and herbal products in the prison. Prisoners participating in these courses will receive certification from National Academy of Construction. Academic courses for the inmates are available via Dr. B.R. Ambedkar Open University.
