= 2008 Ahmedabad bombings =

Terrorist attacks by Mujahideen in Gujarat, India

- Location: Ahmedabad, Gujarat, India
- Date: 26 July 2008; 18 years ago 18:45 – 19:55 (IST)
- Attack type: Bombing
- Deaths: 56
- Injuries: 200
- Perpetrators: Indian Mujahideen; Harkat-ul-Jihad-al-Islami
- Accused: 77 (28 acquitted)
- Verdict: All 49 convicts found guilty on 18 February 2022: Death penalty to 38 convicts; Life imprisonment to 11 convicts
- Convictions: Murder; Attempted murder; Property damage
- Convicted: 49 (See list below)

The 2008 Ahmedabad bombings were a series of 21 bomb blasts that hit Ahmedabad, India, on 26 July 2008, within a span of 70 minutes. Fifty-six people were killed and over 200 people were injured. Ahmedabad is the cultural and commercial heart of Gujarat state and a large part of western India. The blasts were considered to be of low intensity and were similar to the Bangalore blasts, Karnataka which occurred the day before. This bombings were done by Pakistani Islamic Terrorist group Harkat-ul-Jihad al-Islami.

Several TV channels had received an e-mail from a terror outfit called Indian Mujahideen claiming responsibility for the terror attacks; Islamic militant group Harkat-ul-Jihad-al-Islami, however, has claimed responsibility for the attacks. The Gujarat police arrested the suspected mastermind, Mufti Abu Bashir, along with nine others, in connection to the bombings.

In a verdict given by Ahmedabad special court in February 2022, of the 77 accused, 28 were acquitted for lack of evidence, 11 were sentenced to life imprisonment and 38 were sentenced to death.

== Bombings ==
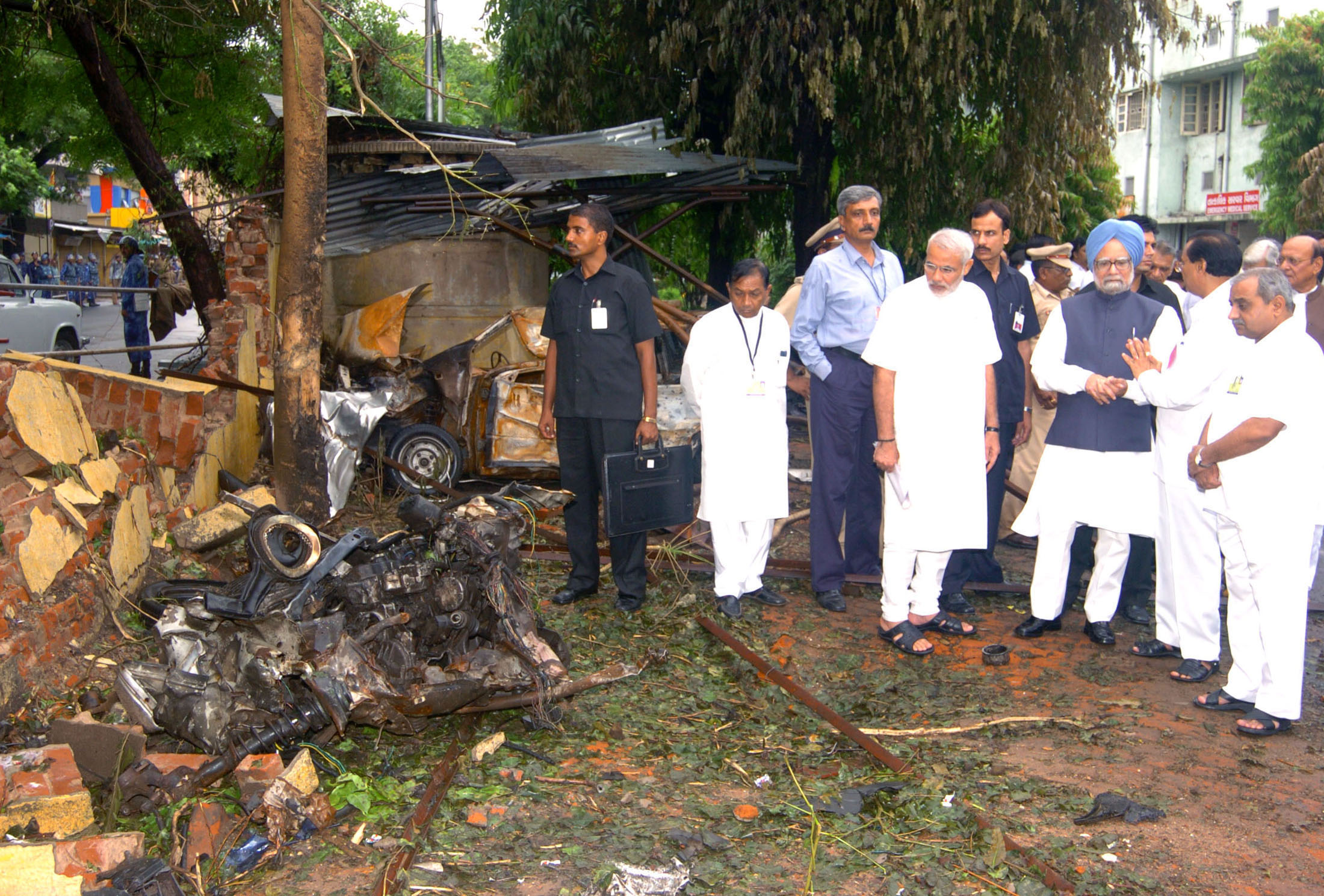
Prime minister Manmohan Singh visits bomb blast site, with him is Gujarat chief minister Narendra Modi.

The bombs were planted in Tiffin carriers on bicycles, a pattern similar to the 13 May 2008 Jaipur bombings. Many of the blasts targeted the city bus service of AMTS (Ahmedabad Municipal Transport Service), ripping apart portions of the vehicles. Two blasts took place inside the premises of two hospitals, about 40 minutes after the initial series of blasts. One of the blasts in the hospitals occurred when injured victims of the initial series of blasts were being admitted there. Another bomb was found and defused on the following day in the Hatkeshwar area. Two live bombs were also retrieved from Maninagar, Gujarat Chief Minister Narendra Modi's constituency.

Gujarat police recovered and defused two more bombs in Surat, another major city in Gujarat, a day after the Ahmedabad blasts. Two cars filled with materials required to make explosives, including detonators, were also found, one of them parked on a roadside near a hospital, and the other in the outskirts of Surat.

=== Bombing Locations ===
- Ahmedabad Civil Hospital, trauma center
- Khadia
- Raipur
- Sarangpur
- L.G. Hospital, Maninagar
- Maninagar
- Hatkeshwar Circle
- Bapunagar
- Thakkarbapa Nagar
- Jawahar Chowk
- Govindwadi
- Isanpur
- Narol
- Sarkhej

=== Warning of attacks through e-mail ===
Several news agencies reported receiving a 14-page e-mail five minutes before the explosions with the subject line: "Await 5 minutes for the revenge of Gujarat", apparently referring to the 2002 Gujarat violence which took place after the Godhra train burning incident. The e-mail was sent by the Islamic extremist group known as Indian Mujahideen on 26 July at around 6:41pm IST.

The contents of the e-mail warned of attacks in 5 minutes: "In the name of Allah the Indian Mujahideen strike again! Do whatever you can, within 5 minutes from now, feel the terror of Death!"

The e-mail also contained threats against Chief Minister of Maharashtra, Vilasrao Deshmukh, and his deputy, R.R. Patil, with the claim, "We wonder at your memory. Have you forgotten the evening of 11 July 2006 so quickly and so easily?"

Furthermore, the threats went on to warn Indian businessman Mukesh Ambani of Reliance Industries to "think-twice" before "usurping and building a citadel on a land in Mumbai that belongs to the Waqf board...lest it turns into horrifying memories for you which you will never ever forget".

The e-mail also reportedly threatened several Bollywood actors, asking them to stop acting.

Police reported that they questioned U.S. national Ken Haywood from whose IP address the threatening email was sent. Haywood's residence in the Sanpada area of Navi Mumbai was raided by ATS officials on 27 July after the IP address from which a threatening email was sent minutes before the Ahmedabad serial blasts was found to be his.

== Casualties ==
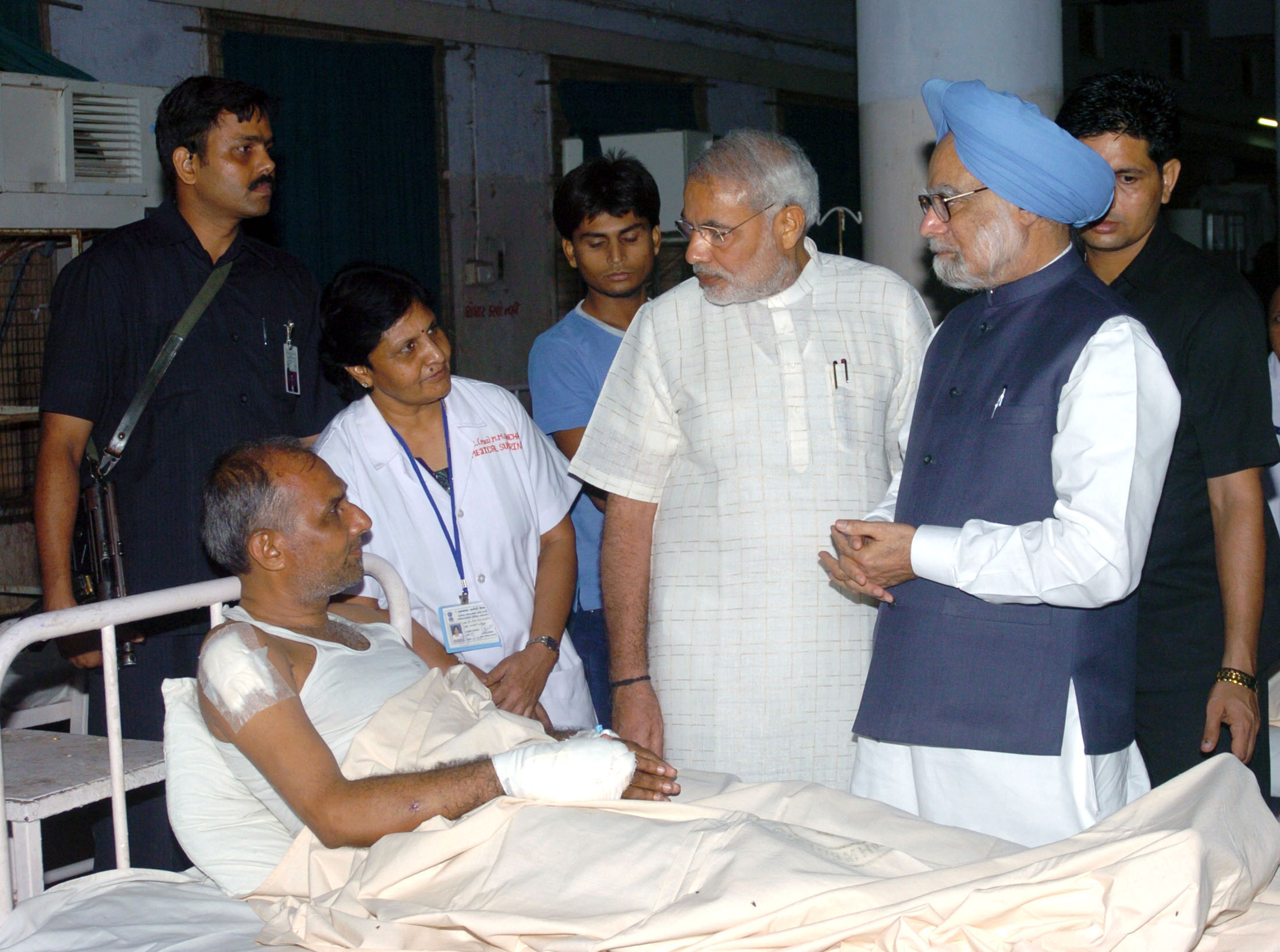
Manmohan Singh and Narendra Modi visit injured victims at a hospital in Ahmadabad.

56 people were killed by the bombing and over 200 people were injured.

Initially, Prime Minister Manmohan Singh sanctioned an ex gratia payment of ₹ 100,000 (US$2,300) to the next of kin of the dead. However, upon visiting Ahmedabad, he raised the ex gratia figure to ₹ 350,000 (US$8,050).In addition, he also announced a compensation of ₹ 50,000 (US$1,200) for those injured in the blasts.

Gujarat Chief Minister Narendra Modi announced a compensation of Rs 500,000 (US$11,500) to each victim of the bomb blasts.

== Investigations ==
Harkat-ul-Jihad-al-Islami has claimed the responsibility of the blasts. The email mentioned that "the innocent Muslims arrested in the (Mumbai), bomb blast case are being tried for years and years."

Union Home Secretary Madhukar Gupta said the Centre dispatched one team of bomb experts and decided to convene a meeting of top officials of state governments to discuss the situation arising out of the recent explosions.

According to the Times of India the intelligence community believes that both blasts of Bangalore and Ahmedabad were executed by a network of Wahabi fundamentalists masquerading as Indian Mujahideen.

=== Leads in the case ===
- Several TV channels stated that they had received an e-mail from a terror outfit called Indian Mujahideen claiming responsibility for the terror attacks. This e-mail has been traced to a locality in Navi Mumbai. This outfit in the past claimed responsibility for the Jaipur bombings on 13 May 2008.
- The police investigation has centered around the claims made in two phone calls.

Forensic sketch released to media on 27 July 2008

- A doctor who was visiting one of the hospitals where one of the blasts occurred has claimed to have overheard a person talking on his cellphone saying, "Bangalore was a failure, however Ahmedabad will be successful and we will celebrate if God wishes.". A sketch of this person, shown alongside, was released. The doctor described the suspected culprit as being around "30–34 years old; wearing a pink shirt; clean shaven; and seemingly an educated person."
- A person has claimed to have received two suspicious phone calls at around 8:00pm IST. In one of the phone calls, it is reported that the caller said, "Ejaz, kaam ho gaya hai?", which translates to "Ejaz, has the job been done?"
- Two cars, both stolen Maruti Wagon R models with vehicle license plates reading "GJ-6-CD 3569" and "GJ-5-CD 2908" were also found in Surat. One of the cars had four live bombs which were defused. In addition, a wooden box with white powder, wires, a battery and shrapnel was also found near Nupur hospital. The cars used for bombings in Ahmedabad and those that were defused in Surat were eventually traced to Navi Mumbai, from where they had been stolen on 7 and 15 July 2008. Investigations revealed that they were subsequently laden with explosives in Vadodara, before being brought to Ahmedabad and Surat.
- On 30 July 2008, it was reported that the police had found CCTV footage of the driver of one of the cars used for the bombings. The photo was obtained from a toll booth near Pune. It had been earlier established that the bombers had stolen the cars from Navi Mumbai before driving it to Gujarat. The car used in the blast at the Ahmedabad Civil Hospital was driven 6 times between Ahmedabad and Surat between 7 and 24 July.
- On 4 August 2008, the Gujarat police claimed to have their first breakthrough in the case with the identification of the shop from where the LPG cylinders used for the blasts were bought. The police also claimed that the crates in which the bombs were planted were made from locally purchased wood.

=== Suspects ===
- The Hindustan Times reported on 28 July 2008 that police and intelligence officials had zeroed in on three masterminds behind the blasts. The suspects, Rasool Khan Yakoob Khan Pathan alias Rasool 'Party', Sohail Khan and Mufti Sufiyan, are suspected to be key operatives of either the Lashkar-e-Toiba (LeT) or the Harkat-ul-Jihad-al-Islami (HuJI). They are also believed to have got to Pakistan after the 2002 Gujarat riots.
- On 29 July 2008, the police detained three suspects, Abdul Qadir, Hasil Mohammad and Hussain Ibrahim, near Limdi on Rajkot-Ahmedabad highway in Surendranagar district, while they were leaving Ahmedabad soon after the blasts
- On 30 July 2008, it was reported on Rediff that the Intelligence Bureau (IB) believed two men, Rasool Khan Parti and Mohammad Sufiya Ahmed Patangiya, who are currently living at Farahan Arcade Gulistan in Karachi were the masterminds behind both the Ahmedabad and the 2008 Bangalore serial blasts. They were previously residents of Hyderabad in Andhra Pradesh, and are members of Harkat-ul-Jihad-al-Islami. The Gujarat Police has been looking for them in connection to the murder of former Gujarat state minister Haren Pandya.
- On 16 August 2008, the Gujarat Police announced that they had solved the case, making it the fastest terrorism case to be solved in recent years. According to the Gujarat Director General of Police P.C.Pande, Mufti Abu Bashir was the mastermind behind the blasts, and up to 10 of his accomplices had been arrested.
- On 20 November 2008, the Gujarat Police claimed that Amir Raza Khan, a HuJI operative from Kolkata now in Pakistan, was also the mastermind of the blasts. In a chargesheet filed by the Crime Branch, SIMI members Safdar Nagori, Hafez Hussain, Sibli Abdul Karim, Kamruddin Nagori, Amil Parvez and Mufti Abu Basher planned the attack and asked Abdus Subhan alias Tauqeer and Qayamuddin Kapadia for executing the blasts. SIMI members organised terror training camps in Waghamon in Kerala and Halol near Vadodara. Qayamuddin and Tauqeer then held a meeting with their local contacts in the city for arrangements of logistics and support to carry out the conspiracy. The local contacts were those who were associated with SIMI before it was banned in 2001 by the Central Government.

=== Arrests ===
- Maulana Abdul Halim, a suspected Students Islamic Movement of India (SIMI) activist, was arrested from Dani Limda in the heart of Ahmedabad on 27 July 2008. He was alleged to be involved in instigating the Muslim youth after the 2002 Gujarat violence and sending them to Uttar Pradesh for terror training. Charges have also been laid on him for sending 33 youths for terror training to Pakistan in 2003. After his arrest, he was remanded to a 14-day police custody by the Metropolitan Magistrate in Ahmedabad.
- On 15 August, the Gujarat police arrested Mufti Abu Bashir, and nine others, in connection to the bombings. Bashir belongs to Binapara village in Azamgarh district of eastern Uttar Pradesh, and was believed to be a SIMI activist.
- On 24 October, a SIMI activist, Abdul Razik Mansuri, a resident of Gomtipur area Nagda district, Madhya Pradesh, had been arrested along with Harun Rashid, a Gujrat residence and send to Gujarat for questioning. The Joint Commissioner of Police for the crime branch, Ashish Bhatia, said: "He was arrested from the Nagda district in Madhya Pradesh by our team. He was there staying with some of his relative. We have brought him to Ahmedabad for interrogation." He added that Mansuri was likely to be produced before a court in Ahmedabad to be remanded to judicial custody.
- On 11 November, the Madhya Pradesh Anti-Terror Squad (ATS) arrested Qayamuddin Kapadia, a top-ranking member of SIMI and a key conspirator and executor of the attack, In Ujjain. Police claimed that Kapadia admitted his involvement in the Ahmedabad blasts, and that he, along with Abdul Subhan Qureshi alias Tauqeer of Mumbai and Riaz Bhatkal of Karnataka, collaborated with the SIMI cell led by Atif to carry out the Delhi blasts. Atif was later killed in an encounter with special cell of Delhi Police.
- On 13 November, Rafiuddin Kapadia, the brother of the key accused, Qayamuddin Kapadia, was arrested by the city police of Ahmedabad. His arrest took the toll of the total held by the police to 43. The Joint Commissioner of Police, Ashish Bhatia, who is heading the probe in the serial blasts case, said: "We have arrested Rafiuddin Kapadia, brother of Qayamuddin. He was present at the SIMI training camp in Halol near Vadodara. He originally hails from Vadodara and was arrested today from Ahmedabad by the crime branch officials."
- On 26 March 2012, Maharashtra ATS arrested one blast suspect Mohammed Abrar Babu Khan alias Abrar Shaikh in an encounter in Sambhajinagar. Khaleel Qureshi was killed and Mohammed Shakeer was wounded in the encounter. All are alleged to be members of terrorist group Indian Mujahideen. A police constable was also injured during the firing.
- On 19 June 2016, Gujarat Anti-Terrorism Squad, arrested Nasir Rangrez from Belgaum.

=== Legal case ===
Controversy arose in the court case of the 26 accused as the state was alleged to have suppressed the legal rights of the accused. On 23 October lawyers of the accused walked out in protest against the stand taken by the Metropolitan Magistrate. The lawyers wanted to meet the accused alone, however, they had moved an application stating that police did not allow them to meet their clients alone and that the Court should direct the police not to remain present while they were talking to the accused. The Metropolitan Magistrate countered that it was not possible as police had to be with the accused. He is said to have hinted at collusion between the lawyers and the accused, causing a walk out by the accused's lawyers. The next day, in two different cases, the designated Metropolitan Court remanded all the 26 accused to police custody until 31 October.

As per the legal rules police have to file a chargesheet in any case before 90 days of the first arrest of the case. However, on 11 November, about three and half months after blasts and the late July arrest, the Gujarat police filed a chargesheet, pertaining to the city civil hospital blast and L G hospital blast case, in a court naming 26 people, all with alleged linked to SIMI, as accuseds in the case. A 2,000-page chargesheet was filed in the court of the Metropolitan Magistrate, G M Patel. The accused included SIMI activists Mufti Abu Basher, Safdar Nagori and Sajid Mansuri. The chargesheet also listed the names of 50 absconders, and that police had so far examined 511 potential witnesses.

=== Similarities ===
Similarities between the Bangalore and Ahmedabad bombings were investigated, where the former suffered from eight blasts and the latter 21. Union Minister of State for Home Affairs Prakash Jaiswal told reporters in Kanpur that the similarities between this and the Bangalore blasts was that both "blasts were of low intensity" and were planted in crowded areas. Furthermore, both states – Karnataka and Gujarat – have BJP led governments.

== Further threats ==
The threat of terror continued even after Ahmedabad blasts. The Gujarat police discovered an active bomb which was set to detonate at 12:00am IST in Hatkeshwar, Maninagar. A bomb squad was quick to respond and successfully managed to defuse the bomb in front of a large crowd, which rose to jubilation and applause upon bomb's defusion.

=== Kerala ===
A phone call from Pakistan to a Karnataka journalist claimed there would be more blasts in Kerala on Sunday. Kerala police chief Raman Srivastava said: "I have been informed by the DGP of Karnataka about the terror threat to Kerala. We spoke to the journalist concerned, who said he had received two calls today – one at 1 pm and another at 3:30 pm."

=== Surat ===
On the following Monday, just days after the Ahmedabad blasts, another bomb was found in Varachha area of Surat. The bomb was placed near an electricity transmitter and contained a packet 700–800 grams of ammonium nitrate, a packet of shrapnel, two detonators, one battery, and a circuit. This was found after the two car bombs that were discovered immediately after Ahmedabad attacks.

On Tuesday, 29 July, eighteen bombs were found in Surat, and were subsequently defused. They were found mainly in the diamond-processing and residential areas of Surat, within a span of just four hours. According to the Times of India, a top government official believed that the planting of so many "unexploded" bombs was probably a means to divert attention of the police from the ongoing blast probe. After Gujarat Chief Minister Narendra Modi visited the city another bomb was found and defused by a bomb disposal squad. All in all, 23 bombs were found in three days in Surat.

Forensic investigations revealed that the bombs had not exploded because the circuits had been wrongly assembled. The police were not sure whether that was on purpose or a way to estimate the reaction time of the bomb squad, for planning future attacks.

=== Rajasthan ===
Three bombs were detected on the road in Pali district, near Marwar Junction in Rajasthan. The bombs, put in half-litre oil containers, were planted on the Marwar-Ranawas Road at gap of one km and were spotted by onlookers. The box carried a bundle of fuse wire, 30–40 marbles, 8 iron plates, and detonator. There was no timer nor any electronic device attached to the explosives. The bombs were defused by the bomb squad.

=== Tamil Nadu ===
In Tamil Nadu, Sheikh Abdul Ghaffoor, 39, was arrested with an alleged plan of carrying out bombings on Independence Day, 15 August 2008. The plot included bombing the state capital Chennai along with three other cities in Tamil Nadu and at least six trains. Meenakshi Amman Temple in Madurai is believed to be on top of the list for such terror attack. The man was detained with a large cache of explosives and two timer devices. Apparently, it is believed that the plot was revealed by an arrested leader, P Ali Abdullah, of a banned organisation, who has been serving sentences in an Indian jail since 2003. Chennai city police later on 1 August 2008 announced that the arrests were not linked with either the Ahmedabad or Bangalore blasts.

=== Kolkata ===
An E-Mail was sent to Kolkata on 29 July 2008 to bomb 8 different locations in Kolkata. Subsequently, high alert was placed in Kolkata but the e-mail turned out to be a hoax.

=== New Delhi ===
Another email was sent to the Japanese Embassy in New Delhi on 30 July 2008 to bomb several locations in Delhi. The mail was forwarded to the Delhi Police from the embassy and the city was placed under a Red Alert. The email threatened to bomb Sarojini Nagar, which had been a target in the October 2005 bombings. Further to these threats Japan closed its embassy in New Delhi on 31 July 2008 and also issue warning to its citizens living in India to avoid crowded places like markets and train stations. Nevertheless, the initial examination of a youth arrested for sending emails to the Japanese embassy indicated that he might suffer from some mental problems. Delhi police revealed that the youth who sent the email was frustrated of a failed visa application to the embassy and the email threat was a hoax.

== Criticism ==
In criticizing the central government Ajai Sahni, executive director of the Institute for Conflict Management said "India's police to population ratio is one of the lowest in the world, barring the poorer African countries. There is a high deficit of personnel in intelligence gathering. The IB has barely 3,500 field officers. We need to address these shortcomings."

P R Chari, a research professor at the Institute for Peace and Conflict Studies, said "the blasts were a demonstration of their (terrorists) capabilities and a terse reminder of the state's helplessness."

BJP president Rajnath Singh also blamed the UPA government for its "soft approach" to terrorism that has allowed terrorists to grow bolder. He also took the government to task for repealing POTA and for "sleeping over the anti-terror laws like GUJCOCA (an anti-terror law adopted by the Gujarat Assembly)". Gujarat Congress chief Siddharth Patel said: "'The Gujarat government has failed miserably on the law and order front." Adding that the terror attack pointed to the "total failure' of the state's intelligence machinery."

Sushma Swaraj, a senior leader of the BJP, at a press conference in Delhi, claimed the ruling UPA government had a conspiratorial hand in the blasts to divert attention from the allegations of bribery as well as to gain Muslim votes. The Times of India called her comments "scandalous" and "outrageous remarks". The Congress party's spokesman, Shakeel Ahmed said that Sushma Swaraj should be "tried for treason" and her comments have "given a clean chit to terrorists and anti-national, disruptive forces both within and outside India". Later on 31 July 2008, BJP's spokesperson, Prakash Javdekar, clarified that the allegation of conspiracy made by Sushma Swaraj was her personal view and to the contrary the party viewed the attacks not as a conspiracy of the Congress party but as "an attack on the nation". Although Sushma Swaraj's comments were critically commented by some media and her own party, T. K. Arun, a columnist of The Economic Times suggested that investigations should also look into her point that some of the blasts occurred in Muslim locals of Ahmedabad and "that a large share of those getting slaughtered by the terrorists are Muslims".

== Reaction ==
=== Hindu–Muslim Unity ===
It is widely believed that the attacks were carried out to bring about the levels of unrest Gujarat had seen after the Godhra train burning. It is believed that by targeting communally sensitive areas such as Sarkhej, Muslims attackers wanted to provoke and re-ignite communal disharmony and riots. Peaceful demonstrations held across Gujarat by both Hindus and Muslims called the attacks acts of cowardice. Such demonstrations of unity were also held in Delhi and Bhopal where Hindus and Muslims held candlelight vigils. Upon his visit to the region, Prime Minister Singh praised Gujarat's unity saying "I commend the people of Gujarat for the resilience they have shown. These terrorist acts are aimed at destroying our social fabric, undermining communal harmony and demoralising our people".

President Pratibha Patil, Prime Minister Manmohan Singh, Vice-president Hamid Ansari, Chief Minister Narendra Modi, all condemned the blasts and appealed for calm. Minister of State for Home Affairs Shakeel Ahmed expressed surprise and shock at the successive attacks. Home Minister Shivraj Patil said: "we should assess the situation correctly and try to help the people, who have suffered and plan to see that these things do not happen afterwards."

Opposition Bharatiya Janata Party leader L. K. Advani condemned the blasts, and demanded that both Gujarat and Rajasthan should be allowed to go for their own anti-terror legislation.

The Bahujan Samaj Party questioned intelligence agencies failure to be alert to the blast conspiracy, and urged the state Congress to ask the UPA to approve GUJCOC act. The Vishva Hindu Parishad announced it planned a nationwide anti-jehadi movement from 28 July, and urged the government to act against terrorism "before it is late." AIADMK general secretary J. Jayalalithaa called for the revival of special act like POTA to "effectively counter terrorists and extremist outfits".

Others who condemned the blasts included the head of the Congress Party, Sonia Gandhi, Union Minister of State for Home Affairs Prakash Jaiswal, CPI M, the All India Muslim Forum, Sri Sri Ravi Shankar, Sanchetna, Sahrwaru, Safar, AMWA, Muslim Majlise Mushavirat, Sarkhej Muslim Welfare Organisation, Ahmedabad Muslim Welfare Society, Sirat Committee, Aman Samuday, Anhad, Swabhiman Andolan, Lok Kala Manch, Samarpan, Sarvoday Sanskrutik Manch, Bharatiya Muslim Mahila Andolan, Bharatiya Moolnivasi Janjagran Abhiyan, and Action Aid (Gujarat).

=== International ===
Countries

- Pakistan: Prime Minister Yousuf Raza Gillani condemned the bomb attacks in Bangalore and Ahmedabad, describing them as "acts of senseless violence against innocent persons". The Foreign Ministry released a statement saying, "Prime Minister Yousuf Raza Gillani has strongly condemned the acts of terrorist violence in the Indian cities of Ahmedabad and Bangalore and expressed deep sympathies with the bereaved families and the victims of these dastardly acts of senseless violence against innocent persons."
- United States: The US embassy released a statement "The US condemns the vicious terror attacks in Bangalore on Friday and Ahmedabad on Saturday" and extended condolences to the families of the bereaved.
- Sri Lanka: Sri Lankan President Mahinda Rajapaksa condemned the serial blasts in a statement saying "I unreservedly condemn the cowardly terrorist attacks in Ahmedabad, India, yesterday, killing and injuring a large number of persons, as well as the terrorist attacks in Bangalore the previous day". The Executive President said "These wanton acts of terror by the forces are ranged against democracy...Sri Lanka being a country gravely affected by the scourge of terrorism for more than two decades, we understand well how the manipulators of terror seek to destroy harmonious relations among communities and the democratic traditions that prevail in our societies...My Government and I share the determination and commitment of the Government and people of India not to yield to this sustained threat of terror from those who seek to achieve their ends by inflicting maximum damage to the lives and limbs of civilians, disrupting their day to day lives and society at large."
- Afghanistan: Afghan President Hamid Karzai called for a "collective struggle against terrorism which threatens the stability of the region. Terrorism is a serious threat against the international community and this evil phenomenon must be fought collectively."
- France: French President Nicolas Sarkozy wrote a letter to Prime Minister Manmohan Singh and offered to further strengthen cooperation in the battle against terrorism. He condemned the blasts saying they were "blind, cowardly and inhuman". In his letter he said, "On this occasion, I wish to assure you of the full solidarity of the 27 member-states of the EU and their determination to fight alongside the Indian government to eradicate the scourge of terrorism"

Unions

- United Nations: Secretary-General Ban Ki-moon has condemned in the "strongest terms" the series of bombings in Bengaluru and Ahmedabad and stressed that no cause or grievance can justify terrorist acts.
- European Union: European Union condemned the attack in a statement saying "The Presidency of the Council of European Union presents its deepest condolences to India, its government and its people, as well as to the victims and their families".

== Trial and verdict ==
Trial merged 35 separated cases as a single case and was heard in a special court of Judge A. R. Patel in Ahmedabad. The trial began in 2009 and lasted for about 13 years. The hearing was concluded in September 2021. On 8 February 2022 the verdict was delivered acquitting 28 due to lack of acceptable evidence while 49 were convicted. The sentences were provided on 18 February 2022, including 38 death sentences and 11 life imprisonments. The Gujarat High Court upheld the sentences on 7 July 2026. The Gujarat High court also provided compensation to the relatives of the victims.

List of convicts
#	Name	Native State	Notes
1	Zahid Sheikh	Gujarat	
2	Imran Sheikh	Gujarat	
3	Iqbal Sheikh	Gujarat	
4	Samsuddin Sheikh	Gujarat	
5	Javed Sheikh	Gujarat	
6	Asif Sheikh	Maharashtra	
7	Atique Khiljee	Rajasthan	
8	Mehdi Ansari	Rajasthan	
9	Safiq Ansari	Madhya Pradesh	
10	Rafiuddin	Gujarat	
11	Arif Mirza	Uttar Pradesh	
12	Kabumuddin	Gujarat	
13	Sibyl Muslim	Kerala	
14	Safdar Nagori	Madhya Pradesh	
15	Hafiz Mulla	Karnataka	
16	Sajid Mansoori	Gujarat	
17	Afzal Usmani	Maharashtra	
18	Sarfuddin Itti	Telangana	
19	Md. Sadiq Sheikh	Maharashtra	
20	Md Arif Sheikh	Maharashtra	
21	Akbar Chaudhary	Maharashtra	
22	Fazal Durani	Maharashtra	
23	Nausad Sayed	Gujarat	
24	Ahmed Barelvi	Gujarat	
25	Rafiq Afidi	Gujarat	
26	Amin Sheik	Rajasthan	
27	Md. Mobin Khan	Uttar Pradesh	
28	Md. Ansar	Gujarat	
29	Gyasuddin Ansari	Gujarat	
30	Arif Kagzi	Gujarat	
31	Usmaan	Gujarat	
32	Yunus Mansoori	Gujarat	
33	Imran Pathan	Rajasthan	
34	Abubasar Sheikh	Uttar Pradesh	
35	Abaas Sameza	Gujarat	
36	Saifu Ansari	Uttar Pradesh	
37	Md. Saif Sheikh	Uttar Pradesh	
38	Zishan Sheikh	Uttar Pradesh	
39	Jia-ur-Rahman	Uttar Pradesh	
40	Tanveer Pathan	Uttar Pradesh	
41	Abraar Maniyar	Uttar Pradesh	
42	Shaduli Karim	Kerala	
43	Tausif Pathan	Maharashtra	
44	Md. Ali Ansari	Madhya Pradesh	
45	Md. Ismail	Gujarat	
46	Kamruddin	Madhya Pradesh	
47	Aleem Kazi	Madhya Pradesh	
48	Aniq Sayed	Maharashtra	
49	Md. Shaqil	Uttar Pradesh	

Number convicts Per States and union territories of India
#	States / union territories	Convict Count	% of convicts
1	Gujarat	18	36.7
2	Uttar Pradesh	10	20.4
3	Maharashtra	8	16.3
4	Madhya Pradesh	5	10.2
5	Rajasthan	4	8.2
6	Kerala	2	4.1
7	Karnataka	1	2.0
8	Telangana	1	2.0
Total		49	100%

== See also ==
- List of Islamist terrorist attacks
- List of terrorist incidents in 2008
- Abdul Subhan Qureshi
- Allegations of state terrorism committed by Pakistan
