= 2008 Bangalore serial blasts =

Terrorist attack in Bangalore, India

- Location: Bangalore, Karnataka, India
- Date: 25 July 2008
- Attack type: Bombings
- Deaths: 1
- Injuries: 20
- Perpetrator: Suspected: Students Islamic Movement of India or Lashkar-e-Taiba (as per The Times of India)

The 2008 Bangalore serial blasts occurred on 25 July 2008 in Bangalore, Karnataka, India. A series of nine bombs exploded in which 1 person was killed and 20 injured. According to the Bangalore City Police, the blasts were caused by low-intensity crude bombs triggered by timers.

India already suffered from a similar series of blasts in Jaipur, in May 2008.

The Times of India has reported that either the banned organisation Students Islamic Movement of India or the infamous Pakistani militant organisation Lashkar-e-Taiba (LeT), could be behind these blasts. The Intelligence Bureau is not ruling out the involvement of these organisations, however the police maintain that it is too early to attribute blame to anyone.

The bombings were followed by the 2008 Ahmedabad bombings one day later and the attack is said to have a relation with the 26/11 attacks, which occurred on the same year.

== The bombings ==
It was initially reported that three blasts took place at around 1:30 pm IST. Later reports indicated that four low-intensity blasts occurred: One at Nayandahalli (1:30 PM IST), two in Madiwala (at 1:50 pm IST), and the last in Adugodi (2:10 pm). Other blasts were reported from areas including the Mallya hospital, Langford Road and Richmond Circle. The Madiwala blast took place at a check post, behind The Forum, a popular shopping mall in Bangalore.

It has been reported that gelatin sticks were used in the bombs. Police indicated that all bombs had timer devices attached to them and that mobile phones were used to trigger the bombs. The blasts were low-intensity but occurred in crowded areas.

- 1st blast: 1.20 pm, Madiwala bus depot
- 2nd blast: 1.25 pm, Mysore road
- 3rd blast: 1.40 pm, Adugodi
- 4th blast: 2.10 pm, Koramangala
- 5th blast: 2.25 pm, Vittal Mallya road
- 6th blast: 2.35 pm, Langford Town
- 7th blast: Richmond Town

There was another bomb found on 26 July 2008 in Bangalore near Forum Mall, Koramangala which was defused successfully by the Bomb Detection Squad.

== Casualties ==
One person was killed and 20 injured in the attacks. The confirmed dead was a woman waiting at a bus shelter in Madiwala on the Hosur road; her husband and another person were seriously injured. The injured were admitted to the St. Johns Hospital.

In response to the attack Prime Minister Singh sanctioned an ex gratia payment of Rs one lakh to the relatives of those dead and Rs 50,000 to those injured in the blasts.

== Reactions ==
President Pratibha Patil, Prime Minister, Manmohan Singh, Leader of the opposition L. K. Advani, Vice-president Hamid Ansari, and Chief Minister of Karnataka, B. S. Yeddyurappa all condemned the violence and appealed for calm and communal harmony.

All India Anna Dravida Munnetra Kazhagam (AIADMK) general secretary J. Jayalalithaa called for the revival of special act like POTA to effectively counter terrorists and extremist outfits. The All India Muslim Forum also "strongly condemned" the attack.

== Impacts ==
Calls by concerned and panicked citizens resulted in the telephone networks being jammed. Malls, schools and cinema halls across the city were shut down, and the police cordoned off the blast sites.

The effect of the blast on the Sensex was immediately visible with losses exceeding 3.5% reported on Friday after the Bangalore blasts. The 30-share BSE index was down 3.7%, or 529.28 points at 14,228.81, with 23 components in the red. The 50-issue NSE index was down 2.9 percent at 4,305.30.

The government has issued a statement that IT companies in Bangalore were not the target of the blast. This was reaffirmed when major IT companies based in the city -like Wipro and Infosys- reported that the blasts had no impact on their operations and that all employees were safe. Employees were, however, urged to leave for home early. A new security plan for IT and other industries was announced by Minister for Home Affairs Shivraj Patil immediately after the Bangalore serial blasts. Under the new amendment of law Central Industrial Security Force personnel could be used to safeguard private sector industries which till now was limited to public sector undertakings (PSUs).

== Investigation ==
No one has claimed responsibility for the bombings. The Bangalore Police Commissioner, Shankar Bidari, termed the blasts "an act of miscreants" trying to disturb peace in the city. The Union Home Ministry of India named the Pakistan-based Lashkar-e-Toiba and Students Islamic Movement of India, as the suspects.

The Bangalore Police said that the attack "bore some hallmarks" of the Bangladesh-based militant group Harkat-ul-Jihad-al-Islami (HuJI).

The Central Government of India had warned the Karnataka state government one day earlier that the state was high on the terror hitlist along with six other Indian states – Andhra Pradesh, Rajasthan, Uttar Pradesh, Maharashtra, Punjab, and Assam – and Union Territory Delhi.

There is a possible connection with the Andhra and Varanasi attacks. An official was quoted saying "The aim of these groups, whether HuJI or LeT or Simi, is clear. Bangalore and Hyderabad are being chosen as targets to create panic in the US as the cities house [the] biggest IT companies from the US." The Andhra – Karnataka link involves Raziuddin Nasir, a Hyderabad resident, and his aide Hafiz Khan Adnan from Bangalore, who was arrested near Hubli in Karnataka this year. Furthermore, another clear link between the terror elements in both blasts is the explosive material used. In the Bangalore blasts an explosive with an ammonium nitrate base was used, while in the Gokul Chat and Lumbini Park explosions in Hyderabad a similar ammonium nitrate base was used. These were also of low intensity with the aim of creating panic. Like the Malegaon and Mecca Masjid blasts, it took place on a Friday during or just after the prayers. In response to these blasts security was also beefed up in Andhra Pradesh.

It was also reported that sleeper cells have gained a firm foothold in Karnataka with the discovery of terror camps in the Karnataka forest early in the year. In this vein, near-simultaneous blasts – all having the footprint of the jehadi network that had carried out blasts in Varanasi, Jaipur, Mumbai and elsewhere – point to the strong foothold terrorists have made in the city.

On 29 July, the Bangalore police Anti Terrorism Squad (ATS) arrested a SIMI activist named Sameer Sadiq in connection with the blasts. According to the police, Sadiq had played a key role in the Surat riots. He was staying at Gurapanapalya in Bangalore, the area which incidentally housed the SIMI office before it had been banned.

On 30 July 2008, the Intelligence Bureau (IB) indicated that two men – Rasool Khan Parti and Mohammad Sufiya Ahmed Patangiya – currently living at Farahan Arcade Gulistan in Karachi were the masterminds behind the Ahmedabad and the Bangalore serial blasts. They used to reside in Hyderabad, Andhra Pradesh. Both are possibly members of Harkat-ul-Jihad-al-Islami. The Gujarat Police has been looking for them in connection to the murder of former Gujarat state minister Haren Pandya.

On 5 February 2009, Karnataka Police arrested Muhammed Zakaria, then 19 years old, under the Unlawful Activities (Prevention) Act. He was accused of making timers for the blasts. Two witnesses have retracted their testimony alleging that the police made them witnesses and the case is fabricated. In March 2020, Zakariya's mother, Biyumma filed a Public Interest Litigation (PIL) in the Supreme Court seeking to declare the Unlawful Activities (Prevention) Act (UAPA), as unconstitutional. Advocate Hashir K Muhammed created a documentary about Zakariya in 2017 titled 'A Documentary about disappearance.'

In December 2009, two Lashkar-e-Taiba terrorists including Lashkar's South India commander Thadiyantevide Nasir were arrested by the Indian Forces from the Bangladesh border. Interrogation of them lead to significant evidences to the serial blasts in several Indian cities in 2008 especially the Bangalore blasts. Nasir's arrest paved way for the arrest of several Muslim youth from Kerala involved in terrorism, as well as evidences for terror links of Kerala politician Abdul Nasser Madani. Madani's wife Soofiya Madani was arrested by Kerala Police on 19 December 2009 on the ground that she had taken an active role in Kalamassery Tamil Nadu state transportation corporation bus burning case. The remand report presented by police in the court said Soofiya had confessed to her role in the case and links with Laskhar-e-Toiba South India commander Tadiyantavide Nasir. However, Soofiya's counsel said the charges were false. Nasir was Madani's ‘'enemy'’ and had lied to police to implicate Soofiya, he claimed. But the prosecution pointed out that the Kerala high court while rejecting her anticipatory bail plea had said that the bus burning case was an act of terror. T Nazir is involved in cases ranging from the attempted murder of former kerala chief minister [E K Nayanar] to the recent Bangalore bomb blast for which he is under the custody of Karnataka police. Bangalore police have already obtained ample proof that T Nazir and his associates like Abdul Sattar have good links with the Madani family.

== See also ==
- List of terrorist incidents in 2008
- Allegations of state terrorism committed by Pakistan
