= Jaipur bombings =

2008 terrorist bombings in Rajasthan, India

- Location: 26.9260°N 75.8235°E; Jaipur, Rajasthan, India
- Date: 13 May 2008; 19:35 (UTC+5:30)
- Weapons: Bicycle bombs, ammonium nitrate, RDX
- Deaths: 80
- Injuries: 216
- Perpetrators: Indian Mujahideen (claimed responsibility); Harkat-ul-Jihad-al-Islami Bangladesh (also suspected)
- Motive: Islamic terrorism
- Accused: 5
- Charges: Indian Penal Code, Unlawful Activities (Prevention) Act, Explosives Act, Murder, attempt to murder, conspiracy for waging war against government, sedition, promoting enmity between groups and criminal conspiracy
- Verdict: Acquittal

The Jaipur bombings were a series of nine synchronized bomb blasts that took place on 13 May 2008 within a span of 15 minutes at locations in Jaipur, the capital city of the Indian state of Rajasthan and a tourist destination. Official reports confirmed that 63 died while 216 or more people were injured. The bombings shocked most of India and resulted in widespread condemnation from leaders across the world with many countries showing solidarity with India in its fight against terrorism.

This was the first time terrorists had targeted Jaipur, India's tenth largest city and one of its most popular tourist destinations. The bombs went off near historic monuments at one of the busiest times of the day. One of the bombs exploded close to Jaipur's most famous landmark, the historic Hawa Mahal (palace of winds).

Two days after the blasts, a previously unknown Islamic terrorist group known as Indian Mujahideen, sent an e-mail to Indian media in which they claimed responsibility for the attacks and said they would "demolish the faith (Hinduism)" of the "infidels of India". Though the Indian authorities said that the e-mail was genuine, they also added that there were some contradictions and the primary motive of the e-mail might be to mislead investigating agencies. Indian Home Ministry sources said that a Bangladesh-based organization, Harkat-ul-Jihad-al-Islami Bangladesh (HuJI) or "Islamic Holy War Movement", was suspected to be behind the attack. The police were also able to find credible evidence linking the suspected bombers to Bangladeshi militants which resulted in a backlash against illegal Bangladeshi migrants in Rajasthan.

In December 2019, four (Mohammed Saif, Mohammed Sarwar Azmi, Saifur Rehman and Mohammed Salman) of the five accused Indian Mujahideen terrorists were convicted and sentenced to death by a special court in Rajasthan under the Indian Penal Code, the Unlawful Activities (Prevention) Act, and the Explosives Act, in eight cases registered by the Anti-Terrorism Squad. One of the accused was acquitted for lack of evidence. However, in March 2023, all four were acquitted of the charges by the Rajasthan High Court.

== Bombings ==
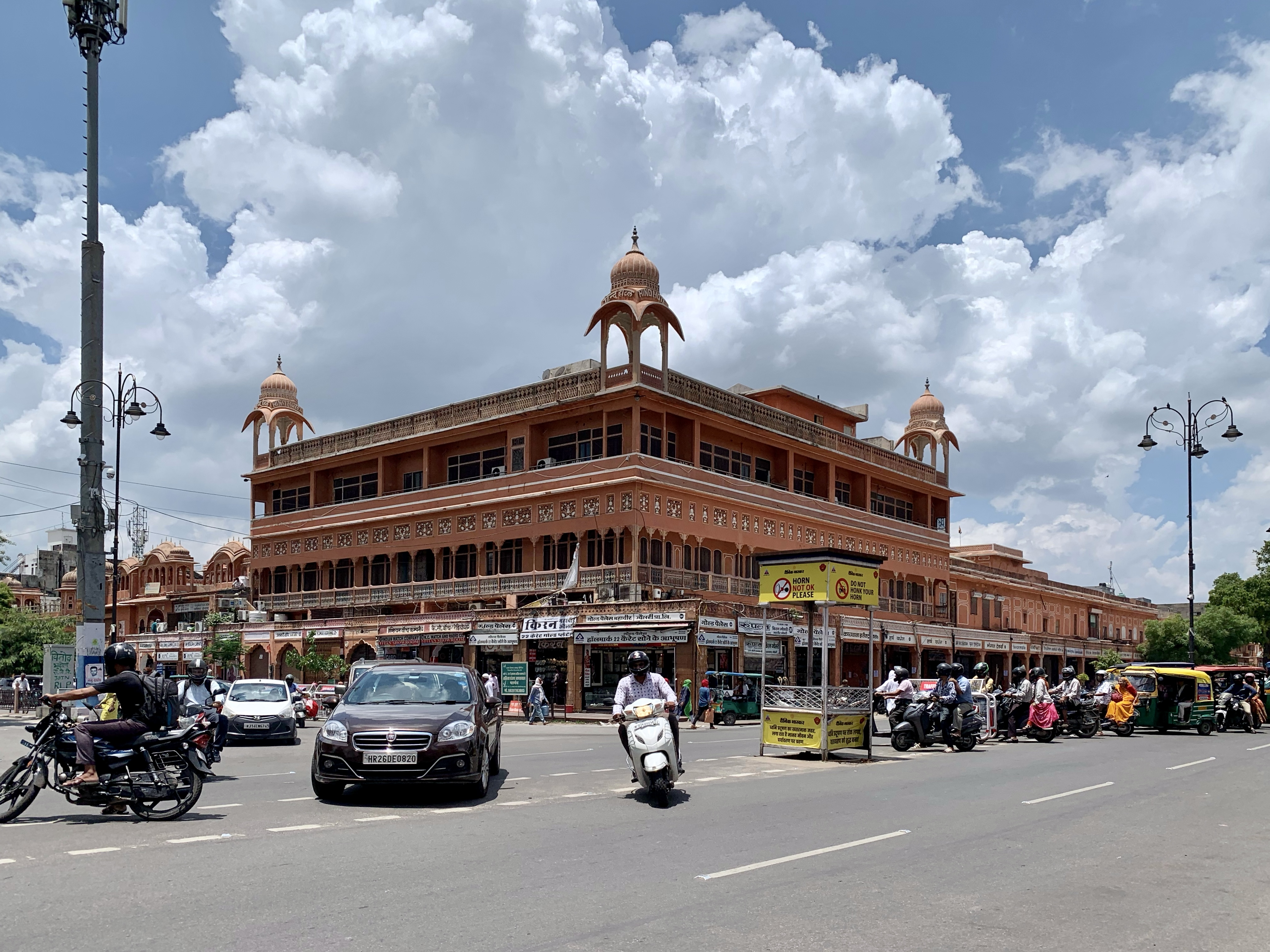
Tripolia Bazar

The following areas were bombed using RDX placed in bicycles:

- Badi Choupad
- Manak Chowk Police Station area
- Johari Bazar
- Tripolia Bazar
- Choti Choupad
- Kotwali area

Nine bombs at seven locations exploded within 15 minutes, starting at 7:10 pm. The blasts were synchronized to inflict maximum casualties. The first two blasts occurred at Manak Chowk and as the crowd ran towards Johri Bazar another two blasts near the National Handloom Centre blocked the exit point, pushing back the panicked crowd towards Tripolia Bazar and Chandpol area, where subsequent blasts caused maximum fatalities.

== Aftermath ==
The serial blasts created panic among Jaipur residents following which several units of police and Indian Paramilitary Forces were deployed throughout the city. Most of the victims were taken to Sawai Man Singh Hospital. The doctors used the mobile phones of the dead to inform the victims' relatives. A curfew was imposed in parts of Jaipur and the state government of Rajasthan had ordered all units of police to maintain extra vigilance across the state. The Government of India deployed several units of the elite National Security Guards in Jaipur to aid the law and order forces in the city. Four hundred men from Rapid Action Force were also sent. A few hours after the blasts, India declared high alert across several major Indian cities including Delhi, Mumbai (Bombay) and Chennai (Madras). Security in other major Indian tourist destinations like Panaji and Agra was also increased. Delhi Police also sent a team to Jaipur to check whether the terrorist attacks there had any links with previous terrorists attacks in Delhi.

=== Investigations ===
India ordered an inquiry into the blasts while the Indian Home Ministry raised concerns that certain 'foreign elements' might be behind the bombings. The police has found credible evidence linking the bombing suspects to Bangladesh-based militants. Consequently, Rajasthan state government took severe measures against illegal Bangladeshi immigrants in the state.

Four people were detained for questioning by Rajasthan police regarding the blasts. A lead has already been traced by the police. Initial police investigations suggested the involvement of several Islamic militant organizations like Bangladesh-based Harkat-ul-Jihad-al-Islami Bangladesh, Student's Islamic Movement of India or Pakistan-based Lashkar-e-Toiba. Concerns are also being raised about the possible involvement of al-Qaeda.

Police officials say that the bomb blasts in Jaipur follow patterns similar to those observed during the bomb blasts in Hyderabad and Varanasi. The Indian Police revealed that the bombs planted were of low intensity but by placing them in highly crowded areas, the terrorists had ensured that the death toll would be high. The Times of India quoted Additional Director General of Rajasthan Police officer as saying that the terrorists had planted "highly explosive RDX" with timers on bicycles, a technique which was also used during the terror attacks in Uttar Pradesh in November 2007 (in which the involvement of Bangladesh's Harkat-ul-Jihad-al-Islami Bangladesh is also suspected). The police found striking similarity between the Jaipur bombings and Hyderabad bombings. On 15 May, a police officer said

About 1.5 kg of Neogel with metal ball-bearings was put in boat-shaped wooden cases in Jaipur and Hyderabad. In both cases, timers were used. The similarities in the signatures of the bombs are shocking.

Police said they had identified the people who had sold bicycles to the attackers. The bicycle sellers said that the bombers spoke Bengali language, adding credibility to police claims that the terrorists might be Bangladeshis. A police official said,

The employees [of the bicycle shop] have told us that they did not look like Rajasthanis and spoke in broken Hindi. In fact they were speaking Bengali, which has again given rise to speculation that the militants were from a Bangladeshi outfit.

On 14 May, the Indian police released a sketch of a suspect. A day later, the police released sketches of three additional suspects. A shop owner in Udaipur claimed he saw one of the suspects a few days back.

=== Claim of responsibility ===
A little-known group Indian Mujahideen claimed responsibility for the attacks and sent a video to Aaj Tak via e-mail supposedly featuring the bicycles wrapped with explosives used during the terror attacks. The address from which the e-mail was sent and a serial number on one of the bicycles was identified. Police officials confirmed that the bicycle used in Choti Choupad blast had the same serial number. However, Rajasthan Chief Minister Vasundhara Raje also suggested that a secondary objective of the e-mail could be to mislead the investigating authorities.

In the e-mail, the group threatened an "open war against India" unless it stops supporting the United States and United Kingdom on "international issues". It also said that it would "demolish the faith [of the] infidels of India".

=== Convictions ===
On 20 December 2019, a Special Court in Jaipur convicted four for the bombings and gave them the death penalty while one was acquitted for lack of evidence. The four are Mohammed Saif, Mohammed Sarwar Azmi, Saifur Rehman and Mohammed Salman. On April 8, 2025, a court in Jaipur sentenced four individuals to life imprisonment for their role in the case. However, in March 2023, all four were acquitted of the charges by the Rajasthan High Court.

=== Domestic reactions ===
"This is not a crime, we are in the middle of a war."

— Vasundhara Raje, Rajasthan Chief Minister

The President of India, Pratibha Patil expressed her grief at the loss of lives in the blasts and appealed for calm while the Prime Minister of India, Manmohan Singh, pledged the Government of India's support to the state Government of Rajasthan and the victims' families. The Prime Minister also said:

The terrorists have the advantage of attacking by stealth but there is no lack of firmness in dealing with this menace. All possible precautions are being taken. It would be premature on my part to comment anything as it will interfere with the investigations.

Singh also defended the Government's intelligence mechanisms saying the number of cases that the intelligence agencies had anticipated and prevented was "significant". He observed:

There are many cases where security agencies have foiled attempts. Many cases were anticipated. I don't want to talk about what they were able to prevent.

Indian Home Minister, Shivraj Patil, conveyed his condolences to the victims' families. The Government of India announced 100,000 INR compensation to the next kin of those dead in the terrorist attacks and 50,000 INR ex gratia to those seriously injured. An emergency meeting of Indian cabinet ministers was also held later during the day. Foreign Minister of India, Pranab Mukherjee, said he was going to raise the issue of 'cross-border terrorism' with Pakistan's government during his visit to Islamabad next week. Indian Finance Minister, P. Chidambaram, said that the blasts won't affect India's business climate. India's National Security Advisor, M.K. Narayanan, said that the intelligence agencies were looking into all possible aspects of the blasts and no major breakthrough in ongoing investigations were made.

The Chief Minister of Rajasthan, Vasundhara Raje, said "I condemn this blast. They have tried to ruin the communal harmony of the state but they will not succeed. Never in the history of Rajasthan such a heinous incident has happened and this is not an attack on the state but on the nation". She also added, "there are some slender leads on which the state agencies are working and its difficult to name any terror outfit at present". The Chief Minister also laid emphasis on a new anti-terror legislation either similar to POTA or to the one in the neighbouring state of Gujarat. She also criticised the President of India for not signing an anti-terror bill passed by the Rajasthan Legislative Assembly in 2006. Raje also expressed her concern that the terrorist attacks in Jaipur will negatively affect the tourism industry there. The Chief Minister also said that Rajasthan will have its own anti-terror force and also proposed a joint task force between Indian states.

India's main opposition party, the Bharatiya Janata Party (BJP), blamed the United Progressive Alliance (UPA)-government for not taking adequate measures against terrorism in India and re-newed calls for POTA were made. The BJP also demanded that Pakistan's Inter-Services Intelligence should be on international terror watch-list. India's Leader of Opposition, L. K. Advani, said "The blasts are reflective of the states' inability to preempt these strikes." Gujarat Chief Minister Narendra Modi accused the UPA government of adopting double standards on terrorism and said, "The UPA-led government at the Centre should make the people realise that it is committed to curb terrorism spreading in our country."

=== Effect on IPL ===
The Indian Premier League (IPL) donated Rs. 60 million (US$1.4 million) to the Chief Minister relief fund. Each of the eight IPL teams donated 5 million INR while each of the five official sponsors donated an additional 4 million INR. Jaipur's local IPL team, Rajasthan Royals, demanded extra security, to which IPL management agreed. All the IPL matches scheduled for Jaipur were temporarily put on hold but IPL Chairman, Lalit Modi, confirmed that Jaipur would host the Rajasthan Royals' match on Saturday. Modi also said that carry-on bags were banned at all venues where the IPL matches are to be played.

== See also ==
- 2008 Ahmedabad bombings
- Bangalore bombings
- List of terrorist incidents in 2008
