= Shafi Armar =

Indian Muslim Terrorist

Mohammed Shafi Armar (Arabic: مُحَمَّد شَافِي عَرمَر; 1989/1991–2015), also known by his online pseudonym Yusuf al-Hindi (Arabic: يُوْسُف الْهِندِيّ, lit. 'Joseph the Indian'), was an Indian Islamic militant, a former member of the Indian Mujahideen (IM), he became the chief of operations for the Islamic State in India. He and his brother Sultan Armar founded the IS affiliates Ansar-ut Tawhid fi Bilad al-Hind (transl. Supporters of Monotheism in the Land of India) and Janood-ul-Khalifa-e-Hind (transl. Caliph's Army of India) encouraging the recruitment of Indian Muslims for jihad in Syria and Afghanistan. The Armar brothers had split from Indian Mujahideen and formed these affiliates after a rift developed between them and IM co-founders Iqbal and Riyaz Bhatkal.

== History ==
He was originally from Bhatkal, North Canara district in Karnataka, South India and is reported to have been born between 1989 and 1991. He became a member of the Indian Mujahideen and in 2008/9, he and his brother Sultan Armar fled to Pakistan in the aftermath of the Batla House encounter.

He and his brother, Sultan, formally split from the IM after a rift developed between them and the IM co-founders Iqbal and Riyaz Bhatkal. They ultimately joined the Islamic State sometime in 2013. After that he was involved via social media in recruiting individuals to carry out attacks in India. In 2016 he was involved in a failed plot in Hyderabad. In May 2016, he was indicted in absentia at Patiala House District court along with five others under Section 120 (conspiracy) of the Indian Penal Code (IPC) and sections 18 and 20 of the Unlawful Activities (Prevention) Act.

In June 2017, he was listed as a Specially Designated National and had any assets frozen by the United States. He, along with his brother, was killed in 2015 in Syria while fighting for the Islamic State, but this was only confirmed in 2019 and several reports of his death emerged in subsequent years (2015, 2017 and 2019). This confusion was due to the fact that his online alias Yusuf al-Hindi was used after his death by different militants.
