= Fayaz Kagzi =

Fayaz Kagzi (16 April 1982 – 4 July 2016) was an Indian bomb maker and suicide bomber from Maharashtra.

Initially recruited by the Students Islamic Movement of India (Indian Mujahideen), he later joined the Pakistani militant group, Lashkar-e-Taiba along with Zabiuddin Ansari. A native of Beed district in the western Indian state of Maharashtra, Kagzi was wanted in India for various terrorist offences including the 2006 Karnavati Express blast, 2006 Aurangabad arms haul, 2010 German Bakery blast, 2012 Jangli Maharaj road serial blast and fled to Pakistan in 2006.

He was reported dead on 4 July 2016 after detonating explosives near the US Consulate in Jeddah, Saudi Arabia. A DNA test confirmed the identity of the bomber as Fayaz Kagzi who is suspected to have joined ISIS.
