= Iqbal Bhatkal =

Founder of Indian Mujahideen, a terrorist organization (born 1970)

- Born: 1970 (age 55–56); Bhatkal, Karnataka, India
- Organization: Indian Mujahideen
- Relatives: Riyaz Bhatkal (brother)

Iqbal Shahbandri (born 1970), known as Iqbal Bhatkal, is an Indian Islamist militant who is the co-founder, ideologue, leader and wanted terrorist of the Indian Mujahideen, an Islamist terrorist group based in India. He is the brother of another IM co-founder Riyaz Bhatkal, and is one of the Indian Mujahideen's three top commanders. Both him and his brother are currently based in Karachi, Pakistan.

== Early life ==
Iqbal Bhatkal was born as Iqbal Shahbandri in the South Indian fishing town of the Bhatkal in the Uttara Kannada district of the state of Karnataka. His brother, Riyaz, was a bright student, but Iqbal was not. He attempted to get his diploma in Construction Technology eighteen times, but failed every time. Then Iqbal changed his field of study to Unani medicine, although his real interests were in religion. He took part in activities of the Islamic movement Tablighi Jamaat and listened to many lectures by Zakir Naik, a Muslim who founded the Islamic Research Foundation. These lectures seemed to have a deep impact of Iqbal and are said to have led him to violence.

== Terrorism ==
He was involved in the Germany bakery blast, which resulted in the death of seventeen and injury of sixty-four people. According to Pune Police, Mohsin Chaudhari, an accused for the German Bakery blast was recruited by Iqbal Shabandari, while Iqbal was living in Mumbai. Iqbal made friends with him during a religious function while he was in Pune. Iqbal kept in touch with him constantly for the next three years. With the help of Mohsin and Iqbal's other associates, they were able to set up an Indian Mujahideen base in Pune. Iqbal Shabandari had started his career as a fervent proselytizer for the largely apolitical Tablighi Jamaat and later on became an Islamist ideologue who recruited several Pune men into the Indian Mujahideen. While the two Bhatkal brothers were living in a rented apartment in Khondwa, Pune they presided over terrorist networks that later carried out multiple bombings across the country.

In 2007, it is believed that he wrote the manifesto that was sent to the media before they carried out terrorist attacks in the Indian cities of Lucknow, Varanasi, and Faizabad. In 2008 Iqbal had composed the three e-mails were sent to media by hacking the Wi-Fi network in Mumbai. In all the cases above Iqbal is an absconding accused. The way the email was written reflects the influence of Pakistan's Army with references to Muhammad bin Qasim, Ghauri, and Ghazni.

Iqbal is currently based in Karachi, Pakistan along with his brother Riyaz Bhatkal, where they are said to have fled in the aftermath of the Batla House encounter in 2008, and operated in India with the help of Yasin Bhatkal. Yasin Bhatkal (unrelated) was caught in India and has been sentenced to death. Yasin Bhatkal was another main leader of the Indian Mujahideen. Iqbal and Riyaz are currently working on the "Karachi project" along with the Inter-Services Intelligence and the Lashkar-e-Taiba.

Iqbal Bhatkal's name was listed in the list of "50 most wanted criminals" sheltered in Pakistan. He was also the first leader of the Indian Mujahideen to have his name added to the list of the most wanted by the Indian government by the Central Bureau of Investigation. He is currently not believed to be actively involved in IM's operations and his brother is said to lead the group.
