= Indian Mujahideen =

Islamic fundamentalist group in South Asia

- Flag
- Founding leader: Amir Reza Khan; Iqbal Bhatkal; Riyaz Bhatkal; Yasin Bhatkal (−2013); Abdul Subhan Qureshi (−2018); Sadiq Israr Sheikh (−2008)
- Founded: 2003
- Dates active: 2005–
- Ideology: Islamic fundamentalism Pan-Islamism; Jihadism; Anti-Hindu sentiment
- Status: (India) Designated as terrorist organisation under the Unlawful Activities (Prevention) Act (4 June 2010) (New Zealand) Designated terrorist organisation under the Terrorism Suppression Act 2002 (22 October 2010) (United States) Designated Foreign Terrorist Organization (15 September 2011); Banned by the United Kingdom (United Arab Emirates) Designated as terrorist organisation (Canada) Designated as a terrorist organisation
- Part of: Students' Islamic Movement of India (allegedly)

Indian Mujahideen (IM) is an Islamic jihadist group which has been particularly active in India. The group was founded as an offshoot of the Students' Islamic Movement of India (SIMI) by several radicalised members including Iqbal Bhatkal, Riyaz Bhatkal, Yasin Bhatkal, Abdul Subhan Qureshi, Amir Reza Khan and Sadiq Israr Sheikh, among others. (Note: All three are from Bhatkal in the Karnataka state of India, hence their nickname "Bhatkal".) (Note: Amir Reza Khan is from Kolkata and carried out the 2002 attack on American cultural centre in Kolkata and the Khadim abduction.) It has been active since at least 2005 when it bombed the Dashashwamedh Ghat in Varanasi (where eight people were injured). It carried out several serial-bombings in Indian cities in the following years notably the 2007 Uttar Pradesh bombings, 2008 Jaipur bombings, 2008 Ahmedabad bombings, 2008 Delhi bombings, 2010 Pune bombing, 2011 Mumbai bombings, 2011 Delhi bombing, 2013 Patna bombings, (Note: The Patna bombings targeted a rally of the then Prime Ministerial candidate Narendra Modi.) 2013 Hyderabad blasts and the 2013 Bodh Gaya bombings.

Investigators believe that Indian Mujahideen is one of many groups composed of lower-tier SIMI members. According to the Indian Intelligence Bureau, SIMI took new titles because the top leadership of SIMI have been detained and would be available for interrogation. The change in names is believed to signal a change in tactics as SIMI-affiliated militants attempt to garner more support from India's Muslim community rather than be seen as a group consisting of foreigners. Two days after the 13 May 2008 Jaipur bombings, the extremist group sent an e-mail to Indian media in which they claimed responsibility for the attacks and said they would "demolish the faiths (all religions apart from Islam) of the infidels of India." The biggest and boldest attack to date by the group was the 2008 Ahmedabad serial blasts, where it gained national notoriety with a casualty of more than 50 people.

The group has been linked with the jihadist Lashkar-e-Taiba and its backer Pakistan's Inter-Services Intelligence. Harkat-ul-Jihad-al-Islami Bangladesh is also closely linked with the group and was instrumental in its founding.

Two of the founding leaders, Iqbal Bhatkal and Riyaz Bhatkal, shifted to Karachi in the aftermath of the Batla House encounter in 2008 and remain active from there, operating a faction of the group. Amir Reza Khan also fled to Karachi and is reported to run his own IM module from there. Yasin Bhatkal was apprehended in 2013 and was sentenced to death in 2016 for the 2013 Hyderabad blasts; Abdul Subhan Qureshi was similarly apprehended in 2018. With the capture of Yasin Bhatkal and Abdul Subhan Qureshi, along with the Batla House encounter in 2008, the group suffered a major setback.

After multiple Indian Mujahideen bomb blasts in different cities of India over the years, many of which were claimed by the group itself, it was declared a terrorist organisation on 4 June 2010 and banned by the Government of India. On 22 October 2010, New Zealand declared it a terrorist organisation. In September 2011, the United States officially placed the Indian Mujahideen on its list of foreign terrorist organisations, with the State Department acknowledging that the group had engaged in several terrorist attacks in India and had regional aspirations with the ultimate aim of creating an "Islamic caliphate" across South Asia. The group was banned by the United Kingdom as it aimed at creating an Islamic state and implementing sharia law in India, by use of indiscriminate violence.

== Background ==
The group was founded as the merger of Students' Islamic Movement of India's Usaba based in Bhatkal (where Iqbal Bhatkal, Riyaz Bhatkal and Yasin Bhatkal come from) and Asif Reza Commando Force which had been founded by Amir Reza Khan (in the name of his brother who had died in a shootout with the police) and had carried out the 2002 attack on American cultural centre in Kolkata. Most of its recruits are from SIMI of which the IM is largely an offshoot of. It was founded in 2003 and first became active in 2005, it adopted the name "Indian Mujahideen" in emails after the 2007 Uttar Pradesh bombings.

The Harkat-ul-Jihad-al-Islami Bangladesh also played an instrumental role in the founding of the group and had earlier been involved with the Asif Reza Commando Force. The Lashkar-e-Taiba also provided crucial support in IM's founding.

The Batla House encounter in 2008, when several IM members were arrested, first brought to light the leadership of the jihadist group.

Its signature weapons are timed improvised explosive devices (IEDs) made from ammonium nitrate, which it has used in most of its major attacks.

=== Factionalism ===
Riyaz Bhatkal and Amir Reza Khan both run their own factions of the group from Karachi, while Iqbal is not currently active in the group's operations.

Indian Mujahideen members are also known to have joined the Islamic State, as shown in one of their propaganda videos titled "The Bilad al-Hind [Land of India] – Between Pain and Hope". Shafi Armar and Sultan Armar, brothers and former IM members from Bhatkal, founded Islamic State affiliates Ansar-ut Tawhid fi Bilad al-Hind (transl. Supporters of Monotheism in the Land of India) and Janood-ul-Khalifa-e-Hind (transl. Caliph's Army of India) encouraging Indian Muslim recruitment for jihad in Syria and Afghanistan. The Armar brothers had split from Indian Mujahideen and formed these affiliates after a rift developed between them and Iqbal and Riyaz Bhatkal.

== Members ==
It is suspected that these are the major leaders of the Indian Mujahideen group.

=== Leaders ===
- Riyaz Bhatkal, co-founder, from Bhatkal; absconding in Karachi
- Iqbal Bhatkal, co-founder, from Bhatkal; absconding in Karachi
- Amir Reza Khan, co-founder; absconding in Karachi
- Yasin Bhatkal, co-founder; from Bhatkal, under arrest
- Abdul Subhan Qureshi alias Tauqeer, under arrest: co-founder, a software engineer from Mumbai; expert in bomb-making
- Sadiq Israr Sheikh, co-founder; engineering graduate from Azamgarh, under arrest, suspect in the 2006 Mumbai train bombings
- Mohsin Ismail Chaudhary, IED expert from Pune; absconding in Karachi
- Mirza Shadab Beg, IM operational planner; absconding in Pakistan
- Dr Shahnawaz, unani doctor; absconding in Afghanistan

=== Others ===
- Safdar Nagori, under arrest: architect of the transformation from SIMI to Indian Mujahideen
- Fayaz Kagzi, IED expert, joined the Lashkar-e-Taiba from SIMI, suicide-bomber in the 2016 Saudi Arabia bombings
- Zabiuddin Ansari, under arrest, joined the Lashkar-e-Taiba from IM, accused in the 2008 Mumbai attacks
- Shafi Armar, former IM member from Bhatkal, later ISIS operative, killed in Syria in 2015
- Sultan Armar, former IM member from Bhatkal, later ISIS operative, killed in Syria in 2015
- Muhammad "Bada" Sajid, IM member, joined ISIS, killed in Syria in 2015
- Abu Rashid Ahmed, IM member, joined ISIS
- Mufti Abu Bashir, under arrest: a preacher from Azamgarh in Uttar Pradesh
- Qayamuddin Kapadia, under arrest: a trader from Vadodara, started the first-ever mosque of the Ahle Hadis Tanzeem in Vadodara
- Sajid Mansuri, under arrest: a graduate in psychology and formerly a marketing executive
- Usman Agarbattiwala, wanted: a postgraduate diploma holder from Vadodara in human rights
- Alamzeb Afridi, wanted: a jobless youth from Ahmedabad; purchased bicycles and then planted them in Ahmedabad after tying bombs
- Abdul Razik Mansuri, wanted: an embroidery unit owner
- Mujib Shaikh, wanted: a stone polishing artisan
- Zahid Shaikh, wanted: a mobile phone repair shop owner from Ahmedabad
- Amil Parwaz, wanted: a native of Ujjain, believed to be involved in the court bomb blasts in Uttar Pradesh in November 2007

=== Delhi group ===
The local group at Delhi is thought to include the following, most of them from Azamgarh:

- Mohammad Atif Amin a.k.a. Bashir: Planner and recruiter, killed in the Batla House, Jamia Nagar encounter on 19 September. Planted a bomb at M-block market in Greater Kailash-I, Delhi in the 2008 Delhi bombings and Varanasi bombs in the 2006 Varanasi bombings.
- Mohammed "Chota" Sajid a.k.a. Pankaj: killed during the Batla House encounter. Planted a bomb at Barakhamba Road in Connaught Place.
- Mohammad Saif: arrested from Batla House in Jamia Nagar after the 19 September encounter. Planted a bomb at Regal Theatre, New Delhi in Connaught Place.
- Zeeshan: arrested after the Jamia Nagar encounter. Planted a bomb at Barakhamba Road in Connaught Place.
- Junaid: Escaped during the Batla House encounter. Planted a bomb at M-block market in Greater Kailash-I, and Varanasi bombs.
- Mohammad Shakeel: arrested on 21 September 2008 from Jamia Nagar. Planted a bomb at Nehru Place in south Delhi.
- Zia-ur-Rehman: arrested on 21 September 2008 from Jamia Nagar. Planted a bomb at Connaught Place and on a cycle in Ahmedabad in the 2008 Ahmedabad bombings.
- Saqib Nisar: arrested on 21 September 2008 from Jamia Nagar.
- Shahzad alias Pappu: arrested, from Azamgarh by UP STF. He escaped during the Jamia Nagar encounter. Planted a bomb in Central Park, Connaught Place.
- Alihas Malik: wanted. Planted a bomb at Central Park, Connaught Place.
- Mohammad Khalif: wanted.
- Salman: arrested by the Special Cell of the Delhi Police.

== Attacks ==
The group has carried out several serial bombings in Indian cities. There were emails sent by the Indian Mujahideen that claimed that they were responsible for some of the following terror incidents. One warning email was received 5 minutes before the first blast in Ahmedabad. Another was received soon after the first blast of Delhi bombings. The timing makes it impossible for any other groups to have sent the two emails. The following are attacks where it has claimed responsibility or is suspected of involvement:

- 2005 Delhi bombings
- 2006 Mumbai train bombings
- 2006 Varanasi bombings
- August 2007 Hyderabad bombings
- 2007 Uttar Pradesh bombings
- 2008 Jaipur bombings
- 2008 Delhi bombings
- 2008 Bangalore serial blasts
- 2008 Ahmedabad serial blasts
- 2010 Bangalore stadium bombing
- 2010 Pune bombing
- 2010 Jama Masjid attack
- 2010 Varanasi bombing
- 2011 Delhi bombing
- 2012 Pune bombings
- 2011 Mumbai serial blasts
- 2013 Bodh Gaya blasts
- 2013 Bangalore bombing
- 2013 Patna bombings
- 2013 Hyderabad blasts
- 2014 Burdwan blast
- 2014 Chennai train bombing
- 2018 Bodh Gaya blasts

== Suspects and arrests ==
Mufti Abu Bashir Ishlahi alias Abdul Wasir was arrested with the help of Uttar Pradesh police at his father's home at Sarai Mir in Azamgarh, Uttar Pradesh on 14 August 2008. Bashir studied in the local Madarsatul Islah and later in Deoband. According to the reports, Bashir claimed that the 2008 Ahmedabad bombings cost Rs 75,000. A SIMI activist sold his house in Kutch to get the amount. Bashir, who had stayed in Ahmedabad along with Abdul Subhan Qureshi alias Tauqeer, a co-conspirator, had bought five SIM cards using local names and addresses. He had used these cell phone numbers to remain in touch with the other members of the module at the planning stage of the conspiracy. Bashir had given the SIM cards to the bomb planters on 26 July, who had used them carefully. Each member had contacted the others through STD-PCO booths after successfully planting the bombs. These numbers were used only for receiving calls. Many of the calls were from Juhapura, where Zahid Shaikh, one of the key members of the group, lived at Sandhi Avenue near the Sarkhej highway. These numbers had become inactive immediately after the blasts.

In March 2014, the Special Cell of the Delhi Police arrested four members of IM, out of which one was Waqas alias Javed, a bomb-making expert in the group. They were arrested in Jaipur and Jodhpur in Rajasthan.

On 28 August 2013, in a major breakthrough, Yasin Bhatkal, co-founder of IM, and another IM terrorist were arrested by Indian Police and NIA near the India–Nepal border. According to Gujarat police, the breakthrough in the 2008 Ahmedabad serial blasts case came from five 'switched-off' mobile phone numbers. Joint Commissioner of Police (crime) Ashish Bhatia said that the terrorists had procured five SIM cards of phones that were switched off on the day of the blasts – 26 July. The analysis of the phone calls made to those SIM cards from PCOs provided them the key leads.

Ejaz Sheikh, wanted in several cases including the 2010 Jama Masjid attack, was arrested on 6 September 2014 from the Saharanpur area of western Uttar Pradesh by the Special Cell of the Delhi Police. He is considered a "technical expert" and considered a key member of IM.

== Batla House encounter ==
On 19 September 2008, the police raided an apartment in Jamia Nagar, near Jamia Millia Islamia In Delhi. There is speculation that the prime suspect in the 2008 Ahmedabad bombings, Mufti, a madrasa teacher from Azamgarh, may have pointed out the apartment.

The raid resulted in the death of terrorists Bashir alias Mohammed Atif Amin (son of Mohammed Amin, cloth merchant in Bhiwandi, Mumbai) and Mohammad Sajid, and a decorated police officer, Mohan Chand Sharma, in the gunfight. Mohammad Saif (the son of Samajwadi Party leader Shadab Ahmed) was arrested while two hostiles managed to flee by possibly jumping the rooftops. All of the suspects were from the town of Sarai Mir in Azamgarh district. They claimed to be students of Jamia Milia Islamia, but that was denied by the university.

The five were responsible for manufacturing bombs used in the Ahmedabad, Jaipur and Delhi blasts.

Atif claimed to have been studying for a diploma in human resources development from Jamia Milia Islamia University. However, Jamia Milia denied having him as a student. Some residents of Sarai Mir thought he was pursuing his bachelor's degree in technology from Jamia Hamdard.

Atif was said to have been the leader of a group of 14 young men from Azamgarh in Uttar Pradesh, all claiming to have been studying in Delhi: Atif, Sajid alias Pankaj (both now dead), Shehzad alias Pappu, Junaid, Shahdab Bhai alias Mallick, Sajid, Mohammad Khalid, Arif, Shakil, Zia Khan and Salman, Zeeshan and Mohammad Saif.

Zeeshan Jawed was arrested from the offices of a private TV station. He worked for a private company, Monarch International on Vikas Marg, and is also said to be studying management. Both he and Saif claim to have been recruited by Atif.

It is reported that Mohammad Saif has said that the plans to carry out several blasts across the country were mooted about three years ago when the Indian Mujahideen was formed. Although the blasts spanned a period of 10 months (the first blasts took place in August 2007 in Hyderabad), the planning was made far back in 2005. After that a series of explosions occurred in Uttar Pradesh, Jaipur, Ahmedabad and Delhi.

There is considerable resentment in Sarai Mir over the death of the local boys. Villagers have blamed the media for giving a bad name to Azamgarh by calling it a "nursery of terror". Mafia don Abu Salem hails from here. Azamgarh used to export its famous country-made pistols, known as "kattas", whose factories dot the region. The district was also known for young sharpshooters who joined Mumbai gangs. Individuals from the area have been accused of the murders of Bollywood producer Gulshan Kumar in Mumbai and Left leader Shankar Guha Niyogi in Chhattisgarh.

== See also ==
- Harkat-ul-Jihad al-Islami
- Inter-Services Intelligence activities in India
- Lashkar-e-Taiba
- Pakistan and state-sponsored terrorism
- Popular Front of India
- Abdul Subhan Qureshi
- Students Islamic Movement of India (SIMI)
  - Karnataka Forum for Dignity, SIMI offshoot
