= 2010 Varanasi bombing =

Terrorist bombing attack in Varanasi, India

- Location: Varanasi, India
- Date: 7 December 2010; 18:20 IST (UTC+05:30)
- Target: Sheetla Ghat
- Attack type: Bombing
- Deaths: 2
- Injuries: 38
- Perpetrator: Indian Mujahideen

The 2010 Varanasi bombing was a blast that occurred on 7 December 2010, in one of the holiest Hindu cities, Varanasi. The explosion occurred at Sheetla Ghat, adjacent to the main Dashashwamedh Ghat, where the sunset aarti, the evening prayer ritual to the holy river, Ganges had commenced, on these stone steps leading to it, where thousands of worshipers and tourists had gathered. It killed two people including a two-year-old girl who was sitting on her mother's lap. The mother was one of three critically injured out of the 38 injured. In the ensuing panic after the blast, a railing broke causing a stampede leading to an increase in the number of injuries. The bomb was hidden inside a milk container on the Sheetla Ghat. The blast occurred a day after the anniversary of the 1992 Babri Masjid demolition, in which a mosque was demolished at Ayodhya leading to nationwide religious riots killing over 2,000 people. Subsequently, the Islamist militant group, Indian Mujahideen, claimed responsibility of the blast, via email to Indian media. This was the second terrorism-related incident in the city which was rocked by the serial blasts of 2006, in which 28 people were killed, it included an explosion at the Sankatmochan Temple, some two kilometres away.

Sitala Ghat is the southern extension of the Dashashwamedh Ghat, and its stone steps lead to Sitala Mata Temple. Also close by is the historic Kashi Vishwanath Temple, the Shiva temple which has one of the 12 Jyotirlinga of India. The present ghat was re-furbished in c. 1740 by Pt. Narayana Diksit the preceptor of Peshwa Baji Rao I, the Prime Minister of the Maratha Empire.

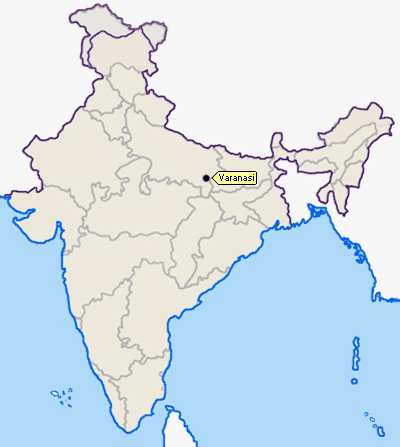
Location of Varanasi in India

== Aftermath ==
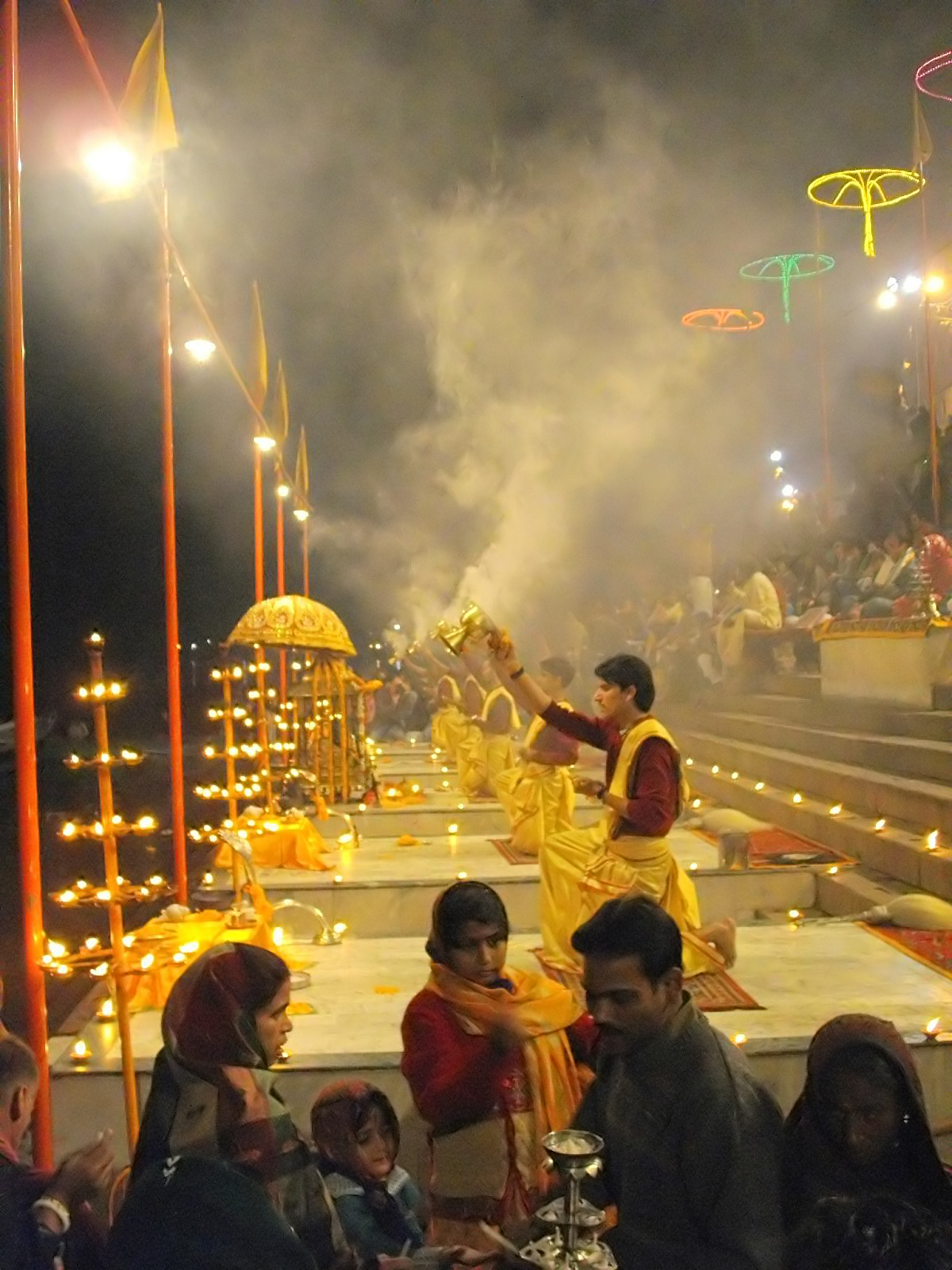
Evening Ganga Aarti at the adjacent Dashashwamedh Ghat, Varanasi in 2008, with people watching from the steps above.

After the incident 20 injured were admitted to BHU Hospital, 13 in Kabir Chaura Hospital, while 4 were sent to Heritage Hospital in the city. Six foreigners tourist were also injured including an Italian, Alessandro Mantelli, who was later said to be out of danger, French national Rachael, Ki Taro from Japan, South Korean Wan Sen Kim, Italian Livio DiMajo and a German citizen, Ozel. The death of the Italian tourist was wrongly reported in some media agencies, while he was recuperating in a city hospital.

The responsibility for the attack was claimed by the Pakistan-based Islamist militant group, Indian Mujahideen, via email. In an email, dated 6 December, which was traced to WiFi connections in the Vashi suburb in Navi Mumbai by the Mumbai Police, the Indian Mujahideen claimed that had carried out the blast as a revenge for the supposedly "biased" Babri Masjid verdict of 30 September 2010.

The bomb blast occurred at one of the steps of the Sitala ghat leading to the famous Sheetla Devi temple, which was surrounded by devotees and foreign tourists. After the incident the Chief Minister of Uttar Pradesh Mayawati and Union Minister of Home Affairs P. Chidambaram visited the site, and appealed for peace. A national security alert was sounded and police intensified patrols in major cities like New Delhi, Mumbai, and Bangalore. Elsewhere in Hyderabad and Cyberabad the intelligence alerted local police on possible attacks on Dutch nationals in the city, after intercepting SMSs opposing the anti-Islam Dutch film Fitna (Devilry) by Dutch politician Geert Wilders.

On 11 December, a 50-year-old woman, visiting the town to watch the Ganga Aarti on the Dasashwamedh Ghat, succumbed to her injuries at a local hospital.

== Investigations ==
The following day, Mumbai Police investigations showed that Pakistan-based Bhatkal brothers, Riyaz and Iqbal, the chiefs of the Indian Mujahideen (IM) being the brains behind the explosion, which was carried out by Dr Shahnawaz presently based both in Dubai and Pakistan. He is the brother of IM foot soldier Mohammed Saif, who was arrested in the Batla House encounter on 19 September 2008 in which IM commander Atiq Amin was killed, while Dr Shahnawaz along with Khalid, Abu Rashid and Bada Sajid or Mohammed Sajid had fled to Nepal and now hold Nepalese passports.

On 8 December, three people, two identified as Shahnawaz and Assadullah, were arrested by the Uttar Pradesh state Anti-Terror Squad (ATS) and are linked to the Delhi serial blasts as well as the Batla House encounter, both in 2008. The arrests suggested the revival of the Indian Mujahiddin terror outfit, which was dormant after the last encounter in 2008, a fact that is worrisome both for the state as well as the central government. The group however was previously suspected to be involved in the September 2010 Jama Masjid attack, in which two tourists were wounded in a machine gun attack, just before the 2010 Commonwealth Games in Delhi.

In the subsequent investigations at the site, which was cordoned off soon after the incident and screened by the investigating agencies, improvised explosive device (IED) was recovered from a metal dustbin, though no residue of the explosives, remains of any circuit or detonator were found, the device did not have shrapnel in it, thus there were no burn or shrapnel injuries, and all the injured were hit by pieces of wall that broke following the explosion, all suggesting the use of plastique explosive, PETN, TNT or C4. Early results revealed used of Semtex, a general-purpose plastic explosive containing RDX and pentaerythritol tetranitrate (PETN); however, the final report of the Forensic Science Institute, Gujarat is awaited.

A writer for The Diplomat suggested that the blast not having occurred on the anniversary of Babri Mosque destruction on 6 December, and the shoddy design of the attack, were indicative of the weakening of the Indian Mujahideen due to police action.
