= 2011 Delhi bombing =

Terrorist attack in India

- Location of the 2011 Delhi bombing
- Location: 28.6090°N 77.2362°E; Sher Shah Road, New Delhi, India
- Date: 7 September 2011; 10:14 IST (UTC+05:30)
- Attack type: Bombings
- Weapons: Improvised explosive devices made with Ammonium nitrate, PETN
- Deaths: 15
- Injuries: 79
- Perpetrators: Harkat-ul-Jihad-al-Islami; Indian Mujahideen
- Motive: Commuting death sentence of Afzal Guru

The 2011 Delhi bombing took place in the Indian capital New Delhi on Wednesday, 7 September 2011 at 10:14 local time outside Gate No. 5 of the Delhi High Court, where a suspected briefcase bomb was planted. The blast killed 15 people and injured 79. Harkat-ul-Jihad al-Islami claimed responsibility for the attack, and is believed to have carried out the attack with support from the Indian Mujahideen, it stated motive was the commuting of the death sentence for 2001 Indian Parliament attack convict Afzal Guru.

== Background ==
Previously, a low-intensity blast also occurred at the High Court outside Gate No. 7 on 25 May with no reported casualties.

The attack took place while Indian Prime Minister Manmohan Singh was on a historic two-day official state visit to Bangladesh, to discuss Bangladesh–India relations. The attack also happened less than two months after bombings in Mumbai on 13 July which killed 26 people.

== Attack ==
The blast took place at 10:14 IST on 7 September 2011. Explosives were placed in a briefcase at the high court reception where hundreds of people throng every day to attend court cases, Home Secretary R.K. Singh said to reporters. According to the special secretary in the Home Ministry, two kilos of explosives were used, with ammonium nitrate and PETN to cause considerable damage even though used in a small amount.

== Responsibility ==
According to reports immediately following the blasts, responsibility for the bombings was claimed by the Harkat-ul-Jihad al-Islami (HuJI) group. In an email attributed to HuJI, the group is alleged to have demanded that Mohammed Afzal Guru, convicted for the 2001 Indian Parliament attack, should not be hanged as ordered by the Supreme Court. However, Afzal Guru strongly denied any such link to the attack, and said that his name was being "unnecessarily" dragged into the "cowardly act" which "must be condemned by all".

A day after this email, another email was sent by the Indian Mujahideen to television media, allegedly claiming that the attack was carried out by IM and not HuJI and also threatened it would carry out more attacks on shopping complexes on the coming Tuesday.

On 10 September, the Indian Union Home Secretary stated that it was not necessary that the emails claiming responsibility for the Delhi High Court blast were sent by the actual perpetrators and added that it could have been other people who, when they heard about the blast, sent the emails.

== Investigations ==
A sketch of two suspected persons was released by the Delhi Police Department on the day of the bombing. According to police sources, the sketches were based on the description given by an eyewitness. The sketch showed one person in his 50s, and another in his mid-20s.

The National Investigation Agency (NIA) took over the investigations, and set up a 20-member team to examine the email. The Central Forensic Science Laboratory is examining the composition of the explosives and it is expected to release the results in the next few days, on which NIA will act accordingly. The email sent by HuJI was traced to have been sent from a cyber cafe named Global Internet Cafe located at Malik Market in Kishtwar, Jammu and Kashmir. The NIA team in Jammu and Kashmir detained three suspects including the cyber cafe owner and his brother for questioning. However, the Director-General of the NIA, said that it was too premature to comment on the HuJI mail but (they) were looking at it seriously because HuJI was a prominent group which considered India its primary target. A NIA team arrested a man from Patna due to his alleged involvement in misusing a stolen ATM card and was cross-examined by the NIA team. Another email sent in the name of Indian Mujahideen was traced to a Monu Ojha, a 22-year-old school dropout in Ahmedabad, who confessed to deliberately creating a hoax email.

A separate investigation was set up by the Delhi Police Department after the Intelligence Bureau said that only one input was received, which specifically cited Muslim extremists who are supporters of the Khalistan movement and may conduct illegal activities in the city.

On 7 October, the National Investigation Agency arrested a medical student from Kishtwar, Jammu and Kashmir named Wasim Akram Malik, who they claimed was a key conspirator of the blast. Kashmiri Wasim Akram Malik, a student of Unani medicine in Bangladesh, was arrested from the Indo-Bangladesh border, on basis of leads derived from other detained suspects. The NIA team had zoomed in on Kishtwar after receiving emails from a cyber cafe in the area. The NIA claimed that the arrested have strong links to the terrorist group Harkat-ul-Jihad-al-Islami. Public Relation Officer (PRO) Defence, Col R K Palta claimed killing of two terrorists on 6 August 2012 in the Trothil forest area of the Kishtwar district. These have been identified as Amir Ali and Mohmmad Shafi alias Sakib. Deputy Inspector General (DIG), Kishtwar-Doda-Ramban range claimed that Amir Ali is the prime accused in the Delhi High Court blast.

== Court trial ==
"Wasim Malik, an avid internet user, is one of those leaderless jehadis who conspired with the terrorists of the Hizbul Mujahideen and other outfits and executed this cowardly and inhuman terrorist action"

— National Investigation Agency

In March 2012, the NIA filed a charge sheet against six accused, including a minor. The accused named in the charge sheet are: Wasim Akram Malik, Malik's brother Junaid Akram Malik, Amir Abbas Dev, Shakir Hussain Seikh alias Chota Hafiz and Amir Kamal. Out of them, Amir Dev turned approver and was granted pardon by court. Junaid, Shakir, Amir are still absconding.

On 4 September 2012, a special NIA court in New Delhi found sufficient prima facie evidence against Malik under Indian Penal Code provisions dealing with criminal conspiracy, murder and attempt to murder and various terror charges. However, the court dropped the charges dealing with waging war against the nation and conspiracy and collecting arms to wage a war against the nation. The court fixed 1 October for framing of charges.

== Reactions ==
=== Domestic ===
President Pratibha Patil condemned the blast and condoled the loss of lives in the incident. Prime Minister Manmohan Singh, while on a two-day stay in Dhaka, remarked: "I just heard the sad news from Delhi about the bomb blast. I am told that 10 people have been killed. This is cowardly act of terrorist nature. We will deal with it. We will never succumb to the pressure of terrorism." Indian Home Minister P. Chidambaram said the blast was likely a job of local militants and remarked that "India was concerned about how to prevent the radicalisation of its youth."

Indian Muslim religious leaders termed the blast as an act against humanity and suspected that it could be a deep conspiracy to destabilize the secular system of India. They appealed to the members of Muslim community to oppose such acts with loud voice and extend all possible support to the government in tackling the crisis.

As attack coincided with Manmohan Singh's visit to Bangladesh, and also because of the 13 July 2011 Mumbai bombings coincided with meetings between the foreign ministers of India and Pakistan, some analysts suggested the attack was an attempt to divert attention from the agreements reached between Bangladesh and India.

=== International ===
- United Nations - Secretary-General of the United Nations Ban Ki-moon strongly condemned the terror attack in Delhi.
- Australia - Prime Minister Julia Gillard said that: "The government and people of Australia unreservedly condemn the bombing. Our thoughts are with the families of the innocent people who have been killed and with those injured by the blast." The shadow foreign minister Julie Bishop called the attack a blow to Indian society.
- Bangladesh - Prime Minister Sheikh Hasina's office released a statement reading that she "conveyed [her] heartfelt sympathies and profound condolences to the members of the bereaved families. She also offered prayers for the "eternal peace of those who have passed away, and for the people of India to bear this shock with fortitude."
- Brazil - The embassy issued a statement reading: "The Brazilian Government expresses its solidarity to the Government of the Republic of India and to the relatives of the victims...The Brazilian Government reaffirms its repulse to all forms of violence, carried out under whatever pretext."
- Japan - Foreign Minister Kōichirō Genba said that: "Terrorism in all its forms and manifestations cannot be justified. Japan firmly condemns these atrocious acts of terrorism that victimise so many innocent people."
- Pakistan - A statement released by the Ministry of Foreign Affairs, and attributed to President Asif Ali Zardari and Prime Minister Yousaf Raza Gillani, condemned the attack and expressed sympathy for the victims: "The Pakistani leadership has expressed their deepest sympathies to the families of the victims of the bombing, to the government and people of India. They have expressed the hope that the perpetrators of this heinous act will be brought to justice."
- United Kingdom - Foreign Secretary William Hague condemned the bombing and said that: "I was appalled to hear of the bomb blast outside the High Court in Delhi today. I condemn this cowardly attack and send my deepest condolences to those who have lost loved ones or who have been injured."
- United States - Chargé d'affaires Peter Burleigh condemned the bombing and said: "On behalf of all Americans, I extend deep condolences to the Government of India and the families of those harmed in this morning’s attack on the New Delhi High Court. Terrorism is a crime that affects us all. Bombings like today’s demonstrate that our shared struggle continues against those who would commit such atrocities."
- Vietnam - The Spokesperson of the Ministry of Foreign Affairs of Vietnam, Ms. Nguyen Phuong Nga said:"Vietnam strongly condemns recent consecutive terrorist attacks in India. We believe that the culprits who launched this terror attack will be severely punished.We would like to send our condolences to the government, people and families of victims of these terrorist attacks."

== See also ==
- 2011 Agra bombing
- 2011 Mumbai bombings
