= 2014 Burdwan blast =

Terrorist attack in India

- Location of West Bengal in India
- Location: Burdwan, West Bengal, India
- Date: 2 October 2014
- Weapons: Improvised explosive devices, RDX
- Deaths: 2
- Injuries: 1
- Perpetrator: Jamaat-ul-Mujahideen Bangladesh
- Charges: Indian Penal Code, Unlawful Activities (Prevention) Act, Arms Act, 1959, The Foreigners Act, 1946
- Verdict: Life sentence
- Convicted: 21

On 2 October 2014, an explosion occurred in a house in the Khagragarh locality of Burdwan. Two terrorists (initially suspected to be from the Indian Mujahideen) were killed and a third injured. The police seized 55 improvised explosive devices, RDX, wrist watch dials and SIM cards.

In August 2019, 19 people including 4 Bangladeshi citizens, members of the Jamaat-ul-Mujahideen Bangladesh (JMB), were convicted of carrying out the attacks by a National Investigation Agency special court. In February 2021, Kausar from Mymensingh in Bangladesh, a member of the JMB was convicted and sentenced to 29-years in jail by an NIA court under sections of the Indian Penal Code, the Unlawful Activities (Prevention) Act, the Arms Act and the Foreigners Act. He is also accused of being involved in the 2013 Bodh Gaya bombings. In June 2022, Mohd Mosiuddin also from the JMB, was convicted for his involvement in the attacks and given a life-sentence. He was also convicted of plotting to behead foreign tourists in Kolkata by a sessions court, and is suspected of being an Islamic State member and had a history of other violent offences including throwing a shoe at the judge during a previous hearing.

== Blast ==
On 2 October 2014 at 12:00 noon, an explosion occurred in a two-storeyed building in the Khagragarh locality of Burdwan. The building was owned by Nurul Hasan Chowdhury who used to stay in another house across the road. Hasan Chowdhury was a leader of the Trinamool Congress and the ground floor of the building was used as Trinamool Congress party office. During the 2008 and 2013 Panchayat elections, it was used as the election office by the Trinamool Congress. Chowdhury had rented the first floor of the building to one Shakil Ahmed for a monthly rent of ₹4,700.

Locals informed the police and the fire brigade when they heard the sound of explosion and saw smoke billowing out of the first floor room. When the police arrived, two women inside the building prevented the police from entering at gunpoint, threatening to blow up the building and destroyed several documents and evidences.

Shakil Ahmed who had rented the place and hailed from Karimpur in Nadia district, died on the spot. Two persons were injured. One of them Sobhan Mondal died later at the Burdwan Medical College and Hospital. The other named Abdul Hakim, from Lalgola in Murshidabad district, was admitted to the hospital in the critical condition. The two women, wives of Shakil Ahmed and Abdul Hakim and their two children were left unharmed.

The police arrested the two women. More than 50 improvised explosive devices were recovered. The police also seized large numbers of wrist watch dials, SIM cards and tools used to prepare improvised explosive devices. Micro SD cards containing propaganda songs, Taliban training videos were recovered. Fake Indian documents like elector's card and passport were found. Maps and half burnt books in Arabic too were recovered. The CID detonated the improvised explosive devices on the banks of Damodar.

== Investigation ==
A National Investigation Agency team reached Burdwan on 3 October for investigation. Preliminary investigations by the CID hint towards a group named 'Al Jihad' being involved in the activities. According to the NIA, the Al Jihad module had planned a series of ten blasts in Kolkata during the Durga Puja. A team from Central Forensic Research Laboratory reached the spot on 4 October. They inspected the sand from the detonation site and suspected that the operatives belonged to Indian Mujahideen.

== See also ==
- Raktabeej, 2023 Indian film based on the terrorist attack
