= 2013 Bodh Gaya bombings =

Set of terrorist bombings in India

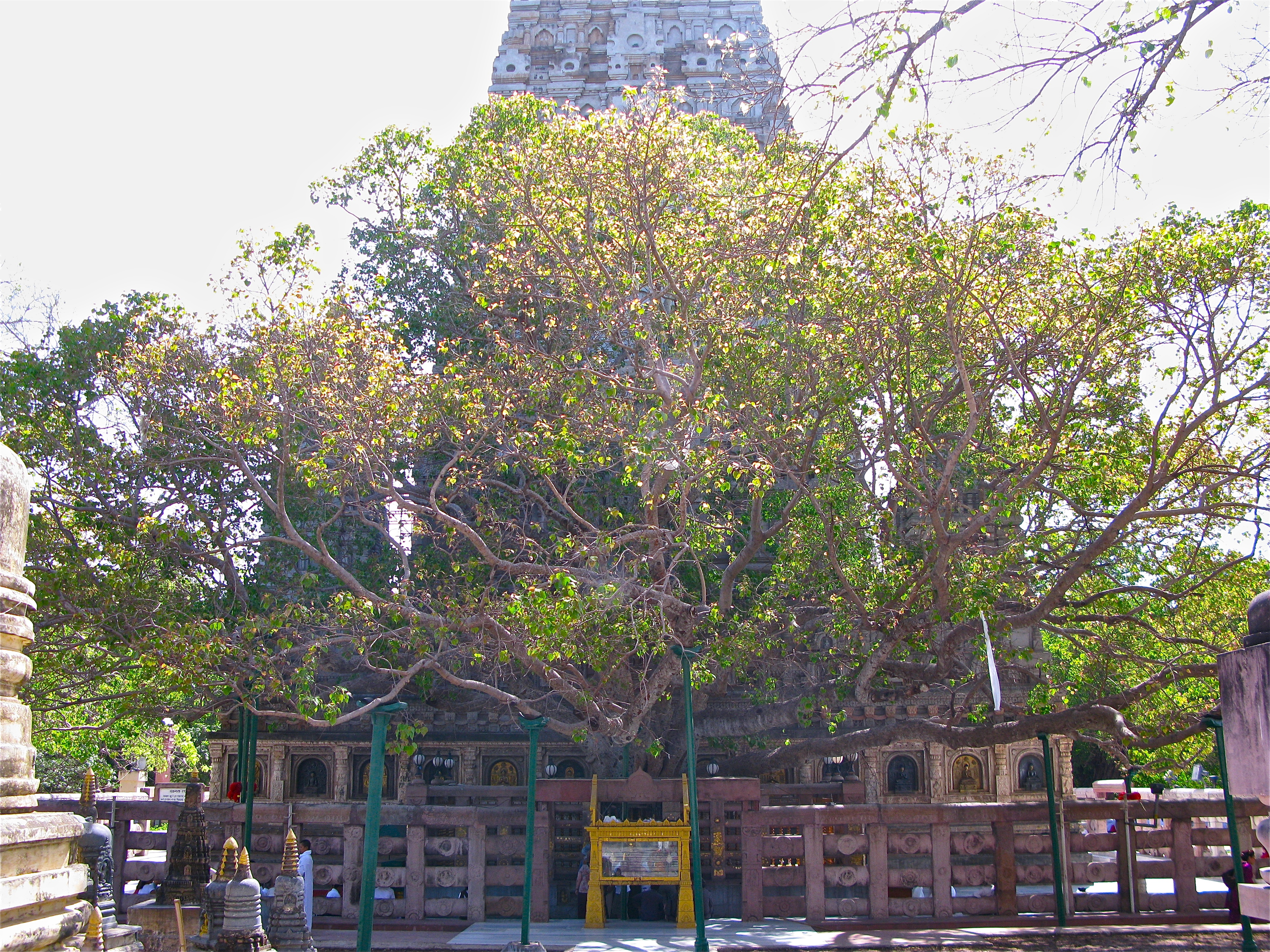
- Bodhi Tree near the Mahabodhi Temple.

- Location of Bodh Gaya in Bihar.
- Location: Mahabodhi Temple, Bodh Gaya
- Date: 7 July 2013; 05:30–06:00 (IST)
- Attack type: Bombing
- Weapons: Improvised explosive device and cylinder bombs
- Injuries: 5
- Perpetrator: Indian Mujahideen
- Motive: Avenge the Rohingya genocide in Myanmar
- Charges: Unlawful Activities (Prevention) Act, Explosives Act
- Verdict: Life Imprisonment and fine
- Convictions: Criminal conspiracy, promoting enmity among different groups on grounds of religion, sect and place of birth
- Convicted: Umer Siddiqui; Azaharuddin Qureshi; Imtiyaz Ansari alias Alam; Haider Ali alias Black Beauty; Mujibullah Ansari

On 7 July 2013 a series of ten bombs exploded in and around the Mahabodhi Temple complex, a UNESCO World Heritage Site in Bodh Gaya, India. Five people, including two Buddhist monks, were injured by the blasts. Three other devices were defused by bomb-disposal squads at a number of locations in Gaya.

The temple itself and the Bodhi Tree (where Gautama Buddha had attained enlightenment) were undamaged. However, the Archaeological Survey of India confirmed damage to new structures in the temple complex. International figures, including the Dalai Lama, Sri Lankan President Mahinda Rajapaksa and Myanmar Opposition leader Aung San Suu Kyi, condemned the attacks. On 4 November 2013, the National Investigation Agency announced that the Islamic terrorist group Indian Mujahideen was responsible for the bombings.

A National Investigation Agency (NIA) special court found all five of the accused Indian Mujahideen terrorists, Imtiyaz Ansari, Mujib Ullah, Omair Siddiqui and Azharuddin Qureishi, guilty of carrying out the attacks and sentenced them to life imprisonment under the Unlawful Activities (Prevention) Act and Explosives Act. Another minor was sentenced for three years at a remand home by a juvenile court in 2017.

Another IED bombing was carried out on 19 January 2018 at the Mahabodhi Temple when the Dalai Lama along with several Buddhist pilgrims was camping in the town to participate in the month-long Kalachakra prayer; no one was apparently hurt in the attack. For the 2018 bombings on 1 June 2018, a special NIA court of Patna sentenced to 3 of the 8 accused to life imprisonment and the other 5 to ten years in prison. All of them were members of the Jamaat-ul-Mujahideen Bangladesh.

In both the 2013 and 2018 bombings the terrorists stated their motive was targeting Buddhist sites to avenge the Rohingya genocide in neighbouring Myanmar, a Buddhist majority country.

== Bombings ==
The Mahabodhi Mahavihara is an important temple for Buddhists worldwide. The bombs exploded between 05:30 and 06:00 IST (00:30–01:00 UTC), concurrently with the Sutta chanting and meditation which begin the daily routine of the mahavihara.

Four of the blasts occurred within the Mahabodhi Temple complex:

- The first bomb exploded at 5:30 IST, during prayers in the temple sanctuary.
- About two minutes later a bomb exploded on the east side of the complex, at the Animesh Lochna Temple. Wooden bookshelves, stacked with Buddhist scriptures, were damaged by this blast.
- A third bomb exploded on the south side of the complex, at the Butter Lamp House. This blast damaged the Bodhgaya Temple Management Committee (BTMC) ambulance parked there.
- A fourth bomb exploded on the north side of the complex, inside a small shrine; however, an image of the Buddha in the shrine was unaffected by the blast.

Five other blasts occurred in Bodh Gaya, within a 500-metre radius of the Mahabodhi Temple complex:

- A small bomb exploded at an 80-foot (24 m) statue of the Buddha.
- Three bombs exploded at the Tergar (Tibetan) Monastery. One bomb was placed behind the door of a classroom where children study Buddhism. The windows and classroom doors were damaged; there were no injuries, since the children were on holiday.
- One bomb exploded on a bus parked at the Sujata bypass.

Indian Home Minister Sushilkumar Shinde said on 8 July that there were ten blasts, not nine as earlier reported; it was unclear where the tenth bomb detonated. Despite the blasts, BTMC monks opened the main sanctuary of the temple for routine prayer and rituals.

Bomb-disposal squads defused three more bombs, which did not explode because the analog timers in them failed. A cylinder bomb at the Tergar monastery, another bomb near the 80-foot statue of the Buddha, and a third bomb was found during the afternoon, near the Royal Residence Hotel in the village of Baiju Bigaha. The bomb-detection team separated the detonator from the power source to defuse these bombs:

Three pamphlets, handwritten in Urdu, were reportedly found with the defused bombs. Code words in two of the pamphlets seemed to describe the locations where the bombs would be planted, while the third pamphlet included the phrase "Revenge for Iraq".

== Investigation ==
On 8 July the city SP of Gaya Chandan Kushwaha and District Development Officer Giridhar Dayal released CCTV footage of the blast sites at the Mahabodhi Temple and, based on an analysis of the footage, sketches of the suspected attackers. Sahidur and Saifur Rehman, brothers from Scotland and Saudi Arabia respectively, were identified from the sketches; both are alleged Indian Mujahideen (IM) operatives. Another man, Vinod Mistri, was also arrested since his identity card was found at the blast site. However, Mistri claimed to have lost his card days before the blasts. National Investigation Agency (NIA) released Mistri on 10 July for lack of evidence after taking his statement. An alleged IM tweet claimed responsibility for the Bodh Gaya bombings on the day of the blasts, warning that Mumbai would be the next target. The IP address was traced to Pakistan, and NIA investigated the claim.

On 16 July, NIA released the sketches and a video clip of a suspect in the bombings. According to the agency, the suspect (in Bhikkhu clothing) planted four bombs in the Mahabodhi complex. Witnesses noticed that the suspect performed Parikrama incorrectly. NIA reported that the suspected bomber intended to blow up the main statue of the Buddha, but did not enter the sanctuary because prayers had already begun.

Investigators discovered that the 13 Lotus timers used in the bombings were bought at a shop in Guwahati. They also ascertained that the clocks attached to the unexploded bombs were manufactured at a factory in Rajkot, Gujarat. The cylinders attached to the bombs were obtained in Bihar, so NIA suspected local involvement.

Investigators also confirmed that the bombs used in Patna and Bodh Gaya were nearly identical; one of the many similarities investigated was in the way the bombs were planted. On 4 November 2013 NIA raided a lodge in Ranchi, finding evidence of a plot to bomb pilgrimage sites. The evidence included a map of planned bombings and the coded names of the terrorists. An NIA agent confirmed that "the charts they recovered matched precisely".

The evidence confirmed that the Ranchi cell of the IM was responsible for the blasts. According to reports, Imtiaz Ansari placed a bomb near the Thai Monastery and Ainul (a.k.a. Tariq) placed one at the Tergar Monastery. Mujib placed bombs at four locations in Bodh Gaya. The six-person attacking squad allegedly worked in pairs, and was assigned to place three bombs each. NIA named the five bomb planters, who planned the attack over a year ago: Hyder Ali, Imtiaz Ansari, Tariq (a.k.a. Ainul) and Taufeeq and Mujibal Ansari. The agency suspects that Ali masterminded the plot with guidance from Tehseen Akhtar, a Ranchi-based IM operative. Investigators suspect that Riyaz Bhatkal, a Pakistani IM leader, commanded the attack.

=== Alleged warnings ===
Some members of the media blamed the Bihar Police, saying the blasts resulted from a lack of security at the management and operational levels. The metal detectors at the Mahabodhi Temple were not calibrated to detect bombs, and there were only four guards on duty when the blasts occurred. A security expert said, "The decision to let the Bodh Gaya Management Committee man security inside the premises is preposterous and immature". Questioned by NIA in the US in June 2010 about the 2008 Mumbai attacks, David Headley claimed that Lashkar-e-Taiba prepared a video on the Mahabodhi Temple and was planning to trigger blasts there. The IM, responsible for the 2012 Pune bombings, revealed plans to attack the Mahabodhi Temple in Bodh Gaya in October 2012. In April 2013 the NIA issued a list of alleged IM operatives, including Gaya-born Amir Reza Khan (alias Parvez, alias Rizwan, alias Muttaki), a resident of the village of Maheyan in Mohanpur, Gaya who was the sixth wanted member of the list.

Reza, perpetrator of the Bangalore and Pune blasts, is suspected to have provided reconnaissance on the Mahabodhi Temple site. The Intelligence Bureau (IB) issued several warnings, one in 2012 and two in 2013. The Bihar Police were alerted in June 2013 about the targets by the IB, and on 2 July the IB alerted them about the entry of two suspects into Gaya. The Ministry of Home Affairs warned on 3 July that the temple was a target. The warnings caused a Bihar Police meeting the same day about security at the Mahabodhi Temple, but the blasts occurred within 100 hours. The treasurer of All India Bhiku Sangha, Pragya Deep, said: "The administration had prior information. There was a report of the IB. A series of security review meetings have been conducted. There have been at least five to six meetings. It’s shameful that despite this, the blasts have taken place. This is a mistake on the part of the administration". After the blast, Chief Minister of Bihar Nitish Kumar said: "The government had always been on the alert and taken steps to ensure the security of the Mahabodhi temple and Bodh Gaya in general". A senior official of the IB said, "The Bodh Gaya temple was a long standing target and we had been reminding the Bihar state agencies about it. But our warnings were not taken seriously".

== Reactions ==
Indian President Pranab Mukherjee called the blasts a "senseless act of violence targeting innocent pilgrims and monks who had gathered to worship at this temple dedicated to the great apostle of peace—Gautama Buddha". Prime Minister of India Manmohan Singh condemned the incident, saying that India's "composite culture and traditions teach us respect for all religions and such attacks on religious places will never be tolerated". A national organisation of Buddhist monks, the All India Bhiku Sangha, also reacted to the attacks. Its chairperson, Bhante Sadanand Mahasthaver, said: "Buddhist monks all over the country feel saddened by the attack. The international community is also shaken. We try to put people on the right path and we have been made the target of an attack. The All India Bhiku Sangha condemns this attack. This should not have happened. We spread the message of peace across the world. This is an attempt to spread terror and create discord among the messengers of peace". The Rajya Sabha condemned the attacks on Mahabodhi Temple; Chairman Mohammad Hamid Ansari described the attacks as "senseless act of violence" and "a cause of anguish and deep concern to all". The Government of Bihar proposed to establish an Anti Terrorist Squad unit in the state after the bombings.

The 14th Dalai Lama called the attack "unfortunate". Lobsang Sangay, Prime Minister of the Tibetan government-in-exile, said: "I am deeply saddened to learn about the series of bomb blasts at Mahabodhi Temple. My prayers [are] for the injured and their family members". Karmapa Ogyen Trinley Dorje said he was "saddened to hear of the senseless violence" and asked Buddhists "to remain calm and refrain from any further escalation of the violence". Karmapa Trinley Thaye Dorje said he was "deeply saddened to hear of the bomb attacks", and prayed "that we are all able to respond with compassion to all those affected by this tragic event".

Sri Lankan President Mahinda Rajapaksa was shocked by the news of the explosions: "[i]t is with deep sadness that I condemn the explosions within the hallowed precincts of the most venerated and sacred Bodh Gaya shrine in Bihar in India. Undoubtedly, it is one of the holiest shrines highly respected and venerated not only by Buddhists throughout the world, but by all peace-loving human beings".

Burmese government and opposition leader Aung San Suu Kyi expressed her unhappiness over the blasts.

The Government of Thailand was "deeply disturbed by the bomb explosions", voicing security concerns.

Delegates from a number of Buddhist traditions at the Eighth Global Conference on Buddhism in Singapore passed a resolution on the bombings:

"We are deeply saddened, but we forgive those responsible for bombing the Mahabodhi Temple in Bodhgaya. You may damage the most important temple in Buddhism but you will not destroy our faith in forgiveness and compassion".

The Northeast Indian Bhikkhu Sangha and Buddhists submitted a memorandum to the Prime Minister of India: "It is indeed a sad incident that miscreants tried to cause damage to one of the holiest Buddhist shrines which is not only the place of Buddha’s enlightenment but from where the message of love and compassion pervaded the entire universe. The Mahabodhi Mahavihara, also being a World Heritage Site, is venerated by the world Buddhist community and such acts of vandalism deserve our strongest words of disapproval. We condemn the dastardly act and request the Government to deal with such anti social elements with a strong hand so that such acts of mindless violence do not occur again in any place of worship of any religious denomination".

In Nagpur during a protest, Buddhist monk Bodhi Priya Vinay tried to immolate himself but was stopped by police. Buddhist monks from Thailand, Laos, Myanmar, Bangladesh, Vietnam and Sri Lanka, including the World Fellowship of Buddhists, condemned the Gaya attacks. Throughout India, protestors led peace rallies and bandhs against the Bodh Gaya bombings.

World Council of Churches general secretary Olav Fykse Tveit expressed "heartfelt sorrow and solidarity" over the bombings. In a letter to the Buddhist community, he said: "We wish and hope that this incident, despite its traumatic and tragic dimensions, may be transformed into an opportunity to offer the world a glimpse of the best of your morality and spirituality".
