= Zabiuddin Ansari =

Lashkar-a-Taiba terrorist

Sayed Zabiuddin
- Born: 30 November 1980 (age 45); Georai, Maharashtra, India
- Occupation: Islamic militant
- Organization(s): Lashkar-e-Taiba; Indian Mujahideen

Sayed Zabiuddin Ansari a.k.a. Abu Hamza or Abu Jundal (born 30 November 1980) is an Indian Islamic militant belonging to Indian Mujahideen and Lashkar-e-Taiba. Zabiuddin Ansari's name was featured in the list of "50 most wanted criminals sheltered in Pakistan" released by India on 21 May 2011. He was the handler of the 10 LeT terrorists during 2008 Mumbai attacks.

He was a suspect in several cases such as the Kalupur station blast case of 9 February 2006 and an accomplice in the 2010 Pune bombing case. He was deported from Saudi Arabia on 25 June 2012 and was in the custody of Indian security agencies. On 2 August 2016, he was sentenced to life imprisonment in relation to the arms haul case by the special MCOCA court.

== Early life ==
Zabiuddin was born on 30 November 1980 in a village Hathi Khana mohalla in Georai area of Beed district in Maharashtra in western India. His father Syed Zakiuddin had worked as an insurance agent. Syed Zakiuddin's family consists of five sisters and one son, Zabiuddin. Zabiuddin had studied in Urdu up to Class X in Georai and joined Industrial Training Institute (ITI), Beed.

He was arrested by the Indian police in Maharashtra in 2003 for stabbing and attempting to immolate a woman, with whom his family was entrenched in a marital dispute. Subsequently, he was sent to jail but was bailed on conditions of appearing at the relevant court hearings. He never returned for the proceedings.

Ansari moved to Pakistan after his college. He married in 2009 to a Pakistani woman and has a son in Pakistan. The Pakistani passport he used, showed him as a resident of Sheikhpura in Pakistan's Punjab province.

== Militancy ==
Zabiuddin trained for terrorism in Pakistan in the 2000s and recruited for Lashkar-e-Taiba, and Indian Mujahideen.

Zabiuddin was introduced into LeT by a senior in college Fayaz Kagazi, who is suspected to be in Saudi Arabia. Fayaz also sent him for training to assemble bombs. He narrowly escaped an arrest in 2006 and reached Pakistan via Bangladesh.

Zabiuddin had lived in Pakistan for sometime after which he moved to Saudi Arabia where he worked as a teacher. He had been missing since 2005 and is known to have used at least ten aliases.

The central security agencies of India interrogated many terrorists to find his location. From these interrogations it was known that he worked at terrorist camps near Karachi and Pakistan administered Kashmir.

== Mumbai attacks ==
Zabiuddin was the Hindi tutor and handler of the 10 terrorists responsible for the 2008 Mumbai attacks that claimed 166 lives. Zabiuddin is believed to be one of the four LeT men who had come to send off Ajmal Kasab and nine other terrorists from Karachi a week prior they went to Mumbai.

Investigators allege that Zabiuddin Ansari was present in Lashkar’s Karachi based control room during the Mumbai attack.

Zabiuddin has claimed after his arrest that LeT chief Hafiz Saeed was also present in the LeT control room from where they had directed the Mumbai attack terrorist incident. Zabiuddin additionally claimed that ISI and Pakistani army officials helped plan the Mumbai attacks. According to him, those present at the control room later celebrated the terrorist attack. The control room was later destroyed by ISI in 2008.

According to him, the coordinated attacks were previously scheduled for 2006, using Indian youth for the job. However, a huge cache of AK-47s and RDX, which were to be used for the attacks, was recovered from Aurangabad in 2006 thus leading to the dis mantling of the original plot. Subsequently, Abu Hamza fled to Pakistan and along with Lashkar commanders, scouted for Pakistani youth for the attacks. In September 2007, ten people were selected for the mission. In September 2008, these ten terrorists tried sailing to Mumbai from Karachi, but failed to complete their mission due to choppy waters. The LeT terrorists tried again in November 2008 and managed to execute the final attacks.

== Arrest ==
Security agencies had been chasing him for 3 years in Delhi. A terrorist who was arrested by Indian security agencies in connection with the 2010 Jama Masjid attack gave a tip about him being in Saudi Arabia. Intelligence agencies, including western agencies, zoomed in on Ansari's location after he set up a website for recruiting youth for Lashkar under an alias Kaasif. This alias was known as one used by Ansari to the Indian intelligence agencies. Also, the US agencies noticed a high traffic between Ansari's website and other jihadi websites they were monitoring, and they asked Saudi intelligence to detain Ansari.

The arrest of Abu Jundal could be more significant than that of Ajmal Kasab as Jundal was amongst six main planners of the attacks. His evidence could have more credibility because of his presence in Pakistan. Investigation has confirmed some state support during the attacks when Abu Jundal and others from a control room in Karachi gave orders to 10 attackers.

=== Diplomatic negotiations ===
Initial attempts to get Zabiuddin into custody had failed because, although a native of Beed in Maharashtra, he used a Pakistani passport to travel to Saudi Arabia, under the alias Riyasat Ali. The passport also showed his father's name as Mohammed Khushi and residence as to Sheikhupura in Punjab, Pakistan. According to the Indian home ministry, Pakistan’s ISI pressured Saudi Arabia for months to prevent Jundal being handed over to India.

According to Indian Government sources, his arrest came after months of diplomatic negotiations involving authorities in Riyadh, Washington DC, and New Delhi. Intelligence Bureau director Nehchal Sandhu worked with Prince Muqrin bin Abdulaziz, then director General of Saudi Intelligence agency Al Mukhabarat Al A'amah during the investigations. Indian and Saudi Intelligence services identified Ansari off of tapped phone calls.

=== DNA identification ===
DNA test was also used to establish his identity. The DNA test had matched and Saudi authorities were persuaded for handing him to India.

=== Deportation ===
On 21 June 2012, the Intelligence Branch took custody of Abu Hamza alias Sayed Zabiuddin on his deportation from Saudi Arabia at the Indira Gandhi International Airport in New Delhi, and on 25 June 2012, formally handed him over to Delhi Police, that announced the arrest, for him to be produced at the New Delhi Court for trial. The arrest of Sayed Zabiuddin was touted as the most significant development in the 2008 Mumbai attacks case after Kasab's arrest.

== Interrogation ==
In July 2012, he was interrogated by several Indian security agencies for several cases of which he is accused.

=== Pakistani passport and IDs ===
Zabiuddin although being an Indian, held a Pakistani passport and two Pakistani identity cards, which pointed towards Pakistan's involvement. One of the two Pakistani identity cards provided to him was for internal use in Pakistan while the other was to be used outside Pakistan. His Pakistani passport was issued under the name Riyasat Ali.

The documents had mentioned his address at a place close to Muridke, where the Lashkar-e-Taiba headquarters is situated. However, Pakistan has strongly rejected any insinuation of involvement by state actors in any acts of militancy in India. Pakistani Foreign Secretary Jalil Abbas Jilani while on a visit to India offered a joint investigation into Mumbai attacks.

=== The Karachi Control Room ===
According to Indian government, the Karachi control room was created by Pakistani intelligence agency I.S.I. along with Lashkar-e-Taiba in Pakistan to monitor a Mumbai attack. Accordingly, the Delhi Police has registered a criminal case of conspiracy to launch another terror attack on India.
