= Sanjeev Kumar Yadav =

Indian police officer

Sanjeev Kumar Yadav IPS, PPMG (Eleven Times)
- Born: 9 July 1971 (age 55)
- Education: Allahabad University; Guru Nanak Dev University
- Occupation: Indian Police Service (IPS) Officer
- Employer: Jammu and Kashmir Police
- Spouse: Shobhna Yadav
- Children: 2 (1 daughter and son)
- Awards: President's Police Medal for Gallantry (PPMG)Eleven Times

Sanjeev Kumar Yadav PMG is an officer of IPS (promoted from DANIPS) cadre. He currently serves as Divisional Commandant, Home Guards, in J&K Police. He received the President's Police Medal eleven times for Gallantry.

== Early life and education ==
Sanjeev Kumar Yadav was born on 9 July 1971. He has done his graduation from Allahabad University in 1991 and masters from Guru Nanak Dev University in 1999.

== Batla House case ==
He was a part of the Batla House encounter case with Delhi Police. He played a major role in this case.

=== In popular culture ===
In 2019 a Bollywood film named Batla House, directed by Nikhil Advani was made, being based on this encounter. in which his character was played by famous Bollywood actor John Abraham.

== Personal life ==
Yadav is married to Shobhna Yadav a news anchor, with whom he has a son and a daughter.

== See also ==
- Batla House encounter case
- Batla House
