= 2007 Uttar Pradesh bombings =

Bombings targeting lawyers in India

23 November 2007 Uttar Pradesh Serial Blasts
- Three cities of Uttar Pradesh where bombs were planted
- Location: Lucknow, Varanasi and Faizabad, India
- Date: 23 November 2007; 13:05 – 13:32 (UTC+5:30)
- Target: District Courts of India
- Attack type: Bombings
- Weapons: Improvised explosive devices made with Ammonium nitrate and RDX
- Deaths: 18
- Injuries: 81
- Perpetrators: Indian Mujahideen; Harkat-ul-Jihad-al-Islami (also suspected)
- Accused: 4
- Charges: Unlawful Activities (Prevention) Act
- Verdict: Life sentence
- Convicted: 2

Six consecutive serial blasts rocked Lucknow, Varanasi and Faizabad courts in Uttar Pradesh on 23 November 2007 afternoon in a span of 25 minutes, in which reportedly many people were killed and several others injured.

Bombs were explicitly targeted to the lawyers who were working in courts premises at these cities. The first blast occurred in Varanasi civil court and collectorate premises between 13:05 and 13:07 pm. Two successive blasts occurred in Faizabad district court around 13:12 and 13:15, closely followed by one at Lucknow at 13:32.

In December 2019, 2 (Tariq Quasim and Mohammad Akhtar) of the 4 accused were given a life sentence by a special anti-terror court in Faizabad for carrying out the attacks under the Unlawful Activities (Prevention) Act, while one was acquitted and another had died in police custody.

== Lucknow blasts ==
In Lucknow two bomb were found one triggered panic after explosion and other unexploded powerful live bomb was deactivated by bomb disposal squads. Both the bombs were planted in bicycles in civil court premises. Lucknow blast was mildest among all other blasts in Faizabad and Varanasi.

== Varanasi blasts ==
Three consecutive blasts claimed the most lives in Varanasi; at least 11 people were killed, including four lawyers and 42 injured. Bombs were tied to bicycles which exploded around 13:05–13:15.

== Faizabad blasts ==
Two successive blasts occurred in Faizabad, which were strongest among all. In these blasts at least four people were killed on the spot, and about 15 were injured.

== Terror mail just before blasts ==
A little-known group Indian Mujahidin has claimed responsibility of these blasts. This group apparently sent an email to some private TV channels just five minutes before the blasts. This email says the jihad in India is in retaliation against the injustice to Muslims in India, the demolition of the Babri Masjid and the Gujarat riots.

Indian Mujahideen also claimed responsibility for the blasts in Delhi and Hyderabad but refused any association with the attacks on the Mecca Masjid, the Samjhauta Express and the 2006 Malegaon blasts.

== HuJI's hand suspected ==
Investigating agencies suspect the hand of Bangladesh based terrorist outfit Harkat-ul-Jihad-al-Islami(HuJI) pointsman who goes by the name Guru has emerged as a prime suspect. Intelligence agencies suspect that Guru may have planned the attacks executed by sleeper cells of Lashkar-e-Taiba and Jaish-e-Mohammed possibly under the banner of al-Qaida-fil-al-Hindi (meaning al-Qaida in India).

== Lawyers' strike to protest blasts ==
Bar Council of Uttar Pradesh decided to go on strike to protest against these terrorist activities. In the state capital, lawyers moved about in groups in the court compounds and raised slogans against terrorism. The government has tightened security arrangements in the courts throughout the state after the Friday blasts. Lawyers from other states also join state bar council and observing the day as shok diwas.

== Reactions ==
- The Union Home Ministry of India said it's a terrorist strike meant to disturb communal harmony.
- The Chief Minister of Uttar Pradesh, Mayawati condemned serial blasts and announced a compensation of Rs.200,000 to the next of kin to each of those killed and Rs.50,000 for those injured in the incidents. She also said that it is a complete failure of central intelligence agencies.
- The Prime Minister of India, Dr. Manmohan Singh condemned serial blasts and announced a compensation of Rs.100,000 from the Prime Minister's National Relief Fund to kin of each of those killed in blasts.
- British High Commissioner to India Richard Stagg said in a statement "We condemn all forms of terrorism. It is a particularly worrying development that the judiciary and the legal system have been attacked. Our thoughts are with the affected families".

== See also ==
- Terrorism in India
