= Mohan Chand Sharma =

Indian police officer (1965–2008)

Police Inspector Mohan Chand Sharma AC
- Official Portrait, 1989
- Born: 23 September 1965 as Chaukhutia, Uttarakhand, India
- Died: 19 September 2008 (aged 42); New Delhi, Delhi, India
- Other name: M. C. Sharma AAA
- Known for: Batla House encounter
- Relatives: Maya Sharma (Wife)
- Police career
- Department: Delhi Police
- Service years: 1989-2008
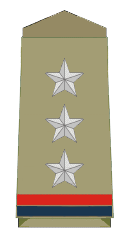
- Rank: Police Inspector
- Awards: Ashoka Chakra

Mohan Chand Sharma AC (23 September 1965 – 19 September 2008) was an Indian police officer who was killed during the 2008 Batla House encounter in New Delhi. He was posthumously awarded the Gallantry medal Ashoka Chakra Award, India's highest peacetime military decoration, on 26 January 2009.

== Life and career ==
Sharma, a Kumaoni, was born in Chaukhutia Masi region of Almora in Uttarakhand. He joined the Delhi Police as a sub-inspector in 1989, and continued to serve for 19 years. He was a part of the Special Cell, an anti-terrorist unit of the Delhi Police Force.

Sharma, along with ACP Rajbir Singh, were credited for gathering prima facie evidence in the Parliament attack in 2001. Their efforts led to the conviction of mastermind Afzal Guru, who was executed in February 2013.. He and Rajbir also received an Out-of-turn promotion, when they killed notorious UP gangster Rajbir Ramala and his accomplice, Inderpal Singh, in 1995.

Sharma was also a veteran of several operations in Jammu and Kashmir. He led the police raiding party that neutralized Abu Huzefa, a Lashkar-e-Taiba district commander, and, though in command, fired the most rounds of anyone in the party. He was later recommended for a gallantry award for the 2007 killing of Lashkar-e-Taiba militant Abu Ammar in Doda. Ammar carried a 10 lakh bounty and was wanted for the 30 May killing of Deputy Superintendent of Police Shelly Singh of the J&K Police Special Operations Group. In August 2020, Sharma received his seventh gallantry medal for a 2007 operation in which he and his team tracked down and killed Jaish-e-Mohammed commander Qari Saifullah, the mastermind of the Ayodhya attack, and arrested his accomplice, Zafar Iqbal. One sub-inspector was injured in that operation. He received a number of awards and decorations during his career, including seven gallantry awards.

== Death ==
On 19 September 2008, Sharma, along with a few Delhi Police officers, was involved in the Batla House encounter. In a firefight with Indian Mujahideen's terrorists, who were involved in the 13 September 2008 Delhi bombings, Sharma received bullet injuries to his abdomen, thighs and right arm. He was taken to the nearest hospital, but he died during treatment. According to the autopsy performed at the AIIMS, he died of excessive bleeding.

== Batla House case ==
He was a part of the 2008 Batla House encounter case with Delhi Police. He played a major role in this case, and a film was also made about it called Batla House. in which his character was played by famous Bollywood actor Ravi Kishan.

=== Tributes ===
A number of high officials paid tribute to Sharma, including Home Minister Shivraj Patil and Police Commissioner Y. S. Dadhwal. Prime Minister Manmohan Singh praised his "exceptional courage" and called him "an inspiration for our security forces." The Prime Minister also sent a message of condolence to Sharma's wife, as did INC president Sonia Gandhi.
