= Riyaz Bhatkal =

Founder of Indian Mujahideen, a terrorist organization

- Born: Shah Riyaz Ahmad Mohammed Ismail Shahbandari; Bhatkal, Karnataka, India
- Organization: Indian Mujahideen
- Relatives: Iqbal Bhatkal (brother)

Shah Riyaz Ahmad Mohammed Ismail Shahbandari, known as Riyaz Bhatkal, is an Indian Islamist militant who is the co-founder, leader and a wanted terrorist of Indian Mujahideen, a terrorist group based in India. Riyaz Ismail Shahbandri is one of the Indian Mujahideen's three top commanders and is currently based in Karachi, Pakistan along with his brother Iqbal Bhatkal.

== Early life ==
He was born in Bhatkal, Karnataka and studied engineering. In his earlier days, he was an activist of Students Islamic Movement of India and later founded the Indian Mujahideen with several of its members; transforming the student organisation into a jihadist group.

== Militancy ==
According to Pune Police, Mohsin Ismail Chowdhury, an accused for the German Bakery blast was recruited by Iqbal Shabandari, while Iqbal was living in Mumbai. While the two Bhatkal brothers were living in Khondwa, Pune they presided over terrorist networks that later carried out multiple bombings across the country. Attacks committed in various Indian cities by the Indian Mujahideen, including the 2008 Ahmedabad bombings, were claimed through emails sent to media on the instructions of Riyaz. He is suspected in the 2006 Mumbai train bombings where he is said to have procured the explosives used in the bombings of the suburban railway.

In all the cases above Riyaz is an absconding accused. Riyaz is currently based in Karachi, Pakistan along with his brother Iqbal where they fled to in the aftermath of the Batla House encounter in 2008. Yasin Bhatkal, another co-founder of the IM lead the group's operations while the brothers coordinated from Karachi. Yasin was later caught and sentenced to death in India and the brothers are now believed to operate their own faction of the group, dubbed the "Karachi project", with help of Pakistan's Inter-Services Intelligence and the Lashkar-e-Taiba.

Bhatkal's name was listed in the list of "50 most wanted" criminals sheltered in Pakistan. An Investigation by NIA reveals that Riyaz was frustrated with Pakistan's ISI officials due to their bad treatment.

In 2013, it was revealed that in response to a request for a nuclear weapon, Bhatkal had responded that "Anything can be arranged in Pakistan".

== See also ==
- Inter-Services Intelligence activities in India
- Pakistan and state-sponsored terrorism
