= 2011 Agra bombing =

Terrorist incident in India

- Location: 27°12′33.63″N 78°0′28.79″E; Agra, Uttar Pradesh, India
- Date: 17 September 2011; 5:45 p.m. (UTC+05:30)
- Attack type: Bombing
- Weapon: IED
- Deaths: 0
- Injuries: 15+
- Perpetrator: unknown
- Motive: Possibly because of a rivalry between two hospitals

There was a blast in Indian city Agra on 17 September 2011 around 5:45 PM, at Jai Hospital, At least 15 people were injured and no fatalities were reported.

Uttar Pradesh DGP and chief secretary to the Union home ministry said that due to the edge competition between two private hospitals the blast might have happened.
