= 2012 Pune bombings =

Terrorist attacks

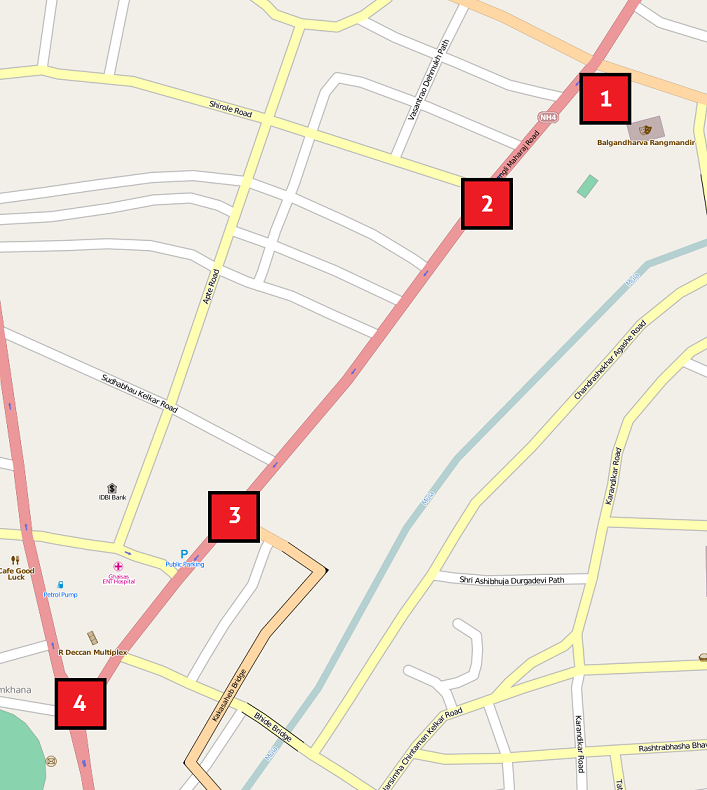
- Map of the 2012 Pune attacks showing the principal targets numbered: (1) Balgandharva Auditorium, (2) Near Dena Bank, JM Road, (3) McDonald's restaurant, (4) near Garware Bridge. Pune (India)
- Location: Multiple locations at J.M. Road, Pune, Maharashtra, India.
- Date: 1 August 2012 (IST, UTC+05:30)
- Attack type: Bombings
- Deaths: None reported
- Injuries: 1
- Perpetrator: Indian Mujahideen
- Motive: To avenge the murder at Pune's Yerwada Jail of Qatil Siddiqui, who was an accused in the German Bakery blast case

The 2012 Pune bombings was a series of four coordinated, low-intensity bombing attacks that occurred on 1 August 2012 across Pune, the ninth-largest metropolis in India. As of October 2012, Indian Mujahideen, a terrorist group based in India, is suspected to be behind the attacks.

The explosions occurred at locations within a radius of 1 km in Jangli Maharaj Road: in front of Balgandharva Auditorium, opposite to KFC restaurant near Garware Bridge, Dena Bank branch at Jangli Maharaj Road, and in front of a McDonald's restaurant. A fifth live bomb found on JM Road was later defused. The bombs left one injured. All blasts occurred between 7:27 pm and 8:15 pm.

The bombings took place on the evening when the new Home Minister Sushil Kumar Shinde was scheduled to visit the Tilak Smarak Ranga Mandir, a play theatre in the city, for an award ceremony.

== Victims ==
Dayanand Bhaurao Patil (age 34), a local tailor, was the only one who was injured. The bomb went off while he was handling the bag. Patil, with minor injuries on his face and stomach, was admitted to Sasoon Hospital and was later interrogated by the police as a suspect. Patil was carrying the explosives in a cake box with sticky material, two detonators and a pencil cell. According to his initial statement, Patil, on his way home, had stopped at Balgandharva Auditorium to listen to the speeches at the protest against corruption organised by India Against Corruption with his bag containing his lunchbox besides him. When he stood up to leave, he claimed that he must have picked up the wrong bag. After walking for some time, when he realised this and opened the bag, it exploded.

== Speculations ==
The Police Commissioner of Pune suggested that given the low intensity of the blast and extent of damage, the attacks were rather a mischief than a terrorist attack. However, given the sophisticated circuitry used in the devices, central agencies suspected the role of a terrorist organisation. It was also speculated that the bombings may have been carried out to avenge the murder of Indian Mujahideen commander Qateel Siddiqui or to avenge a central government recommendation that the ban on SIMI be extended for a few more years. Qateel Siddiqui, named in 2010 Pune bombings, 2010 Jama Masjid attack and 2005 Indian Institute of Science shooting, was murdered at Pune's Yerwada Jail in June 2012. Few days ago, the Pune police had received a letter saying Qateel's death would be avenged.

== Investigations ==
The Anti-Terrorism Squad of the Maharashtra Police promptly started investigation of the blasts. Eyewitnesses reported that the bombs were placed in a garbage can and a cycle carrier. The blasts were of such low intensity that members of India Against Corruption who were sitting for an andolan nearby did not know of the blast till the bomb disposal squad arrived.

The National Investigation Agency (NIA) and the National Security Guards (NSG) were alerted following the blasts and NIA teams were dispatched to Pune and Mumbai.

Ammonium nitrate was found to have been used as explosives, with 9 volts batteries as triggers. A total of seven IEDs were used in the blasts. Initially, the bomb disposal squad experts suggested that the moist weather may have reduced the intensity of the blasts. However, upon further investigation, it was found that while the bombs had been constructed to cause maximum damage and take many lives, a design flaw had prevented them from fully exploding.

There were no individual suspects even on 2 August, primarily due to the fact that the CCTV cameras near the blast sites were non-functional. However, the use of bicycles and triggers suggested the possible involvement of Indian Mujahideen.

The Pune Police was criticised for mishandling the evidence at the crime scene. Photographs showed cops lifting the bicycle used for the blasts with their bare hands, contaminating the fingerprints on the cycle. Gloves were not used by many cops while searching the crime scene. Policemen were seen searching for evidence with bullet proof vests, when they should have been using bomb suits and explosive trace detectors.

By 3 August, based on the leads obtained from the owner of a cycle shop that had sold the bikes, the investigators were looking for two suspects aged between 25 and 30 who spoke Hindi and Gujarati. While inspecting CCTV footage, investigators found a man, closely resembling Yasin Bhatkal, Indian Mujahideen (IM) operative, coming on a bicycle and parking it opposite the Sai Service petrol pump.

=== Arrests ===
As of 27 December 2012, a total of eight suspected Indian Mujahideen (IM) terrorists have been arrested. The arrestees are:

- Langde Irfan – allegedly an expert in computer and brother-in-law of one of the Pune blast accused, Asad Khan,
- Asad Khan – allegedly a recruiter, motivator and ideologue of IM,
- Imran Khan
- Syed Firoze – one of the planters
- Sayed Maqbool alias Zuber, a history-sheeter, accused of making the IEDs used in the blasts.
- Sayyed Arif alias Kashif Biyabani – identified potential recruits for IM
- Munib Iqbal Memon – purchased the SIM cards for phones used in the blasts
- Farooq Bagwan – purchased the SIM cards for phones used in the blasts

Delhi Police said that many of the arrestees confessed of their involvement in the blasts.

== See also ==
- 2010 Pune bombing
- List of terrorist incidents, 2012
- Terrorism in India
- 2008 Mumbai attacks
- Alfred Herrhausen - only previously known case of a bicycle bomb
