= 2005 Delhi bombings =

2005 Islamist terror attack in Delhi, India

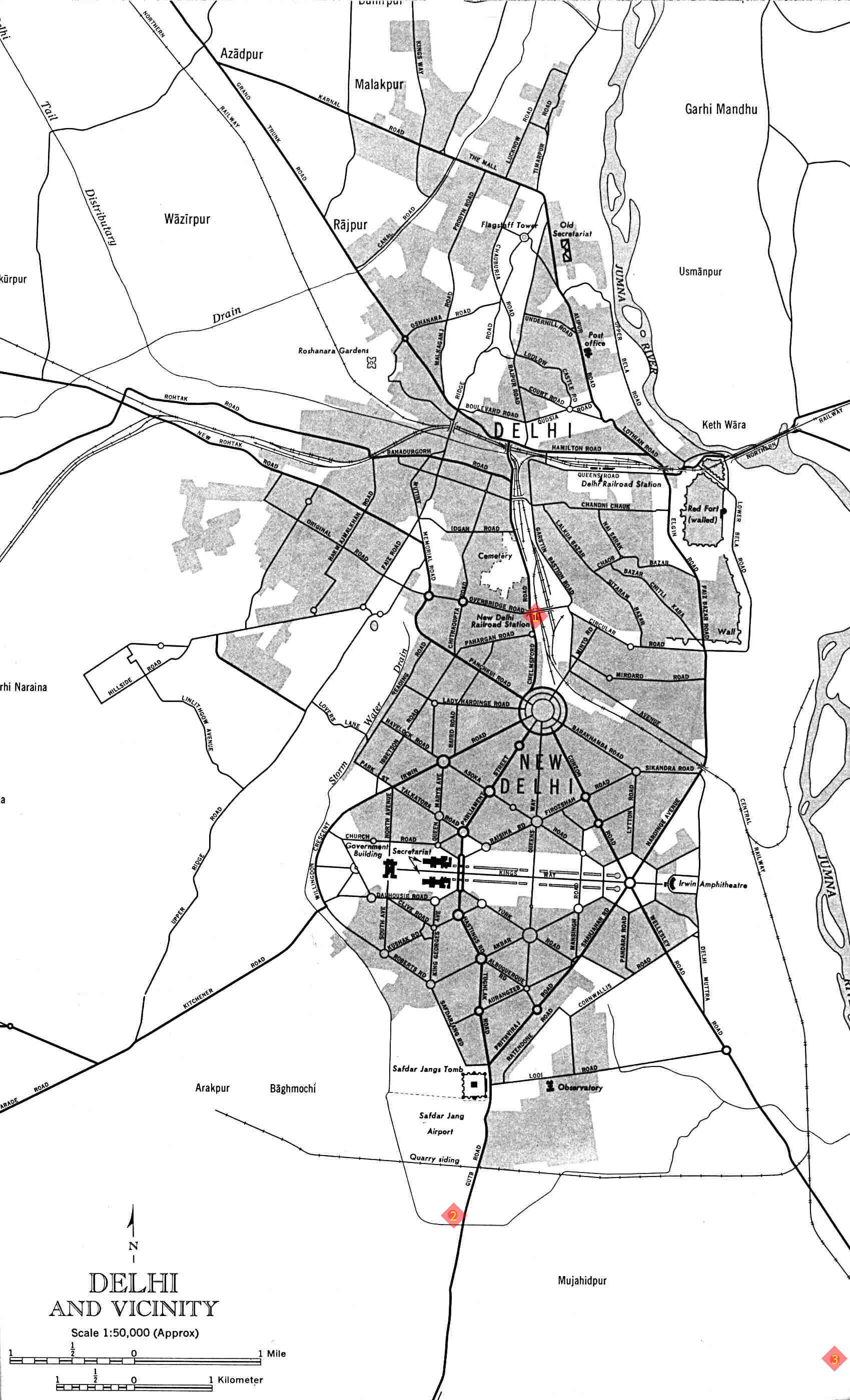
- Delhi map showing the location of the bomb blasts: (1) Pahargunj, (2) Sarojini Nagar market, (3) Govindpuri
- Location: Delhi, India
- Date: 29 October 2005; 5:38 pm – 6:05 pm (UTC+5.5)
- Target: Two markets and a bus
- Attack type: Bombings
- Deaths: 62
- Injuries: 210
- Perpetrators: Lashkar-e-Taiba; Indian Mujahideen
- Motive: Islamic terrorism

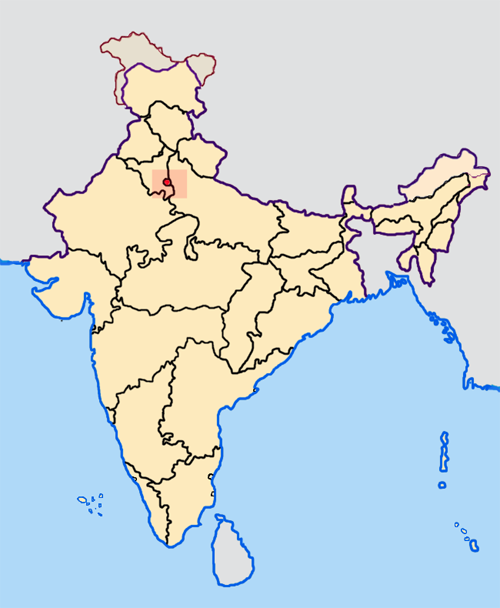
India map showing Delhi

The 2005 Delhi bombings occurred on 29 October 2005 in Delhi, India, killing 62 people and injuring at least 210 others in three explosions. The bombings came only two days before the important festival of Diwali, which is celebrated by Indians. The bombs were triggered in two markets in central and south Delhi and in a bus south of the city. The Pakistani Islamist terrorist group Lashkar-e-Taiba claimed responsibility for the attacks under the pseudonym of Islamic Inquilab Mahaz. The Indian Mujahideen is also suspected of involvement.

President A P J Abdul Kalam condemned the blasts in Delhi and sent condolences to the bereaved and other victims. Kalam appealed to the people "to maintain calm and help the agencies in relief and rescue work." Parts of India were moved to higher alert following the blasts.

== Timeline ==
The blasts happened as follows:

- The first blast took place in the main bazaar of Paharganj near the New Delhi Railway Station at around 5:38 pm (UTC+05:30).
- The second blast took place near a bus in Govindpuri area at 6:00 pm (IST)^{*} in the southern part of the city.
- Within minutes of the second explosion, at 6:05 pm (IST)^{*}, the third explosion took place in South Delhi's busy Sarojini Nagar market.

=== Modus operandi and suspects ===
- The first explosion (Paharganj explosion) occurred outside New Delhi Railway Station. The explosive device was planted in a two-wheeler (generic term used in India for any motorised vehicle with two wheels, such as a motorcycle or a motorscooter). When the bomb exploded, it ripped apart the M S Medicos, a medical shop outside which the two-wheeler was parked. According to Rediff.com the shop was badly damaged with glass strewn all over the street and blood splattered all over the ground. When the explosion took place large number of people were eating golgappas in the adjoining snacks-cum-sweet shop resulting in the high number of deaths in the area.
- The Govindpuri explosion, which took place inside a bus, injured nine people, four critically. 35–40 people were travelling in the bus when the conductor of the bus spotted a suspicious plastic bag which none of the passengers claimed. The passengers were already suspicious as a man had climbed aboard the bus and refused to buy a ticket, according to the BBC, leaving his large, black bag aboard. The driver and conductor of the bus quickly alerted and disembarked the passengers and, by doing so, minimised the damage when the bomb was thrown out of a window. At the time of the explosion, only five people remained inside the bus. However, the driver and conductor sustained injuries in their rescue effort, and the driver's condition was critical according to NDTV. According to the Indian police, the Govindpuri bomb operated on an electronic timer.
- The third and most devastating explosion took place in a very crowded corner of the busy Sarojini Nagar market. According to The Hindu website, the eyewitnesses claim that the bomb was placed in a white colour Maruti van whose front and rear mirrors were shattered due to the explosion. The bomb went off near a vendor using a gas cylinder, which exploded, triggering multiple explosions and leading to an outbreak of fire in a row of shops. Apart from resulting in the death of 43 people and injuring about another 28 people, half-a-dozen clothing shops and a few vehicles parked behind these shops were destroyed due to this explosion.
- It is believed that the explosive used to carry out the blasts is RDX.
- It is also believed that the blasts were connected to Quds Day, on Friday, October 28, 2005, which creates terror worldwide, against Israel and United States. To mark the Jumu'atul-Wida, which is the last Friday of Ramadan, as Al-Quds Day, was initiated by Iranian spiritual leader Ayatollah Khomeini, in 1979 to support Palestine Muslims.

== Suspects ==
The Pakistan-based Islamist terrorist group Lashkar-e-Taiba claimed responsibility on a jihadist website, through the name of "Islamic Inquilab Mahaz" (Islamic Revolutionary Front). It had previously carried out similar attacks in Karachi using the same name.

The Delhi Police released three sketches of one of the suspected bombers involved in the bombings. According to NDTV, ten suspects have been detained following the blasts. Five of them were picked up from the Delhi Railway station and others from other railway stations and bus terminals.

Tariq Ahmad Dar, was arrested in Kashmir, as the alleged suspect of the attacks on 10 November 2005. The police also arrested the suspected Govindpuri bomber, Mohammed Rafiq Shah. They were freed in Feb 2017 for lack of evidence.

== Casualties ==
Thirty eight people were declared dead in Safdarjang hospital, ten in Lady Hardinge Hospital, five in Ram Manohar Lohia hospital and two in AIIMS. The number of fatalities later rose to 62, with about 210 injured.

29 October 2005 casualties
Place	Deaths	Injured	Sources
Pahargunj blast	18	60	(Rediff)
Sarojini Nagar market blast	43	28	(Rediff)
Govindpuri blast	0	4	(Rediff)
Total	61	92	

== Rescue and relief operations ==
Relatives of the dead and injured received money and medical help from the government:

- "Rs 300,000 will be given as ex-gratia to next of the kin of every dead person, while those seriously injured will get Rs 50,000," Delhi Chief Minister Sheila Dikshit told reporters.
- The injured received free treatment at any government hospital.

== Reactions ==
Delhi police ordered all temples and restaurants in Delhi closed shortly after the explosions, and the city of Delhi went on red alert.

=== Bomb hoaxes ===
At least two phone calls reporting fake bombs have been received by the Delhi police, including a false report of a bomb in a school (or a fair) for people with visual disabilities. In addition, there was a phone call reporting a (purportedly fake) bomb near a bank in Khari Baoli before the attacks occurred; the object referred to by the call was a suitcase, in which there were documents, batteries, and wires. In the midst of the attacks, there was another hoax call reporting a bomb going off in the Gole Market.

The Delhi police, after the explosions, sent out messages to the public asking them to report unidentified objects. This led to a wave of reports of "bombs", all of which proved to be either nonexistent or more benign objects, including a "bomb" at the Som Bazaar in eastern Delhi and another "bomb" near the Sanjay Gandhi Hospital.

== World reaction ==
The bombings have provoked strong international condemnation from the United States, Britain, Canada, Australia, China, Sri Lanka, Japan, Belgium, Brazil, Iran, UAE, European Union, Bangladesh, Maldives, and South Africa.

== See also ==
- 1993 Mumbai bombings
- List of terrorist incidents
- Pakistan and state-sponsored terrorism
