= 2006 Varanasi bombings =

Bombing of a Hindu temple in Varanasi, India by Islamic terrorists

- Location: Varanasi, Uttar Pradesh, India
- Date: 7 March 2006; 18:20 IST (UTC+05:30)
- Target: Sankat Mochan Hanuman Temple and Varanasi Cantonment Railway Station
- Attack type: Bombing
- Deaths: 28
- Injuries: 101
- Perpetrator: Lashkar-e Qahab

On March 7, 2006, the Indian city of Varanasi witnessed a series of bombings in which at least 28 people were killed and 101 injured. Varanasi is considered holy by Hindus and is one of the oldest living cities in the world. In June 2022, after 16 years of hearing, Ghaziabad district and sessions court convicted the mastermind and terrorist Waliullah Khan and sentenced him to death.

== Blasts ==
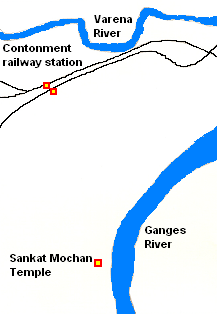
Map of blast locations

=== Blast at the Temple ===
The blasts occurred nearly simultaneously shortly after 18:00 IST. The first blast took place at 18:20 at the crowded Sankat Mochan Hanuman Temple near the Banaras Hindu University. Hundreds of pilgrims were in temple as it was a Tuesday, believed to be particularly holy by the devotees of Lord Hanuman, a deity at the temple. The bomb was placed in a container near a gate at the temple where women usually sit. It claimed 10 lives and injured 40.

=== Blast at the station ===
One other blast followed at the Varanasi Cantonment Railway Station. It occurred in the waiting area next to the travel office. Initially another blast was reported inside the stationary Shiv Ganga Express bound for Delhi; however, this was later discounted. The Shiv Ganga Express departure was delayed by 2 hours, eventually arriving in Delhi 4 hours late but intact. Six bombs were reported defused from other areas in the city, including a restaurant frequented by foreigners, in the vicinity of the railway station. It claimed 11 lives and injured 20.

== Timing of the blasts ==
It is estimated that the date and time of the explosions were selected for causing maximum damage. The CBSE and ISC Examinations (India's school leaving examinations) were in progress and therefore there were many students and worshippers at the temple when the bombs exploded during the Aarti ceremony. Tuesday was also a holy day of the deity at the temple. It is further conjectured that the bomb at the railway station was orchestrated to coincide with the throng of passengers waiting for Shiv Ganga express.

== Rescue and relief operations ==
- The railway ministry announced ex-gratia of IN Rs 100,000 to the next of kin of those who died in the explosion at the Cantonment railway station in Varanasi.
- Seriously injured would be sanctioned IN Rs 25,000 each while those with minor injuries will get IN Rs 1,000 each.
- The railway ministry would bear all expenses of food, medicine and accommodation of the injured persons during the period of treatment.

== Investigation ==
Pakistan-based Lashkar-e-Taiba militant outfit, whose member was shot dead in an encounter with police near Lucknow on Wednesday, were prima facie behind the blasts in Varanasi, a senior Uttar Pradesh government official said in Varanasi on Wednesday.

Uttar Pradesh, Chief Secretary, Mr. Sinha said bombs were made in Bihar. The material to make bombs was procured in Nepal which was then smuggled across the porous Indo-Nepal border.

== Official response ==
Indian Prime Minister Manmohan Singh condemned the blasts and appealed for calm. A state of high alert was declared in India's major cities. Police were sent to all major places of worship in New Delhi. India's Cabinet Committee on Security met in emergency session. Varanasi shut down Wednesday to protest the blasts; shops and businesses closed, and authorities closed schools and colleges. It reopened on 9 March.

Uttar Pradesh Chief Minister, Mulayam Singh Yadav, claimed that UP Police killed one of the suspected Pakistani involved who turned out to be a resident of Madhya Pradesh, but he was part of Lashkar-e Taiba Islamic group and police were on the lookout for him in context of Delhi blasts of 2005.

== Reactions ==
=== Domestic ===
The Prime Minister of India Manmohan Singh condemned the blasts and appealed for calm. A state of high alert was declared in India's major cities. Police were sent to all major places of worship in New Delhi. India's Cabinet Committee on Security met in emergency session. Varanasi shut down Wednesday to protest the blasts; shops and businesses closed, and authorities closed schools and colleges.[5] It reopened on 9 March.[6]

Uttar Pradesh Chief Minister, Mulayam Singh Yadav, claimed that UP Police killed one of the suspected Pakistani involved who turned out to be a resident of Madhya Pradesh, but he was part of Lashkar-e Toiba Islamic group and police were on the lookout for him in context of Delhi blasts of 2005.

== Suspects ==
A little known group calling itself the Lashkar-e Kahar/Qahab has claimed responsibility for the attacks. A spokesperson for the group who identified himself as Abdullah Jabbar alias Abu Feroz called a local news agency in Srinagar on Thursday morning to claim responsibility for the blasts and threatened similar attacks in other cities unless the government stopped its "catch and kill" campaign in Jammu and Kashmir. A staff of the TV channel said that Feroz spoke in Urdu with a heavy Punjabi accent. It is speculated that the bombings were carried out in retaliation of the arrest of a Lashkar-e-Toiba agent in Varanasi earlier in February 2006. Some analysts see a connection between the bombings and Hindu-Muslim clashes in the city of Lucknow on 4 March 2006 that left four people dead. These clashes started because of protests against the President of the United States George W. Bush's India visit. It is also believed that these attacks were a part of a series which included an attack at the IISc, Bangalore and also at the Akshardham Temple, Gujarat.

== See also ==
- 2010 Varanasi bombing
- List of massacres in India
