= 2010 Jama Masjid attack =

Islamic jihadi attack in Delhi, India

- Location: 28.6507°N 77.2334°E; Jama Masjid, Delhi, India
- Date: 19 September 2010; 11:30 (UTC+05:30)
- Attack type: Shooting, failed car bomb
- Injuries: 2
- Perpetrator: Indian Mujahideen

The 2010 Jama Masjid attack occurred on 19 September 2010 when two gunmen on a motorcycle fired at a tourist bus near Gate 3 of the Jama Masjid in Old Delhi, India and injured two Taiwanese tourists. The incident provoked fears about security for the upcoming Commonwealth Games in Delhi. About three hours later a car parked approximately 150 meters from the spot caught fire, apparently due to a minor blast.

Two bike-borne gunmen opened fire at a stationary tourist bus purportedly carrying a TV crew from Taiwan at 11:24 pm, near Gate 3 of Jama Masjid. An explosive-laden device was planted in a Maruti 800 car, parked near a transformer near the mosque. The car had approximately 20 litres of fuel in its tank, which would have caused considerable damage if it had exploded successfully, but bomb timers failed and it did not go off. There were two victims of the shootout, Zeseweiu (27) and Chiang (28), both Taiwanese citizens. Zeseweiu head was grazed by a bullet while trying to escape, while Chiang was shot in the abdomen and had to be operated on. Both were declared to be out of danger the next day when the state CM and Union Home Minister paid them a visit.

== Batla House encounter link ==
"In the name of Allah we dedicate this attack of retribution to martyrs, Shaheed Atif Amin and Shaheed Mohammad Sajid who proudly laid down their lives valiantly fighting the idol worshippers Delhi police on this day. Surely each and every drop of their blood brought a new life in the Muslim community and this is confirmed from the fact that Indian Mujahideen have swelled unexpectedly manifold."

— Email sent to media

The attack is significant because it took place on the second anniversary of the Batla House encounter on 19 September 2008, in which Atif Amin, suspected member of the Indian Mujahideen was killed. The Indian Mujahideen had been blamed earlier for a number of terror attacks, in Delhi, Ahmedabad, Jaipur Surat and Faizabad, between 2007 and 2009. According to investigating agencies, the revival of the group was announced in an email to the media, which also elaborated on the outfits intention of avenging the death of their former members.

== Investigation ==
Subsequent police investigations revealed that one of the timers of the cooker bomb was timed to go off exactly at 11:37 am, approximately the time when the Batla House encounter was reported to have taken place two years before on the same day.

The terror attack took place barely 200 meters away from the Jama Masjid police station, and at the time of the shooting, the cops from PCR van stationed at gate number 3 had gone to settle a family brawl nearby in the Khankhana street, in the Machli Bazar area, allowing the bikers to flee. The Guide (Vikrant K.Sharma) accompanying the T.V team took the injured inside the bus and called the police immediately, the 20 CCTVs which were installed near the Masjid, were found to be lying defunct. The cameras had been installed on 14 April 2006, after the twin blasts at the Masjid. According to the police, the terrorists were divided in two groups; the first reached the spot on a motorcycle and the second group followed them in a Maruti car, which later caught fire due to the "crudely assembled" pressure cooker bomb in it. Police detained 30 people for questioning.

Subsequent investigations revealed that the revelatory email was sent through a SIM card connection whose location was traced to Borivali. It was purchased by a man in his 20s, from a shop in the Dadar Truck Terminus area in Mumbai, and the police were looking for a man from Beed in Maharashtra, who had furnished a driver's license and a pan card under the name "Purva Shinde".

On 30 November 2011, the Delhi Police arrested six suspected Indian Mujahideen operatives whom they claimed to be the perpetrators of the 2010 Pune bombing, the Chinnaswamy stadium blast and the 2010 Jama Masjid attack. One Pakistani national was also reported to have been arrested. Two of the seven people were arrested in Chennai and were identified by the Delhi Police as Mohammad Irshad Khan (age 50) and Abdul Rahman (age 19), hailing from the Madhubani district of Bihar. Another individual – Ghayur Jamil – a student at a madrasa in Darbhanga was also arrested from Madhubani on the charge of recruiting youths from near the Indo-Nepal border for terrorist activities, Abdul Rahman was said to one such recruit. Jamil's father disputed his son's arrest and billed him as a good orator and an honest, religious man who had lost a bag containing his belongings – including his PAN card, residential proof and photos – a few days back.

In August 2013, Yasin Bhatkal co-founder of the Indian Mujahidin and his close aid Assadullah Akhtar alias Haddi were arrested by National Investigation Agency and as per NIA, in the interrogations they accepted that they had carried out the attack at the Masjid. As per NIA, Yasin said that he was instructed by Karachi-based IM head Riyaz Bhatkal to target the mosque as the group was upset with Imam Ahmed Bukhari for allowing "semi-naked" foreigners inside it.

On 19 April 2014, the special cell of Delhi Police filed its final report before a local court in Delhi against the two under various sections of the IPC including 307 (attempt to murder), 120B (criminal conspiracy) and under the provisions of Unlawful Activities (Prevention) Act and the Arms Act. The police claimed in the charge sheet that Bhatkal was instructed by Pakistan-based handlers to carry out terror attacks just before the beginning of 2010 Commonwealth Games which were held in Delhi.

== See also ==
- Terrorism in India
