= 2010 Pune bombing =

Terrorist attack in Maharashtra, India

- Location: 18°32′23″N 73°53′14″E; Pune, Maharashtra, India
- Date: 13 February 2010; 16 years ago 19:15 IST (UTC+5:30)
- Attack type: Bombing, terrorist attack
- Weapon: Improvised explosive device
- Deaths: 18
- Injuries: 54+
- Perpetrators: Lashkar-e-Taiba; Students' Islamic Movement of India; Indian Mujahideen

On 13 February 2010 at approximately 19:15 Indian Standard Time, a bomb exploded at a German bakery in the Indian city of Pune, Maharashtra. The blast killed 18 people, including an Italian woman, two Sudanese students and two Iranian students, and injured at least 60 more.

The German bakery is located near the local Jewish Chabad House and the Osho International Meditation Resort in Koregaon Park, Pune. Both the ashram and the bakery are frequented by foreigners; the bakery was filled with tourists and locals at the time of the attack.

Two Islamist groups, Lashkar-e-Taiba and the Indian Mujahideen (Students' Islamic Movement of India), claimed responsibility for the bombing under pseudonymous names. According to Indian government agencies, the attack could have been part of a project by Lashkar-e-Taiba to use the Indian Mujahideen in what is called the "Karachi Project". David Coleman Headley, a Pakistani−American terrorist who co-plotted the 2008 Mumbai attacks, has been accused of involvement in the project and bombing.

== Location and time ==
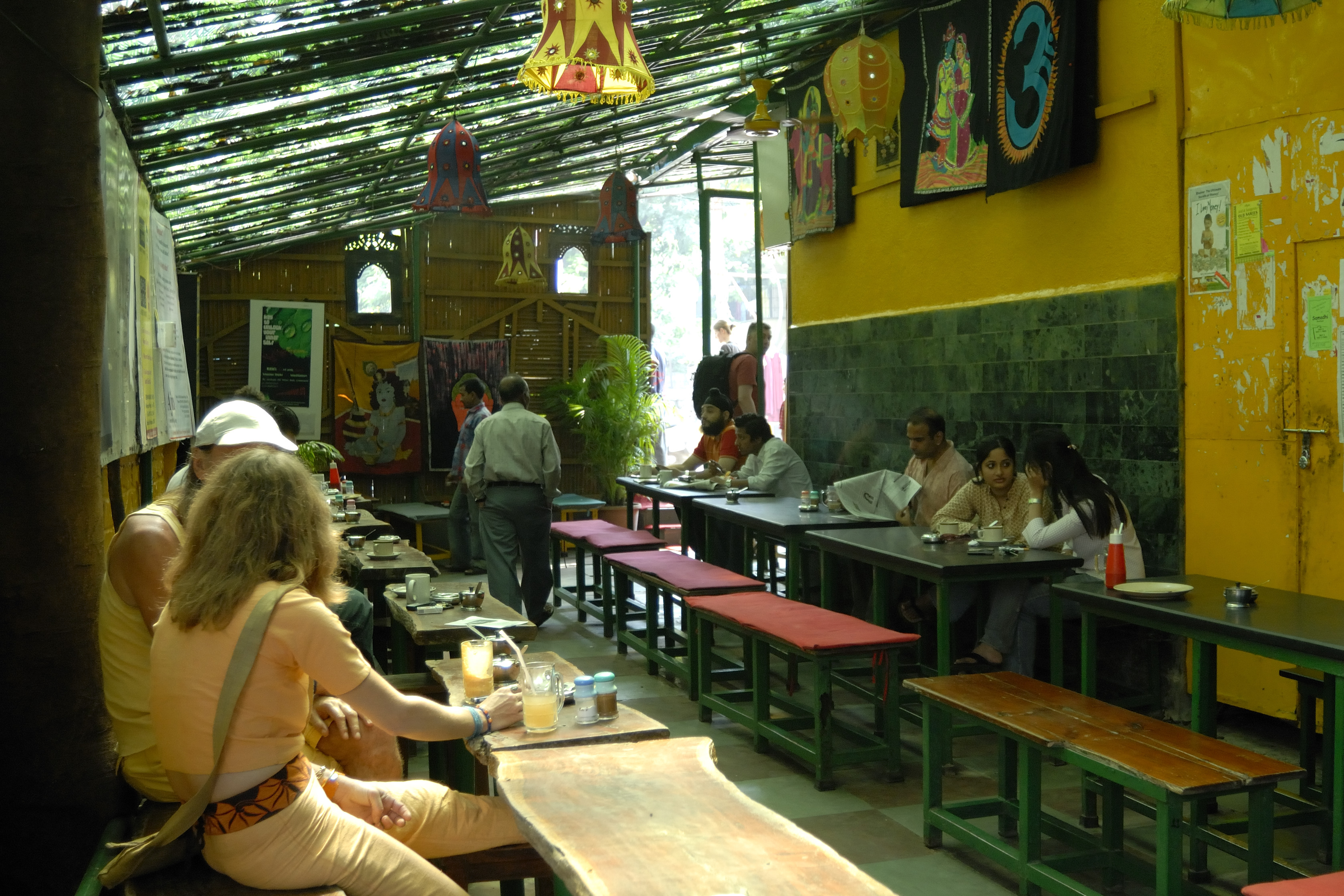
The German Bakery in November 2007

The site of the bombing was the German Bakery, a two-decade-old popular establishment in Pune. The bakery, situated on the ground floor of a corner building in the Koregaon Park area of Pune, was reduced to rubble, though the rest of the building was left intact. At the time of the explosion, the bakery's limited seating areas were full of students and foreign visitors from the nearby Osho Ashram. A security alert had been issued in October 2009 for a Jewish Chabad house in the vicinity of the German Bakery, but the Bakery was not deemed to be at risk at the time.

Initial media reports indicated that a Liquefied petroleum gas (LPG) cylinder used for cooking had caused the blast, but the Pune City Fire Brigade issued a statement that the cylinders at German bakery were intact. Businessman Bharat Turakhia, who suffered shrapnel injuries from the blast, saved several lives by taking the victims to a hospital and helped the police in their investigation. Security agencies confirmed shortly thereafter that the explosion was a terrorist strike.

== Victims ==
Deaths by nationality
Country	Number
India	13
Sudan	2
Italy	1
Nepal	1
Iran	2
Total	19

Nine people were killed instantly. The rest of the victims succumbed to their injuries a few days later, while undergoing treatment. The Chief Minister of Maharashtra, Ashok Chavan, announced:

"Regarding the compensation payment to the dead, the families will be paid ₨.500,000 (US$11,000) per person who has died in the unfortunate incident. And whatever the medical expenditure is for the people who have been admitted to the hospitals the costs will be entirely covered by the government."

About 60 people were injured in the bombing; 46 were men and the rest were women. 12 of the injured were foreigners: five were Iranian, two were Sudanese and two were Nepalese, and one each from Italy, Taiwan, and Yemen.

List of victims:

Name	Age	Nationality
Saied Abdulkhani	26	Iranian
Rajeev Agarwal	23	Indian
Suleiman Alfatah	21	Iranian
Amjed Algazoli	25	Sudanese
Atul Ganpat Anap	26	Indian
Anindyee Dhar	19	Indian
Ankik Dhar	24	Indian
Binita Gadani	22	Indian
Shilpa Goenka	23	Indian
Aditi Jindal	23	Indian
Nadia Macerini	37	Italian
Aditya Jaiprakash Mehta	24	Indian
Gokul Nepali	30	Nepalese
Shankar Pansare	27	Indian
Abhishek Saxena	24	Indian
P. Sindhuri	22	Indian
Anas Sulaiman	21	Sudanese
Vikas Tulsiani	24	Indian

== Equipment ==
Commissioner of Police, Satyapal Singh, after receiving the preliminary report from the Forensic Science Laboratory (FSL), stated that RDX explosive had been used. Ball bearings together with nuts and bolts were used in the bomb. He added, "According to the FSL report received last night, the material used for the explosive was a combination of RDX, ammonium nitrate and petroleum hydrocarbon oil (ANFO). However, the quantity used has not been determined yet. Also the trigger mechanism is still subject to investigation." It is not known whether a remote detonator or a timer was used to set off the blast.

== Initial hypotheses about the perpetrators and motives ==
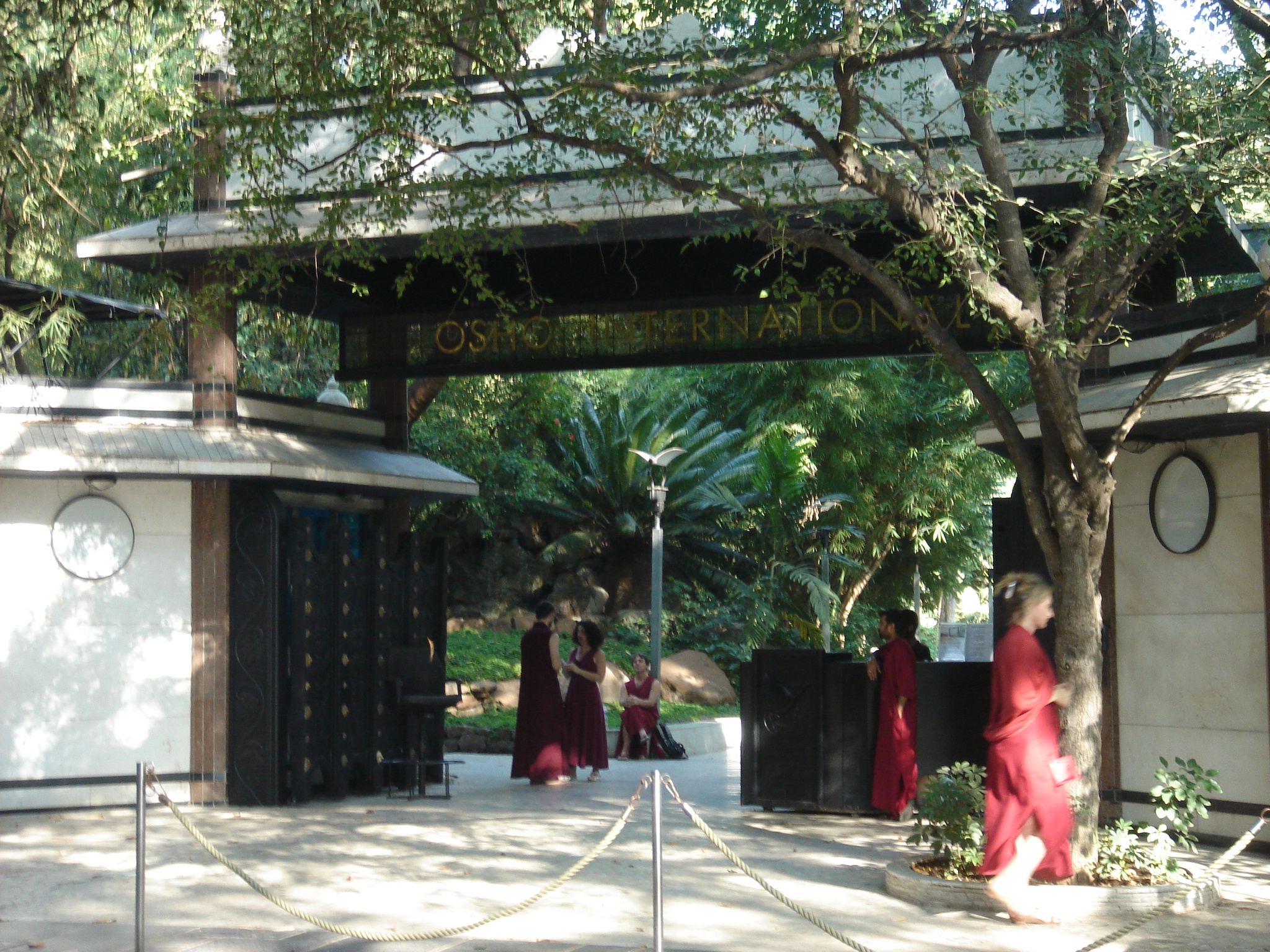
The bomb exploded 200 metres from the Osho ashram's main gate.

On 14 February, the Indian Home Minister P. Chidambaram stated that responsibility for the blast had not yet been determined, but that Indian authorities were making attempts to interview David Headley, a Pakistani-American businessman, accused of involvement with terrorism who was then undergoing trial in the United States. In connection with the bomb blast, the Indian Home Secretary, G. K. Pillai also referred to Headley. News organisations have reported that Headley had visited Pune in July 2008 and March 2009 to scout the area near the blast and described him as a suspected member of Lashkar-e-Taiba, one of the largest and most active South Asian Islamist terrorist organisations. G. K. Pillai also said that the attack could be part of a project by Lashkar-e-Taiba to use the Indian Mujahideen in what Headley apparently called the 'Karachi project' during his interrogation by the U.S. Federal Bureau of Investigation (FBI).

The attack occurred just a few days after an agreement was reached between India and Pakistan to resume dialogue at a meeting on 25 February in New Delhi. The incident added to the government's vulnerability, with the opposition asking for suspension of the bilateral talks.

A little known group calling itself the Laskhar-e-Taiba Al Alami claimed it was behind the bomb attack in Pune in a phone call to the Islamabad office of the Indian daily The Hindu. The caller appeared to be educated, and said the group had split from the Lashkar-e-Taiba due to its affinity to Pakistan's Inter-Services Intelligence. The call appeared to originate from the Miramshah or Bannu district in North Waziristan.

Ilyas Kashmiri was believed to have masterminded the attack, his 313 Brigade had claimed responsibility through an email. He was killed in a drone strike in Pakistan on 3 June 2011.

== Investigation ==
The Maharashtra Police had announced a probe was under way to establish the cause of the explosion, while a Central Bureau of Investigation team was sent from New Delhi to Pune to assist in the investigations. Consequently, the entire country was put on high alert, especially Mumbai and Hyderabad. After a detailed review of the internal security situation in the wake of the attack, Prime Minister Manmohan Singh directed the Union and Maharashtra governments to take coordinated and effective action to speedily investigate the terror attack.

Investigation in the blast was carried out by the Maharashtra government's Anti Terrorist Squad, along with the National Investigation Agency in Delhi. Maharashtra ATS Chief K P Raghuvanshi is heading the blast probe. The agency has crucial closed-circuit television camera (CCTV) footage of the alleged bombers.

Investigators first focused their attention on the possibility that the attacks were carried out by a Pune jihad cell known to have existed since at least since 2006. This came out from the questioning of Mohammad Peerbhoy, an Indian Mujahideen operative held in the course of a national counter-terrorism operation that targeted the Lashkar-linked group in 2008.

Just moments before the explosion, Paras Rimal, a waiter at the German Bakery had noticed the bag (containing explosives). When Paras moved in to investigate the bag, he was called out of the bakery by an unknown motorist who paid him ₹200 (US$2.10) to fetch a glass of water. Since Paras was away from the blast he sustained mild injuries and has become an important eyewitness for the police.

Investigators also included other Indian metropolitan cities like Bangalore and Mumbai in the probe. Over 40 people were arrested during the investigation, among them four Kashmiris in Hampi, Karnataka. Pune police arrested two suspects from Pune's suburbs on 16 February 2010. Another two were detained in Aurangabad.

The Maharashtra Anti-Terrorism Squad (ATS) identified Yasin Bhatkal, believed to be a relative of Indian Mujahideen founder Riyaz Bhatkal, as one of the main conspirators of the blast in a preliminary report submitted to the State Government on 7 April 2010. The investigating agency, in its report, has identified four more suspects involved in the blast, including the planters of the bomb – laden bag which went off in the German Bakery. Maharashtra home minister R.R. Patil told the Legislative Council that the suspects would be arrested in a few days and more details would be disclosed at a later stage.

On 24 May 2010, Maharashtra ATS arrested Abdul Samad Bhatkal, younger brother of Yaseen Bhatkal, as he got off Air India flight 812 at Mangalore International Airport for his alleged involvement in a little-known murder case. However, Home Minister P. Chidambaram later identified him as the prime suspect in the German Bakery blast. Bhatkal had left for Dubai shortly after the blast and was returning after his visa expired. He was arrested using a Lookout Notice that was issued by the Mumbai police. Samad was trying to slip into the country through the Bajpe Airport by taking advantage of the situation that prevailed following the 22 May 2010 crash at Mangalore of flight Air India Express Flight 812. Bhatkal was apprehended based on investigation of CCTV footage from the German Bakery.

In September 2010, the ATS arrested Mirza Himayat Baig (29) for his involvement in the attack, as well as his aide Shaikh Lalbaba Mohammed Hussain alias Bilal (27), both believed to be members of Islamist militant terrorist organisation LeT. Baig was said to have taken bomb-making training in Colombo in 2008.

On 30 November 2011, Delhi Police special cell arrested six suspected Indian Mujahideen operatives whom they claimed to be the perpetrators of the 2010 Pune bombing, the Chinnaswamy stadium blast and the 2010 Jama Masjid attack. One Pakistani national was also reported to have been arrested. Two of the seven people were arrested in Chennai and were identified by the special cell as Mohammad Irshad Khan (age 50) and Abdul Rahman (age 19), hailing from Madhubani district of Bihar. Another individual – Ghayur Jamil – a student at a madrasa in Darbhanga was also arrested from Madhubani on the charge of recruiting youths from near the Indo-Nepal border for terrorist activities, Abdul Rahman being one of such recruits. This charge was disputed by Jamil's father who billed him as a good orator and an honest, religious man who had lost a bag containing his belongings – including his PAN card, residential proof and photos – a few days back.

A Pune court on 18 April 2013 awarded a death sentence to Indian Mujahideen operative Himayat Baig, who was earlier in the week convicted for his involvement in the blasts. Baig's lawyer A Rahman had said that though they respected the verdict, they would appeal against it in the Bombay High Court. Baig's death sentence was commuted into a life sentence in 2018.

== Reaction ==
=== Domestic reactions ===
- India
- Prime Minister Manmohan Singh who discussed the situation with Home Minister P. Chidambaram, directed speedy investigation so that "the culprits responsible for this heinous act are identified and brought to justice at the earliest,
- Bharatiya Janata Party President Nitin Gadkari described the Pune blast as an "unfortunate incident." In a statement, opposition leader Arun Jaitley said: "The BJP urges the government to reconsider both these steps: allowing persons from Pakistani-administered Kashmir to return and resuming the dialogue with Pakistan. Terror and talks cannot coexist."
- The Communist Party of India (Marxist) condemned the Pune blast and asked the Union government to provide all help to Maharashtra to bring the guilty to book.
- Kerala chief minister V S Achuthanandan said "Terrorist strikes being reported from different parts of the country are matters of grave concern," adding that the threat should be viewed seriously and stern measures must be taken to tackle the menace.
- Sharad Pawar Union Agricultural minister, said "It is not alright to arrive at a conclusion that the entire Pune city has been targeted. The place where the blast took place is an isolated area" adding "when I was Chief Minister, Mumbai saw 11 simultaneous blasts but everything returned to normal soon."

=== International reactions ===
- Pakistan – Prime Minister Yousaf Raza Gilani condemned the blast and indicated that the Pakistani government still wants the peace talks to go ahead.
- United Kingdom – In a statement, the British High Commission condemned the Pune bombing and expressed the UK's solidarity with India. "We condemn the cowardly attack on innocent people in Pune. The UK expresses its wholehearted solidarity with India. Our sympathies and condolences are with the families of all those affected in this incident," it said.
- United States – Ambassador Timothy J. Roemer condemned the Pune bombing. "On behalf of the people of the United States, I extend heartfelt sympathy to the Government of India and the victims of this tragic terrorist blast in Pune. The US remains shoulder-to-shoulder with India in the fight against terror and will assist as needed to help bring the perpetrators of this cowardly act to justice." President Barack Obama condemned the blast that took place in Pune and expressed his condolences on the loss of life in a phone call to Prime Minister Manmohan Singh.

== See also ==
- 2008 Mumbai attacks
- 2012 Pune bombings
- List of terrorist incidents, 2010
- Terrorism in India
