= Batla House encounter case =

Indian police encounter case in Delhi

- Type: Police encounter
- Location: Flat no. L-18 (Batla House), Okhla, Delhi, India
- Planned by: Delhi Police
- Target: Terrorist outfit 'Indian Mujahideen' (IM)
- Date: 19 September 2008
- Executed by: Special Cell, Delhi Police
- Outcome: Death of two terrorists and arrest of various others
- Casualties: 3 (1 Police Inspector and 2 terrorists) killed

On 19 September 2008, an armed Delhi Police operation took place to arrest terrorists of the terrorist outfit called 'Indian Mujahideen' (IM), hiding in a flat in the Batla House area of Jamia Nagar, Okhla. The operation resulted in the deaths of two terrorists and one police officer, Inspector Mohan Chand Sharma, with the remaining terrorists arrested. On 15 March 2021, one of the arrested individuals, Ariz Khan (alias Junaid), was sentenced to death for the murder of Inspector Sharma.

== Background ==
The incident took place a week after five serial blasts on 13 September 2008 that hit Delhi in which at least 30 people were killed and over 100 injured. The killing of Atif Amin, who was the chief bomber of the terrorist outfit 'Indian Mujahideen', had dealt a severe blow to the group, which earlier been blamed for terror attacks between 2007 and 2009, in Delhi, Ahmedabad, Jaipur, Surat and Faizabad, according to investigating agencies. On the second anniversary of the encounter, a shooting took place at the gates of historic Jama Masjid, Delhi, in which two foreign tourists were injured, apart from that a car bomb with the failed timer was also found in the vicinity. The police had filed the chargesheet against Shahzad, Ariz Khan, Atif Ameen, and Mohammed Sajid on 28 April 2010, accusing them of killing Inspector Mohan Chand Sharma on 19 September 2008. On 15 February 2011, Additional Sessions Judge Ajay Kumar Kuhar framed charges against accused Shahzad Ahmed alias Pappu for the offenses of murder (Section 302), attempt to murder (Section 307), section 333 (causing hurt to public servant), 353 (assault to deter a public servant from discharge of his duty), 186 (obstructing public servant in discharge of his public functions) and 201 (causing disappearance of evidence) of the Indian Penal Code, besides section 27 of the Arms Act for his role in the 'encounter'.

== Encounter ==
The encounter took place after a seven-member Delhi Police team led by Mohan Chand Sharma, an Inspector in the Special Cell of Delhi Police, stumbled upon IM commander Atif Amin and his companions in their rented address at flat no. L-18, Batla House in the morning of 19 September 2008. Then, DCP Sanjeev Kumar Yadav also played a vital role in this encounter. The team had received specific information that a suspected person wanted in connection with the serial bomb blasts in Delhi was hiding in a flat in Batla House of Jamia Nagar.

Upon reaching the four-storied house the police's attempt to storm the flat on the second floor at around 10:30 AM (IST) led to a heavy exchange of fire. Sharma received the first burst of fire from the terrorists holed up inside. After the ensuing exchange of fire two terrorists, Atif Amin and Mohammad Sajid were killed, two other Mohammad Saif and Zeeshan were arrested, while one managed to escape. Also two Delhi police personnel were injured, among which, Sharma who led the operation, later succumbed to the injuries. Later, the intelligence team said that the arrested had links with Dubai and further questioned if they had any link with Dawood Ibrahim.

== Aftermath ==
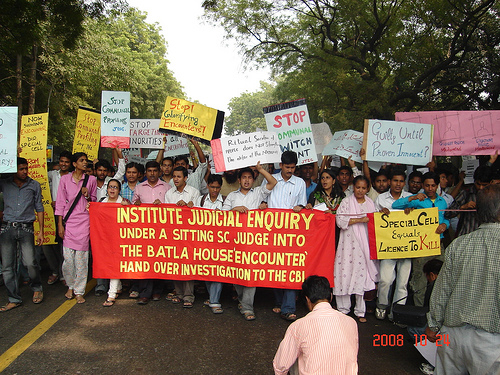
Protest rally against the Batla House Encounter on 24 October 2008 at Delhi, by teachers and students of Jamia Millia Islamia University

After the incident accusations were raised against the Police by various other politicians, media, and civil society outfits for carrying out an encounter. Upon the plea filed by NGO, "Act Now For Harmony and Democracy", the Delhi High Court on 21 May 2009 asked the National Human Rights Commission (NHRC) to enquire into the police version of the encounter, and submit its report incomplete within two months. Subsequently, on 22 July, NHRC after its investigations, in a 30-page report submitted its report which gave a clean chit to Delhi Police in the case. The inquiry ruled out the conspiracy theory suggests that it was "inter-departmental rivalry" which might have led to the death of Inspector M. C. Sharma based on postmortem report that he had a gunshot wound on the "hypochondriac region of the abdomen", which ruled out an attack from behind. In August 2009, the Delhi high court accepted the findings of NHRC and declined to institute a judicial probe.

Sharma was a much-decorated police officer and had won seven gallantry medals including the President of India's Medal in 2009. He was posthumously awarded India's highest peacetime military decoration the Ashoka Chakra on 26 January 2009.

Shahzad's sister said that her brother was falsely implicated, and vowed to fight for justice by appealing to the supreme court.

=== Demands for an inquiry ===
Several political organizations like Rashtriya Ulama Council which brought a full train of protestors from Azamgarh to Jantar Mantar, Delhi demanding an independent Judicial Enquiry whereas the Samajwadi Party and Bahujan Samaj Party (BSP) demanded a judicial inquiry into the encounter, in the Parliament, as "new versions" of the encounter, started appearing in the newspapers. Subsequently, on the Delhi High Court's directive on 21 May 2009, the National Human Rights Commission (NHRC) in its 22 July report cleared the police of any violations of rights. Public speculations and debate however continued.

=== Trials ===
The case was referred to T.D Dogra of AIIMS New Delhi for expert opinion, subsequently he appeared in court of law as an expert witness, he had explained the event through animation. On 25 July 2013, the Saket sessions court in its judgement convicted one of the suspects, Shahzad Ahmad, for murder of police inspector Mohan Chand Sharma and attempted murder of Head Constables Balwant Singh and Rajbir Singh. The court also found Ahmad guilty of obstructing and assaulting public servants, and grievously injuring the police officers to deter them from performing their duty.

After the verdict, Shahzad's defense counsel Satish Tamta accused that the court had proposed its theory while concluding that Shahzad had escaped after shooting at police officers. And the court concluded 70 witnesses, including six eyewitnesses of the raiding team of the Delhi police special cell. On 28 August 2013, Yasin Bhatkal, the Chief of terrorist outfit 'Indian Mujahideen' was arrested from India-Nepal Border. Yasin had allegedly fled the Batla House, minutes before the encounter took place.

A local court in 2021, convicted the IM terrorist Ariz Khan in the case of the Batla House shootout which he had escaped earlier.

=== Jama Masjid shooting ===
On 19 September 2010, the second anniversary of the encounter, two gunmen on a motorcycle fired at a foreign tourist bus near Gate 3 of the historic Jama Masjid in Delhi and injured two Taiwanese tourists. Subsequently, police investigations revealed that one of the timers of the cooker bomb planted in a car was timed at exactly 11.37 am the time when the Batla encounter had taken place. The e-mail, sent to the BBC and Mumbai ATS, claiming responsibility for the attack mentions two terrorists as Shaheed or martyrs. The attack gains significance from the fact that it took place on the second anniversary of the Batla House encounter in which Atif Amin, the chief bomber of the IM was killed, this had dealt a severe blow to the group, which earlier been blamed for terror attacks between 2007 and 2009, in Delhi, Ahmadabad, Jaipur Surat, and Faizabad, according to investigating agencies, the blast announced the revival of the group, in an email to the media, intending to avenge the killed terrorists.

=== 2010 Varanasi bombing ===
Mumbai Police investigations after the 2010 Varanasi bombing, indicated that Pakistan-based Bhatkal brothers, Riyaz and Iqbal, the chiefs of the terrorist outfit 'Indian Mujahideen' (IM) being the brains behind the explosion, which was carried out by Shahnawaz presently based both in Dubai and Pakistan. He is the brother of IM Root terrorist Mohammed Saif, who was arrested in the Batla House encounter. Shahnawaz along with Khalid, Abu Rashid, and Bada Sajid or Mohammed Sajid had fled to Nepal after the encounter. Shahnawaz was formerly a physician in a Lucknow Hospital and all four now hold Nepalese passports.

In April 2017, the Ahmedabad Crime Branch stated that Bada Sajid was killed while fighting for ISIS in Syria.

=== Conviction of Ariz Khan ===
A Delhi Court on Monday, 15 March 2021, awarded the death penalty to convict Ariz Khan alias Junaid in the matter relating to the Batla House encounter of 2008. Additional Sessions Judge Sandeep Yadav awarded the death sentence after observing it to be a rarest of the rare case. The Court also imposed a fine of Rs. 11 lakh on the convict, out of which Rs. 10 lakhs are directed to be given to the family of deceased Inspector MC Sharma.

== In popular culture ==
The 2019 action thriller film Batla House starring John Abraham played the role of DCP Sanjeev Kumar Yadav directed by Nikkhil Advani is based on the incident.
