= Dhurandhar Duology =

Indian film series by Aditya Dhar

Dhurandhar
- Official logo
- Directed by: Aditya Dhar
- Written by: Aditya Dhar
- Produced by: Aditya Dhar; Jyoti Deshpande; Lokesh Dhar
- Cinematography: Vikash Nowlakha
- Edited by: Shivkumar V. Panicker
- Music by: Shashwat Sachdev
- Production companies: Jio Studios; B62 Studios
- Release dates: 5 December 2025 (Dhurandhar); 19 March 2026 (Dhurandhar: The Revenge)
- Running time: 443 minutes (combined)
- Country: India
- Language: Hindi
- Budget: ₹250–255 crore (combined)
- Box office: ₹3,203.27–3,280.44 crore (combined)

Dhurandhar and Dhurandhar: The Revenge are Indian Hindi-language spy action thriller films written and directed by Aditya Dhar and produced by Jio Studios and B62 Studios. The films feature an ensemble cast including Ranveer Singh, Akshaye Khanna, Sanjay Dutt, Arjun Rampal, R. Madhavan, and Sara Arjun .The films follow an undercover Indian intelligence agent who infiltrates Lyari's criminal syndicates and political power structures in Karachi, Sindh, Pakistan; in an effort to dismantle a terror network targeting India.

Principal photography for both parts took place back-to-back from July 2024 to October 2025 across multiple locations in India and abroad, including the Indian states and union territories of Punjab, Maharashtra, Chandigarh, Ladakh and Himachal Pradesh; as well as in Bangkok, Thailand.

Dhurandhar and Dhurandhar: The Revenge were theatrically released on 5 December 2025 and 19 March 2026 respectively. Both films received acclaim for its cast performances, Dhar's direction and narrative style, cinematography, action sequences, musical score, and world-building, with criticism for its blending of fictional elements with real historical events, as well as its graphic violence. Both films were jointly produced on a budget of ₹255 crore, and became major box office successes. The Duology grossed over ₹3,200 crore and is currently the second-highest-grossing Indian franchise of all time.

== Overview ==
Film	Release date	Director	Writer	Producer(s)
Dhurandhar	5 December 2025	Aditya Dhar	Aditya Dhar	Aditya Dhar, Lokesh Dhar, Jyoti Deshpande
Dhurandhar: The Revenge	19 March 2026	Aditya Dhar	Aditya Dhar	Aditya Dhar, Lokesh Dhar, Jyoti Deshpande

=== Dhurandhar (2025) ===
After the hijacking of IC-814 in 1999 and Indian Parliament attack 2001, India's Intelligence Bureau Chief - Ajay Sanyal devises an indomitable mission to intrude and rupture the terrorist network in Pakistan, by infiltrating the underworld mafia of Karachi. Meanwhile, a 20 year old boy from Pathankot, Punjab held captive for a revenge crime, is identified by Sanyal for the mission. What follows is a network of criminals, informants and operatives whose lives intersect, navigating covert operations, espionage and betrayals.

=== Dhurandhar: The Revenge (2026) ===
The film introduces Jaskirat Singh Rangi, tracing the chain of events that compel him to become Hamza Ali Mazari, and follows his rise as he operates deep inside Lyari's criminal syndicates and political power structures in Karachi while avenging the 26/11 attacks and confronting bigger threats.

== Development ==
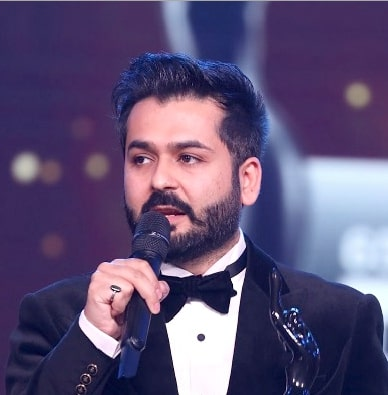
Director and writer Aditya Dhar in 2020

The project was officially announced in July 2024 by Ranveer Singh and Aditya Dhar on their social media accounts. The official title was revealed as Dhurandhar in December 2024. The film was reportedly inspired by real-life incidents, geopolitical conflicts, and the covert operations of Research & Analysis Wing (R&AW). The plot is loosely based on events revolving around 1999 IC-814 hijacking, the 2001 Indian Parliament attack, the 2008 Mumbai terror attacks, Operation Lyari, 2014 Indian general election, 2016 Indian banknote demonetisation and various other events across South Asia.

Aditya Raj Kaul, the senior executive editor at NDTV for geopolitics, national security and strategic affairs, served as the film's research consultant. He became a part of the film after having made a documentary titled "Hunting The Hijackers: The IC814 Hot Pursuit Story" based on the 2022 assassination of Zahoor Mistry, one of the hijackers of Indian Airlines Flight 814 in 1999, and became officially involved with the project after discussions about the assassination with Dhar, a long-term friend of his.

Initially, Dhurandhar was planned to release as a single film, with what would eventually be the two parts being shot together concurrently as a single project. However, the makers later decided to split the film into two during post-production due to the extensive scale, amount of footage, and narrative complexity. Reports also indicated that the project was initially structured as a streaming series, however, as the script expanded and the scale of the action increased, the developers decided the story was better suited for theatres and remodelled it into a film.

== Casting ==
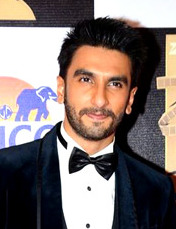
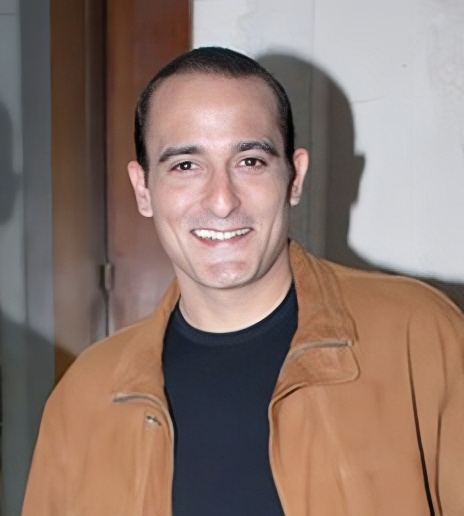
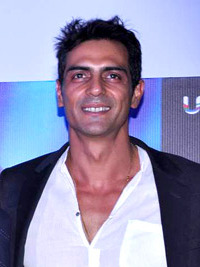
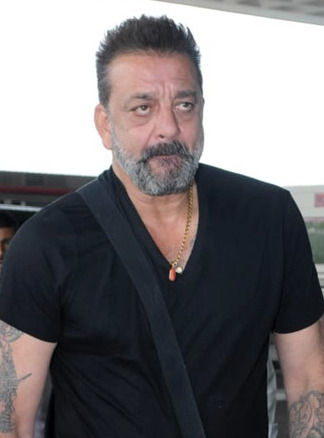
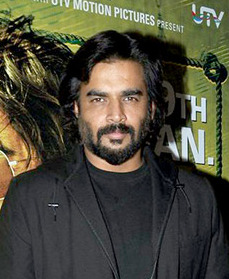
(Left to right, top-bottom) Ranveer Singh, Akshaye Khanna, Arjun Rampal, Sanjay Dutt, and R. Madhavan star in the duology.

Mukesh Chhabra was the casting director for the film. In July 2024, Singh was cast as the lead, alongside Sanjay Dutt, R. Madhavan, Akshaye Khanna, and Arjun Rampal. In October 2024, Sara Arjun was cast opposite Singh. Singh plays the role of a R&AW agent, while Madhavan was reported to be playing National Security Advisor Ajit Doval. Dutt's character was based on Pakistani police officer Chaudhry Aslam Khan, Khanna's character was based on gangster Rehman Dakait, while Rampal's character was loosely based on Pakistani soldier-turned-terrorist Ilyas Kashmiri and Major Iqbal, the shadowy handler of David Headley. Singh reportedly received a remuneration of ₹30–50 crore, while Madhavan was paid ₹9 crore. Both Khanna and Dutt received ₹2.5 crore, while Rampal and Arjun were paid ₹1 crore each. In November 2025, Saumya Tandon confirmed she would be in the film. Television actors Rakesh Bedi, Manav Gohil, Gaurav Gera, and Naveen Kaushik were also cast. Several actors auditioned for the roles of Donga and Mohammed Aalam, played by Kaushik and Gera. Sunil Grover was considered for the role of Aalam before Gera was cast.

Singh's character was rumoured to be based on Major Mohit Sharma, an Indian army officer who infiltrated terrorist groups in Kashmir, however this claim was denied by Dhar. Ahead of the film's release, the family of late Indian soldier Major Mohit Sharma filed a petition in the Delhi High Court seeking a stay on the release, accusing the makers of allegedly drawing inspiration from Sharma's life and covert operations without seeking the family's consent. The Delhi High Court directed the Central Board of Film Certification (CBFC) to consider these objections, following which the Board undertook a fresh examination of the film and found no link to Major Mohit Sharma.

Similarly, Chaudhary Aslam's widow Naureen Aslam also objected to his character's portrayal in the film, threatening to take legal action if her husband was falsely portrayed. The Makrani Baloch community of Junagadh in Gujarat also protested and threatened legal action against the filmmakers for the anti-Baloch lines spoken by Chaudhry Aslam's character in the film. Pakistan People's Party (PPP) politicians Sharjeel Memon (Sindh Information Minister), Murtaza Wahab (Mayor of Karachi) and Sumeta Afzal Syed (PPP spokesperson) criticised the portrayal of their party in the film with Syed describing the use of images featuring former Pakistani prime minister and PPP leader Benazir Bhutto as "unlawful". Another PPP politician Nabil Gabol criticised his portrayal by Rakesh Bedi in the film.

Rumours were circulated that Vicky Kaushal's character Major Vihaan Shergill from Uri: The Surgical Strike (2019) would return in the film. However, later these rumours turned out to be false. Similarly, another rumor was also circulated that Emraan Hashmi would play the role of "Bade Sahab"; this was also debunked. In February 2026, it was confirmed that Yami Gautam will feature in a cameo appearance in the second part. Initially, Anil Kapoor was approached to play a cameo in the second part but declined the role.

== Filming ==
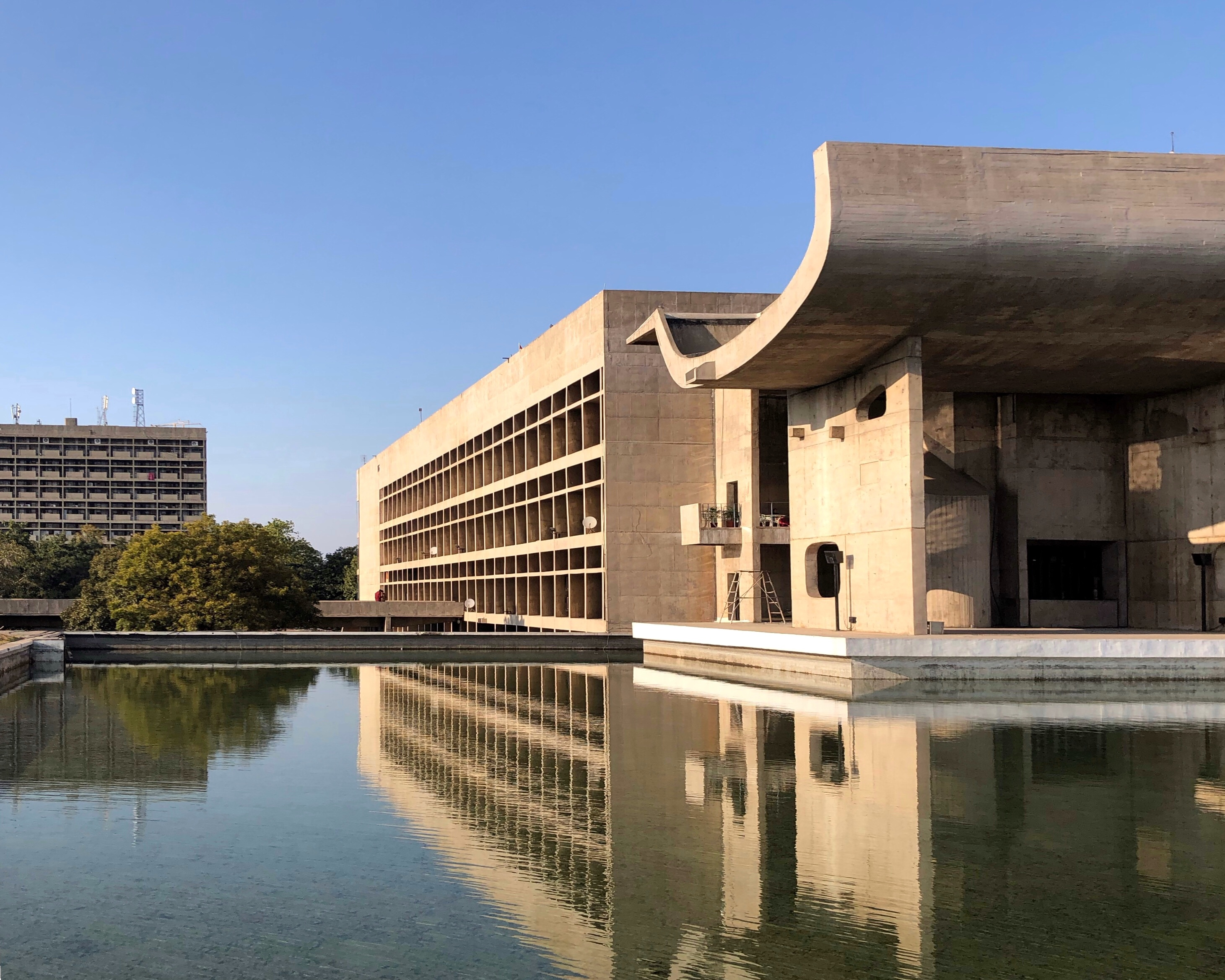
The building of the Palace of Assembly at the Capitol Complex in Chandigarh is shown as the headquarters of the Joint Intelligence Committee (JIC), New Delhi, in the films.

Both parts were shot back-to-back as a single integrated film. Principal photography began in July 2024 in Bangkok, Thailand. The second schedule commenced in November 2024 in Amritsar. In February 2025, filming took place at Filmistan in Mumbai. A schedule took place in Madh Island which was wrapped by late April 2025. In May 2025, some action sequences were filmed at the Dombivli-Mankoli bridge. In July 2025, a dance number was shot at the Golden Tobacco Factory in Vile Parle. Several scenes set in Pakistan's Lyari, were re-created in Bangkok by production designer Saini S Johray. Additional filming also took place at Khera village in Ludhiana, where the production recreated Pakistan-set sequences. In August 2025, filming moved to Ladakh, however it was halted after more than one hundred crew members were hospitalised due to food poisoning. In September 2025, some scenes were filmed at The Lawrence School in Kasauli, Himachal Pradesh. Some scenes were also filmed in Chandigarh's Sukhna Lake and Sector-17 underpass alongside Amritsar's Lal Kothi. Singh wrapped his portions in October 2025. Filming was also simultaneously wrapped in the same month.

After the success of first part, it was widely reported that Khanna would return on the sets for a short one-week shoot of the additional scenes. Later these reports turned false as no additional shoot took place.

In January 2026, it was reported that a three day patch-work shoot was held in Golden Tobacco Factory where the character arc of Arjun Rampal was shot. However, this rumour also turned false. Contrary to these reports, Dutt and Rampal were spotted shooting sequences in Ballard Estate, Mumbai. Production designer Rupin Suchak revealed that due to the tight schedule, team had to rebuild a key street sequence in Mumbai’s Film City after problems occurred at another location. He added ,“We actually opted for a full dress-up of a location in Mumbai. So we set that up in Film City entirely. That whole ambulance scene with Sanjay Dutt in the streets was also shot in Film City, The team also shot near Bora Bazar in Mumbai and transformed the busy market area for Pakistan scenes. An FIR was later filed against the location manager for flying drones in areas of South Mumbai without permission. In mid-February, BMC sought to issue a permanent blacklisting proposal to Dhar's production house B62 Studios for repeated violations of protocols during the shooting in South Mumbai area. Following this incident, All Indian Cine Workers Association (AICWA) also condemned the repeated safety violations reported during the film's shooting and demanded accountability from the makers. Singh completed the dubbing for his role in the second part in the same month.

The Arabic songs "FA9LA" (sung by Bahraini rapper Flipperachi and composed by DJ Outlaw) and "Didi (Sher-e-Baloch)" (a remix of the 1991 song "Didi" by Khaled with vocals by Moroccan singer Nabil El Houri and Kuwaiti khaliji rap duo Sons of Yusuf) which feature when Khanna and Singh's characters each visit Balochistan in the first and second films respectively, had dance sequences choreographed by Vijay Ganguly and were shot in Ladakh. They showcased tasheer, a folk gun dance of Hijaz in Saudi Arabia, and chaap, a Baloch folk war and circle dance. Khanna's improvised dance steps later became a viral trend on social media.

== Crew ==
Occupation	Film	
Occupation	Dhurandhar (2025)	Dhurandhar: The Revenge (2026)
Director	Aditya Dhar	Aditya Dhar
Producer(s)	Aditya Dhar; Lokesh Dhar; Jyoti Deshpande	Aditya Dhar; Lokesh Dhar; Jyoti Deshpande
Writer	Aditya Dhar	Aditya Dhar
Additional screenplay(s)	Ojas Gautam; Shivkumar V. Panicker	Ojas Gautam; Shivkumar V. Panicker
Cinematography	Vikash Nowlakha	Vikash Nowlakha
Editor	Shivkumar V. Panicker	Shivkumar V. Panicker
Composer	Shashwat Sachdev	Shashwat Sachdev
Lyricist	Irshad Kamil	Irshad Kamil
Production Designer	Saini S. Johray	Saini S. Johray
Action Director(s)	Aejaz Gulab; Sea Young Oh; Yannick Ben; Ramazan Bulut	Aejaz Gulab; Sea Young Oh; Yannick Ben; Ramazan Bulut
Costume Designer	Smriti Chauhan	Smriti Chauhan
Choreographer	Vijay Ganguly	Vijay Ganguly
Sound Designer	Bishwadeep Chatterjee	Bishwadeep Chatterjee
Re-Recording Mixer	Justin Jose	Justin Jose
Executive Producer	Rahul H. Gandhi	Rahul H. Gandhi
Casting Director	Mukesh Chhabra	Mukesh Chhabra

== Cast and characters ==
List indicators

This section includes characters who will appear or have appeared in the Dhurandhar film series.

- An empty grey cell indicates the character was not in the film, or that the character's official presence has not yet been confirmed.
- ^{A} indicates an appearance through archival footage or audio.
- ^{C} indicates a cameo role.
- ^{G} indicates a guest appearance in the season.
- ^{Y} indicates a younger version of the character.

Character	Films	
Character	Dhurandhar (2025)	Dhurandhar: The Revenge (2026)
Hamza Ali Mazari / Jaskirat Singh Rangi	Ranveer Singh	Ranveer Singh
Rehman Dakait	Akshaye Khanna	Akshaye Khanna^{A}
SP Chaudhary Aslam	Sanjay Dutt	Sanjay Dutt
Ajay Sanyal	R. Madhavan	R. Madhavan
Major Iqbal	Arjun Rampal	Arjun Rampal
Yalina Jamali	Sara Arjun	Sara Arjun
Jameel Jamali	Rakesh Bedi	Rakesh Bedi
Uzair Baloch	Danish Pandor	Danish Pandor
Mohammad Aalam	Gaurav Gera	Gaurav Gera
Sushant Bansal	Manav Gohil	Manav Gohil
Ulfat Jahan	Saumya Tandon	Saumya Tandon
Donga	Naveen Kaushik	
Rizwan Shah	Mustafa Ahmed	Mustafa Ahmed
Siyahi	Rouhallah Gazi	
Shirani	Bimal Oberoi	Bimal Oberoi
Babu Dakait	Asif Ali Haider Khan	
Arshad Pappu	Ashwin Dhar	Ashwin Dhar
Devavrat Kapoor	Akash Khurana	
K. S. Bhullar	Ali Raza Namdar	
Lt. General Shamshad Hassan		Raj Zutshi
Dawood Ibrahim "Bade Sahab"		Danish Iqbal
Javed Khanani	Ankit Sagar	Ankit Sagar
Altaf Khanani	Mushtaq Naika	
Azam Cheema	Vinod Tharani	Vinod Tharani
Sajid Mir	Faiz Khan	Faiz Khan
Abdul Bhuttovi	Sanjay Mehta	Sanjay Mehta
David Headley	Carl Andrew Harte	
ASP Omar Haider	Aditya Uppal	Aditya Uppal
Zahoor Mistry (Zahid Akhund)	Vivek Sinha	Vivek Sinha
Prabhneet Kaur Rangi	Madhurjeet Sarghi	Madhurjeet Sarghi
Aquib Ali Zarwari	Sanjay Mehndiratta	Sanjay Mehndiratta
Nawab Shafiq		Mashhoor Amrohi
Atif Ahmed		Salim Siddiqui
Gurbaaz "Pinda" Singh		Udaybir Sandhu
Brigadier Jahangir		Suvinder Vicky
Shazia Bano		Yami Gautam^{C}

== Reception ==
=== Box office ===
Film	Release date	Budget	Box-office
Dhurandhar	5 December 2025	₹250 crore (US$27 million) – ₹255 crore (US$27 million) (Both parts)	₹1,350.83 crore (US$140 million) – ₹1,428 crore (US$150 million)
Dhurandhar: The Revenge	19 March 2026	₹250 crore (US$27 million) – ₹255 crore (US$27 million) (Both parts)	₹1,852.44 crore (US$198.7 million)
Total		₹250 crore (US$27 million)–₹255 crore (US$27 million)	₹3,203.27 crore (US$338,7 million) - ₹3,280.44 crore (US$348,7 million)

=== Critical reception ===
==== Dhurandhar (2025) ====
Trade analyst Taran Adarsh gave 4.5/5 stars and described the film as a "brilliant" and "power-packed" action spectacle, citing its strong storytelling and box-office appeal. Gayatri Nirmal of Pinkvilla gave 4/5 stars and praised the second-half, screenplay, and background score but criticised the runtime. Siddhant Adlakha of IGN rated the film 8/10 stars and wrote "Bollywood gangster saga Dhurandhar walks a fine line between raucous entertainment and hateful propaganda." Renuka Vyavahare of The Times of India gave 3.5/5 stars and calling the film a "power-packed Karachi mafia thriller" where lead actor Ranveer Singh delivers a "subdued yet scorching" performance that largely anchors the film's impact. She highlighted the film's immersive world-building, the gritty, violent underworld of Karachi's Lyari mafia through a narrative structured in multiple chapters, with a runtime of nearly three-and-a-half hours that nevertheless "rarely feels overbearing", owing to what is described as "stylish, tight storytelling."

Devesh Sharma of Filmfare gave 3.5/5 stars and wrote "Aditya Dhar's Dhurandhar is a film that refuses to be contained by the grammar of a conventional spy thriller." Bollywood Hungama gave 3/5 stars and called it a well-made, ambitious big-screen experience with top-notch craft, memorable moments and some truly outstanding performances. Rishabh Suri of Hindustan Times gave 3/5 stars and described it as a "lengthy yet loaded spy drama", highlighting the performances of Ranveer Singh and Akshaye Khanna as well Aditya Dhar's direction. He also noted the film occasionally feels too long and dense with too many sub-plots. Radhika Sharma of NDTV gave 3/5 stars and praised the cast performances and soundtrack, but criticised the second half calling it "a completely different film altogether." Taher Ahmed of Deccan Herald gave 3/5 stars and praised the performances, cinematography, and soundtrack, but criticised the runtime, pacing, and climax.

Simran Khan of Times Now gave 3/5 stars and wrote "The Aditya Dhar actioner's ending doesn't quite justify its lengthy runtime. However the adrenaline-pumping set pieces and relentless high-voltage action, paired with a background score that amplifies the drama and keeps the tension from ever dipping, make the ride worth it." Karthik Ravindranath of The Week gave 3/5 stars and wrote "The film's powerful core is diluted by overt jingoism, unnecessary elements, and a tendency to dumb down its message for the audience. Despite these irritants, it remains a largely engaging, albeit flawed, tribute to India's heroes." Vineeta Kumar of India Today gave 3/5 stars and wrote "Dhurandhar is a sprawling, muscular, politically sharp thriller that bites off a lot, and thanks to Khanna's explosive brilliance, chews most of it successfully."

Kartik Bhardwaj of The New Indian Express gave 2.5/5 stars and wrote "The Aditya Dhar directorial seems like a film which is asking for your time, so that it can lay down its cards. But then two hours have passed and the ace seems to be still far up its sleeves." Deepa Gahlot of Rediff.com gave 2.5/5 stars and wrote "Dhurandhar may not have the dark realism of a spy story, which a web show can manage. But it does not have the flamboyance either that has come to be associated with espionage movies." Shalini Langer of The Indian Express gave 2.5/5 stars, and described the film as an "ambitious spy thriller" that ultimately works only "in flashes". She praised the film's scale, production values, and the attempt to depict the many layers of Lyari's criminal, political, and familial dynamics. However, she argued that despite its large cast and multiple narrative strands, the film only intermittently comes together, with its storytelling lacking consistency.

Sadanand Dhume of The Wall Street Journal wrote "Dhurandhar is the first major Bollywood movie to realistically portray the terrorist threat India faces." Columnist Shobhaa De wrote "It's not about politics. It's about a story – perhaps fictionalised. ... I won't mind watching it all over again. Yes, three and a half hours of it." Nandini Ramnath of Scroll.in wrote "A considerable stretch of the staggering 214-minute film is no different from gangland chronicles led by swaggering, aphorism-dripping men. Hamza's rise to the top of the Karachi underworld is soaked in blood and cliche".

Athulya Nambiar of Mid-Day wrote "It's too soon to judge Dhurandhar as a good or bad film, simply because the story isn't complete yet." Anuj Kumar of The Hindu wrote "Moored by a charismatic Akshaye Khanna and a brooding Ranveer Singh, Aditya Dhar's ambitious but overstretched and chest-thumping espionage saga serves political interests, tests endurance." Rahul Desai of The Hollywood Reporter India wrote "Aditya Dhar's second film after Uri: The Surgical Strike stars Ranveer Singh as a patriotic spy trapped in an inert and distracted action thriller." Uday Bhatia of Mint wrote "Dhurandhar offers sadism and expert bad vibes and it shares something else fundamental with Dhar's previous work—it's propaganda in service of a hawkish India, designed to flatter the ruling BJP leadership."

==== Dhurandhar: The Revenge (2026) ====
Rishabh Suri of Hindustan Times rated it 4/5, noting it as "a roller-coaster thriller that may not match the first film's precision but is elevated by Ranveer Singh's powerful performance and a gripping second half." Radhika Sharma of NDTV rated 3/5, says Dhurandhar 2 is an out-and-out Ranveer Singh show that brings pataakhe to Pakistan's terror network party and shreds it to pieces, figuratively and literally. The story follows Jaskirat Singh Rangi's transformation into Hamza Ali Mazari, with Ajay Sanyal guiding him. Action, espionage, and political commentary dominate the narrative. Divya Nair of Rediff.com gave the film 4 out of 5 stars and praised it as "an engaging, twist-filled entertainer with layered storytelling and strong impact, despite its politics, gore, and inconsistencies." Agnivo Niyogi, writing for The Telegraph, wrote that the movie "has more gore, more violence and brazen propaganda. But it lacks the finesse that Dhurandhar at least could boast of." Chirag Sehgal of News18 rated it 3.5/5, writing that "the storytelling emerges as an equally powerful driving force. The film scores high on narrative depth, with a series of twists that make the plot consistently gripping, leaving you both surprised and intrigued." Nandini Ramnath, writing for Scroll, noted "Dhurandhar: The Revenge is Marco, L2: Empuraan or K.G.F: Chapter 2, but with malice that meshes seamlessly with pro-government propaganda." Shubhra Gupta, writing for the Indian Express, gave the movie a rating of 2/5 and added that it fails to match the standard of the first part. Bollywood Hungama rated 4.5/5, stating that the movie "packs a solid punch, with twists and turns that catch you off guard and first-rate performances." Vineeta Kumar of India Today awarded 3.5 out of 5 stars and wrote "Dhurandhar: The Revenge is not subtle cinema. It is loud, unapologetic, and absolutely certain of itself. But within that loudness lies design, control, and a clear cinematic voice." Siby Jeyya of India Herald rated 4/5 stars and called it "a long, loud yet relentlessly gripping sequel that goes deeper, darker and more emotional, emerging as a powerful cinematic experience despite minor flaws." Renuka Vyavahare of The Times of India rated it 3/5, noting "a well-crafted, engaging saga that doesn't know when to stop," and describing it as "a relentless action extravaganza teetering on excess." Mayank Shekhar of Mid-Day rated it 3.5/5, writing that it features "straight-off connections playing on your mind, so seamlessly blurring fantasy and non-fiction." Sajin Shrijith of The Week rated it 3.5/5, stating that it is "longer and paced differently compared to its predecessor," with some portions feeling "a bit more stretched out than necessary — specifically in the third act." Nonika Singh of The Tribune gave the film 3/5 stars and wrote that "violence, too, gets a double X treatment: limbs chopped, heads rolling and foul language could well be its default setting."

Anuj Kumar, writing for The Hindu, wrote "Dhurandhar 2 roars, but in its deafening cocktail of patriotism and propaganda, it forgets the quiet cost of humanity, leaving little space for reflection." Mamta Raut of Mashable India concluded that the film is "a paradox," calling it "a brilliantly executed spy thriller" that "leans heavily into propaganda." Simran Singh of Daily News and Analysis rated 4/5, stating that the film "ups the ante in terms of action, gore, violence, performances, and even the length." Sowmya Rajendran of The News Minute called the part 2 as "angrier, louder, more blatant in its messaging—and ultimately emptier." Lachmi Deb Roy of Firstpost rated it 3.5/5, calling it "engaging, immersive, and ferociously intense," while noting that the dialogues are "witty, emotional, and razor sharp," and the action is "well thought out" rather than mindless. Devesh Sharma of Filmfare.com gave 3.5 stars out of 5 stars and described Dhurandhar: The Revenge as "a loud, gory, hyper-nationalistic spectacle that storms in with scale and swagger but forgets the value of brevity." Kartik Bhardwaj of Cinema Express labelled it, "a masterful, stylish piece of mythmaking that mixes gripping storytelling with heavy political messaging." Uday Bhatia of Mint viewed it as "a rage-fuelled, hyper-violent sequel driven by propaganda and spectacle, but weakened by excess and lack of emotional depth." Gayatri Nirmal of Pinkvilla praising the execution, also observes that "the second chapter, feels slightly sluggish," and the background score doesn't match the impact of the first instalment. Srujani Mohinta of Zee News wrote that "with patriotic and emotionally charged dialogues, adrenaline-pumping sequences, and heroic moments, the film comfortably fits into the category of a classic mass entertainer." Sneha Bengani of CNBC TV18 observes a spectacle-heavy sequel driven by Ranveer Singh's presence, yet weighed down by thin characterisation and excessive runtime. Sakshi Salil Chavan of Outlook India gave 2/5 stars, observes that Dhurandhar: The Revenge "leans heavily into gore, violence and strong pro-government messaging," but "falls short of recreating the rich worldbuilding that defined the first film." Princy Alexander of Onmanorama notes that the first half "remains immersive," while the sequel "embraces a far more brutal and visceral tone," making it "noticeably more graphic and gory."

== See also ==
- Back-to-back film production
