= Azam Cheema =

Pakistani terrorist (1953–2024)

- اعظم چیمہ
- Born: 1953; Faisalabad, Punjab, Pakistan
- Died: February 28, 2024 (aged 70–71)
- Other names: Baba; Babaji
- Organization: Lashkar-e-Taiba (LeT)
- Wanted by: India; United States
- Accomplices: List: LeT members: Hafiz Saeed; Abdul Rehman Makki; Zakiur Rehman Lakhvi; Faheem Ansari; Abu Jundal; Zarrar Shah; Sajid Mir; Syed Abdul Karim Tunda; Al-Qaeda members: Ahmed Omar Saeed Sheikh; Abu Zubaydah; Mohamed Atta

Azam Cheema (Urdu: اعظم چیمہ, romanized: ʿĀẓam Cīma, 1953 – 28 February 2024), also known as Baba or Babaji, was a Pakistani Lashkar-e-Taiba operative who was the mastermind of the 2008 Mumbai attacks and the 11 July 2006 Mumbai train bombings. In November 2010, the United States Department of the Treasury announced sanctions against him just before Barack Obama's visit to India. A citizen of Pakistan, he was described as the intelligence chief of the Lashkar-e-Taiba and was specifically involved in teaching operatives bomb making and infiltrating India.

Cheema was born at Faisalabad in 1953. He was sanctioned as a Specially Designated Global Terrorist under the Specially Designated Nationals and Blocked Persons List by the Office of Foreign Assets Control; where his addresses are listed in Islamabad, Muzaffarabad and Bahawalpur. Cheema, aged 70, died from a heart attack in Pakistan on 28 February 2024.

== Early life and career ==
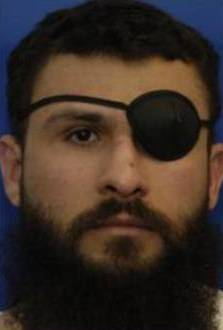
Abu Zubaydah, the Al-Qaeda's logistics commander. Cheema arranged for his stay at a safehouse in Faisalabad

Born in 1953 in a lower middle class Punjabi Muslim family, Cheema eventually became a teacher of Islamic studies at the Government Municipal Degree College, Faisalabad. While teaching there in the 1980s, Cheema joined a circle of Islamist professors from the University of Engineering and Technology, Lahore who were involved with the Ahl-i Hadith movement. The members of this group were Lashkar-e-Taiba (LeT) founder and commander Hafiz Saeed, Abdul Rehman Makki and Zafar Iqbal. According to analyst Stephen Tankel of the National Defence College, Cheema was stationed in India from 1991 to 1992, and assisted the creation of the LeT's networks in the country.

Investigations by the Mumbai Police revealed Cheema knew Osama bin Laden and other Al-Qaeda commanders. It is said Cheema was pivotal in transporting Al-Qaeda logistics commander Abu Zubaydah to a Faisalabad safehouse in March 2002, on behalf of the Pakistani external intelligence agency, the Inter-Services Intelligence (ISI). In 2016, an Indian public prosecutor claimed Cheema was a retired ISI agent hailing from Sialkot. Cheema was known to have great expertise in reading maps, and also fought in the Soviet–Afghan War, though there is little information about his activities in the war. After the demolition of the Babri Masjid in 1992, Saeed charged Cheema with creating a new front in mainland India which had different objectives than those in Kashmir.

Cheema's role in the LeT was managing operations in India, excluding Kashmir. He led a distinct unit for these operations and only communicated with its members. Although he was not the LeT commander for Kashmir, Cheema was nevertheless an eminent figure in its operations there and attended multiple public memorials for LeT operatives who died there and elsewhere in India. Cheema was described as the intelligence chief of the Lashkar-e-Taiba and specifically involved in teaching operatives bomb making. He also worked on infiltrating terrorists into India, establishing militant training camps and supplying arms. Saeed, Cheema, Abdul Rehman Makki, Zafar Iqbal, Abdul Salam Bhuttavi, and other senior LeT commanders had the right to offer funeral prayers for killed militants. They were also closely involved in choosing or approving the militants sent to Kashmir or other parts of India.

=== Dasta Mohammad Bin Qasim ===
Indian agencies learned about Cheema for the first time in 1998 while investigating terrorists planning to attack Delhi. They discovered the multiple attacks Cheema was planning along with his LeT senior Zakiur Rehman Lakhvi, and Indian LeT commander Syed Abdul Karim Tunda. From 1997 to 1998, these three terrorists commanded the LeT's "Dasta Mohammad Bin Qasim" unit, which executed attacks in North India. At the Chelabandi LeT base in Muzaffarabad, Tunda met Cheema, Abu Dujana and Abdul Qadir, and learnt the process of making improvised explosive devices (IEDs) from them. The unit was mostly composed of Tanzim Islahul Muslimeen leaders, including Tunda, Jalees Ansari and Azam Ghauri. On the first anniversary of the Babri Masjid demolition in 1993, the unit set off multiple blasts in trains at Hyderabad, Indergarh, Surat, Lucknow and Gulbarga.

Sometime after 1995, Tunda was tasked with infiltrating LeT operatives into India through Bangladesh. Cheema initially gave him ₹25 to ₹30 lakhs for this purpose. However, Tunda said Cheema double-crossed him by creating his own group in India led by Saleem Junaid, and stopped giving him money. Tunda also said Cheema was excluded from LeT activities after Junaid was arrested and revealed the details of all LeT members in India.

Ansari was arrested while planning another round of bombings for the 1994 Republic Day events, and Ghauri escaped to Pakistan via Saudi Arabia. Tunda fled to Dhaka, and recruited the unit's field agents, assisted by the Bangladesh Islami Chhatra Shibir. On 7 March 2009, Abu Taher was arrested at Sealdah railway station in Kolkata. Taher was a close associate of Cheema and Tunda. Taher, along with Tunda and Ansari, carried out 40 blasts in North Indian cities from December 1996 to January 1997. 21 of these blasts occurred in Delhi, with the rest in Mumbai, Hyderabad, Panipat, Sonipat, Ludhiana, Kanpur and Varanasi. Ghauri arrived in India in 1998 and effected seven bombings, five in Hyderabad and two in nearby Matpalli (Raichur) and Nanded.

Cheema succeeded Lakhvi as the LeT commander of India operations. Cheema sent money to Saleem Junaid, an LeT agent in Hyderabad, who bought a Mitsubishi Fuso Canter light truck and used it for the business he set up as a cover cover. Among other things, the truck was used to transport RDX to Dehradun in July 1997, which was later placed on a military coach in a train going to Delhi. Other than Junaid, Cheema's Indian agents were Abdul Sattar, who created a terror module in Khurja; and Amir Khan, whose module had members in the states of Maharashtra, Uttar Pradesh and Haryana and the Indian capital Delhi. Junaid, Sattar and Khan were arrested between 1997 and 1998. Sattar was working on planting bombs in military vehicles and at Delhi Cantonment. He had requisitioned 200 kilograms (440 lb) of RDX and other weapons from Cheema, which didn't arrive because Junaid was arrested.

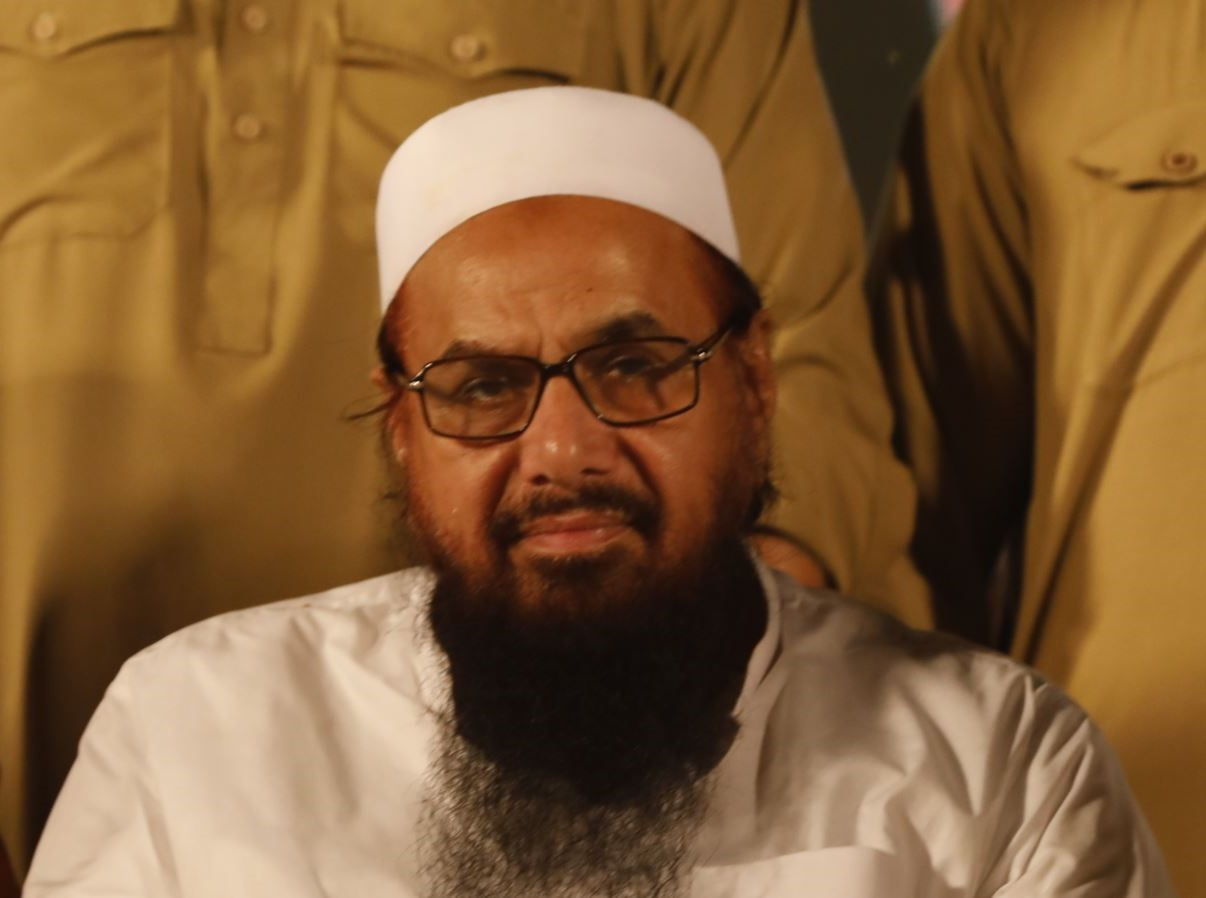
Lashkar-e-Taiba founder and leader Hafiz Saeed

In November 2002, LeT member Mohammad Azam was arrested in Hyderabad. In order to set off religious violence, Azam plotted to murder Hindu nationalists, including B. Narayana Reddy of Gaddiannaram, Ajay Kumar of Saidabad and, most notably, businessman and Vishva Hindu Parishad (VHP) leader G. Pulla Reddy. Azam was in touch with LeT commanders Tunda, Cheema and Fahadullah, who also sent him explosives. Also in November 2002, two men suspected to be Pakistani, aged 20 and 25, were killed after they attacked the Ansal Plaza mall in Delhi. The Delhi Police said they were constantly talking to Cheema during the attack by using satellite phones.

=== Activities in Gujarat ===
According to Indian police officer D. G. Vanzara, Cheema executed almost all the terror attacks in Gujarat after the 2002 Gujarat violence. Vanzara said Cheema was involved in terror since 1995 and his associate Abu Amjad was killed in a police encounter in 1998. Vanzara also said Cheema executed the 2006 Ahmedabad railway station bombing and created an LeT cell in Aurangabad with the intent to attack Gujarat. Cheema was also listed as a suspect in the 2007 Samjhauta Express bombings. Abu Qasam, who claimed to be a member of Cheema's unit, confessed he was planning to murder L. K. Advani, the Home Minister, and Keshubhai Patel, the Chief Minister of Gujarat. Qasam said he infiltrated into India at the India–Pakistan border in Jaisalmer, with assistance from the Pakistan Rangers.

=== Cooperation with other groups ===
In July 2001, LeT militant Muzammil (also known as Shahnawaz Hussain Bhatti) was arrested by the Border Security Force near Hajipir in Kutch. He helped Indian police retrieve 32 kilograms (71 lb) of RDX and other weapons hidden in the Rann of Kutch, and said he received them from Cheema. (Note: Other weapons hidden by Bhatti and recovered from the Rann of Kutch were two Type 56 assault rifles, 250 cartridges, 12 grenades, four timers and six detonators.) Police believe Bhatti trained in Pakistan in January 1993, and at the same time met Cheema and Aftab Ansari of the LeT and Ahmed Omar Saeed Sheikh of the Jaish-e-Mohammed (JeM). Police also speculate Cheema planned to smuggle arms and infiltrate members of a Kolkata module of the JeM through the India–Pakistan border in Gujarat. Bhatti, who was serving a life sentence pronounced in 2007, was imprisoned at Sabarmati Central Jail along with four other Pakistanis. The group were planning a jailbreak with assistance from Cheema's unit based in Sindh.

According to Indian intelligence agencies, LeT and the Khalistani organization Babbar Khalsa started cooperating in 2008 and had nearly 12 shared camps in Pakistan. These camps, located in Rawalpindi District and Karachi District, provided training to make IEDs and launch grenade attacks. Cheema allegedly supervised these camps, and managed their financing and recruitment. The ISI reportedly assisted the training operations at these camps. After his arrest, Tunda told police Cheema, Saeed; Wadhwa Singh and Ratandeep Singh of the Babbar Khalsa, and Dawood Ibrahim of the D-Company lived and closely cooperated in Karachi. Tunda further confessed to a failed attempt to bomb the 2010 Commonwealth Games in Delhi, planned along with the Babbar Khalsa.

Cheema, along with Asif Raza Khan and Ahmed Omar Saeed Sheikh of the JeM, created a terrorist module operating inside the Harkat-ul-Jihad al-Islami. The module planned to kidnap Indian cricketers Sachin Tendulkar and Sourav Ganguly for ransom, kill Indian president A. P. J. Abdul Kalam when he visited Patna in 2001, and also plant bombs at the Bhabha Atomic Research Centre (BARC) in Mumbai. The members of the module were arrested in the first three months of 2001. (Note: The members of the module were three Pakistanis: Tariq Mohammed, Ashfaq Ahmed and Ashad Khan; three Indians: Mufti Israr, Ghulam Qadir Bhatt and Ghulam Mohd. Dar; and their leader Jalaluddin, who was Bangladeshi.) LeT western India commander Faisal Shaikh was also involved in the plot to bomb BARC, according to his confession. Faisal said he received orders from Cheema to reconnoiter the BARC facility and its security to locate gaps which could be exploited for an attack.

=== 2001 Partha Roy Burman kidnapping ===
In July 2001, Partha Roy Burman, the chairman of Indian footwear company Khadim's, was kidnapped and released only after his ransom was paid. The kidnapping was executed by Dubai-based gangster Aftab Ansari, assisted by Asif Raza Khan of the Students' Islamic Movement of India (SIMI). In turn, Khan solicited help from Cheema and Ahmed Omar Saeed Sheikh after meeting them in Karachi. They struck a deal to supply the arms and ammunition, and Ansari in turn would pay them a fixed share of the ransom. Sheikh received his share of the 4 crore ransom (equivalent to ₹152,643,745 in 2023); and sent part of it to Mohamed Atta, who was one of the hijackers in the September 11 attacks. Ashaddudin (alias Shaukat), imprisoned for his role in the kidnapping, was lodged at Alipore Central Jail in Kolkata, and there met Abdul Subhan Qureshi, the LeT commander for northern India. Colluding with Cheema and the Indian Mujahideen's founder, they were planning to bomb Delhi before the Delhi Police arrested Qureshi.

=== Activities from 2004 to 2005 ===
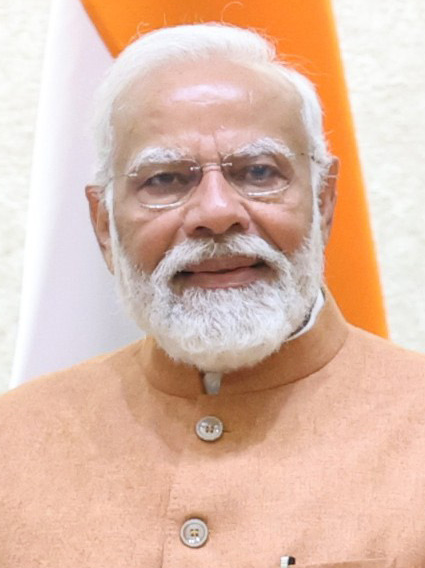
Narendra Modi, the Chief Minister of Gujarat and later the Prime Minister of India, whom Cheema planned to assassinate through Ishrat Jahan

Cheema's protégé Faisal Shaikh reportedly confessed to planning the assassination attempt on Narendra Modi, the Chief Minister of Gujarat and later the Prime Minister of India. Faisal said he did so based on orders issued by Cheema. On 16 November 2004, four of the assassins sent by Faisal, including Ishrat Jahan, were killed by the Ahmedabad Police. Faisal attempted to secure aid for Jahan's family, and personally dispatched Ehtesham Siddiqui with money for the family. Faisal and Cheema also established three terror cells in the cities of Nashik and Nagpur in Maharashtra, which were busted after the 2006 Mumbai bombings. The LeT reportedly created these cells after the growth of Hindu organizations in the region led by Pragya Singh Thakur and Shrikant Purohit. The cells in the two cities were commanded by Cheema and Riyaz Bhatkal of the Indian Mujahideen.

=== 2005 IISc shooting ===
For the 2005 Indian Institute of Science shooting in Bengaluru, Cheema sent trained fedayeen (suicide attackers), routing them to LeT bases in India via Kathmandu. Razaullah Nizamani, also known as Abu Saifullah Khalid, reported to Cheema. Nizamani was the one who planned and facilitated the attack, and perhaps himself went to Nepal to arrange the hideout for the incoming attackers. During the attack, Indian mathematician Munish Chander Puri was killed. Nizamani also planned the failed 2006 attack on the Nagpur headquarters of the Hindu nationalist organization, the Rashtriya Swayamsevak Sangh.

=== 2006 Delhi module arrests ===
Two LeT members arrested in Delhi on 8 May 2006 said they met Cheema in Bahawalpur, and then joined his terror camp Al Aqsa, located in Muzaffarabad in Pakistan administered Kashmir. The two were Feroze Abdul Latif Ghaswala from Mumbai and Mohammed Ali Chhipa from Ahmedabad. They were arrested on arrival at the Hazrat Nizamuddin railway station, with 4 kilograms (8.8 lb) of RDX and ₹50,000 cash (equivalent to ₹190,805 in 2023) found on their person. While training with the Harkat-ul-Jihad-al-Islami Bangladesh in 2004, Ghaswala met Cheema, who offered him an invitation to visit Pakistan. At Bahawalpur in June 2006, Ghaswala met Cheema and Mohammed Iqbal (alias Abu Hamza). Chhipa was also introduced to Cheema in Bahawalpur, where he and Ghaswala learned how to handle high-quality explosive material, bombs and timers. After their arrest, the two disclosed they were scheduled to convey the weapons to Mohammad Iqbal, also known as Abu Hamza, a Bahawalpur native; Hamza was killed in a shootout with police on the same day. (Note: At Hamza's Ballabhgarh address, police found two AK-56 rifles, six magazines, 180 cartridges, 10 grenades, 8 kilograms (18 lb) of PETN explosives, three litres of nitric acid, one litre of glycerine, 3 kilograms (6.6 lb) of urea, a Thuraya satellite phone and a computer.)

=== 2006 Aurangabad arms bust ===
On 6 May 2006, a Tata Sumo with three male occupants was seized on the Chandwad–Manmad Highway. 16 AK-47 rifles, 3,200 cartridges, 50 hand grenades and 43 kilograms (95 lb) of RDX were recovered from the vehicle. Abu Jundal, who was driving a Tata Indica in the convoy, escaped to Malegaon and then fled to Pakistan. The judgment in the case said the weapons were arranged for killing Modi and VHP leader Pravin Togadia. Cheema, Rahil Abdul Rehman Sheikh, Abu Jundal and Fayaz Kagzi reportedly smuggled the arms and ammunitions captured in Aurangabad. Kagzi was introduced to Cheema at the Bahawalpur camp in May 2006. Sheikh was the one who supervised all contact between Cheema and LeT modules in Gujarat, Maharashtra and Delhi.

=== 2007 Bengaluru module arrests ===
On 5 January 2007, Bengaluru Police detained Bilal Ahmed Kota (also known as Imran Jalal), and retrieved an AK-47, 200 rounds and five hand grenades from his rented home in Hospet. Kota was planning to target technology companies, the Karnataka secretariat, Bengaluru Airport, and other essential infrastructure in the city. In October 2016, Kota was awarded life imprisonment. The members of the module were Basharat and Kota from Kashmir, Rajesh from Pune; and Cheema, Khalid and Alqama (also known as Lala Khan) from Pakistan. Except Kota, the other accused were absconding at the time of the judgment. Kota trained in Muzaffarabad from 1995 to 1999, and returned to Pakistan in 2005, where he was ordered to research potential targets.

== 2006 Mumbai train bombings ==
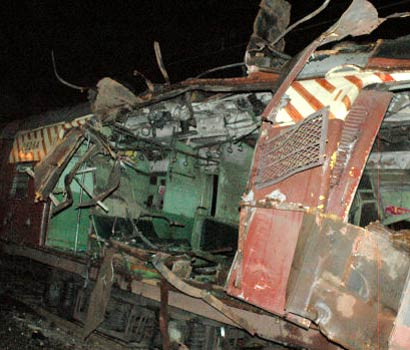
One of the many Mumbai local trains damaged by the 2006 Mumbai train bombings planned by Cheema

An Interpol red corner notice revealed Rizwan Dawrey received funds from Cheema and sent them to India via Saudi Arabia through hawala networks. These funds were used in the 2006 Mumbai train bombings. According to a Press Trust of India report, Cheema was the LeT commander who approved and supervised the bombings, and also arranged for SIMI members to attend training camps in Pakistan. On 27 July 2006, the Mumbai Police arrested Faisal Shaikh, the LeT commander in west India, and his brother Muzzammil Shaikh; the two executed the Mumbai bombings and said they were initiated into terror by Cheema.

Faisal primarily worked for Cheema, and underwent arms training with him in Pakistan in 1999. As ordered by Cheema, Faisal arranged for Muzzammil, Unani doctor Tanvir Ansari, Sohail Shaikh and Zameer Shaikh to travel to Pakistan through Tehran. Others who traveled through Iran to Pakistan for training between 2001 and 2005 were Kamal Ansari and Shaikh Mohd. Ali. According to the Mumbai Anti-Terrorism Squad (ATS), Cheema would send Faisal money ranging from ₹10,00,000 (equivalent to ₹3,816,094 in 2023) to ₹12,00,000 (equivalent to ₹4,579,312 in 2023) every year. The ATS further said the total spending for the bombings was ₹20,00,000 (equivalent to ₹7,632,187 in 2023).

At the training camp in Bahawalpur, Faisal said Cheema was the one who arranged for the ISI Director General, Major General Hamid Gul, and Brigadier Riazullah Khan Chibb and Colonel Rafiq to visit the Bahawalpur camp. They were brought to inculcate the terrorists training there in jihad. Faisal said Cheema often visited the LeT camps in Karachi and Lahore as well. Cheema's favorite trainee was Faisal, who desired to remain in Pakistan but Cheema told him he had to execute the mission in India. Faisal said Cheema had a library with materials on violence against Muslims, did not tolerate those who asked questions and rebuked them to set an example for the other trainees. Cheema ordered Tanvir Ansari to crawl across the training ground when he questioned why Mumbai was the target and not Ahmedabad. Ansari was also expelled from the camp in the middle of his 21-day course.

Faisal told Lashkar commander Abdul Rehman Makki he wished to work with Cheema in 2002, who told him to enlist more Indians and send them to Pakistan for training. Cheema provided Faisal with ₹20,000 (equivalent to ₹76,322 in 2023) to ₹25,000 (equivalent to ₹95,402 in 2023) for his daily spending. Four months after Faisal entered India through the Wagah border and went to Pune for enlisting Indians, Cheema transferred ₹180,000 (equivalent to ₹686,897 in 2023) over hawala channels. The LeT had to spend ₹50,000 (equivalent to ₹190,805 in 2023) for each member enlisted, which included their training and their travel to Bahawalpur through Iran. In 2003, Faisal emigrated to Saudi Arabia for work, and informed Cheema he hoped to visit Pakistan again.

In March 2004, Faisal arrived at the Bahawalpur base via Dubai, and trained there for six months. For Faisal's return to India, again through Dubai, Cheema supplied a fake passport in the name of Mohammed Akhtar. After Faisal arrived in Mumbai, he was constantly communicating with Cheema, who told him to execute a significant attack. Faisal therefore reconnoitered the World Trade Centre, Bombay Stock Exchange, Mahalakshmi Temple, Siddhivinayak Temple, local train stations and multiple malls. Faisal chose local railway stations and trains for the attack as they were crowded and had limited security. The western line of the Mumbai trains was chosen as it was mostly used by Gujarati residents, against whom revenge had to be taken for the 2002 Gujarat riots. A few of the accused said Cheema himself stayed in Mumbai for some time before the bombings. Cheema sent 11,200 Saudi riyals to Faisal for executing the blasts, and 15,000 riyals for compensating the participants after the blasts.

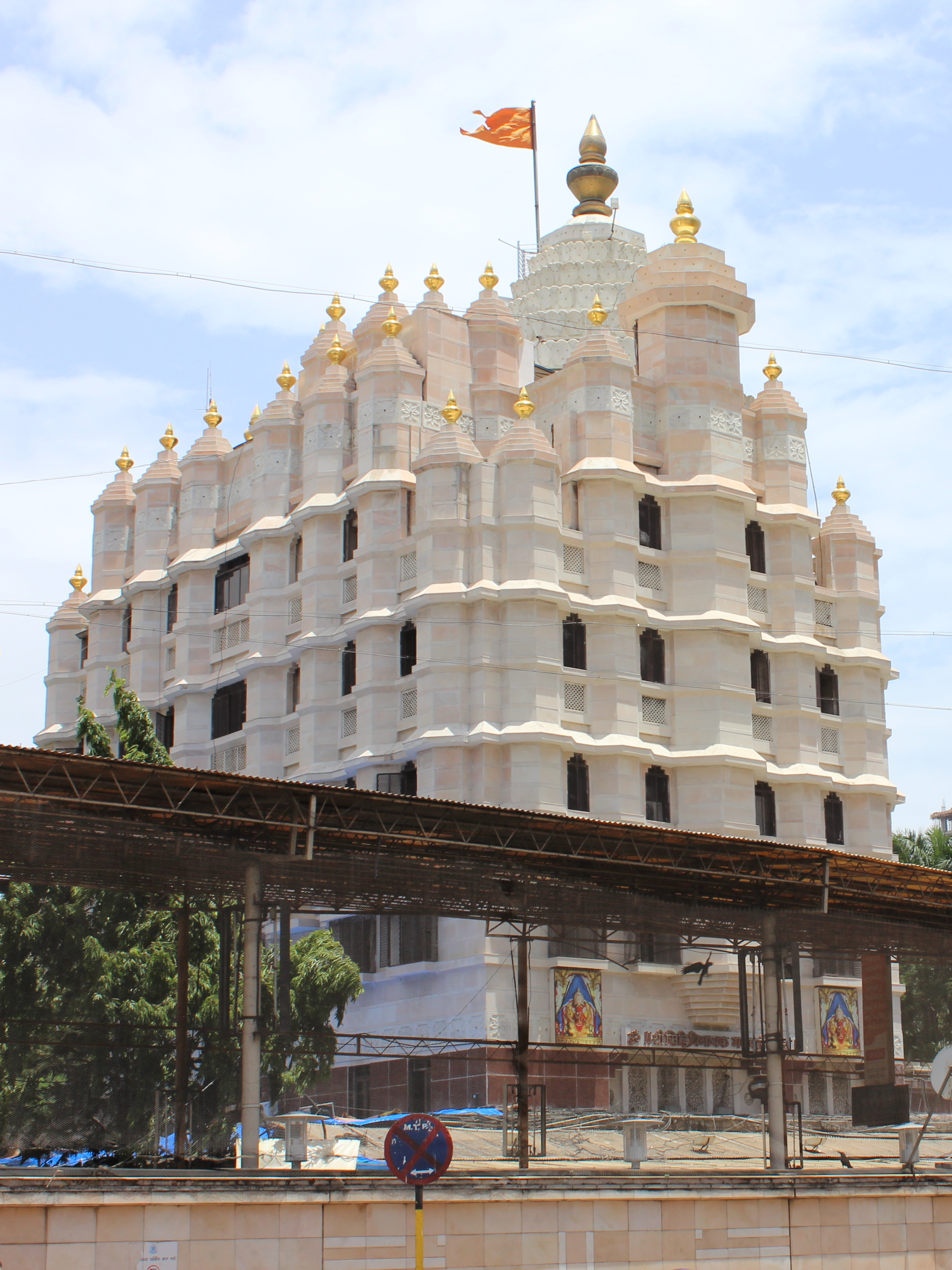
The Siddhivinayak Temple, Mumbai, one of the locations surveyed by Faisal Shaikh as a potential target

In a confession to Indian authorities, Faisal, Tanvir Ansari and Muzzammil Shaikh claimed they trained under Egyptian terrorist and 9/11 attacker Mohamed Atta in 2000 at an LeT camp in Muzaffarabad. They also claimed the attack was financed by the al-Qaeda and executed by the LeT. Ajit Doval, the Director of the Intelligence Bureau and later the National Security Advisor, said the financing claim was possible but the execution was done by the LeT. Doval further said Cheema had strong associations with the al-Qaeda and was responsible for the organization's relationship with the LeT. After the Aurangabad arms bust, the LeT led by Cheema and Lakhvi modified its eligibility for attackers. Earlier, SIMI members were preferred as they were already indoctrinated; all of the 24 people arrested in the Aurangabad case were SIMI cadre. Thereafter, the LeT mandated weapons and explosives training in Pakistan for all of its future attackers. They also sent 11 Pakistanis as supervisors for the Indian recruits.

According to the Indian prosecution in the case, ten Pakistanis and two Indian residents of Pakistan arrived in Mumbai in May 2006 to execute the bombings. (Note: Six Pakistanis, namely Sabir, Abu Bakr, Kasam Ali, Ammu Jaan, Ehsanullah and Abu Hasan infiltrated into India in May through the Bangladesh-India border with the help of Kolkata resident Mohammed Majid, and then took a train from Kolkata to Mumbai. Ehsanullah reportedly had 15 kilograms (33 lb) of RDX explosives with him. Two Pakistanis Salim and Abu Umed, and Abdul Razzak and Sohail Shaikh, two Indian residents in Pakistan infiltrated through the India-Pakistan border in the Kutch region. Kamal Ansari, an accused in the bombings, also brought over two Pakistani nationals Aslam and Hafizullah via the India-Nepal border. These details are based on the arguments made by the Indian prosecution in the case.) The defense lawyers alleged the 12 accused were just the "foot soldiers" for Cheema and the bombings were probably executed by the Indian Mujahideen (IM). Judge Yatin Shinde, who tried the case in 2015, said the IM's patters were not observed in the case. Shinde further stated the 12 weren't "foot soldiers" for Cheema, instead, they established their own module willingly, using their experience in the SIMI. On 22 July 2025, the Bombay High Court acquitted all 12 accused in the Mumbai bombings case. The court said the prosecution hadn't proved collusion between them and Cheema because their call detail records (CDRs) were not provided by the prosecution, and when the CDRs were provided by the defense, the prosecution failed to meaningfully prove collaboration between Cheema and the accused.

== 2008 Mumbai attacks ==
Cheema probably planned and supervised the 1 January 2008 attack on a Central Reserve Police Force base in Rampur, Uttar Pradesh. Sabahuddin Ahmed and Faheem Ansari, who executed the attack, said they talked to Cheema while carrying out the attack. Anonymous Intelligence Bureau officials said Cheema was not involved in the 2008 Mumbai attacks, because he withdrew from his more active role four months before the attack due to diabetes. They said Cheema was succeeded in his role by Abu Qama, and was being informed about the plot when potential targets were reconnoitered by LeT members. Meanwhile, Cheema's new charge was reportedly supervising recruits and indoctrinating them. Other sources said Cheema was succeeded by Yousuf Muzammil Butt, while he returned to his role as an Islamic studies teacher at the Government Degree College Jaranwala.

According to other sources, Cheema was the operations advisor to Lakhvi at the time of the Mumbai attacks. The control room was located in the Quaidabad area of Karachi, somewhere between Malir Cantonment and Jinnah International Airport. The handlers present at the control room were reportedly Cheema, Lakhvi, Butt, Sajid Mir, Abu Jundal and Zarrar Shah. Abu Jundal told Indian agencies Mir and Cheema were in the control room for all four days of the attack.

=== Aftermath ===
In 2008, two LeT terrorists, who had sailed to Mumbai from Karachi in 2007, were arrested in Rajouri. The two, Abdul Majid Arain from Sindh and Jameel Ahmed Awan from Abbottabad, revealed they were influenced by the speeches of Saeed and Cheema, who instigated them to combat atrocities against Muslims in Kashmir and other parts of India. On 30 January 2009, the Lahore Police arrested three Pakistanis who it claimed were Indian spies. The Lahore Police further said they had executed multiple failed attacks against Cheema at his Bahawalpur home, and were planning to carry out many more.

On 25 February 2010, Nirupama Rao, India's Foreign Secretary at the time, sent a dossier to Salman Bashir, Pakistan's Foreign Secretary. It included details on terrorists including Cheema, Nasr Javed, Ilyas Kashmiri and others. In the dossiers, Cheema's address was listed as a bungalow in Hashmi Colony on Multan road in Bahawalpur. LeT terrorists in Indian custody revealed he had a lab there to administer explosives training. On 28 March 2011, India released its list of the 49 most wanted terrorists, and 18 of them were Pakistani citizens. Cheema was listed at number 30.

=== US trial ===
On 19 November 2010, relatives of Gavriel Holtzberg and his wife filed a lawsuit against the ISI and LeT for their role in the Mumbai attacks. On 24 November, a New York district court summoned Cheema, Saeed, Lakhvi and Sajid Mir of the LeT; and Major Samir Ali, Major Iqbal, Ahmad Shuja Pasha and Nadeem Taj of the ISI. The lawsuit claimed the "LeT, Saeed, Lakhvi, Cheema and Mir" were liable to pay more than $75,000 in damages to the living relatives of those killed in the attacks. It was the first time an American court had summoned the ISI. James Kreindler of Kreindler & Kreindler was the attorney for the victims' families.

On 30 and 31 October 2014, nine American and Israeli victims and their families filed for a jury trial and default judgment against the LeT and its commanders before the United States District Court for the Eastern District of New York. They also claimed they were owed $688 million in damages by the LeT. This lawsuit did not include the ISI or its officials, after the United States Department of State said they enjoyed diplomatic immunity. The victims were represented by Kreindler and Andrew J. Maloney. On 5 July 2016, the court found Cheema and Saeed had actual notice of the complaints against them. The court ruled Cheema's scienter (intent) was proven when he trained and oversaw the attackers, and it was immaterial whether he ordered only the attackers at the Taj Mahal Palace Hotel.

=== Sanctions ===
On 4 November 2010, the United States Department of the Treasury announced sanctions against him just before President Barack Obama's visit to India. He was sanctioned as a Specially Designated Global Terrorist under the Specially Designated Nationals and Blocked Persons List by the Office of Foreign Assets Control. His addresses were listed in Islamabad, Muzaffarabad and Bahawalpur. On 20 January 2010, a US political officer informed United Nations (UN) officials about the proposed sanctions by the ISIL (Da'esh) and Al-Qaida Sanctions Committee against Cheema, Makki and Jaish-e-Mohammed leader Masood Azhar. The US officer also requested China to drop its veto. Chinese official Shen Yinyin noted China hadn't replied to additional information about the three provided in October 2009.

In May 2009, the United Kingdom agreed with China on the need for more information before the three could be sanctioned. On 21 August 2009, the US Embassy in Beijing sent a diplomatic cable, quoting the Chinese Foreign Ministry saying it didn't have enough evidence to approve sanctions against the three. Yinyin said Chinese authorities requested the Indian government to provide more information, but it said the evidence already submitted was adequate. In another cable, the State Department opined China was disapproving sanctions on behalf of Pakistan. In July 2011, at a counter terrorism dialogue with India, China reiterated its stance against UN sanctions on Cheema, Makki and Azhar.

== Death ==
Cheema reportedly died from a heart attack in Pakistan on 28 February 2024, at the age of 70. Cheema's funeral was held at Malkhanwala village in Faisalabad.

Cheema was portrayed by Vinod Tharani in the 2025 Indian spy thriller film Dhurandhar and its sequel Dhurandhar: The Revenge (2026).

== Sources ==
=== Books ===
- Fair, C. Christine (2018). In Their Own Words: Understanding Lashkar-e-Tayyaba. Oxford and New York: Oxford University Press. doi:10.1093/oso/9780190909482.001.0001. ISBN 9780190062033.

=== Government and court documents ===
- "CHEEMA, Azam". Sanctions Search, Office of Foreign Asset Control. Archived from the original on 19 November 2023.
- Chroman v. Lashkar-e-Taiba et al. (NYED 5 July 2016), Text, archived from the original on 7 December 2025.
- Ehtesham Qutubuddin Siddique vs The State Of Maharashtra (Mumbai HC 21 July 2025), Text, archived from the original on 10 January 2026.
- Swami, Praveen (2025). Interrogation Report of Sayeed Abdul Karim 'Tunda' @ Abdul Quddus (In Pak) @ Maulvi @ Anwar (In Bangladesh) @ Babaji (In LeT) @ Hakim Ji, Arrested By Delhi Police Special Cell On 17 Aug 2013 (Report) – via Scribd.
- "Treasury Targets Pakistan-Based Terrorist Organizations Lashkar-E Tayyiba and Jaish-E Mohammed". United States Department of the Treasury. 7 November 2010. Archived from the original on 9 November 2010.

=== Research papers ===
- Chansoria, Monika (October 2012). India and China: Assessing the Need to Strengthen Bilateral Confidence Building Measures (PDF) (Report). Albuquerque, New Mexico: Sandia National Laboratories. OSTI 1059467. Archived (PDF) from the original on 26 March 2025.
- Roul, Animesh (30 October 2010). "A Portrait of Azam Cheema: LeT's India Strategist". Militant Leadership Monitor. 1 (11). Jamestown Foundation. Archived from the original on 22 December 2025.
- Tankel, Stephen (2014). The Indian Jihadist Movement: Evolution and Dynamics (PDF) (Report). Institute for National Strategic Studies, National Defense University. Archived (PDF) from the original on 25 April 2025.

=== News articles ===
- Bose, Mrityunjay (21 July 2025). "Mumbai train blasts: As HC acquits all accused, a look back at mastermind Azam Cheema's role". Deccan Herald. Archived from the original on 14 August 2025.
- "12 guilty, 8 acquitted in 2006 Aurangabad arms haul case". Business Standard. Indo-Asian News Service. 28 July 2016. Archived from the original on 23 September 2019.
- "LeT operative gets lifer for plotting terror attacks in Bengaluru". Business Standard. Indo-Asian News Service. 5 October 2016. Archived from the original on 6 October 2016.
- Chauhan, Neeraj (28 June 2012). "With sacred threads, Abu Jundal tried to colour 26/11 saffron". The Times of India. Archived from the original on 6 December 2024.
- Chauhan, Neeraj (18 August 2013). "A Saeed lookalike, he plotted CWG blast". The Times of India. Archived from the original on 28 December 2025.
- "U.S. Treasury targets Pakistani militants". CNN. 4 November 2010. Archived from the original on 20 May 2023.
- Dayal, Prashant (28 May 2008). "How can A'bad be safe in his hands?". The Times of India.
- "26/11 Mumbai attacks: Victims seek $688 mn from perpetrators of terror assault". Firstpost. Press Trust of India. 11 November 2014. Archived from the original on 27 December 2014.
- Gaikwad, Rahi (23 September 2015). "Death sought for 8 convicts in 7/11 case". The Hindu. Archived from the original on 3 March 2024.
- Ghosh, Dwaipayan (31 July 2014). "Plot to bomb Delhi hatched in Alipore jail". The Times of India. Archived from the original on 2 August 2014.
- Gupta, Shishir (12 March 2010). "The Delhi Dossier". The Indian Express.
- Gupta, Shishir (10 May 2011). "5 of its Army majors are India's most-wanted from Pakistan". The Indian Express.
- Gupta, Shishir (19 August 2013). "LeT chief Saeed sent me to terror camps: Tunda". Hindustan Times. Archived from the original on 27 December 2025.
- "Interpol warrant against blast accused". Hindustan Times. Press Trust of India. 27 May 2007. Archived from the original on 23 December 2025.
- Jha, Raj Shekhar (2 March 2024). "LeT intel chief Cheema, 26/11 key conspirator, dies in Pakistan". The Times of India. Archived from the original on 8 October 2025.
- Kanth, Pratyush; Srivastava, Siddharth (5 November 2002). "Delhi Police under fire after Ansal Plaza shootout". The Times of India. Archived from the original on 3 November 2009.
- Kumar, Shiv (21 September 2006). "Iran, Pakistan links in Mumbai train blasts". The Tribune India. Archived from the original on 9 September 2025.
- Misra, Leena (12 January 2002). "Muzamil confesses to links with slain Razakhan". The Times of India. Archived from the original on 25 December 2025.
- Mitra, Sumit; Chakravarty, Sayantan; Ghosh, Labonita (14 January 2002). "Partha Roy Burman abduction case reveals world of organised crime links with jehadis". India Today.
- Mukherjee, Sourav (31 July 2006). "'Mastermind' traced to Gujarat". The Times of India. Archived from the original on 25 December 2025.
- "How deep are Qaeda roots in India?". News18. 22 September 2006.
- Nanjappa, Vicky (19 January 2009). "Azam Cheema stepped down 4 months before 26/11". Rediff.com. Archived from the original on 22 March 2025.
- Nanjappa, Vicky (14 September 2010). "LeT eyes Nashik as the next terror hub". Rediff.com. Archived from the original on 28 December 2025.
- Padmanabhan, Mukund (7 June 2011). "China's 'hold' stopped designation of LeT, Jaish leaders". The Hindu. Archived from the original on 17 June 2021.
- Pandit, M. Saleem (5 October 2006). "Terror trainer Cheema is LeT intel chief". The Times of India. Archived from the original on 3 November 2012.
- Reddy, T. Sunil (24 November 2002). "LeT planned to kill Pulla Reddy: Intelligence agencies". The Times of India. Archived from the original on 17 September 2021.
- "Gujarat police bust ISI plot to assassinate Advani, Keshubhai". Rediff.com. United News of India. 13 October 1998. Archived from the original on 28 December 2025.
- "Life terms for 15 for 1993 serial train blasts". Rediff.com. Press Trust of India. 28 February 2004. Archived from the original on 19 May 2024.
- "LeT, Babbar Khalsa join hands: Intelligence agencies". Rediff.com. 14 April 2008. Archived from the original on 10 December 2019.
- Sabarwal, Harshit (1 March 2024). "LeT's Azam Cheema, key conspirator of 26/11 Mumbai attacks, dies in Pakistan: Reports". WION News. Archived from the original on 16 March 2025.
- Samanta, Pranab Dhal (31 May 2009). "Delhi stunned: UK & China stall move to blacklist Masood Azhar". The Indian Express. Archived from the original on 18 December 2021.
- Samervel, Rebecca (22 July 2025). "11/7 Mumbai train bombings: MCOCA court had rejected defence's claims of custodial torture & IM hand". The Times of India. Archived from the original on 27 October 2025.
- Shaikh, Zeeshan (22 July 2025). "Mumbai train blasts case: What happened to the Pakistan nationals who were accused?". The Indian Express. Archived from the original on 27 July 2025.
- Sharan, Abhishek (22 July 2006). "More dirt on medicine man". Hindustan Times. Archived from the original on 25 July 2021.
- Sharan, Abhishek (29 July 2006). "LeT wanted to bomb BARC: Cops". Hindustan Times. Archived from the original on 27 December 2025.
- Sharan, Abhishek (22 October 2006). "Changing face of terrorists". Hindustan Times. Archived from the original on 27 December 2025.
- Sharan, Abhishek (29 October 2006). "7/11 brain admits to plotting failed hit on Modi". Hindustan Times. Archived from the original on 27 December 2025.
- Singh, Anil (6 October 2006). "ISI spent Rs 20 lakh on 7/11 blasts: ATS". The Times of India. Archived from the original on 23 March 2021.
- Swami, Praveen (13 May 2000). "The 'Liberation' of Hyderabad". Frontline, The Hindu. Archived from the original on 5 December 2022.
- Swami, Praveen (2 February 2002). "Disappearing act". Frontline, The Hindu. Archived from the original on 20 May 2022.
- Swami, Praveen (20 October 2006). "In the shadows". The Hindu. Archived from the original on 6 January 2024.
- Swami, Praveen (29 December 2006). "Missing evidence". The Hindu. Archived from the original on 23 December 2025.
- Swami, Praveen (3 June 2025). "Killing of Lashkar's Razaullah Nizamani delivers justice for Bengaluru terror attack, 20 years on". The Print. Archived from the original on 24 December 2025.
- Thakur, Pradeep (3 June 2015). "Coast Guard freed LeT men after taking cash". The Times of India. Archived from the original on 14 August 2024.
- "U.S. court summons ISI chief". The Hindu. Press Trust of India. 24 November 2010. Archived from the original on 9 November 2020.
- "244326: China requested to drop UN 1267 hold on Makki, Cheema and Azhar Alvi". The Hindu. 7 June 2011. Archived from the original on 7 December 2021.
- "Three Indian spies arrested in Lahore". The Nation. 30 January 2009. Archived from the original on 1 January 2026.
- "US court summons ISI chief". The New Indian Express. 16 May 2012. Archived from the original on 23 December 2025.
- "More explosives seized from Hamza hideout". The Times of India. 10 May 2006. Archived from the original on 25 December 2025.
- "'7/11: Local trains were easy targets'". The Times of India. 17 December 2006. Archived from the original on 25 December 2025.
- "Interpol issues red corner notice against 7/11 suspect". The Times of India. 17 April 2007. Archived from the original on 23 December 2025.
- "Year after: As 7/11 trial begins, prime suspect still at large". The Times of India. 8 July 2007. Archived from the original on 25 December 2025.
- "Sachin, Ganguly plotters tried to kill Kalam". The Times of India. Press Trust of India. 9 February 2009. Archived from the original on 23 January 2010.
- "Top Lashkar bomber held in Kolkata". The Times of India. 7 March 2009.
- "5 Pak militants held, RDX, PETN seized". The Tribune India. 1 August 1998. Archived from the original on 16 July 2025.
- "President's Medal for Delhi Police special cell". The Tribune India. 25 January 2008. Archived from the original on 21 March 2025.
