= Abdul Salam Bhuttavi =

Pakistani terrorist and Islamic scholar (1940s–2023)

Hafiz Abdul Salam Bhuttavi
- Born: 1940s
- Died: March 29, 2023; District Jail Sheikhupura, Punjab, Pakistan
- Education: Jamia Salafia, Faisalabad; Jamia Mohammadia, Okara
- Years active: 1980s–2023
- Organization: Lashkar-e-Taiba
- Criminal charges: Terror financing Anti-Terrorism Act 1997
- Penalty: 16.5 years in prison PKR 170,000 in fines
- Accomplices: Hafiz Saeed; Abdul Rehman Makki
Abdul Salam Bhuttavi
- Military career
- Conflicts: Soviet-Afghan War; Kashmir conflict; Insurgency in Jammu and Kashmir; 2008 Mumbai attacks

Hafiz Abdul Salam Bhuttavi (1940s–29 May 2023) was a Pakistani Islamic scholar and militant. He was a founding member and second-in-command of the Lashkar-e-Taiba (LeT) along with Hafiz Saeed.

== Early life and education ==
According to the Interpol notice against him, Bhuttavi was born in 1940 in Gujranwala District of Punjab, Pakistan. Other sources state he was born on 27 August 1946 in Pattoki city in Kasur District, to a family from Bhutto village in Depalpur Tehsil, Okara District. Notably, Ajmal Kasab also belonged to the same district. Bhuttavi studied in school till his matriculation, and simultaneously started his religious education by becoming a Hafiz (person who has memorized the Quran). He studied Arabic, Persian, medicine and anatomy at Jamia Salafia, Faisalabad and Jamia Muhammadia in Okara. At the Jamia Salafia, his teachers were Sufi Muhammad Sarwar, Hafiz Muhammad Gondalvi, Hafiz Abdullah Baddomalhvi, Maulana Sharifullah Swati and Maulana Sadiq Khalil.

Bhuttavi's classmate at the Jamia Salafia in 1961 was Ehsan Elahi Zaheer, the founder of the Markazi Jamiat Ahle Hadith organization. Bhuttavi reportedly completed the eight year long Dars-i Nizami curriculum in three years. He also enrolled briefly at the Jamia Ashrafia in Lahore, but dropped out after the teachers there accepted Ahmadiyya students. Bhuttavi also studied at the Dar al-Hadith in Okara, and the Madrasa Tajweed al-Quran in Lahore. At the latter school, he was taught by Muhammad Fazal Karim, and his classmate was Maulana Bashir Ahmad Sialvi.

Bhuttavi began his career as a teacher in 1966 by teaching the Sahih al-Bukhari and other Hadith compilations. He taught at the Jamia Muhammadia in Gujranwala for almost 27 years, from 1966 to April 1992, before he resigned to join the Jamaat-ud-Dawa. Bhuttavi also taught at the Jamia Tadaseed Al-Quran Wa Hadith in Rawalpindi for one year. He married four times, and had one daughter and four sons. The latter were all Hafiz of the Quran and teachers of the Dars-i Nizami.

== Career ==
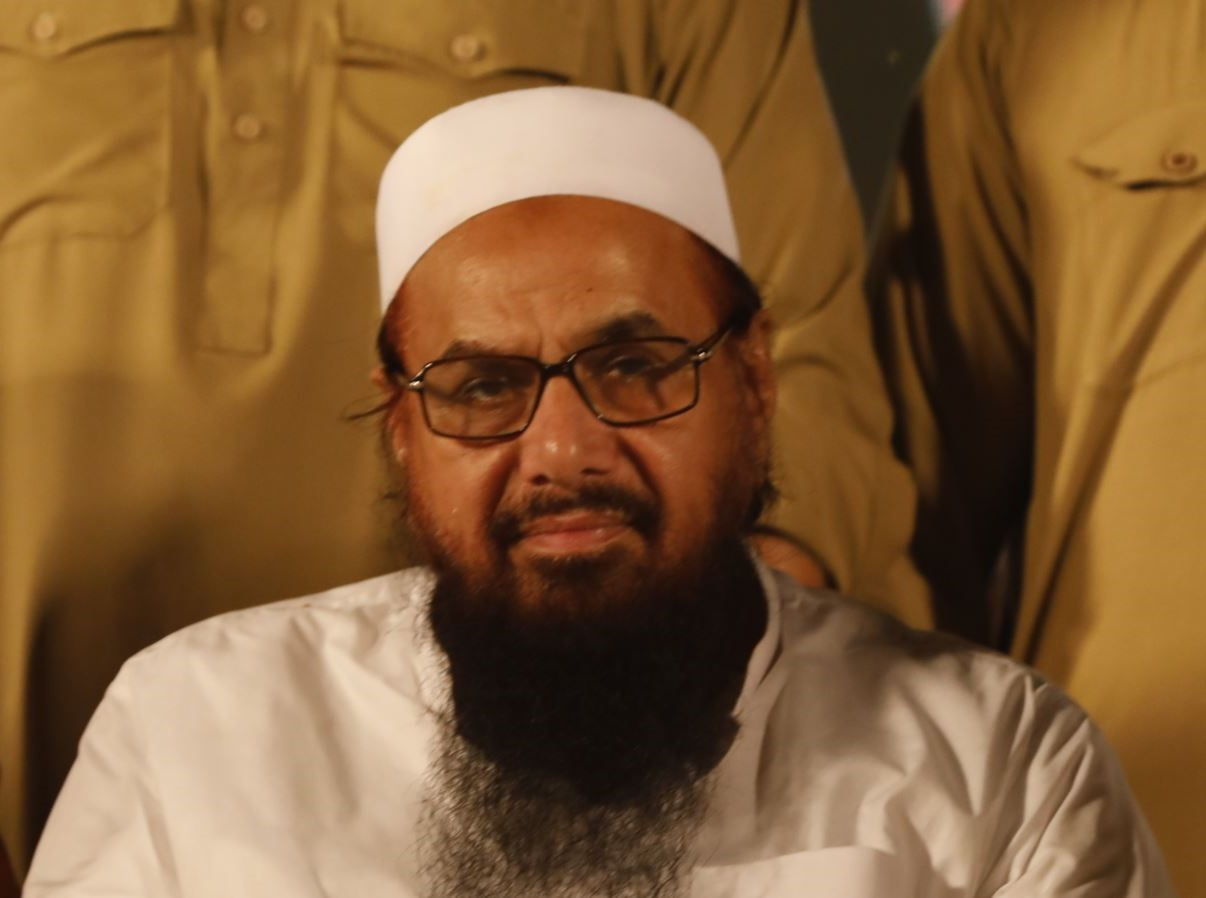
Lashkar-e-Taiba chief and founder Hafiz Saeed

In the 1980s, Bhuttavi went to Afghanistan to fight in the Soviet–Afghan War. There, he met Hafiz Saeed, who was then a lecturer at the University of Engineering and Technology, Lahore. In 1987, Bhuttavi and Saeed established the Lashkar-e-Taiba (LeT) as the armed wing of the Markaz Dawa-wal-Irshad, which later became the Jamaat-ud-Dawa. Bhuttavi was the second-in-command of the LeT. He was involved in many militant attacks in the state of Jammu and Kashmir. From 1992 to 2019, he commanded the LeT headquarters in Muridke before the Pakistani government took over. He notably taught Zakiur Rehman Lakhvi and his brother Khaliqur Rehman at the Muridke seminary.

Bhuttavi was appointed the temporary emir (chief) of the LeT at least two times when Saeed was in prison, first in May 2002, and then from November 2008 to June 2009 because of the 2008 Mumbai attacks. In 2002, he was assigned the task of setting up an LeT base in Lahore. Bhuttavi was the LeT's foremost scholar; he gave sermons to LeT commanders and operatives, and issued fatwas affirming LeT activities. He also motivated the Mumbai attackers through his teachings on the benefits of becoming a martyr. Bhuttavi was also in charge of administrating the LeT's madrasa (Islamic school) network, and 150 of its seminaries. Bhuttavi, Saeed, Azam Cheema, Abdul Rehman Makki, Zafar Iqbal, and other senior LeT commanders had the rights to offer funeral prayers for killed militants. They were also closely involved in choosing or permitting the militants sent to Kashmir or other parts of India.

Bhuttavi and Zafar Iqbal were sanctioned on 28 September 2011 by the United States Department of the Treasury using its powers under Executive Order 13224. According to David S. Cohen, the Under Secretary of the Treasury for Terrorism and Financial Intelligence at the time, the two were involved in LeT's financing and recruitment since 1991. The two were also added to the Specially Designated Nationals and Blocked Persons List by the Office of Foreign Assets Control. Bhuttavi was sanctioned on 14 March 2012 by the ISIL (Da'esh) and Al-Qaida Sanctions Committee of the United Nations Security Council (UNSC). Bhuttavi was also sanctioned by Belgium, Ukraine, Moldova, Argentina, the United Kingdom, South Africa, Israel, Australia, Japan, Indonesia, France, Monaco and the European Union.

On 11 October 2019, the Counter Terrorism Department (CTD) of Punjab province arrested four LeT commanders on charges of terror funding, namely Zafar Iqbal, Yahya Aziz Mujahid, Muhammad Ashraf and Bhuttavi. The CTD had filed a First information report in 2015 against the four accused for violating the Anti-Terrorism Act 1997. Their assets were seized, and they were accused of creating the Al-Anfal Trust to pool terror funds. This trust purchased land in multiple Pakistani cities and built mosques. Their detention was said to be a great success in implementing the National Action Plan to combat terrorism. On 18 June 2020, Bhuttavi, Abdul Rehman Makki, Iqbal and Aziz were convicted of terror funding by judge Ijaz Ahmed Buttar from the Lahore branch of the Anti-Terrorism Court of Pakistan (ATC). Iqbal and Aziz were sentenced to five years of imprisonment and a fine of PKR 50,000 each; while Bhuttavi and Makki were sentenced to one year of imprisonment and a fine of PKR 20,000.

On 13 August 2020, the sentences of Makki and Bhuttavi were suspended by judges Asjad Javed Gural and Waheed Khan of the Lahore High Court, and they were released on bail. The trial against the two had started at Sahiwal ATC, but was transferred to Lahore on their request. The prosecution alleged their Al-Anfal Trust owned one kanal and three marlas of land in Okara, which they used for terror activities and where the Madrasa Jamia Sataria was built. The judges said there was no evidence proving fundraising by the accused and the prosecution failed to prove this charge. The ATC decision mentioned the accused admitting their association with the LeT, but denied involvement in terrorism. At this time, Makki and Bhuttavi were imprisoned at Kot Lakhpat Jail in Lahore, where Saeed was also detained since 17 July 2019.

Flag of the Lashkar-e-Taiba

On 18 August 2020, Iqbal and Bhuttavi were listed in an order by the Pakistan Ministry of Foreign Affairs, which enforced UNSC sanctions against hundreds of terrorists and 93 terrorist organizations. On 28 August, Iqbal and Bhuttavi were sentenced to 16.5 years in prison and fined PKR 170,000; while Makki received a sentence of 18 months and fined PKR 20,000. During case proceedings, the prosecution alleged the three were using land located in Vehari District for terrorism and financing. The land was registered in the name of Al-Hamad Trust, a banned organization. The court ordered the government to confiscate this property.

== Works ==
- چوری کے متعلق قانون الٰہی اور قانون حنفی [Divine law and Hanafi law regarding theft] (in Urdu). Lahore: Maktaba Islamia. 24 March 2009. Archived from the original on 15 October 2019.
- مسلمانوں میں ہندوانہ رسوم و رواج [Hindu customs and traditions among Muslims] (in Urdu). 18 March 2010. Archived from the original on 17 May 2025.
- دعوتی نصاب تربیت [Invitation to Islam: Methods and Training] (in Urdu). Lahore: Dar ul Andalus. 16 July 2013. Archived from the original on 14 June 2025.
- مقالات طیبہ [Malakat Tayyiba] (in Urdu). Lahore: Dar ul Andalus. 10 May 2014. Archived from the original on 16 June 2025.
- احکام زکاۃ و عشر و صدقہ فطر [The Rulings of Zakat, Ushr and Sadaqat-e-Fitr] (in Urdu). Lahore: Dar ul Andalus. 6 September 2015. Archived from the original on 13 July 2025.
- (اعلٰی) ترجمہ قرآن الکریم [Vernacular Translation of the Holy Quran] (in Urdu). Lahore: Dar ul Andalus. 4 October 2015. Archived from the original on 19 April 2025.
- تفسیر القرآن الکریم (عبد السلام بن محمد) جلد۔1 [Tafsir of the Holy Quran (Abd al-Salam ibn Muhammad) Volume 1] (in Urdu). Lahore: Dar ul Andalus. 5 October 2015. Archived from the original on 22 May 2025.
- تفسیر القرآن الکریم (عبد السلام بن محمد) جلد۔2 [Tafsir of the Holy Quran (Abd al-Salam ibn Muhammad) Volume 2] (in Urdu). Lahore: Dar ul Andalus. 6 October 2015. Archived from the original on 19 March 2025.
- تفسیر القرآن الکریم (عبد السلام بن محمد) جلد۔3 [Tafsir of the Holy Quran (Abd al-Salam ibn Muhammad) Volume 3] (in Urdu). Lahore: Dar ul Andalus. Archived from the original on 13 May 2025.
- تفسیر القرآن الکریم (عبد السلام بن محمد) جلد۔4 [Tafsir of the Holy Quran (Abd al-Salam ibn Muhammad) Volume 4] (in Urdu). Lahore: Dar ul Andalus. 8 October 2015. Archived from the original on 17 February 2025.
- حلال و حرام کاروبار شریعت کی روشنی میں [Halal and Haram: Business in the Light of Sharia] (in Urdu). Lahore: Dar ul Andalus. 7 December 2016. Archived from the original on 18 June 2025.
- مسلمانوں کو کافر قرار دینے کا فتنہ [The Temptation to Declare Muslims Infidels] (in Urdu). Lahore: Dar ul Andalus. 30 December 2016. Archived from the original on 19 June 2025.

=== Translations ===
- حصن المسلم (سعید بن علی) [Hisn ul Muslim (Said bin Ali)] (in Urdu). Lahore: Dar ul Andalus. 4 August 2009. Archived from the original on 14 May 2025. Urdu translation of the Hisn ul Muslim by Sa'id bin Ali bin Wahf Al-Qahtani.
- شرح کتاب الجامع من بلوغ المرام [Sharh Kitab al-Jami min Bulugh al-Maram] (in Urdu). Lahore: Dar ul Andalus. 6 February 2012. Archived from the original on 13 July 2025. A Sharh (commentary) on and Urdu translation of the Bulugh al-Maram by Ibn Hajar al-Asqalani.
- کبیرہ گناہ اور ان کا انجام [Major sins and their consequences] (in Urdu). Lahore: Dar ul Andalus. 26 December 2016. Archived from the original on 16 September 2025. Urdu commentary and partial translation of the Al-Kaba’ir by Al-Dhahabi.

=== Other works ===
Bhuttavi published an Urdu translation of the Islamic Faith by Muhammad bin Jamil Zeno. Bhuttavi was also working on an Urdu translation of and commentary on the Sahih al-Bukhari, but died before he could finish work on almost 700 hadith remaining in the compilation.

== Death ==
According to the UNSC, Bhuttavi died on 29 May 2023 in Muridke, Punjab province, due to cardiac arrest. According to the Hindustan Times, Bhuttavi was 78 years old at the time, died on the same day at a Sheikhupura jail and was buried at the LeT markaz (centre) in Muridke. According to NDTV, Bhuttavi was 77 years old at the time and was imprisoned at District Jail Sheikhupura. His funeral at the LeT centre in Muridke was attended by many LeT members amidst high security, and Saeed himself requested government approval to attend but was denied. Bhuttavi's funeral was attended by members of the Markazi Jamiat Ahle Hadith, Jamia Salafia and Markazia Faisalabad. Notable individuals present at the funeral were Makki, Nasr Javed, Saifullah Khalid, Abdul Rauf, and Saeed's son Talha Saeed.

Sanjay Mehta played the role of Bhuttavi in the 2025 Indian film Dhurandhar and the 2026 film Dhurandhar: The Revenge.

== Sources ==
=== Government documents ===
- "View UN Notices - Individuals | Bhuttavi, Hafiz Abdul Salam". Interpol. Archived from the original on 21 November 2025.
- "Anti-Terrorism Designations | Office of Foreign Assets Control". ofac.treasury.gov. Archived from the original on 1 July 2025.
- "Hafiz Abdul Salam Bhattvi". OpenSanctions.org. 9 December 2025. Archived from the original on 16 February 2025.
- "Sanctions List Materials | Narrative Summaries of Reasons for Listing | Hafiz Abdul Salam Bhuttavi". United Nations Security Council. Archived from the original on 24 December 2024.
- "Treasury Sanctions Lashkar-e Tayyiba Leaders and Founders". U.S. Department of the Treasury. 28 September 2011. Archived from the original on 15 October 2025.

=== Books and journals ===
- Alvi, Farhat Naseem; Ahmed, Maqsood (28 June 2020). "مولانا محمد جونا گڑھی اور حافظ عبدالسلام بُھٹوی کے ترجمہ قرآن مجید کا تقابلی جائزہ" [A comparative analysis of the translations of the Holy Quran by Maulana Muhammad Junagadhi and Hafiz Abdus Salam Bhuttovi]. Jihat Ul Islam (in Urdu). 13 (2): 19–38. Archived from the original on 7 September 2024.
- Fair, C. Christine (2018). In Their Own Words: Understanding Lashkar-e-Tayyaba. Oxford and New York: Oxford University Press. doi:10.1093/oso/9780190909482.001.0001. ISBN 9780190062033.

=== News articles ===
==== In Urdu ====
- Bilal, Rana (13 August 2020). "دہشتگردوں کی مالی معاونت کے کیس میں جماعت الدعوۃ کے 2 رہنماؤں کی سزائیں معطل" [Sentences of 2 Jamaat-ud-Dawa leaders suspended in terrorist financing case]. Dawn News (in Urdu). Archived from the original on 27 November 2022.
- Haq, Ibad ul (18 June 2020). "رہنماؤں کو غیر قانونی فنڈنگ کے الزام میں قید و جرمانے کی سزائیں کالعدم تنظیم جماعت الدعوۃ کے چار" [Four leaders of banned organization Jamaat-ud-Dawa sentenced to prison and fined on charges of illegal funding]. BBC Urdu (in Urdu). Archived from the original on 27 November 2022.
- Hayat, Hafiz Khizr (29 May 2023). "استاذ العلماء حافظ عبد السلام بھٹوی وفات پاگئے" [Scholar Hafiz Abdul Salam Bhuttovi passes away]. Al Ulama (in Urdu). Archived from the original on 14 June 2025.
- Hayat, Hafiz Khizr (4 June 2022). "حافظ عبد السلام بن محمد بھٹوی رحمہ اللہ کے حالات زندگی" [The life of Hafiz Abdus Salam bin Muhammad Bhuttovi]. Al Ulama (in Urdu). Archived from the original on 16 October 2024.
- "دہشتگردی کی مالی اعانت پر کالعدم تنظیموں کے 4 سرکردہ رہنما گرفتار" [4 top leaders of banned organizations arrested for financing terrorism]. Nawaiwaqt (in Urdu). 11 October 2019. Archived from the original on 27 November 2022.
- Rabbani, Hafiz Amjad (9 January 2024). "حافظ عبدالسلام بھٹوی رحمہ اللہ" [Hafiz Abdul Salam Bhuttovi's life and works]. Al Ulama (in Urdu). Archived from the original on 31 December 2025.

==== In English ====
- Khan, Omer Farooq (13 August 2020). "Pak court suspends sentence of two JuD leaders". The Times of India. Archived from the original on 17 June 2025.
- Laskar, Rezaul Hasan (29 August 2020). Sarkar, Sohini (ed.). "Pakistani court convicts 3 LeT and JuD leaders, including Hafiz Saeed's brother-in-law". Hindustan Times. Archived from the original on 14 October 2024.
- Laskar, Rezaul Hasan (30 May 2023). "Top LeT leader, who prepared 26/11 Mumbai attackers, dies in Pak jail". Hindustan Times. Archived from the original on 19 September 2024.
- "UN-Designated Terrorist, Who Trained 26/11 Attackers, Dies In Pak Jail". NDTV. Press Trust of India. 31 May 2023. Archived from the original on 9 September 2025.
- "Terror financing case: Pakistan court indicts Hafiz Saeed's 4 close aides". The Hindu. Press Trust of India. 10 June 2020. Archived from the original on 30 June 2020.
- "Who was Abdul Salam Bhuttavi, Hafiz Saeed's deputy and key planner of Mumbai terror attacks". The Times of India. 12 January 2024. Archived from the original on 17 March 2025.
