= Jamia Salafia =

Jamia Salfia may refer to:

- Jamia Salafia, Varanasi, Ahl-i Hadith (Salafi) seminary in Varanasi, India (estb. 1963)
- Jamia Salafia, Faisalabad, Pakistan

== See also ==
- Jamia
- Salafi movement
