= Mumbai serial train blasts investigations =

Police investigations in India

The following is the account given by the Mumbai Police Anti-Terrorist Squad of the investigation of the July 11, 2006 Mumbai serial train blasts which killed 209 people and injured over 700. A series of seven bomb blasts that took place over a period of 11 minutes on the Suburban Railway in Mumbai, the capital of Indian state of Maharashtra and the nation's financial capital. The bombs were set off in pressure cookers on trains plying the Western line of the Suburban Railway network. The convicts have been punished. 5 were sentenced to death and 7 were sentenced to life in prison.

== The timeline given by the Mumbai Police ==
=== March 2006 ===
The conspiracy is hatched. LeT's Azam Cheema masterminds the blasts at his mansion in Bahawalpur with two modules of SIMI and LeT and their leaders. 11

=== May 2006 ===
50 persons are sent to their training camp in Bahawalpur. They are trained to make bombs, fire guns and resist interrogation.

=== 25 June 2006 ===
LeT infiltrates bombers. Kamal Ansari (the prime accused) transports two Pakistanis via Nepal border, Abdul Majid transports five via Bangladesh border and unknown man escorts four from Kachchh-(Gujarat)

=== 27 June 2006 ===
The 11 men are lodged in 4 different places in Mumbai suburbs. Two lodged in Malad, four in Bandra, two in Borivali and three in Mumbra.

=== 8–10 July ===
Ehsan Ullah transports 15 to 20 kg of RDX from Pakistan via Kandla. Ammonium nitrate bought in Mumbai. 8 cookers purchased from 2 different shops in Santa Cruz.

=== 9–10 July ===
Bombs made in Md. Ali's flat in Govandi. Each cooker filled with 2-2.5 kg RDX and 3.5–4 kg ammonium nitrate. Transported to Sheikh Bandras home.

=== 11 July 2006 ===
Terrorists divide themselves into seven groups, two Indians and one Pakistani. Each group carries one pressure cooker in black Rexine bag, covered with newspapers. Planters get off at Churchgate station and use the subway that connects the platforms to board train. However, one bomber gets left behind on a train due to crowd rush and is killed in the blast.

== Investigations (Timeline) ==
=== Mammoth Task ===
Police started from scratch as there were no clues on the site, all the clues they had were seven charred train compartments and the knowledge that ammonium nitrate was used.

=== The First Steps ===
ATS Chief KPS Raghuvanshi split officers into seven teams for the seven blasts. Sought RAW and IB inputs. Police detained over 400 people from Mumbai suburbs with no success.

=== The Cooker Handles ===
Police sift through blast sites and find pressure cooker handles and parts of aluminium lids in all the seven compartments, Shops from where cookers were sold traced.

=== Breakthrough ===
First success came on 18 July, when police intercept calls from Mumtaz Chowdhury to brother in law, Kamal Ahmed Ansar at Basupatti, Bihar.

=== Tracing the RDX ===
Cotton swab method reveals Faisal Sheikh's house in Bandra which was used to store bombs.

=== The Nemesis ===
Kamal Ansari and Ehtesham module was unearthed by ATS. This unveiled the module led by Faisal Sheikh. Mastermind Raheel Sheikh still missing.

Alleged Accused:

So far 13 people from across India have been arrested and charges have been framed against them.

6 April 2013

- IM co-founder Sadiq Sheikh declared hostile witness by defence advocates.

== Police Accusations ==
The Indian Police had initially suspected that the blasts were masterminded by the banned SIMI and carried out by the LeT with substantial help from the Pakistani intelligence agency, ISI. When the Mumbai Police Chief, AN Roy, made the above allegations, and reiterated that there was good evidence of the ISI's hand in it. However, he said that they would need more evidence to prove the fact in a court of law.

Police have said that majority of the Indian conspirators in the blasts have been arrested. 2 have escaped to Pakistan. Also, one Indian conspirator died in the blast, whose body had remained unidentified since the blasts.

Police have also stated that out of the 11 Pakistanis involved, 2 were gunned down in an encounter in North Mumbai on 21 August. Police say they have evidence and locations of all the other 9, who they say are in Pakistan.

== Aftermaths ==
Diplomatic relations between India and Pakistan soured after the allegations, with Pakistan denying all the allegations as "baseless" and saying it "definitely" won't hand over any suspect to India. India's PM has also repeatedly said there is "concrete" evidence against Pakistan and it will be presented to them. Indian Home Ministry officials have also vociferously backed up that claim. Also, an Indo-Pak "joint anti-terror mechanism" had been signed between the Indian PM and Pakistani President in Cuba in September 2006, under which the two countries agreed to "mutually combat terrorism". The Indian PM has repeatedly said that Pakistan's response to the evidence presented by India will be a "litmus test to their commitment to the joint anti-terror mechanism and its efforts to combat terrorism." However, most Indian analysts have lambasted the joint-anti terror mechanism saying it is a "farce"
