= KKF =

KKF may refer to:

- Kai Kara-France
- Kamal Kumari Foundation
- Khidmat-e-Khalq Foundation
- Khmers Kampuchea-Krom Federation
- Khpal Kor Foundation
- Chamber of Commerce and Factories, native name Kamer van Koophandel en Fabrieken, in Suriname
