= Nasr Javed =

Pakistani Islamist (born 1950s)

- Years active: 2004–2025
- Organization: Lashkar-e-Taiba
- Wanted by: India; United States
- Wanted since: 2009

Nasr Javed is a Pakistani Lashkar-e-Taiba militant. He has been sanctioned under the Specially Designated Nationals and Blocked Persons List of the United States Office of Foreign Assets Control and is on the list of "individuals banned from the UK for stirring-up hatred" for "engaging in unacceptable behaviour by seeking to foment, justify or glorify terrorist violence in furtherance of particular beliefs."

== Early life and career ==
Javed's birth year is variously listed as 1956, 1958 and 1965. According to an Indian dossier, Javed is the nephew of Lashkar-e-Taiba (LeT) founder and leader Hafiz Saeed, and also close to Jaish-e-Mohammed leader Masood Azhar. Javed is reportedly the emir (chief) of all LeT training camps and enables weapons training. As of 2010, he was the commander of the LeT camp in Mansehra District, the Jamia Abu Hureira. Javed was also the commander of the LeT Daura-e-Aam course at the Umar bin Khattab camp, located in Kunduz and shared with the Taliban. As of 2010, he was reportedly running a camp, under the cover of a school, located near the Karakoram Highway connecting Pakistan and China.

According to the Specially Designated Nationals and Blocked Persons List of the United States Office of Foreign Assets Control, Javed belongs to Gujranwala District in Punjab, Pakistan. He currently resides in Mansehra District in Khyber Pakhtunkhwa. Javed's alias is Abu Ishmael. Javed was placed under US sanctions on 7 January 2009 under Executive Order 13224, for his links to the LeT. Javed was the joint planner of the August 2007 Hyderabad bombings. On 5 February 2008, Kashmir Solidarity Day in Pakistan, Javed said in a speech "jihad will spread from Kashmir to other parts of India. Muslims will rule India again." He also said "the government of Pakistan might have abandoned jihad, but we have not. Our agenda is clear. We will continue to wage and propagate jihad until eternity."

In a dossier sent on 25 February 2010 to Salman Bashir, Pakistan's Foreign Secretary, Javed was listed as one of 24 terrorists wanted by India who were living in Pakistan. Javed was banned from visiting the UK in 2009. According to Jacqui Smith, the British Home Secretary at the time, Javed was involved in training Liberation Tigers of Tamil Eelam suicide bombers. Javed was the commander of the LeT camp in Dulai, Pakistan administered Kashmir, from 2004 to 2015. He is also a key member of the LeT's financing front, the Khidmat-e-Khalq Foundation, previously the Falah-e-Insaniat Foundation, an organization banned by the United Nations. In 2025, Javed was appointed the commander of the Markaz Jihad-e-Aqsa, a new LeT fedayeen training camp located in Lower Dir District. According to journalist Amit Bhardwaj, in November 2025 the LeT started working to increase its recruitment in Sindh province. On 23 and 24 November 2025, rallies and sessions were held in Karachi, led by Javed, the 3rd deputy of the LeT Abdur Rauf, and LeT Sindh commander Faisal Nadeem.

== Sources ==
- Gupta, Shishir (12 March 2010). "The Delhi Dossier". The Indian Express.
- Roggio, Bill; Weiss, Caleb (4 July 2016). "Taliban shows 'Omar ibn Khattab' training camp in Kunduz". FDD's Long War Journal. Archived from the original on 12 July 2025.
- Sibal, Siddhant; Parveen, Gulshan (26 September 2025). "After Jaish & Hizbul, terror group Lashkar moves camps to KPK". WION. Archived from the original on 20 December 2025.
