= 2006 Ahmedabad railway station bombing =

Bombing in India

- Location: Ahmedabad, Gujarat, India
- Date: 19 February 2006; 01:43 (IST)
- Attack type: Bomb blasts
- Deaths: 0-1
- Injuries: 10-25
- Perpetrator: Lashkar-e-Taiba
- Accused: Ahmed Bilal, Mahmad Aamir Shakeel Ahmed Shaikh, Mahmad Iliyas Abdul Memon, Saiyyed Aaqib, Mahmad Aslam Kashmiri, Abu Jundal

The 2006 Ahmedabad railway station bombing was a blast at platform number 2/3 of Kalupur railway station Ahmedabad, India. 10-25 people sustained minor injuries. At the time of blast no train was present at the platform, two trains had passed before explosion and the Kutch express was about to arrive at the platform, the casualties and severity of the explosion may increased if any train was present at the platform.

The blasts had occurred at the public call office booths installed at the railway station platforms at around 1:43 am. Gujarat police presumed that due to the faulty timer device the severity of the explosion decreased.

== Investigations ==
1.5 kg of RDX explosives was planted in a suitcase. The explosives had arrived at Ahmedabad railway station from Mumbai in the chair-car compartment of Mumbai-Ahmedabad Karnavati Express. The bomb had been originally placed in the Karnavati Express. Kamlesh Bhagora, a constable of Government Railway Police had asked a porter to attend an unclaimed suitcase kept in the AC compartment of the train, the porter placed that suitcase near the tea stall at platform number 2/3, the bomb exploded shortly after that.

Gujarat Anti-Terrorist Squad (ATS) arrested Mahmad Aamir Shakeel Ahmed Shaikh, Mahmad Iliyas Abdul Memon, Saiyyed Aaqib, Mahmad Aslam Kashmiri, and Abu Jundal.

In September 2021 Gujarat ATS arrested Ahmed Bilal, an accused terrorist wanted in blast case from Baramulla district, Jammu and Kashmir. According to Gujarat ATS, Bilal bombed a train and detonated IED. He was a student in Madrasa at Bharuch back in 2006. where he got involved with the banned terrorist organization, Lashkar-e-Taiba. He had allegedly convinced other students to take revenge for the Godhra-inspired riots of 2002 and facilitated their training at Azad Kashmir and Pakistan with the help of Inter-Services Intelligence (ISI) to train them in shooting and bomb-making.

== See also ==
- 2006 Mumbai train bombings
- 2008 Ahmedabad bombings
