= Ehtesham Siddiqui =

Indian national acquitted for 2006 bombings

Ehtesham Siddiqui (born 1982) is an Indian national who was initially convicted and later acquitted in connection with the 2006 Mumbai train bombings, a series of coordinated attacks on the Mumbai suburban railway that killed over 180 people and injured hundreds.

== Early life and education ==
Ehtesham Siddiqui was born in 1982 in Jaunpur, India. At the time of his arrest in 2006, he was a final-year chemical engineering student at a local college in Mumbai. He was married just a year before his detention.

== Arresting ==
The 11 July 2006 Mumbai train bombings were one of the deadliest terror attacks in India, involving seven explosions across the suburban railway network. Following the blasts, the Maharashtra Anti-Terrorism Squad (ATS) arrested Siddiqui along with several others, alleging links to banned organisations.

== Trial and conviction ==
In September 2015, a special court under the Maharashtra Control of Organised Crime Act (MCOCA) found Siddiqui guilty, along with eleven others, on charges including murder, conspiracy, and terrorism-related offences. He was sentenced to death along with the other convicts.

== Acquittal ==
On 21 July 2025, the Bombay High Court acquitted all twelve individuals convicted in the case, including Siddiqui. The court stated that the prosecution "utterly failed" to prove the case against the accused, citing issues such as unreliable witness testimony, questionable confessions, and lack of forensic evidence.

Following the acquittal, Siddiqui and the other acquitted individuals were released from prison after spending over 17 years incarcerated.

Siddiqui acquired 7 Degrees, 3 Diplomas and 13 certificate programmes during incarcerartion.

== Post-release life ==
During his imprisonment, he pursued higher education and is now in the final semester of his law degree. He also became an advocate for the rights of wrongfully imprisoned individuals, using his experience to highlight issues within the justice system.

== Publications ==
In 2024, Siddiqui authored a memoir titled Horror Saga, which provides a personal account of his experiences during his wrongful imprisonment and the broader issues within the Indian justice system. The book has been noted for its poignant and reflective narrative, shedding light on the challenges faced by individuals wrongfully accused and the systemic flaws that contribute to such injustices.

== In media ==
Human rights groups, civil liberties advocates, and sections of the media have raised concerns about the investigation and trial process. Reports in The Hindu, Indian Express, Scroll, and BBC Hindi have highlighted allegations of coerced confessions, lack of corroborative evidence, and possible wrongful implication of some accused, including Siddiqui.
