= 2006 Mumbai train bombings =

2006 terrorist attack on the Mumbai Suburban Railway by Lashkar-e-Taiba

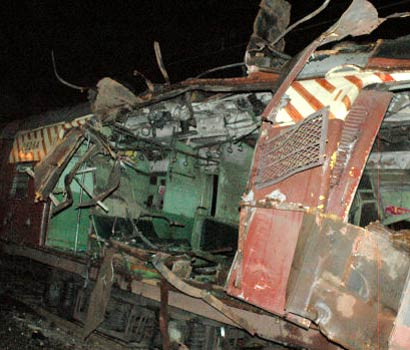
- One of the bomb-damaged coaches at Mahim station
- Location: Mumbai, Maharashtra, India
- Date: 11 July 2006; 20 years ago 18:24 – 18:35 (UTC+05:30)
- Target: Mumbai Western Line
- Attack type: Train bombings
- Weapon: Pressure cooker bombs
- Deaths: 209
- Injuries: Approximately 714
- Perpetrators: Lashkar-e-Taiba and Indian Mujahideen
- Motive: Islamic terrorism
- Accused: Faisal Sheikh, Asif Khan, Kamal Ansari, Ehtesham Sidduqui and Naveed Khan (acquitted on 21 July 2025)

The 2006 Mumbai train bombings, colloquially known as 7/11, were a series of seven bomb blasts on 11 July 2006. They took place over a period of 11 minutes on the Suburban Railway in Mumbai, the capital of the Indian state of Maharashtra and the nation's financial capital. The bombs were set off in pressure cookers on trains on the Western Line Suburban Section of the Mumbai Division of Western Railway. The blasts killed 209 people and injured over 700 more.

Pressure cookers were used in the bombing and other attacks to increase the afterburn in a thermobaric reaction, more powerful than conventional high explosives. The first blast reportedly took place at 18:24 IST (12:54 UTC), and the explosions continued until 18:35, during the after-work rush hour. All the bombs had been placed in the first-class "general" compartments of several trains running from Churchgate, the city-centre end of the western railway line, to the western suburbs of the city. They exploded at or in the near vicinity of the suburban railway stations of Matunga Road, Mahim Junction, Bandra, Khar Road, Jogeshwari, Bhayandar and Borivali. Home Minister Shivraj Patil told reporters that authorities had "some" information an attack was coming, "but place and time was not known".

Initial investigation revealed that the plot was hatched by Azam Cheema, an operative of the Pakistan based Jihad terror outfit Lashkar-e-Taiba in Bahawalpur, in collaboration with Students' Islamic Movement of India. The probe revealed infiltration of several LeT bombers from Pakistan through Nepal border. Subsequent investigation into the train bombings and other terror attacks in 2008 revealed the involvement of Indian Mujahideen in the attack.

Two Pakistani bombers were eventually gunned down in an encounter with Mumbai police on 21 August 2006, while one bomber was killed in the attack due to crowd rush. Eventually, 13 of the accused were arrested, with 12 people convicted in September 2015, five of whom were given capital punishment.

On 21 July 2025, Bombay High Court acquitted all 12 accused in the case, including those sentenced to life imprisonment. Court said that the prosecution had "utterly failed" to prove the charges against the accused.

On 24 July 2025, Supreme Court of India stayed the acquittal order of the Bombay High Court and later clarified that the released accused would not return to jail.

== Injuries and fatalities ==
2006 Mumbai train bombings Confirmed casualties
Train	Blast location	Carriage type	Time (IST)	Deaths	Injured	Sources
Travelling north from Churchgate	Khar Road – Santacruz	First Class	18:24	9		
17:50 Fast Local; Churchgate-Borivali	Bandra – Khar Road	First Class	18:24	22		
17:37 Slow Local; Churchgate-Borivali	Jogeshwari (PF #1)	First Class	18:25	28		
17:54 Fast Local; Churchgate-Borivali	Mahim Junction (PF #3)	First Class	18:26	43		
Travelling north from Churchgate	Mira Road – Bhayandar	First Class	18:29	31		
17:57 Fast Local; Churchgate-Virar	Matunga Road – Mahim Junction	First Class	18:30	28		
17:37 Fast Local; Churchgate-Virar	Borivali ^{1}	First Class	18:35	26		
		Total	11 minutes	209	714	
^{1} One bomb exploded at this location, but another one was found by police and defused.

Maharashtra Deputy Chief Minister R. R. Patil confirmed that a total of 200 people were killed and another 714 were injured. Various news organisations reported that at least 200 people died and that more than 700 others were injured. A week after the blasts in Mumbai the confirmed death toll rose to 207. In September 2006, it was confirmed that the death toll had risen to 209.

== Response ==
A state of high alert was declared in India's major cities. Both the airports in Mumbai were placed on high alert. The western line of the Mumbai Suburban Railway network was at first shut down, although some trains resumed service later, and stringent security arrangements, including frisking and searching of commuters, were instituted on the other lines of the network. The city's bus service, the BEST, pressed extra buses into service to transport stranded commuters home.

The Prime Minister also held a security meeting at his residence attended by Home Minister Shivraj Patil, National Security Advisor M K Narayanan, and Home Secretary V K Duggal.

=== Resumption of services and return to normality ===
Western Railway services were restored on 11 July by 10.45 p.m. As a show of investor confidence, the Bombay Stock Exchange rebounded, starting the day with the BSE Sensex Index up by nearly 1% in morning trade. Foreign investors also retained confidence, with the Sensex up almost 3% at 10,930.09 at the end of the day's trade.

=== Rescue and relief operations ===
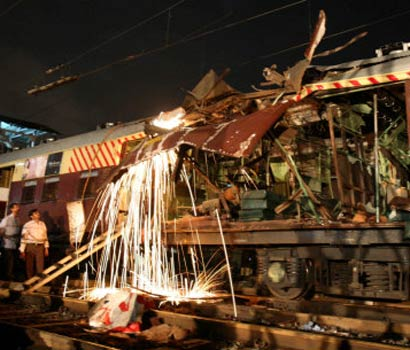
Railway workers cutting a damaged part of the bomb-damaged coaches

- Initial rescue efforts were hampered by the heavy rains and the prevalent monsoon flooding, but quickly took momentum after fellow passengers and bystanders helped victims to reach waiting ambulances and/or provided first aid.
- Maharashtra Chief Minister Vilasrao Deshmukh announced ex-gratia payments of Rs 100,000 (approximately US $2,200) to the next of kin of those who died in the explosion. The injured would be given Rs 50,000 (approximately US $1,100) each.
- Indian Railways announced Rs 500,000 (approximately US $10,000) compensation and a job to the next of kin of those killed in the serial blasts in Mumbai. The announcements were made by Railways Minister Lalu Prasad Yadav after visiting those injured in the blasts at a hospital in Mumbai.

However a study commissioned by former MP Kirit Somaiya noted that only 174 of the 1,077 victims had received compensation through the Railway Claims Tribunal. For the handicapped victims, only 15 out of 235 eligible cases had been taken care of. Regarding the Prime Minister's promise to India concerning the rehabilitation of the victims, L. K. Advani noted that "none of the above mentioned assurances has been fulfilled to any degree of satisfaction"

=== Sources of information ===
Due to the mobile phone networks being jammed, news channels ran tickertapes with information of injured individuals as well as SMS messages from those who wished to contact their families. Reports indicated that at around 18:00 UTC on 11 July (11:30 p.m. in Mumbai), the phone networks were restoring service; telephone service was completely restored during the night.

== Investigation ==
Some 350 people were detained 36 hours after the incident in Maharashtra — police claim that these are people rounded up for investigations. On 14 July, Lashkar-e-Qahhar, a terrorist organisation front linked to Lashkar-e-Taiba (LeT), claimed responsibility for the bombings. In an e-mail to an Indian TV channel, the outfit says it organised the bombings using 16 people who are all "safe". According to the e-mail, the main motive seems to have been a retaliation to the situation in the Gujarat and Kashmir regions. It also says that the blasts were part of a series of attacks aimed at other sites such as the Mumbai international airport, Gateway of India, the Taj Mahal in Agra and the Red Fort in New Delhi. The authorities are investigating this claim and are trying to track the location of the e-mail sender. However, on 17 July, the forensic science laboratory Mumbai confirmed the use of a mixture of the highly explosive RDX and ammonium nitrate for the bombings. The presence of these explosives in the debris was confirmed by modern techniques such as liquid chromatography with mass detector (LCMS), gas chromatography with mass detector (GCMS) and ion scan chromatography. They indicated a strong possibility of all explosives being planted at the Churchgate railway station, which was the starting point for all affected trains.

Initially, religious extremists from the Lashkar-e-Taiba and the banned Students Islamic Movement of Pakistani terrorist groups, and Pakistan's intelligence agency ISI were the prime suspects. Both Lashkar and SIMI denied responsibility for the bombings. There was also evidence about the involvement of the international Islamic terrorist group Al-Qaeda following a phone call from a man claiming to be a spokesperson for the group on 13 July.

On 30 September 2006, CNN reported that "The Indian government accused Pakistan's military spy agency, the Inter-Services Intelligence, of planning 11 July Mumbai train bombings that killed 209 people".

The New York City Police Department was intensely concerned about the attacks, citing their simplicity and lethality. To address these worries, the department deployed Brandon del Pozo, a Jordanian-based intelligence officer, to Mumbai to collect information on the attacks and report on ways they reflected similar vulnerabilities in the New York City's extensive commuter rail system.

The main conspirator of the attack, Azam Cheema, who was a part of Lashkar-e-Taiba, hatched the plot in March 2006, and made successful attempts to infiltrate Pakistani bombers into India through the Nepal border. Cheema was reportedly well connected with former ISI chief Hamid Gul. In November 2010, Cheema was sanctioned as a Specially Designated Global Terrorist under the Specially Designated Nationals and Blocked Persons List by the United States Department of the Treasury's Office of Foreign Assets Control Cheema reportedly died of heart attack in February 2024.

=== Arrests and encounters ===
On 21 July 2006, police arrested three people suspected to be involved in the bombings. Police had detained more than 300 suspects since 18 July but these were the first arrests in the case. Two of the men were detained on Thursday in the northern state of Bihar and the third later in Mumbai. All three are said to belong to the banned SIMI organisation. On the same day, Abdul Karim Tunda was thought to be arrested in Mombasa, Kenya on suspicions of involvement in the train bombings. but it was the wrong person. He was one of India's most wanted men and also a suspected organiser for the banned terrorist group Lashkar-e-Taiba. He was arrested in 2013 near the Nepal border.

In late 2006, all the seven key accused in the Mumbai train blasts in July retracted their alleged confession to the police, saying they were illegally forced to sign blank papers, an Indian TV channel reported.

More than a month after the bombings, 2 Pakistani terrorists, Abu Osama and Muhammad Ali, were killed in an encounter with the Mumbai Police at Antop Hill area. Subsequently, investigations in the 2008 Delhi bombings revealed the involvement of Indian Mujahideen in the 2006 attacks, when 2 IM terrorists, Atif Amin, who was involved in the 2006 plot, and Mohammad Sajid, were killed in the Batla House encounter. The capture of IM terrorist Sadiq Sheikh further confirmed the involvement of IM.

=== Continuing investigation ===
M K Narayanan, the Indian National Security Advisor, said that India does not have "clinching" evidence of the involvement of ISI in the Mumbai train blasts of 11 July.

"I would hesitate to say we have clinching evidence but we have pretty good evidence," he was quoted as saying on CNN-IBN.

Following Narayanan's remarks, the Union Home Secretary V.K. Duggal on Monday characterised the evidence as "very good [...] it is fairly solid evidence,". 5 On 25 September 2008, Hindustan Times reported that "the Crime branch also learnt that the men [behind 2008 Delhi bombings] are those very operatives who had introduced themselves as Pakistanis to perpetrators of 11 July 2006 Mumbai train bombings.

=== Involvement of Indian Mujahideen ===
On 27 February 2009, Sadiq Sheikh, an arrested leader of the Indian Mujahideen confessed to his alleged role in the bombings in a news channel broadcast. He claimed to have engineered the pressure cooker bombs with his associates in a flat in central Mumbai. If verified, these allegations could invalidate the previous claims by the ATS that the ISI or the SIMI were involved. Sadiq states in his confession, "All five of us arranged local first-class train passes beforehand. We also had the local train timetable with us so that we could choose a train as per our convenience. We purchased bags and pressure cookers in Bombay." He also claimed to have misled investigators by blaming the attacks on the Al-Qaeda. On 6 April 2013, IM co-founder Sadiq Sheikh was declared hostile witness by defence advocates.

=== Trial and acquittal ===
In September 2015, 12 people were convicted in this case. On 30 September 2015, a special Maharashtra Control of Organised Crime Act (MCOCA) court sentenced Faisal Sheikh, Asif Khan, Kamal Ansari, Ehtesham Siddiqui and Naveed Khan to death. They planted the bombs in various trains. The other seven convicts—Mohammed Sajid Ansari, who prepared the electrical circuits for the bombs, Mohammed Ali, who provided his Govandi residence to make the bombs, Dr Tanveer Ansari, one of the conspirators, and Majid Shafi, Muzzammil Shaikh, Sohail Shaikh and Zamir Shaikh who provided logistical support – were sentenced to life imprisonment.

Kamal Ahmed Ansari died due to a COVID infection in 2021 while lodged in a Nagpur prison.

On 21 July 2025, the Bombay High Court refused to confirm the death sentence for five convicted and acquitted all the 12 accused, due to lack of substantiating evidence and disparities in the investigation. The acquittal sparked backlash, with the Maharashtra Government filing an appeal with the Supreme Court. This order is later stayed by the Supreme Court on 24 July.

== Impact ==
=== Heightened security measures ===
In wake of the blasts, the Indian government tightened security in railway stations. Under new restrictions passed by the Ministry of Railways, non-passengers would no longer be allowed on the railway platforms after July 2006. Other major security steps include installation of close circuit televisions inside the stations for round-the-clock vigil and installation of metal detectors.

=== Statements in response ===
Various senior political figures from India and around the world condemned the attacks. In India, Prime Minister Dr. Manmohan Singh was quick to call for calm in Mumbai, while President Dr. A. P. J. Abdul Kalam, Railways Minister Lalu Prasad Yadav, and president of the Indian National Congress Sonia Gandhi also issued statements regarding the bombings in Mumbai. Officials from other nations offered their condolences to those affected by the bombings. Officials from Pakistan, which has long feuded with India, and the United Kingdom, which was the target of similar attacks the previous July, were among those who denounced the attacks in Mumbai as well as terrorism as a whole.

=== Memorial service ===
A memorial service was held in Mumbai on 18 July at 6:25 p.m. Indian Standard Time— exactly one week after the blasts. President Abdul Kalam, his hand raised to his forehead in salute, led the two-minute silence as people lit candles and placed wreaths at Mahim station, one of the seven places on the suburban rail network hit by bombs. Sirens sounded across Mumbai marking the memorial service. People gathered at the site of the blasts, in railway stations on the city's Western Line, traffic came to a halt, It interrupted films and observed a moment of silence to pay homage to the victims.

== In popular culture ==
- Savita Bano, a 2006 Indian Marathi-language film by Ramesh More followed a woman's search for her husband after the blasts.
- The incidents that followed the bombings were used as details in the plot of the film, A Wednesday! (2008) starring Naseeruddin Shah, which was inspired by the train bombings.
- The Hindi film Mumbai Meri Jaan (2008), which won multiple Filmfare Awards, deals with the aftermath of the Mumbai train bombings.
- The movie The Train is a 2011 Malayalam thriller based on the bombings.

== See also ==
- Mumbai serial train blasts investigations- The official police investigations into the blasts.
- 1993 Mumbai bombings: another series of bombings that occurred in Mumbai
- 2003 Mumbai train bombing in Mulund – Mulund Blasts – BBC
- 13 July 2011 Mumbai bombings
- List of terrorist incidents involving railway systems
- Islamic terrorism
- 2004 Madrid train bombings: similar precedent
- 7 July 2005 London bombings: a similar series of bombings involving a transport system
- 29 October 2005 Delhi bombings: a series of three blasts in crowded markets in Delhi, two days before the Hindu festival Diwali
- 7 March 2006 Varanasi bombings: a series of similar blasts
- 2006 Jama Masjid explosions: two explosions outside the Jama Masjid mosque in Delhi in April 2006
- 2007 Samjhauta Express bombings
- Najibullah Zazi; 2009 attempt to bomb the New York City subway system
- 2010 Moscow Metro bombings
- Boston Marathon bombing; bombing using similar explosives
- 2001 Indian Parliament attack
