= Mankoli =

Village in Maharashtra

- village
- Location in Maharashtra, India Mankoli (India)
- Coordinates: 19.2404381°N 73.0449551°E
- Country: India
- State: Maharashtra
- District: Thane
- Taluka: Bhiwandi
- Elevation: 10 m (33 ft)

Population (2011)
  - Total: 3,421
- Time zone: UTC+5:30 (IST)
- 2011 census code: 552667

Mankoli is a village in the Thane district of Maharashtra, India. It is located in the Bhiwandi taluka.

== Demographics ==
According to the 2011 census of India, Mankoli has 860 households. The effective literacy rate (i.e. the literacy rate of population excluding children aged 6 and below) is 82.47%.

Demographics (2011 Census)
	Total	Male	Female
Population	3421	2013	1408
Children aged below 6 years	546	305	241
Scheduled caste	231	124	107
Scheduled tribe	47	21	26
Literates	2371	1494	877
Workers (all)	1712	1306	406
Main workers (total)	1397	1194	203
Main workers: Cultivators	51	36	15
Main workers: Agricultural labourers	44	39	5
Main workers: Household industry workers	59	36	23
Main workers: Other	1243	1083	160
Marginal workers (total)	315	112	203
Marginal workers: Cultivators	32	14	18
Marginal workers: Agricultural labourers	7	1	6
Marginal workers: Household industry workers	31	7	24
Marginal workers: Others	245	90	155
Non-workers	1709	707	1002
