= Khadim's case =

Kidnapping of the Managing Director of Khadim's in Kolkata

Khadim's case refers to the 2001 kidnapping of Partha Pratim Roy Burman, chairman and managing director of Khadim's Shoes, and his subsequent release after the payment of a ransom of ₹3.75 crore (US$794,732.3), some of which was reportedly used to fund the 9/11 attacks in America and the 13 December 2001 attack on Indian Parliament.

In 2009, Dubai don Aftab Ansari was found to be the mastermind in the kidnapping and extortion; he and four of his aides were sentenced to life imprisonment. In 2017, an additional eight people, including three Pakistani nationals, were found guilty in the kidnapping and sentenced to life imprisonment.

== Kidnap ==
On 25 July 2001, Partha Pratim was kidnapped from C. N. Roy road in Tiljala, Calcutta in the eastern Indian state of West Bengal. He was shot at when he resisted and then held hostage in a secluded house in a village in North 24 Parganas district on the India-Bangladesh border.

== Ransom ==
According to C.I.D Inspector General Partha Bhattacharjee, the family of Roy Burman paid the ransom of ₹3 crore and the payment took place at Hyderabad of which ₹3.40 lakh was recovered from two hawala operators through whom the ransom money was routed to the Dubai mastermind Aftab Ansari.

== Release ==
On 2 August 2001, Partha Pratim is released from a house in Pukhuria in Haroa, North 24 Parganas district of West Bengal state.

== Accused ==
There were altogether 33 accused in the case, including the four who abducted Roy Burman, two approvers and two others who were killed in police encounters. Three are still at large.

- Aftab Ansari (a.k.a. Farhan Malik and Shafiq Mohammad Rana)- Gangster and leader of the cell.
- Asif Raza Khan (a.k.a. Rajan) - dubbed the CEO of Aftab Ansari and member of Harkat-ul-Mujahideen, arrested on 29 October 2001 in New Delhi by Delhi Police. Asif was in contact with released Harkat-ul-Ansar militant Omar Sheikh and had travelled to Pakistan to meet Omar. According to police officer Neeraj Kumar, Asif is reported to have said that “boss Aftab Ansari had shared the ransom money collected in the kidnapping of Partha Pratim Roy Burman... with Omar Sheikh.” Omar Sheikh is reported to have transferred it to 9/11 attacker Mohamed Atta.
- Jalaluddin Molla (a.k.a. Amanullah Mandal and Babu Bhai), member of HuJIB (Harkat-ul-Jihad-al-Islami Bangladesh) was believed to have played a key role in the crime and was arrested in Lucknow in June 2007.

== Sentencings ==
20 May 2009 - Additional district sessions judge Biswarup Bandyopadhyay sentences Aftab Ansari, Happy Singh alias Harpreet Singh, Abdur Rahman Kunji, Yakub Ali and Shahabuddin Shaukat to life imprisonment for the kidnapping.

15 November 2014 - The Calcutta High Court upheld the life sentence awarded to three associates of Dubai don Aftab Ansari for the crime of kidnapping Roy Burman. In a brief order, the division bench of Justice Nisitha Mahtre and Justice Tapas Kumar Mukherjee said the appeal moved by Abdur Rahman Kunji, Shaoukat Hossein and Akib Ali was being rejected and the trial court order sentencing the trio to jail for life upheld.

8 December 2017 - The Additional Sessions Judge of Alipore Court, Arun Kiran Banerjee, found eight accused guilty in the abduction of Parthapratim Roy Burman. The eight accused who were found guilty include Azgar Khan, Dilshad Khan, Akhtar Hossain, Nayeem, Muzammel Sheikh, Noor Rahman alias Alam, Mizanur Rahman and Akhtar alias Palwan. Out of the eight, Arshad, Dilshad and Nayeem are Pakistani citizens.

The eight convicted on the charge of abducting for ransom, would undergo rigorous life imprisonment and pay a fine of three lakh rupees each, failing which they would remain in jail for another two years. In connection with the charge of wrongful confinement, they were separately sentenced to one year each in jail. Both the jail terms would continue concurrently.

== See also ==
- List of kidnappings
- List of solved missing person cases (2000s)
