= Syed Abdul Karim Tunda =

Alleged terrorist

- Born: Syed Abdul Karim; 1943 (age 82–83); Daryaganj, Delhi, India
- Other name: Tunda
- Occupations: Carpentry and scrap business in past
- Known for: Alleged involvement in over 40 bombings in India
- Spouse(s): Mumtaz and two others
- Children: 7

Syed Abdul Karim, alias Tunda (born 1943) is an accused of masterminding over 40 bombings in India supported by Pakistani terrorists. He was arrested by Indian authorities on 16 August 2013 from the India-Nepal border at Banbasa. However, the exact timings of this arrest is disputed with various versions being reported.

Later, he received a clean chit by a Delhi court in all four cases against him, although he was sentenced to life imprisonment for bomb blasts in Sonipat, Haryana.

== Early life ==
Born in 1943 at Chatta Lal Miya area in central Delhi's Dariyaganj area, he started his career as a carpenter at his native village in Bazaar Khurd area in Pilkhuwa in Uttar Pradesh's Ghaziabad district. He married for the first time in Uttar Pradesh. He came to Behrampura, Ahmedabad in 1982 and started carpentry and scrap business. He looked after a mosque and taught holy books to children. He married for the second time, Mumtaz and had a son, Irshaan after a year of a marriage. He returned to Delhi in 1989. He married for the third time an 18-year-old girl, at the age of 65 in Pakistan. He has 6 children.

== Later life ==
He came under the police radar after the Mumbai serial bombings in 1993. He got the moniker Tunda – Hindi/ Bengali (Bangla) for without a hand or physically handicapped- after his left hand got severed in an accident while preparing a bomb in 1985 in Mumbai. His younger brother Abdul Malik, who still is a carpenter, is reportedly the only immediate family member alive in India. He also stayed in Pakistan where he is known to have imparted training on the fabrication of IED and other explosives to mujahids who were sent to India from Pakistan for jihad. During his stay in Pakistan, he had been in touch with organisations like ISI, LeT, Jaish-e-Mohammed, Indian Mujahideen and Babbar Khalsa and had been meeting people like Hafiz Saeed, Maulana Masood Azhar, Zaki-ur-Rehman Lakhvi, Dawood Ibrahim and several others wanted by India. He used an elaborate network of human traffickers and fake currency suppliers active in Bangladesh. Tunda has also been associated with Rohingya operatives in the past. His association with LeT commanders Rehan alias Zafar and Azam Cheema alias Babaji is well known.

== Role in terrorism ==
After being indoctrinated by Pakistan's Inter-Services Intelligence (ISI) in the 1980s, Tunda became a jihadi at the age of 40. After allegedly masterminding 1993 Mumbai serial blasts, in 1994, he fled to Bangladesh where he taught making bombs to jihadi elements and in 1998, he acted as 'mentor' to give training to younger generation of Lashkar operatives in terror camps in Pakistan. In 1994, Tunda's name surfaced in Chhattisgarh Express bomb blast near Ghaziabad railway station that claimed 19 lives.

In 1994, Delhi Police and the intelligence bureau raided a home in the Ashok Nagar area after receiving a tip-off from sources but Tunda managed to escape before being nabbed. Security agencies found explosives, detonators, Pak made weapons and objectionable documents written in Urdu from his hideout in huge quantity. In 1996, an Interpol Red Corner notice was issued against Tunda. In 1997, after returning to India, he was involved in a bomb blast that took place near Punjabi Bagh in west Delhi in a Blueline bus that killed at least four people and injured around 24 people. It is believed that he died in a blast in Bangladesh in 2000 but Abdul Razzaq, an LeT operative arrested by the Delhi police in 2005, revealed about his presence in Pakistan. Tunda's name was on number 15 in a dossier of "most wanted terrorists" that India handed over to Pakistan after 26/11 Mumbai terror attacks. He is also believed to be guiding the banned Students Islamic Movement of India (SIMI), which later turned into Indian Mujahideen. Besides that, he was planning to 'recruit' Rohingyas from Myanmar to target Buddhists there.

He had tried to carry out serial explosions in Delhi just before the Commonwealth Games in 2010 but the plan was foiled as his accomplices were arrested. According to reports, it emerged that Tunda aims at carrying out blasts at crowded places and inflict maximum casualties. A close aide of underworld don Dawood Ibrahim, Jamaat-ud-Dawa chief Hafiz Mohammad Saeed and top LeT commander Zaki-ur-Rehman Lakhvi, an "expert bomb maker", Tunda was accused of masterminding over 40 cases of bomb blasts in Mumbai, Delhi, Uttar Pradesh, Haryana, Punjab, Hyderabad and Surat. Tunda was a prized catch by the Delhi police in the war against terror, who took shelter in various countries after fleeing India 20 years back. He had a major hand in spreading Laskhar-e-Taiba's network outside Jammu and Kashmir.

=== Arrest ===
The Special Cell of Delhi Police arrested 70 years old Tunda on 16 August 2013 in Uttarakhand's Banbasa area close to the Nepal border on the basis of an information provided by R&AW. He possessed a Pakistani passport issued on 23 January 2013. Arrested in 2013, he was taken to court. Tunda was sentenced to life imprisonment by a trial court in October 2017 for his involvement in the 1996 Sonepat bomb blasts in Haryana.

=== Health ===
He was admitted to AIIMS, New Delhi with health complications in August 2013. An angiography revealed blockages in vessels in his heart. Doctors implanted a pacemaker.

== See also ==
- List of terrorist incidents in India
- Pakistan and state sponsored terrorism
