= Sumeta Afzal Syed =

Pakistani politician

Member of the Provincial Assembly of Sindh
- In office June 2013 – 28 May 2018
- Constituency: Reserved seat for women

Personal details
- Born: 1 April 1987 (age 39) Karachi, Sindh, Pakistan
- Party: MQM-P (2025-present)
- Other political affiliations: PPP (2021-2025); PSP (2018-2021); MQM-L (2013-2018)

Sumeta Afzal Syed is a Pakistani politician who had been a Member of the Provincial Assembly of Sindh, from June 2013 to May 2018. She became the youngest female MPA at the age of 25 years in Sindh Assembly.

== Early life and education ==
She was born on 1 April 1987 in Karachi.

She has earned the degree of Bachelor of Arts and Social Sciences and Humanities (Major: Psychology, Minor: Special Education).

She did her Masters in Social Work from University of Houston.

== Political career ==
She was elected to the Provincial Assembly of Sindh as a candidate of Muttahida Qaumi Movement (MQM) on a reserved seat for women in the 2013 Pakistani general election.

She quit MQM in April 2018 and joined Pak Sarzameen Party.

She joined Pakistan People's Party in March 2021 and from then she is Advisor Sustainable Development Goals Task Force, Sindh till August 2023.

On 13 May 2024, the Election Commission of Pakistan (ECP) suspended her membership as a member of the Provincial Assembly of the Sindh. This action followed a Supreme Court of Pakistan decision to suspend the verdict of the Peshawar High Court, which had denied the allocation of a reserved seat to the PTI-Sunni Ittehad Council bloc.
