= Khadim's =

Indian footwear company

Khadim India Limited
- Type: Public
- Traded as: NSE: KHADIM; BSE: 540775
- ISIN: INE834I01025
- Industry: Footwear
- Founded: 1981; 45 years ago
- Founder: Satya Prasad Roy Burman
- Headquarters: Kolkata, West Bengal, India
- Area served: Worldwide
- Key people: Siddhartha Roy Burman (Chairman and MD)
- Products: Footwear; Handbags
- Number of employees: 3000
- Website: www.khadims.com

Khadim India Limited, doing business as Khadim's, is an Indian multinational footwear company, based in Kolkata. It is involved in the manufacture and retail of footwear products and accessories, primarily in eastern and southern parts of India.

Khadim's traces its roots to KM Khadim & Company, a footwear store in Chitpur, Kolkata, which was acquired by Satya Prasad Roy Burman in 1965. Khadim's was incorporated in 1981 and remained a wholesale business until 1993 when it opened its first retail store in Kolkata. It expanded operations in east and northeast India, before opening its first store in south India in 2000. At the time of its initial public offer in 2017, the company had 853 retail stores, and ranked second on the list of footwear companies by number of store locations in India. It has two manufacturing locations, in Kolkata and Kanpur.

In 2019, Khadim's established a wholly owned subsidiary in Bangladesh called Khadim Shoe Bangladesh Limited.

In 2022, Khadim India Limited onboarded cricketer Shardul Thakur as brand ambassador.

== See also ==
- Khadim's case
