= Maulana Bashir Ahmad Sialvi =

- Born: 1948
- Died: 25 March 2014 (aged 65–66)
- Education: Jamia Razvia, Faisalabad
- Occupations: Spiritual & religious Leader of the Qadiriyya; Ahle Sunnat Sufis in Pakistan

Maulana Bashir Ahmed Sialvi (1948– 25 March 2014) was a prominent Sunni scholar and Imam from Pakistan who lead many Ahle Sunnat organisations of Pakistan and served Islam throughout his life. He was born in Chak 164 Shekhan, Gojra, Pakistan. His father Molvi Haji Ilam Dean Sialvi was one of the first settlers to this area after migration from India. He was a prominent member of the Sufi-Sunni Ulemas and Mushaikhs in Pakistan and United States.

== Early life ==
- Received early religious education at Bucheki, Pakistan with Maulana Syed Hasan Sialvi.
- Transferred to Jamia Razvia, Faisalabad at the age of 13 and completed his Islamic education.
- Served as an Imam at Jamia Masjid Madina, Hajvery Town, Faisalabad from 1954 to 1991.

== Career ==
- A prominent Mureed of Khwaja Qamar ul Din Sialvi of Sial Sharif, and an important figure in the Tehreek-e-Khatme Nabuwwat of 1970's and 1980's.
- Served as the president of Jamaat Ahle Sunnat, Faisalabad chapter.
- Served a local assemblyman (Counselor in Pakistan) in 1987–1991. Changed the town's name from "Mai de Chugi" to Hajvery Town.
- Active religious and social worker with other prominent Sunni-Barelvi Ulamas, such as, Sahibzada Haji Muhammad Fazal Karim, Syed Shabbir Hussain Shah, Sahibzada Pir Syed Qazi, Fazal-Rasul Haider, Maulana Bagh Ali Rizvi and Maulana Abdul Hanan Sialvi.
- Well known for holding hundreds of Milad-un-Nabi (The Birthday Celebration of Muhammad) programs all across the USA 1991-2014. The most famous was the annual parade and conference celebrating the birthday of Muhammed, that he held at the California State Capital, Sacramento since the 11 September 2001 attacks.
- President of the Jamaat Ahle Sunnat.
- Served as an Imam at the Woodland Mosque and Islamic Center from 1991 to 2000.

Death:

- Died on 25 March 2014, 23 Jamad-ul-Awal, 1435, in his home in Hajvery Town, Faisalabad due to a sudden heart attack. His funeral prayer was attended by hundreds of prominent Ulamas and Mushaikhs including Sahibzada Fazal-E-Rasul Haideri Rizvi, in Sunni Rizvi Masjid, Faisalabad.
- His grave is in Chak no. 164, Shekhan, near Gojra, Pakistan.
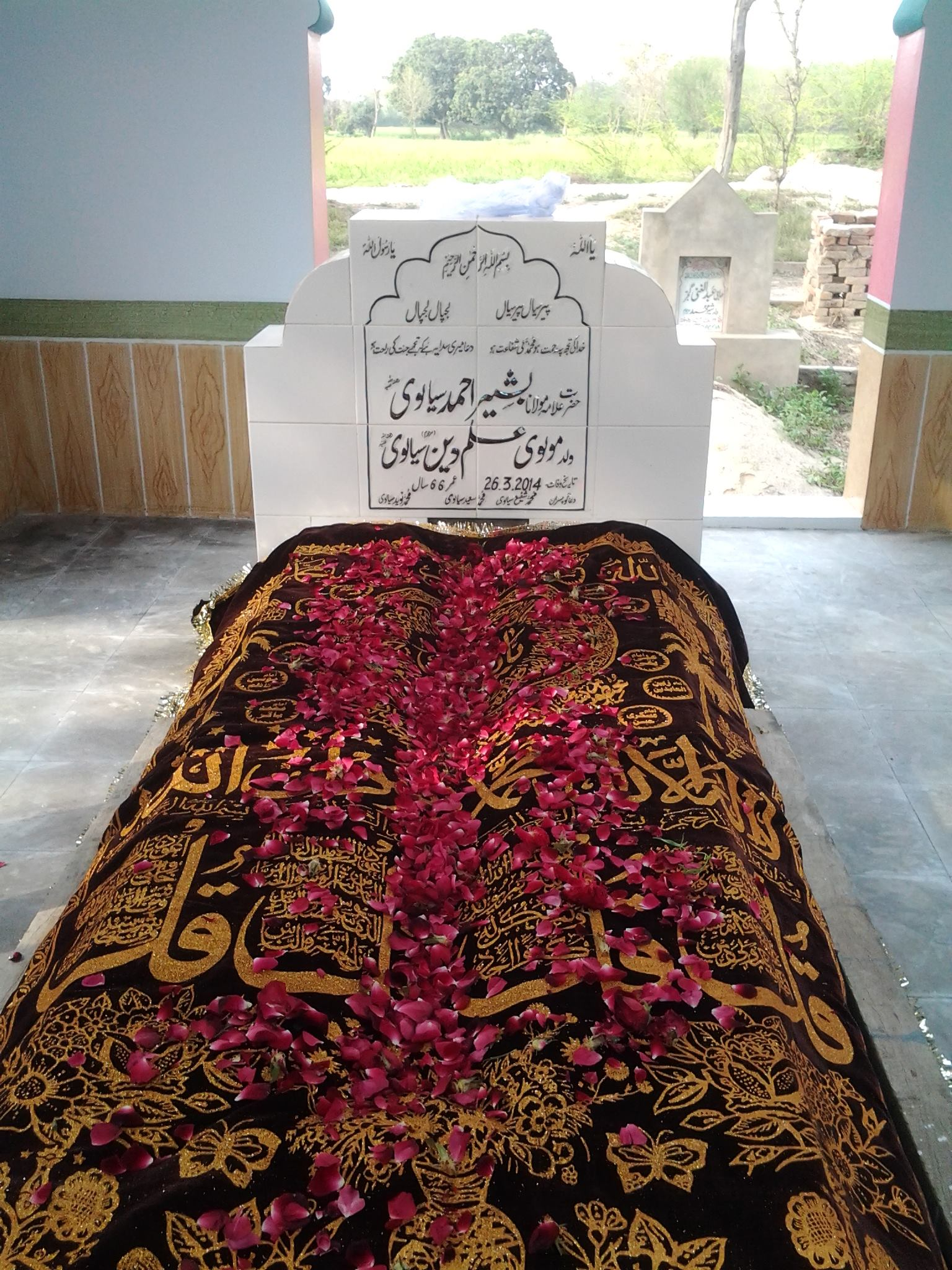
Darbar
