= Shishir Gupta =

Shishir Gupta is Executive Editor of the Hindustan Times. He is author of The Himalayan Face-off : Chinese Assertion and Indian Riposte, published by Hachette (India) in March 2014.

Gupta is also the author of the book The Indian Mujahideen : The Enemy Within, published by Hachette in July 2011.
