= Khidmat-e-Khalq Foundation =

Pakistani charitable organisation

- خدمت خلق فاؤنڈیشن
- Formation: 1978; 48 years ago
- Region served: Pakistan
- Affiliations: MQM-P

Khidmat-e-Khalq Foundation (KKF) (Urdu: خدمت خلق فاؤنڈیشن) is a Pakistani charitable organisation that provides aid to Pakistan's poor under the jurisdiction of the MQM-P.

== Services ==
KKF runs welfare hospitals, ambulance service & hearses across Pakistan. It provides services through mobile dispensaries and field hospitals. It established medical camps in the month of Moharram. KKF offers monthly distribution of financial aid. The foundation provides dowries to girls. During Ramadan KKF offer additional aid. With the help of MQM, KKF provides legal assistance.

KKF was supporting earthquake victims and during the floods, they support victims with food and necessities. In June–July 2015, they support the victims of Heat Strokes. They arranged anti-Heat Strokes camps all over in Karachi.
