= Jamia Salafia, Faisalabad =

Islamic education institution

Jamia Salafia, Faisalabad (جامعہ سلفیہ فیصل آباد) is an Islamic education institution in Faisalabad Pakistan. It was established on 4 April 1955 by Maulana Dawood Ghaznavi and Muhammad Ismail Salafi
