= Terrorism in India =

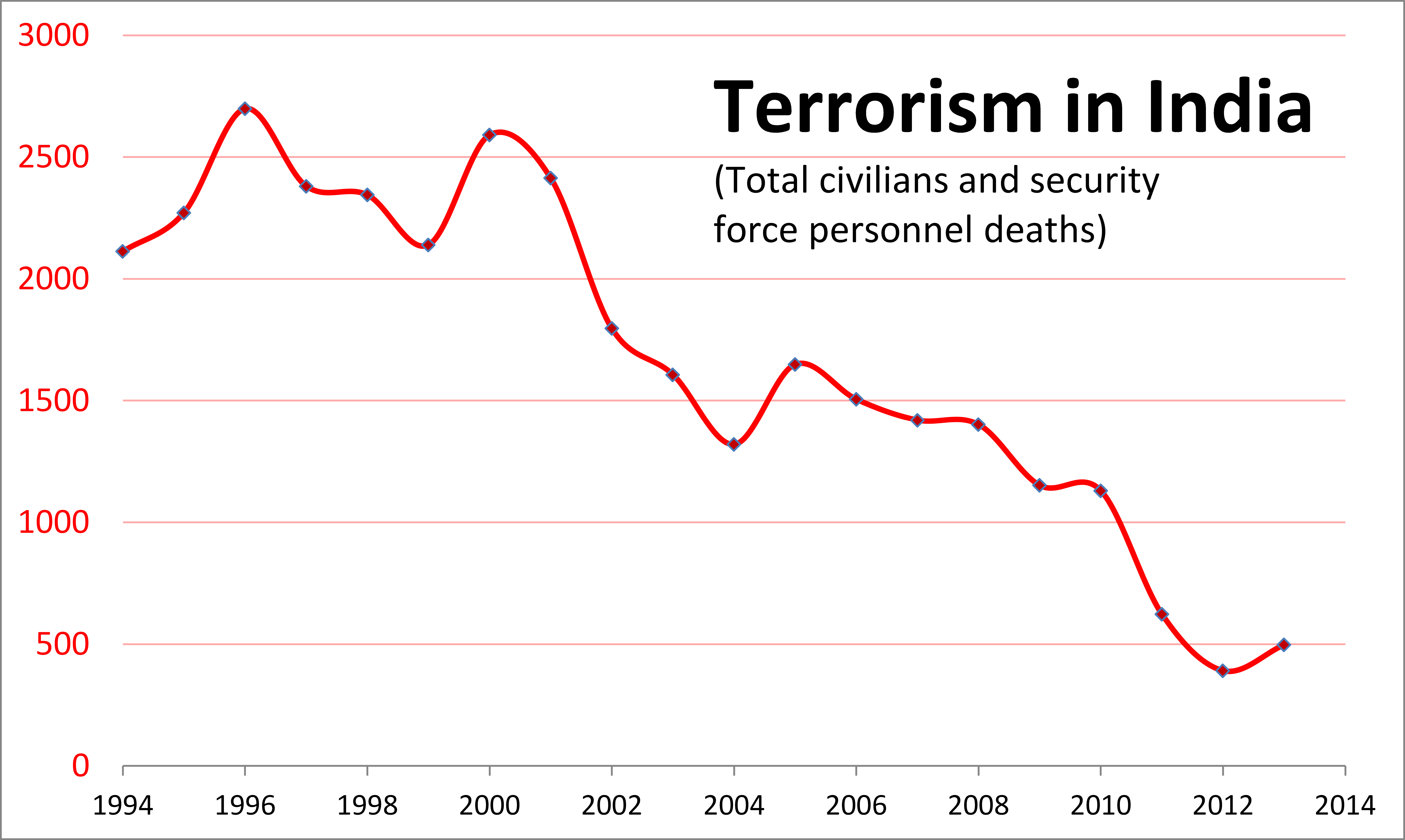
Terrorism trend in India – Terror attack caused civilian and security personnel deaths per year from 1994 to 2013.

Terrorist incidents in India
Year	Number of incidents	Deaths	Injuries
2017	966	465	702
2016	1,025	467	788
2015	884	387	649
2014	860	490	776
2013	694	467	771
2012	611	264	651
2011	645	499	730
2010	663	812	660
2009	672	774	854
2008	534	824	1,759
2007	149	626	1,187
2006	167	722	2,138
2005	146	466	1,216
2004	108	334	949
2003	196	472	1,183
2002	184	599	1,186
2001	234	660	1,144
2000	180	671	761
1999	112	469	591
1998	61	398	411
1997	193	853	1,416
1996	213	569	952
1995	179	361	616
1994	107	389	405
1993	42	525	1,564
1992	237	1,152	917
1991	339	1,113	1,326
1990	349	907	1,042
1989	324	874	769
1988	358	966	1,033
1987	166	506	429
1986	96	340	163
1985	39	51	79
1984	159	195	364
1983	47	59	217
1982	13	64	102
1981	16	24	12
1980	10	17	13
1979	20	31	19
1978	0	0	0
1977	1	0	0
1976	1	0	0
1975	1	4	0
1974	0	0	0
1973	0	0	0
1972	1	0	0
1971	0	0	0
1970	0	0	0
Total	12,002	19,866	30,544

Terrorist incidents in South Asia (1970–2016).

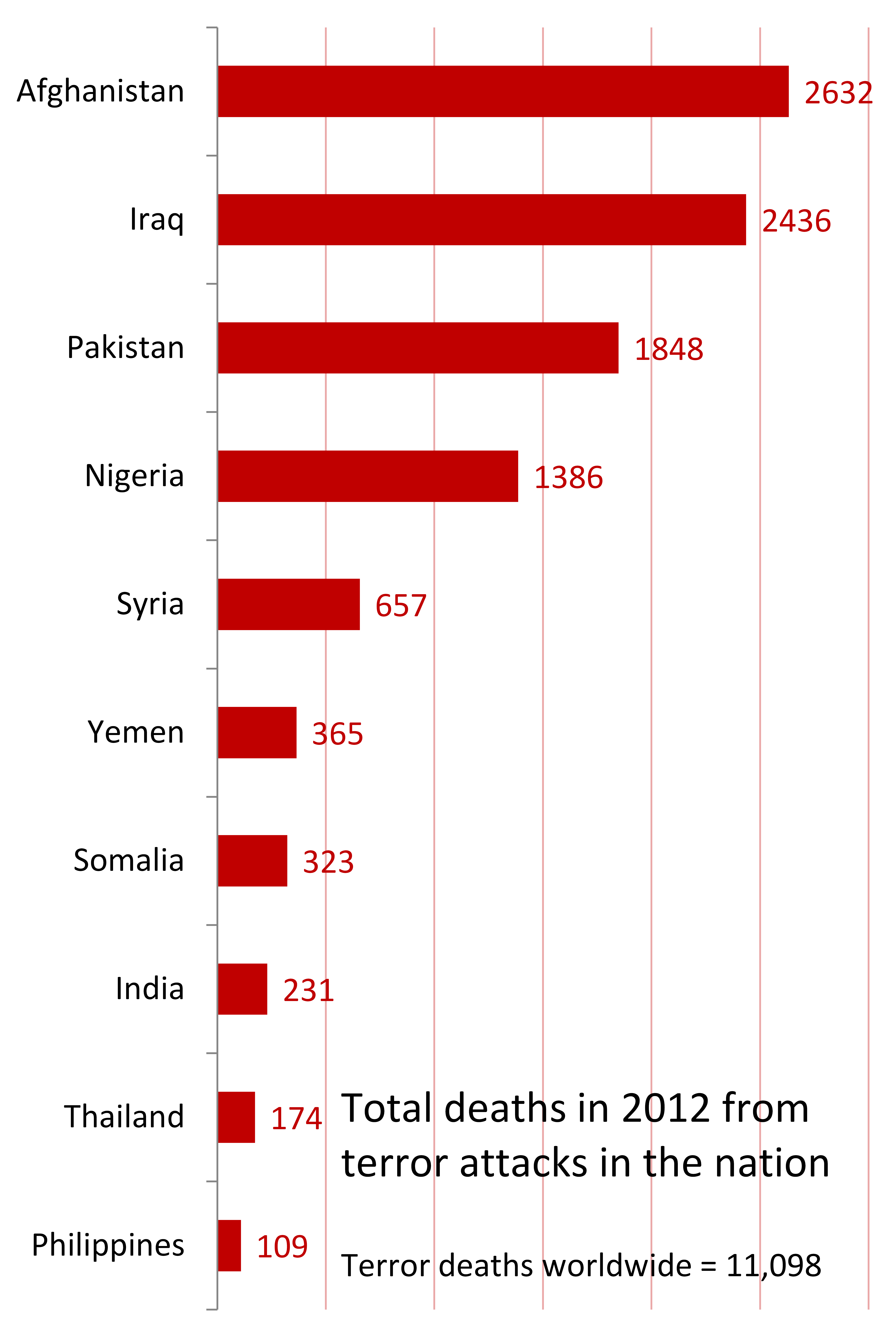
2012 US State Department figures on the total civilian deaths by terror attacks in India and other countries.

Terrorism in India, according to the Ministry of Home Affairs, poses a significant threat to the people of India. Compared to other countries, India faces a wide range of terror groups. Terrorism found in India includes Islamist terrorism, ultranationalist terrorism, and left-wing terrorism. India is one of the countries most impacted by terrorism.

A common definition of terrorism is the systematic use or threatened use of violence to intimidate a population or government for political, religious, or ideological goals.

In 2022, India ranked 13th on the Global Terrorism Index. India continues to face a number of terror attacks from Islamist separatist groups in Kashmir, Sikh separatists in Punjab, and secessionist groups in Assam. The regions with long term terrorist activities have been Jammu and Kashmir, east-central and south-central India (Naxalism) and the Seven Sister States. In August 2008, National Security Advisor M K Narayanan said that as many as 800 terrorist cells are operating in the country. As of 2013, 205 of the country's 608 districts were affected by terrorist activity. Terror attacks caused 231 civilian deaths in 2012 in India, compared to 11,098 terror-caused deaths worldwide, according to the State Department of the United States; or about 2% of global terror fatalities while it accounts for 17.5% of the global population.

Reports have alleged and implicated terrorism in India to be sponsored by Pakistan. In July 2016, the Government of India released data on a string of terror strikes in India since 2005 that claimed 707 lives and left over 3,200 injured.

== Definition ==
The 8th report on terrorism in India published in 2008 defined terrorism as the peacetime equivalent of war crime. An act of terror in India includes any intentional act of violence that causes death, injury or property damage, induces fear, and is targeted against any group of people identified by their political, philosophical, ideological, racial, ethnic, religious or any other nature. This description is similar to one provided by the United Nations' in 2000.

The Indian government uses the following working definition of terrorism, same as one widely used by Western nations as well as the United Nations, proposed by Schmid and Jongman in 1988.

Terrorism is an anxiety-inspiring method of repeated violent action, employed by (semi-) clandestine individual, group or state actors, for idiosyncratic, criminal or political reasons, whereby the direct targets of violence are not the main targets. The immediate human victims of violence are generally chosen randomly (targets of opportunity) or selectively (representative or symbolic targets) from a target population, and serve as message generators. Threat and violence-based communication processes between terrorist organisation, victims, and main targets are used to manipulate the main target (audience(s)), turning it into a target of terror, a target of demands, or a target of attention, depending on whether intimidation, coercion, or propaganda is primarily sought.

— Alex Schmid and Albert Jongman

India subdivides terrorism into four major groups:

1. Ethno-nationalist terrorism – This form of terror focuses either (a) on creating a separate State within India or independent of India or in a neighboring country, or (b) on emphasising the views/response of one ethnic group against another. Violent Tamil Nationalist groups from India to address the condition of Tamils in Sri Lanka, as well as insurgent tribal groups in North East India are examples of ethno-nationalist terrorist activities.
2. Religious terrorism – This form of terror focuses on religious imperatives, a presumed duty or in solidarity for a specific religious group, against one or more religious groups. The Mumbai 26/11 terror attack in 2008 from an Islamist group in Pakistan is an example of religious terrorism in India. The examples are Hindu terrorism, Islamic terrorism, Right-wing terrorism, etc.
3. Left-wing terrorism – This form of terror focuses on economic ideology, where all the existing socio-political structures are seen to be economically exploitative in character and a revolutionary change through violent means is essential. The ideology of Marx, Engel, Mao, Lenin and others is considered as the only valid economic path. Maoist violence in Jharkhand and Chhattisgarh are examples of left wing terrorism in India.
4. Narcoterrorism – This form of terror focuses on creating illegal narcotics traffic zones. Drug violence in northwest India is an example of narco-terrorism in India.

== Terror groups operating in India ==
SATP (South Asia Terrorism Portal) has listed 180 terrorist groups that have operated within India over the last 20 years, many of them co-listed as transnational terror networks operating in or from neighboring South Asian countries such as Bangladesh, Nepal and Pakistan. Of these, 38 are on the current list of terrorist organisations banned by India under its First Schedule of the UA(P) Act, 1967. As of 2012, many of these were also listed and banned by the United States and European Union.

== List of attacks ==
=== Andhra Pradesh ===
==== 2000 Church bombings of South India ====
The 2000 Church bombings refers to the serial bombings of churches in the southern Indian states of Karnataka, Goa and Andhra Pradesh by the Islamist extremist group Deendar Anjuman in the year 2000. On 21 May 2000, a Christian congregation at Machilipatnam, Andhra Pradesh was bombed. On 8 July 2000, two churches were bombed in Andhra Pradesh, Gewett Memorial Baptist Church in Ongole and the Mother Vannini Catholic Church in Tadepalligudem town. The blast in the Ongole church injured three persons.

==== Kurnool train crash ====
A passenger train derailed in Kurnool district in Andhra Pradesh, on 21 December 2002. During the repair, it was discovered that one of the railway tracks had been deliberately severed, which caused the derailment. Later reports agreed that the crash was caused by sabotage. Thirteen months after the attack, police in Hyderabad arrested a man named Syed Abdul Nayeem, a Lashkar-e-Taiba activist, who failed a 'brainwave fingerprinting test' after being questioned by Indian police. He was charged both in this case and a bombing which killed two people in the Sai Baba Temple.

=== Assam ===
After Nagaland, Assam is the most volatile state in the region. Beginning in 1979, the indigenous people of Assam demanded that the illegal immigrants who had emigrated from Bangladesh to Assam be detected and deported. The movement led by the All Assam Students Union began non-violently with satyagraha, boycotts, picketing, and courting arrests.

Those protesting frequently came under police action. In 1983 an election was conducted, which was opposed by the movement leaders. The election led to widespread violence. The movement finally ended after the movement leaders signed an agreement (called the Assam Accord) with the central government on 15 August 1985.

Under the provisions of this accord, anyone who entered the state illegally between January 1966 and March 1971 was allowed to remain but was disenfranchised for ten years, while those who entered after 1971 faced expulsion. A November 1985 amendment to the Indian citizenship law allows non-citizens who entered Assam between 1961 and 1971 to have all the rights of citizenship except the right to vote for ten years.

New Delhi also gave special administration autonomy to the Bodos in the state. However, the Bodos demanded a separate Bodoland, which led to a clash between the Bengalis, the Bodos, and the Indian military resulting in hundreds of deaths.

Several organisations advocate the independence of Assam. The most prominent of these is the United Liberation Front of Asom (ULFA). Formed in 1979, the ULFA has two main goals: the independence of Assam and the establishment of a socialist government.

The ULFA has carried out several terrorist attacks in the region targeting the Indian Military and non-combatants. The group assassinates political opponents, attacks police and other security forces, blasts railroad tracks, and attacks other infrastructure facilities. The ULFA is believed to have strong links with the Nationalist Socialist Council of Nagaland (NSCN), Maoists, and the Naxalites.

It is also believed that they carry out most of their operations from the Kingdom of Bhutan. Because of ULFA's increased visibility, the Indian government outlawed the group in 1986 and declared Assam a troubled area. Under pressure from New Delhi, Bhutan carried out a massive operation to drive out the ULFA militants from its territory.

Backed by the Indian Army, Thimphu was successful in killing more than a thousand terrorists and extraditing many more to India while sustaining only 120 casualties. The Indian military undertook several successful operations aimed at countering future ULFA terrorist attacks, but the ULFA continues to be active in the region. In 2004, the ULFA targeted a public school in Assam, killing 19 children and 5 adults.

Assam remains the only state in the northeast where terrorism is still a major issue. On 18 September 2005, a soldier was killed in Jiribam, Manipur, near the Manipur-Assam border, by members of the ULFA. On 14 March 2011, Bodo militants of the Ranjan Daimary-led faction ambushed patrolling troops of BSF when on their way from Bangladoba in the Chirang district of Assam to Ultapani in Kokrajhar killing 8 jawans.

On 5 August 2016, a terrorist attack was reported in the market area of Balajan Tinali of the city of Kokrajhar that resulted in the death of 14 civilians and injuries to 15 others. Three terrorists, suspected to be Bodo militants, were reported to have attacked using AK-47 and a grenade. OP Singh. Director General of Police said in a press conference the terrorist from the Hizbul Mujahideen group arrested in the city of Kanpur was Qamar-uz-Zama. He is 37 years old and is a resident of Assam.

==== Brahmaputra Express Train bombing ====
The Brahmaputra Express Train bombing was a terrorist attack on a train travelling in Western Assam in Eastern India on 30 December 1996. Most of the passengers were believed to be vacationers heading for Delhi to celebrate the New Year. The train was carrying an estimated 1,200 passengers. Police in Kokrajhar said a bomb planted on the rails went off shortly after the New Delhi-bound Brahmaputra Express left Kokrajhar in the jungle terrain of Assam state. "The blast took place at 7:15 p.m., a few minutes after the train left the Kokrajhar station for New Delhi." police said. The train's engine and its first coach car were derailed by the blast, and the next three rail cars were severely damaged, an official said. The bomb totally wrecked three carriages of the train and derailed six more, killing at least 33 people. No one has claimed responsibility, though the separatist Bodo rebel faction was believed to be involved.

==== 2004 Dhemaji school bombing ====
On the occasion of Independence Day, 15 August 2004, people, mostly were school children and their mothers, gathered at Dhemaji College ground for an Independence Day parade. At around 09:30 am, a bomb went off killing 18 schoolchildren and injuring 40. According to police, the bomb was planted near the college gate and triggered by a remote-controlled device. It exploded when the students and teachers of various schools were passing through the gate. Police blamed ULFA, a banned Assamese militant group, which had initially called for a boycott of the event. But on 13 December 2009, Paresh Barua, the C-in-C of the group, sought public apology and forgiveness for the blast. He stated in an e-mail that the ULFA leadership was misled by some of their cadres and junior leaders about the blast, which is why the leadership had to deny its involvement.

=== Delhi ===
==== 1996 Lajpat Nagar Blast ====
A bomb blast occurred in Lajpat Nagar market in Delhi on 21 May 1996, killing 13 civilians and injuring 38 others. The blast was followed a day later by the 1996 Dausa blast. Six members of the militant organisation Jammu Kashmir Islamic Front were convicted for the blasts. A police investigation discovered that the bombers were in close contact with the Pakistani Inter-Services Intelligence. In April 2012, the court awarded a death sentence to Mohammed Naushad, Mohammed Ali Bhatt and Mirza Nissar Hussain. Javed Ahmed Khan was sentenced to life imprisonment, while Farooq Ahmed Khan and Farida Dar were released by the court, adding that their imprisonment served during the trial was their punishment. In November 2012, the Delhi High Court acquitted Mohammed Ali Bhatt and Mirza Nissar Hussain and commuted the death penalty of Mirza Nissar Hussain to life imprisonment.

==== 2001 Attack on Indian parliament ====
Terrorists on 13 December 2001 attacked the Parliament of India, resulting in a 45-minute gun battle in which 9 policemen and parliament staff were killed. All five terrorists were also killed by the security forces and were identified as Pakistani nationals. The attack occurred around 11:40 am (IST), minutes after both Houses of Parliament had adjourned for the day. The suspected terrorists dressed in commando fatigues entered Parliament in a car through the VIP gate of the building. Displaying Parliament and Home Ministry security stickers, the vehicle entered the Parliament premises. The terrorists set off massive blasts and used AK-47 rifles, explosives, and grenades for the attack. Senior Ministers and over 200 members of parliament were inside the Central Hall of Parliament when the attack took place. Security personnel sealed the entire premises, which saved many lives.

==== 2005 Delhi bombings ====
Three explosions went off in the Indian capital of New Delhi on 29 October 2005, which killed more than 67 people and injured at least 200. It was followed by four bomb blasts on 13 September 2008.

==== 2011 High court bombing ====
The 2011 Delhi bombing took place in the Indian capital Delhi on Wednesday, 7 September 2011 at 10:14 local time outside Gate No. 5 of the Delhi High Court, where a suspected briefcase bomb was planted. The blast killed 12 people and injured 76.

==== 2025 Delhi car explosion ====
On 10 November 2025, a car exploded near the Red Fort in Delhi, India, killing at least 13 people and injuring more than twenty others. According to early police assessments, ammonium nitrate fuel oil and other explosives were used in the vehicle, which triggered the blast that damaged multiple nearby vehicles. It is alleged that it is a terrorist attack.

=== Haryana ===
==== 1987 Lalru Bus Massacre ====
1987 Lalru bus massacre was a massacre of 38 Hindus by Khalistani Sikh terrorists. It occurred on 6 July 1987 at Lalru, presently in Mohali District, when a bus going from Dhilwan in Kapurthala district to Jalandhar was attacked by Sikh militants in which thirty eight Hindu passengers were dragged out of the bus by the militants and then shot dead in Lalru in the northern state of Punjab. The goal of the terrorists behind the massacre was to drive out the 7 million Hindus living in Punjab and force the Sikhs living outside of the Punjab state to move in. This would have enabled the Sikh separatists to claim the Punjab state as a sovereign country of Khalistan.

=== Himachal Pradesh ===
==== Chamba massacre of 1998 ====
The 1998 Chamba massacre was the killing of thirty-five Hindus by Hizbul Mujahideen, in the Chamba district of Himachal Pradesh in India on 3 August 1998.

=== Jammu, Kashmir, and Ladakh ===
==== 2000 Amarnath pilgrimage massacre ====
August 2000, Kashmir massacre on 1 and 2 August was the massacre of at least 89 Hindu pilgrims (official count) to 105 (as reported by PTI) and injury to at least 62 people, in at least five different coordinated attacks by Kashmiri separatist militants in Anantnag district and Doda district of Kashmir Valley in India.

==== 2025 RSC battle ====
On 28 March 2025, a gun battle in the Kathua district of Jammu, India-administered Kashmir, resulted in the deaths of four police officers and two suspected terrorists. The clash occurred in a forested area near India's border with Pakistan, following an ambush of a police patrol. The Indian army's Rising Star Corps reported the elimination of the two rebels, with recovered arms, ammunition, and military equipment.

==== 2025 Pahalgam attack ====
The 2025 Pahalgam attack was an attack on non-Muslim tourists by five armed militants near Pahalgam in the Indian-administered Jammu and Kashmir in which 26 civilians were killed on 22 April 2025. The militants mainly targeted Hindu tourists, which were singled out by checking their names and by recitation of the Islamic kalima. It was initially discovered that one of the terrorists, Hashim Musa, was a former regular of Pakistan Army's Para Forces who was dismissed from the forces for his links to Lashkar-e-Taiba (LeT). In June 2025, Indian investigators said all three militants involved in the attack were Pakistani nationals from the UN-proscribed terrorist group LeT.

=== Karnataka ===
==== 2008 Bangalore Serial Blasts ====
The 2008 Bangalore serial blasts occurred on 25 July 2008 in Bangalore, India. A series of nine bombs exploded in which two people were killed and 20 injured. According to the Bangalore City Police, the blasts were caused by low-intensity crude bombs triggered by timers.

==== 2010 Bangalore Stadium Bombing ====
The 2010 Bangalore stadium bombing occurred on 17 April 2010 in M. Chinnaswamy Stadium, Bangalore, India. Two bombs exploded in a heavily packed Cricket stadium in which fifteen people were injured. A third bomb was found and defused outside the stadium.

=== Kerala ===
==== 2005 Kalamassery bus burning case ====
The NIA court sentences two people to 7 years in jail. The people had assembled on 8 September 2005 at Aluva Masjid and chalked out their plan, at the instance and instigation of accused Majid Parambai and Sufia, to set fire to a Tamil Nadu government owned bus.

==== 2006 Kozhikode twin blast case ====
The explosions occurred at the two bus stations on Mavoor Road within a gap of 10 minutes in the afternoon of 3 March. Explosions were triggered by timer devices. Two persons, including a police officer, were injured in the blasts. Initially, it was investigated by a special police team and the Crime Branch. NIA took over the case in 2009. Nazeer was arrested in 2009 from the India-Bangladesh border in Meghalaya.

==== 2010 Assault on T. J. Joseph ====
The assault of T. J. Joseph occurred on 4 July 2010 at Muvattupuzha near Nirmala College in the Ernakulam district of Kerala, India. T. J. Joseph, a professor of Malayalam at Newman College, Thodupuzha, a Christian minority institution affiliated with Mahatma Gandhi University had his hand cut off at the wrist on allegation of blasphemy according to Quran verses, by members of Popular Front of India, an Islamist organisation in India. The then Minister of Home Affairs of Kerala, Kodiyeri Balakrishnan, made a statement that while government is aware that there is a local Dar-ul Khada set up by the Popular Front of India under the supervision of the All India Muslim Personal Law Board, functioning to resolve civil disputes, there were no complaints received that it was passing "Taliban-model" orders.

==== ISIS recruitment incidents in Kerala ====
2015: In 2015, Nimisha alias Fathima, a resident of Thiruvananthapuram, along with her husband Isa Bexin Vincent, left India from Kerala with a group of 21 from Kerala and joined ISIS. Nimisha, a Hindu converted to Islam with her husband. They both worked for ISIS in Afghanistan and in Syria, and her husband died while working with the Islamist terrorist organization ISIS in Afghanistan.

2021: NIA filed chargesheet against 8 alleged ISIS terrorists for radicalizing, recruiting, organizing funds and grooming gullible Muslim youths from Kerala through different secured social media platforms to join global Islamist terrorist organizations. Deepthi Marla, Muhammad Waqar Lone, Mizha Sidheeque, Shifa Haris, Obaid Hamid Matta, Madesh Shankar, Ammar Abdul Rahiman and Muzamil Hassan Bhat were named in the charge sheet.

2021: Chief Minister of Kerala Pinarayi Vijayan revealed that around 100 people from Kerala had joined ISIS till 2019. 94 out of 100 are Muslims and the rest 6 are converted to Islam from Hindu and Christian religions in Kerala.

2022: Najeeb Ali, a 23 year old engineering student who came from Kerala was killed in a suicide attack in Afghanistan.

2022: Voice of Khorasan, the Mouthpiece of IS in Afghanistan and the surrounding area, earlier introduced a story about Abu Bakr Al Hindi, "who was born in Kerala in a Christian family, converted to Islam by his Kerala Muslim friends when he was working at Middle east". He was killed while fighting for the Islamic State (IS) in Libya. He was an engineer by profession and joined IS when working at Gulf.

==== 2022 Ban on Popular Front of India ====
On 28 September 2022, with the inputs from intelligence agencies and evidence collected from NIA, central government banned Kerala based terror organization Popular Front of India. Bombay High Court ruled that popular front of India aims to transform 'India into an Islamic country by 2047'.

==== 2023 Kalamassery Blast Case ====
On 29 October 2023, a series of improvised explosive device (IED) blasts took place during a convention of Jehovah's Witnesses in Kalamassery, a suburb of Kochi, India. Five women, two men, and a child were killed and more than fifty other people were injured when the group was holding a Sunday morning session of their annual regional convention. Dominic Martin, a 57-year-old shortly surrendered at the Kodakara police station, claiming to be responsible for the blast. The motive of the blast is still under investigation.

=== Maharashtra ===
==== Mumbai ====
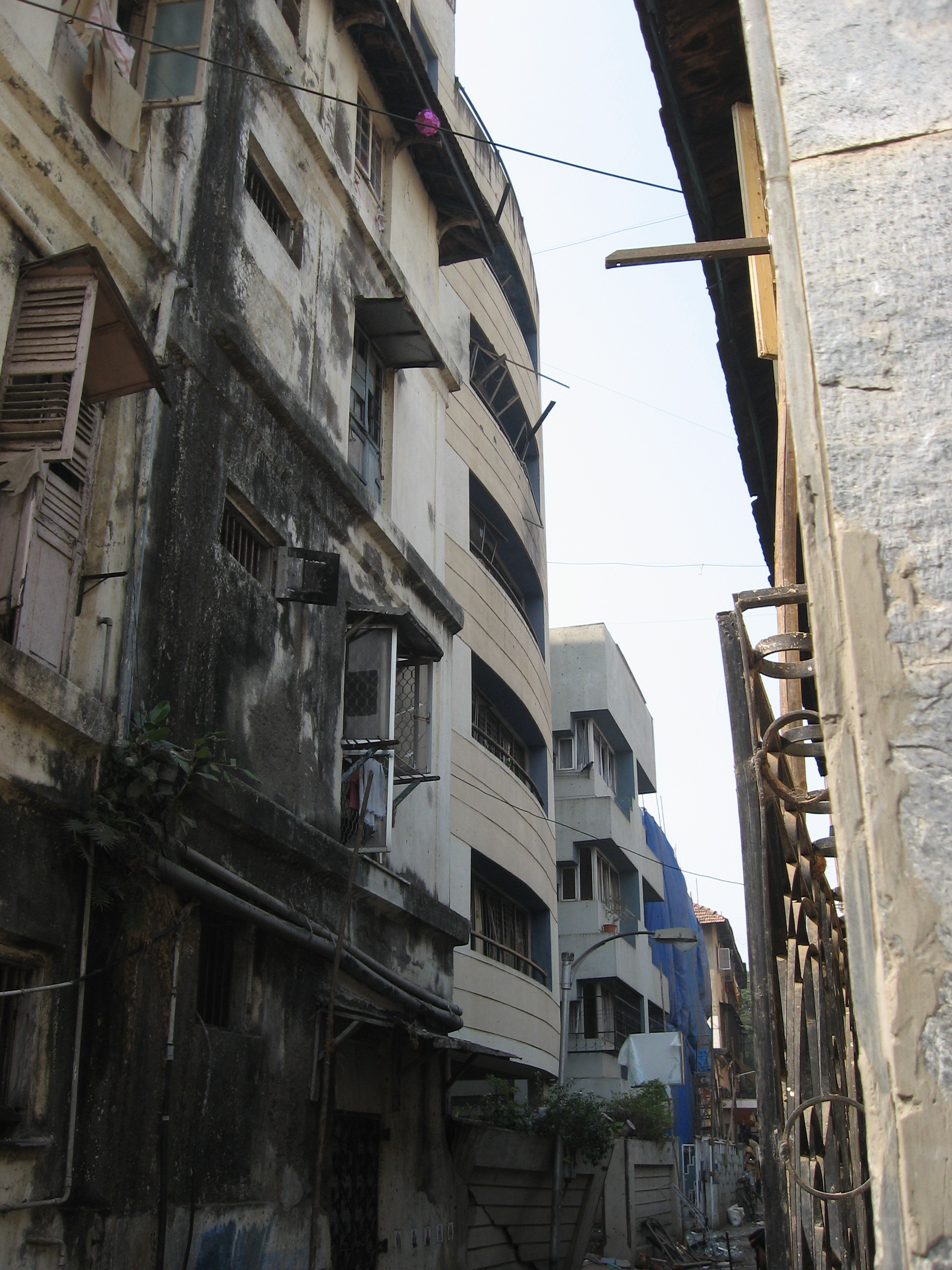
Nariman House, a Jewish center in Mumbai, after 26/11 terror attack in 2008. Six Jews were killed there, along with 158 people of other faiths elsewhere in Mumbai by terrorists.

Mumbai has been a common target for terrorist organisations, many operating with a base from Pakistan. Over the past few years there have been a series of attacks, including explosions in Mumbai Suburban trains in July 2006, and the attacks of 26 November 2008, when two of the prime hotels, a landmark train station, and a Jewish Chabad house, in South Mumbai, were attacked and sieged.

Terrorist attacks in Mumbai include:

- 12 March 1993 – 12 bombs killed 257
- 6 December 2002 – A Bus bomb in Ghatkopar, killed 2
- 27 January 2003 – Bicycle bomb in Vile Parle, killed 1
- 13 March 2003 – A train bomb in Mulund killed 10
- 28 July 2003 – A Bus bomb in Ghatkopar, killed 4
- 25 August 2003 – Two Bombs near the Gateway of India and Zaveri Bazaar, killed 50
- 11 July 2006 – Seven train bombs killed 209
- 26 November 2008 to 29 November 2008 – Coordinated series of attacks, killed 172.
- 13 July 2011 – Bomb explosions at three locations, killed 26

==== Pune ====
- 13 February 2010 – a bomb explosion at the German Bakery killed 17 people, and injured 64 others.
- 1 August 2012 – four bomb explosion at various locations on JM Road injured 1 person.

==== 1991 Kalyan Train Bomb Blast ====
On 8 November 1991, a bomb exploded on a train when it reached Kalyan Junction railway station. Twelve people were killed and 65 injured in the explosion. Ravinder Singh, alias "Bittu" who was linked to the Babbar Khalsa, a Sikh militant organization was convicted in the case.

==== 1993 Bombay bombings ====
A series of 12 terrorist bombings took place in Mumbai, then known as Bombay, on 12 March 1993. The attacks resulted in 257 fatalities and 1,400 injuries.

At 13:30 hours on 12 March 1993, a powerful car bomb exploded in the basement of the Bombay Stock Exchange building. The 28-story office building was severely damaged and many nearby office buildings also suffered damage. Reports indicate that 50 were killed by this explosion. About 30 minutes later, another car bomb exploded in front of the Mandvi branch of Corporation Bank near Masjid. From 13:30 hours to 15:40 hours a total of 12 bombs exploded throughout Mumbai. Most of the bombs were car bombs but some were in scooters. Three hotels – the Hotel Sea Rock, Hotel Juhu Centaur, and Hotel Airport Centaur – were targeted by suitcase bombs left in rooms booked by the perpetrators. Banks, the regional passport office, the Air India Building, and a major shopping complex were also hit. Bombs exploded at Zaveri Bazaar and opposite it a jeep-bomb exploded at the Century Bazaar. Grenades were thrown at Sahar International Airport and at Fishermen's Colony, apparently targeting certain citizens at the latter. A double-decker bus was very badly damaged in the deadliest explosion, with as many as 90 people killed.

On 10 July 2006, the Chief Minister of Maharashtra, Sharad Pawar, admitted that he had "deliberately misled" people following the 1993 Mumbai bombings by saying there were "13 and not 12" explosions and had added the name of a Muslim-dominated locality to show that people from both communities had been affected. He attempted to justify this deception by claiming that it was a move to prevent communal riots by falsely portraying that both Hindu and Muslim communities in the city had been affected adversely. He also admitted to lying about evidence recovered and misleading people into believing that it pointed to the Tamil Tigers as possible suspects.

=== Manipur ===
Like its sister states in Northeast, Manipur has experienced years of insurgency and inter-ethnic violence while it was part of Assam and sought more rights. The state joined India on 21 September 1949, when Maharaja Budhachandra signed a Treaty of Accession merging the kingdom into India; this merger was disputed by various groups in Manipur as having been completed without consensus and under duress. Manipur was part of Assam after 1949, became a Union Territory in 1956. The first armed opposition group in Manipur, the United National Liberation Front (UNLF), was founded in 1964, which declared that it wanted to gain more rights or outright independence from India. After several rounds of negotiations, Manipur became a full state in 1972 along with several other sister states of the Northeast. Post statehood, more groups continued to form in Manipur, each with different goals, and deriving support from diverse ethnic groups in Manipur. For example, in 1977 the People's Revolutionary Party of Kangleipak (PREPAK) was formed, the People's Liberation Army (PLA) was formed in 1978. In 1980, the Kangleipak Communist Party (KCP) was formed. These groups began a spree of bank robberies and attacks on police officers and government buildings. The state government appealed to the central government in New Delhi for support in combating this violence. In 1980, the central government brought the entire state of Manipur under the Armed Forces (Special Powers) Act (AFSPA) because its state government claimed that the use of the Armed Forces in aid of the state and local police is necessary to prevent violent deaths and to maintain law and order.

The violence in Manipur includes significant inter-ethnic tribal rivalry. There is violence between the Meiteis, Nagas, Kukis and other tribal groups. They have formed splinter groups who disagree with each other. Other than UNLF, PLA and PREPAK mentioned above, other Manipuri insurgent groups include Revolutionary Peoples Front (RPF), Manipur Liberation Front Army (MLFA), Kanglei Yawol Khnna Lup (KYKL), Revolutionary Joint Committee (RJC), Peoples United Liberation Front (PULF), Kuki National Front (KNF), Kuki National Army (KNA), Kuki Defence Force (KDF), Kuki Democratic Movement (KDM), Kuki National Organisation (KNO), Kuki Security Force (KSF), Chin Kuki Revolutionary Front (CKRF), Kom Rem Peoples Convention (KRPC), Zomi Revolutionary Volunteers (ZRV), Zomi Revolutionary Army (ZRA), Zomi Reunification Organisation (ZRO), and Hmar Peoples Convention (HPC).

According to SATP (the South Asia Terrorism Portal), there has been a large decline in fatalities in Manipur in recent decades. Since 2010, about 25 civilians have died in militant-related violence (about 1 per 100,000 people), dropping further to 21 civilian deaths in 2013 (or 0.8 per 100,000 people). Most of these deaths have been from inter-factional violence. Elections have been held regularly over recent decades. The last state assembly elections were held in 2012, with 79.2% voter turnout and the incumbent re-elected to power.

=== Mizoram ===
In 1947, Mizoram was part of Assam, and its districts were controlled by hereditary tribal chiefs. The educated elites among the Mizos campaigned against the tribal chiefdom under the banner of Mizo Union. As a result of their campaign, the hereditary rights of the 259 chiefs were abolished under the Assam-Lushai District (Acquisition of Chief's Rights) Act, 1954. Village courts, which were disbanded by the colonial authorities during their re-structuring of Assam, were re-implemented in Mizo region. All of these regions were frustrated by these arrangements and centralized Assam governance. The Mizos were particularly dissatisfied with the government's inadequate response to the 1959–60 mautam famine. The Mizo National Famine Front, a body formed for famine relief in 1959, later developed into a new political organisation, the Mizo National Front (MNF) in 1961. A period of protests and armed insurgency followed in the 1960s, with MNF seeking independence from India.

In 1971, the government agreed to convert the Mizo Hills into a Union Territory, which came into being as Mizoram in 1972. Following the Mizoram Peace Accord (1986) between the Government and the MNF, Mizoram was declared a full-fledged state of India in 1987. Mizoram got two seats in the Parliament, one each in the Lok Sabha and in the Rajya Sabha. Per the accord, insurgents surrendered their arms. The first election of Mizoram Legislative Assembly was held on 16 February 1987. Elections have been held at 5 year intervals since then. The most recent Mizoram elections were held for 40 seats of the legislative assembly on 25 November 2013. The voter turnout was 81%. The Indian National Congress led by Lal Thanhawla was re-elected to power. The region has been peaceful in recent decades. Between 2006 and 2013, between 0 and 2 civilians died each year from any protest-related violence (or less than 0.2 people per 100,000).

=== Nagaland ===
After the independence of India in 1947, the area remained a part of the province of Assam. Nationalist activities arose amongst a section of the Nagas. Phizo-led Naga National Council and demanded a political union of their ancestral and native groups. The movement led to a series of violent incidents, that damaged government and civil infrastructure, attacked government officials and civilians. The Union government sent the Indian Army in 1955, to restore order. In 1957, an agreement was reached between Naga leaders and the Indian government, creating a single separate region of the Naga Hills. The Tuensang frontier was united with this single political region, Naga Hills Tuensang Area (NHTA), and it became a Union territory directly administered by the Central government with a large degree of autonomy. This was not satisfactory to the tribes, however, and agitation with violence increased across the state – including attacks on army and government institutions, and banks, as well as non-payment of taxes. In July 1960, following a discussion between the then Prime Minister Nehru and the leaders of the Naga People Convention (NPC), a 16-point agreement was arrived at whereby the Government of India recognised the formation of Nagaland as a full-fledged state within the Union of India.

Nagaland became the 16th state of the Indian Union on 1 December 1963. After elections in January 1964, the first democratically elected Nagaland Legislative Assembly was constituted on 11 February 1964. The rebel activity continued, in the form of banditry and attacks, motivated more by inter-factional tribal rivalry and personal vendetta than by political aspiration. In November 1975, the leaders of largest rebellion groups agreed to lay down their arms and accept the Indian constitution, a small group did not agree and continued their insurgent activity.

==== 1996 Dimapur car bombing ====
On Christmas Day, 25 December 1996, the NSCN-IM detonated a powerful car bomb triggered by remote control in the Ara Mile neighbourhood of Dimapur, Nagaland in an attempted assassination on Kihoto Hollohon, the then Minister of Industries & Commerce of Nagaland. Hollohon escaped as he was not in the vehicle. The blast killed his wife, daughter, granddaughter, grandson and one other on the spot.

==== 2004 Dimapur bombings ====
On 2 October 2004, two powerful bombs were set off—one at the Dimapur Railway Station and the other at the Hong Kong Market killing 30 and injuring over 100 others.

Over the 5 year of 2009 to 2013, between 0 and 11 civilians died per year in Nagaland from rebellion related activity (or less than 1 death per year per 100,000 people), and between 3 and 55 militant deaths per year in inter-factional killings (or between 0 and 3 deaths per 100,000 people). The most recent Nagaland Legislative Assembly election took place on 23 February 2013 to elect the Members of the Legislative Assembly (MLA) from each of the 60 Assembly Constituencies in the state. The voter turnout was 83% and Nagaland People's Front was elected to power with 37 seats.

=== Punjab ===
In the 1980s, an insurgent movement turned to violence, seeking a separate state called Khalistan, independent of India. They were led by Jarnail Singh Bhindranwale who was neutral on the establishment of a new state.

In 1984, Operation Blue Star was conducted by the Indian government to confront the movement. It involved an assault on the Golden Temple complex, which Sant Bhindranwale had fortified in preparation of an army assault. Indira Gandhi, India's then prime minister, ordered the military to storm the temple, who eventually had to use tanks. After a 74-hour firefight, the army successfully took control of the temple. In doing so, it damaged some portions of the Akal Takht, the Sikh Reference Library, and the Golden Temple itself. According to Indian government sources, 83 army personnel were killed and 249 were injured. Militant casualties were 493 killed and 86 injured.

During the same year, the assassination of Indira Gandhi by two Sikh bodyguards, believed to be driven by the Golden Temple affair, resulted in widespread anti-Sikh riots, especially in New Delhi. Following Operation Black Thunder in 1988, Punjab Police, first under Julio Ribeiro and then under KPS Gill, together with the Indian Army, eventually succeeded in pushing the movement underground.

In 1985, Sikh terrorists bombed an Air India flight from Canada to India, killing all 329 people on board Air India Flight 182. It was the worst mass murder in Canadian history.

The ending of Sikh militancy and the desire for a Khalistan catalysed when the then-Prime Minister of Pakistan, Benazir Bhutto, handed all intelligence material concerning Punjab militancy to the Indian government, as a goodwill gesture. The Indian government used that intelligence to arrest those who were behind attacks in India and militancy.

The ending of overt Sikh militancy in 1993 led to a period of relative calm, punctuated by militant acts (for example, the assassination of Punjab CM, Beant Singh, in 1995) attributed to half a dozen or so operating Sikh militant organisations. These organisations include Babbar Khalsa International, Khalistan Commando Force, Khalistan Liberation Force, and Khalistan Zindabad Force.

==== 1991 Punjab killings ====
The 1991 Punjab killings was a massacre of train passengers that occurred on 15 June 1991 in the Ludhiana district of the Indian State of Punjab, where Sikh Khalistani militants killed at least 80 to 126 passengers travelling in two trains. The militants stopped the two trains about a kilometre from Ludhiana station by pulling their emergency cords, triggering emergency brakes. They proceeded to open fire inside the trains at around 9:35 p.m. (IST), killing at least 80 passengers. On the second train, the Dhuri-Hisar passenger train, the militants fired indiscriminately. After the attackers fled, the train moved back to Badduwal station, where the rescue team arrived with doctors. Local villagers helped the survivors with food, water, medicine, and mental support. The attacks came less than five hours after polling closed in a national election already marred by violence and interrupted by the assassination of ex-Prime Minister Rajiv Gandhi around a month prior.

=== Rajasthan ===
==== 1996 Dausa blast ====
A bomb blast occurred on a bus near Samleti village in Dausa on 22 May 1996. The blast, which took place a day after the 1996 Lajpat Nagar blast, killed 14 people and injured 37 others. The chargesheet filed about the incident stated that the individuals responsible were associated with the Jammu and Kashmir Islamic Front, and that some of the accused had been involved in the Sawai Man Singh Stadium blast. The district and sessions court in Bandikui sentenced Abdul Hamid, one of the accused, to death, and sentenced six others to life imprisonment, while acquitting the remaining individual charged with the incident for lack of evidence against him.

==== 2008 Jaipur Bombings ====
A series of nine bomb exploded in a synchronized manner within a span of 25 minutes on the eve of 13 May 2008 in Jaipur, killing 71 people. The Indian Mujahideen claimed responsibility for the attacks.

=== Tamil Nadu ===
Militants belonging to the Liberation Tigers of Tamil Eelam (LTTE) were operating in the Tamil Nadu state up until the assassination of former Prime Minister Rajiv Gandhi. The LTTE had given many speeches in Tamil Nadu led by Velupillai Prabhakaran, S. P. Thamilselvan, and other Eelam members. The LTTE, now a banned organisation, had been receiving many donations and support from India in the past. The Tamil Nadu Liberation Army is a militant Tamil movement in India that has ties to LTTE.

==== Meenambakkam bomb blast ====
The Meenambakkam bomb blast occurred on 2 August 1984 at Meenambakkam International Airport in Chennai, Tamil Nadu. 33 persons were killed and 27 others were injured. The Tamil Eelam Army was suspected. Several members were convicted in 1998.

==== Assassination of Rajiv Gandhi ====
The assassination of Rajiv Gandhi, former Prime Minister of India, occurred as a result of a suicide bombing in Sriperumbudur, Chennai, in Tamil Nadu, India on 21 May 1991. At least 14 others, in addition to Rajiv Gandhi, were killed. It was carried out by Thenmozhi Rajaratnam (also known as Kalaivani Rajaratnam or Dhanu), a member of the Sri Lankan Tamil separatist organization Liberation Tigers of Tamil Eelam (LTTE).

==== 1993 bombing of RSS office in Chennai ====
1993 bombing of the RSS office in Chennai refers to the bombing of the head office of the Rashtriya Swayamsevak Sangh in Chennai in Tamil Nadu on 8 August 1993 by terrorists. The bombings left eleven people dead and seven others injured.

The special CBI court tried eighteen of the accused under the now-defunct Terrorist and Disruptive Activities (Prevention) Act. They had been earlier given life imprisonment by a TADA court in Chennai for their involvement in the blast on 8 August 1993 at the RSS office in Chennai. The CBI has announced a reward of Rs. 10 lakh for providing credible information about Mushtaq Ahmed, one of the main accused in the blast.

==== 1998 Coimbatore bombings ====
Tamil Nadu also faced terrorist attacks orchestrated by Muslim fundamentalists.

=== Telangana ===
==== Hyderabad ====
The 25 August 2007 Hyderabad bombings consisted of two synchronised blasts. The first bomb exploded in an amphitheatre at Lumbini Amusement Park during a laser show, killing 10 people. The second bomb exploded in Gokul Chat Bhandar, a popular restaurant, killing 32. The bombings were orchestrated by members of the Indian Mujahideen. A third unexploded bomb was later found by police.

The Mecca Masjid bombing occurred on 18 May 2007 inside the Mecca Masjid, (or "Makkah Masjid") a mosque the old city area in Hyderabad, capital of the Indian state of Telangana (then undivided Andhra Pradesh) located very close to Charminar. The blast was caused by a cellphone-triggered pipe bomb. Fourteen people were reported dead in the immediate aftermath, of whom five (official record:disputed) were killed by the police firing after the incident while trying to quell the mob.

The 2013 Hyderabad blasts occurred around 19:00 IST. The two blasts occurred in the Indian city of Hyderabad's Dilsukhnagar. The simultaneous blasts occurred near a bus stop and a cinema.

=== Tripura ===
==== Mandai massacre ====
Mandai massacre refers to the general massacre of the Bengalis of Mandai village near Agartala in the Indian state of Tripura on 8 June 1980, by tribal insurgents. According to official figures 255 Bengalis were massacred in Mandwi, while foreign presses, independent sources and eyewitnesses put the figure anywhere between 350 and 400. Many of the victims had their heads crushed and their limbs severed. The children were spiked through. Pregnant women had their stomachs slit open. Amrita Bazar Patrika described the Mandwi massacre as My Lai massacre put into shade. According to Major R. Rajamani, the commander of the Indian Army contingent that arrived on 9 June, the My Lai massacre was not even half as gruesome as in Mandai.

=== Uttar Pradesh ===
==== 2010 Varanasi blasts ====
On 7 December 2010, another blast occurred in Varanasi, that killed immediately a toddler, and set off a stampede in which 20 people, including four foreigners, were injured. The responsibility for the attack was claimed by the Islamist militant group Indian Mujahideen.

==== 2006 Varanasi blasts ====
A series of blasts occurred across the Hindu holy city of Varanasi on 7 March 2006. Fifteen people are reported to have been killed and as many as 101 others were injured. On 5 April 2006 the Indian police arrested six Islamic militants, including a cleric who helped plan bomb blasts. The cleric is believed to be a commander of a banned Bangladeshi Islamic militant group, Harkatul Jihad-al Islami, and is linked to the Inter-Services Intelligence, the Pakistani spy agency.

==== 2005 Ayodhya attacks ====
The long simmering Ayodhya crisis finally culminated in a terrorist attack on the site of the 16th century Babri Masjid. The ancient Masjid in Ayodhya was demolished on 5 July 2005. Following the two-hour gunfight between Lashkar-e-Toiba terrorists based in Pakistan and Indian police, in which six terrorists were killed, opposition parties called for a nationwide strike with the country's leaders condemning the attack, believed to have been masterminded by Dawood Ibrahim.

==== 2022 Gorakhpur attack ====
In April 2022, a man armed with a dagger forcibly tried to enter the temple premises. Chanting religious slogans, the man identified as Ahmad Murtaza Abbasi approached the constables at the gate and attacked them as a result of which two constables were injured. As the police attempted to arrest him he evaded them for a while before being captured. Abbasi is an engineering graduate from IIT Mumbai. The temple had a sizeable crowd of devotees as it was a Sunday afternoon. However no civilians were harmed in the attack. The case is being investigated by the Uttar Pradesh Anti Terrorist Squad.

=== Uttarakhand ===
==== 1991 Rudrapur bombings ====
Two bombs were exploded on 17 October 1991. The first bomb exploded when people were watching Ramlila on the public ground. After 15 minutes the second bomb went off near the hospital where injured were being taken. The bombings killed more than 40 people and injured 140 people. Later BSTK and the Khalistan National Army claimed the responsibility for the bombings.

=== West Bengal ===
==== 1993 Bowbazar bombing ====
The Bowbazaar bomb blast was an explosion which occurred in the central business district of Bowbazar, Calcutta, on the night of 16 March 1993. In total, it claimed the lives of 69 people.

In 1993, Mohammed Rashid Khan ran gambling establishments in the Bowbazaar area and had a workshop above his office where he made small bombs. After the demolition of the Babri Masjid and the riots which followed, Khan and his accomplices made plans to bomb parts of the city in order to kill Hindu residents. He began stockpiling explosives. Preparations were made secretly until, on the night of 16 March, the entire stockpile blew up accidentally. If the blast had occurred in the daytime, the death toll would have been much higher. According to some witnesses, the sound of the blast could be heard 3 miles away.

Khan and five others were sentenced to life imprisonment in 2001 by the Calcutta High Court under the Terrorist And Disruptive (Prevention) Act (TADA).

== In popular culture ==
Terrorism has also been depicted in various Indian films, prominent among them being Mani Ratnam's Roja (1992) and Dil Se.. (1998), Govind Nihlani's Drohkaal (1994), Santosh Sivan's The Terrorist (1999), Anurag Kashyap's Black Friday (2004) on the 1993 Bombay bombings, Fanaa (2006), and Sikandar (2009) on Terrorism in Kashmir. Raj Kumar Gupta's Aamir (2008) and Amal Neerad's Anwar (2010), Hotel Mumbai (2018) and Blank (2019) are other examples.

== See also ==
- Communalism (South Asia)
- Islamic terrorism
- Saffron terror
- India and state-sponsored terrorism
- Lashkar-e-Taiba
- List of films about terrorism in India
- List of organisations banned by the Government of India
- List of massacres in India
- Naxalite–Maoist insurgency
- Operation Blue Star
- Insurgency in Jammu and Kashmir
- Khalistan movement
- PRAHAAR

== Notes ==
- "Sleeping over security". (26 August – 8 Sep) Business and Economy, p 38
