= History of Mumbai during the 21st century =

The history of Mumbai during the 21st century covers the Indian city of Mumbai in the 21st century.

== Timeline ==
=== 2001 – 2009 ===
2002 bombing

- On 2 December 2002, a bomb placed under a seat of an empty BEST (Brihanmumbai Electric Supply and Transport) bus exploded near Ghatkopar station in Mumbai. Around 2 people were killed and 50 were injured. The bombing occurred on the tenth anniversary of the demolition of the Babri Masjid in Ayodhya.

2003 bombings

- On 27 January 2003, a bomb placed on a bicycle exploded near the Vile Parle station in Mumbai. The bomb killed 1 and injured 25. The blast occurred a day ahead of the visit of Atal Bihari Vajpayee, the then Prime Minister of India to the city.
- On 13 March 2003, a bomb exploded in a train compartment, as the train was entering the Mulund station in Mumbai. 10 people were killed and 70 were injured. The blast occurred a day after the tenth anniversary of the 1993 Bombay bombings.
- On 28 July 2003, a bomb placed under a seat of a BEST bus exploded in Ghatkopar. The bomb killed 4 people and injured 32.
- On 25 August 2003, two blasts in South Mumbai – one near the Gateway of India and the other at Zaveri Bazaar in Kalbadevi occurred. At least 44 people were killed and 150 injured. No group claimed responsibility for the attack, but it had been hinted that the Pakistan-based Lashkar-e-Taiba was behind the attacks.

2005 floods

- Mumbai was lashed by torrential rains on 26–27 July 2005, during which the city was brought to a complete standstill. The city received 37 inches (940 mm) of rain in 24 hours — the most any Indian city has ever received in a single day. Around 83 people were killed.

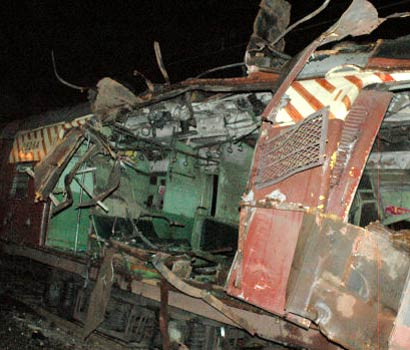
One of the bomb-damaged coaches at the Mahim station in Mumbai during the 11 July 2006 train bombings

2006 bombings

- On 11 July 2006, a series of seven bomb blasts took place over a period of 11 minutes on the Suburban Railway in Mumbai at Khar, Mahim, Matunga, Jogeshwari, Borivali, and one between Khar and Santacruz. 209 people were killed and over 700 were injured. According to Mumbai Police, the bombings were carried out by Lashkar-e-Taiba and Students' Islamic Movement of India (SIMI).

2008 attacks against migrants and bombings

- In 2008, the city experienced xenophobic attacks by the activists of the Maharashtra Navnirman Sena (MNS) under Raj Thackeray on the North Indian migrants in Mumbai. Attacks included assault on North Indian taxi drivers and damage of their vehicles.
- There were a series of ten coordinated terrorist attacks by 10 armed Pakistani men using automatic weapons and grenades which began on 26 November 2008 and ended on 29 November 2008. The attacks resulted in 164 deaths, 308 injuries, and severe damage to several important buildings.

Bandra-Worli sea link

- The Bandra–Worli Sea Link, officially known as Rajiv Gandhi Sea Link was opened to the general public on 30 June 2009. Four lanes was opened in the early stage, while all eight lanes were opened to traffic in March 2010.

=== 2010s ===
Barack Obama visit

- US President Barack Obama visited Mumbai between 6–9 November 2010. The President commemorated the 26/11 attacks on the city, visited the Mani Bhavan Museum, and hosted various business activities at the Oberoi Trident. The President later hosted a town hall meeting at St Xavier's College. During his stay in Mumbai, the President stayed at the Taj Mahal Palace & Tower, which had previously been a terrorist target in the 2008 attacks. The President proceeded to New Delhi, where he addressed the joint session of the Indian Parliament.

2011 Cricket World Cup

- On 2 April 2011, the 2011 Cricket World Cup final was held at the Wankhede Stadium, where, India emerged as a champion for the second time after the 1983 Cricket World Cup.

2011 bombings

- The city again saw a series of three coordinated bomb explosions at different locations on 13 July 2011 between 18:54 and 19:06 IST. The blasts occurred at the Opera House, Zaveri Bazaar, and Dadar, which left 26 killed, and 130 injured.

==== 2014 ====
- September – Snehal Ambekar becomes Mayor of Mumbai.
- 1 February – Mumbai Monorail inaugurated.
- 8 July – Mumbai Metro inaugurated.

=== 2020s ===
- 26 March - 2021 Mumbai hospital fire.
- 18 July - 2021 Mumbai landslide.
- The Trans Harbour bridge is the longest bridge in India and it will be opened on 12 January 2024, after the Prime Minister Narendra Modi inaugurates the bridge. It connects Bombay with Navi Mumbai.
