= Timeline of Mumbai =

The history of Mumbai can be traced back to 600 BC, with evidence of the first known settlement of the Harrappan civilization discovered in the region.

== Up to 18th century ==
- 600 BC – First known permanent settlement were the Marathi speaking Koli & Agri community.
- 200 BC - Gharapuri (Elephanta Caves) first occupied by Hinayana Buddhists who raised a large stupa to the Buddha with seven smaller stupas around it
- 300 BC – Part of Maurya Empire.
- 400 BC -The Kondivite Caves are a group of 19 rock-cut monuments built between 4th century BCE and 6th century CE
- The Kanheri Caves contain Buddhist sculptures and relief carvings, paintings and inscriptions, dating from the 1st century CE to the 10th century CE. Kanheri comes from the Sanskrit Krishnagiri, which means "black mountain". Kanheri was a university center by the time the area was under the rule of the Maurayan and Kushan empires.
- 500 - Magathane Caves
- 500 - The Gharapuri (Elephanta Caves) Hindu caves.
- 600 - The Jogeshwari Caves are some of the earliest Hindu cave temples and sculptures located in Mumbai.
- 600 - Parel Shiva
- 600 - Mandapeshwar Caves
- 800 – Part of Shilahara.The Walkeshwar Temple and the Banganga Tank were built during the reign of Chittaraja, a king of this dynasty. and Kopineshwar Mandir, a Shiva temple in Thane. The Mandapeshwar Caves is an 8th century rock-cut shrine dedicated to Hindu deity Shiva and is located in Borivali, a suburb of Mumbai.
- 1343 – Part of the Gujarat Sultanate
- 1431 – Haji Ali Dargah built.
- 1508 – Francisco de Almeida sailed into the deep natural harbour.
- 1534 – City ceded to the Portuguese.
- 1661 – Portuguese Princess Catherine of Braganza brings Bom Bahia to King Charles II of England as part of her marriage dowry.
- 1668/1669 – East India Company leased the seven islands of Mumbai from Charles II
- 1670 – First printing press imported to Mumbai by Hindu businessman from Surat Bhimjee Parikh
- 1672 – Consecration of the first Tower of Silence and first Fire temple (Hirji Vachha Agiary, now defunct)
- 1675 – Population estimated to have risen to 60,000 from 100,000 in 1661.
- 1675 – The Mumba Devi Temple built near the main landing site on the former Bori Bunder creek or inlet, against the north wall of the English Fort Saint George.
- 1709 – First attested private Parsi Adaran (in the home of Banaji Limji). Continues to be the oldest continuously-burning Zoroastrian fire in Mumbai (now in the Banaji Limji Agiary, Fort).
- 1735 – Start of shipbuilding industry (Wadia docks, Duncan docks)
- 1750 – Asia's first dry dock built by Lovji Nusserwanjee Wadia in Mumbai.
- 1777 – First newspaper published in Mumbai by Rustomji Keshaspathi.

== 19th century ==
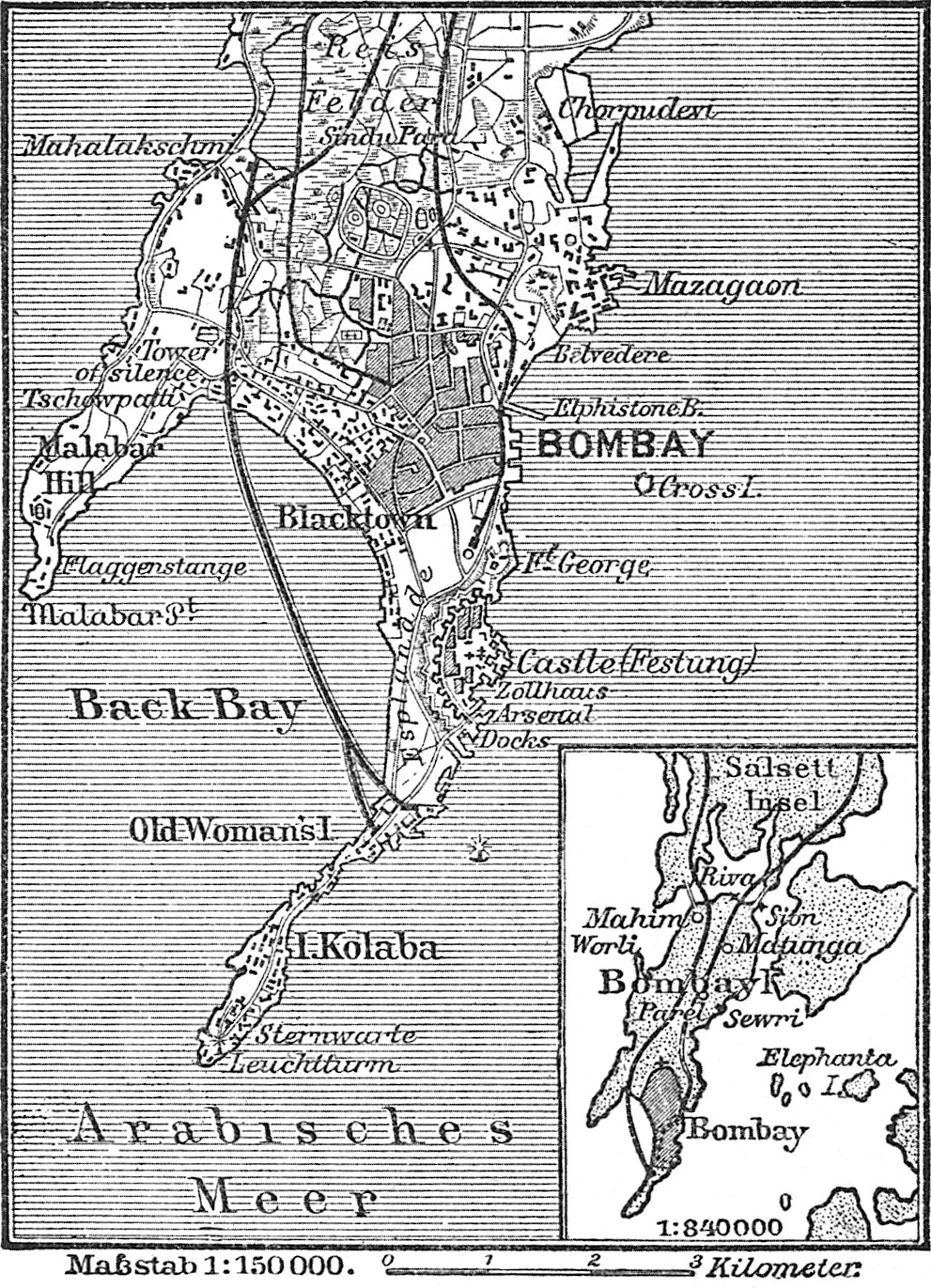
Mumbai in 1890

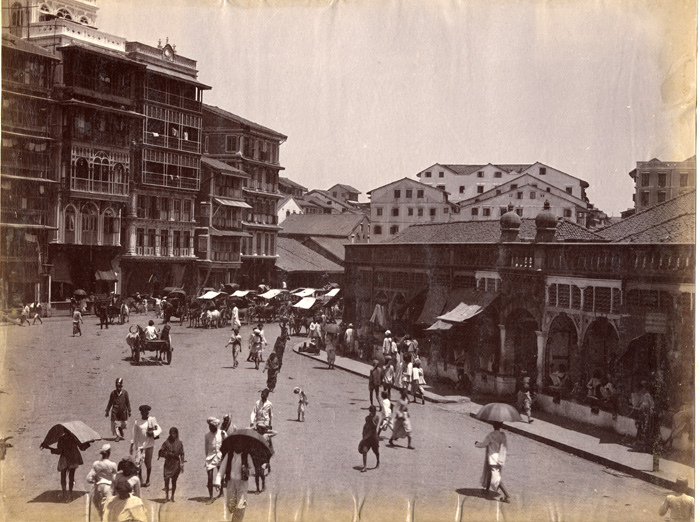
Mumbai ca. 1890

- 1801 – Siddhivinayak temple built at Prabhadevi.
- 1803 – Fire.
- 19 June 1810 – HMS Minden floated, first Royal Navy ship built outside the British Isles and from the deck of which the Star Spangled Banner would be composed
- 1822 – First vernacular language newspaper in Mumbai, Mumbai Samachar published by Fardunjee Marzban. India's oldest newspaper still being published.
- 1838 – First edition of MumbaiTimes and Journal of Commerce launched
- 1845 – Grant Medical College founded.
- 1846 – Mahim Causeway between Salsette and Mahim completed.
- 16 April 1853 – First railway line in India between Mumbai and Thane.
- 1854 – First cotton mill started.
- 1857 – University of Mumbai established.
- 1858 – The Chartered Bank of India, Australia and China opens its Bombay branch.
- 1864 – The Mumbai, Baroda, and Central India Railway (later merged with other railways to form Western Railway) is extended to Mumbai.
- 1870 – Mumbai Port Trust formed.
- 1874 – St. Peters School was set up by S.S.J.E. at Dockyard
- 1885 – Indian National Congress formed at Gowalia Tank Maidan.
- 1887 – Veermata Jijabai Technological Institute (VJTI) established. First and only institute offering degree in engineering until 1960.
- 1888 – Brihanmumbai Municipal Corporation founded.
- 1890 – Robert Harris, 4th Baron Harris arrives to take over as Governor of the Presidency of Mumbai.
- 1893 – Sectarian rioting between Hindus and Muslims.
- 1896 – Famine followed by break out of bubonic plague. Waldemar Haffkine begins plague research at Grant Medical College.
- 1897 – Haffkine announces plague vaccine, tests it on himself and on volunteers from Byculla Jail.
- 1897 – First ever gasoline motor-car in the Indian subcontinent brought to Mumbai by Mr Forster of Crompton Greaves.
- 1899 – Bombay plague epidemic

== 20th century ==
- 1900 – By this year, 45 trains of Western Railway in each direction were carrying over one million passengers annually.
- 1908 – Franciscan Missionary Brothers, a German Missionary established St Francis D'Assisi High School in Borivali, west suburbs of Bombay, India.
- 1911 – King George V and Queen Mary visit Bombay. Gateway of India is built to commemorate their arrival.
- 1912 – King George English School, Dadar, Mumbai was established, now known as Raja Shivaji Vidyasankul, Dadar, Mumbai
- 1913 – Sydenham College established. The First College of Commerce in Asia.
- 12 January 1915 – Gandhi returns to India from South Africa at Bombay.
- 1920 – Half of Bombay [ Arthur road (Chinchpokli West) to Kalachauki (cotton green station), sewri station- Bharatmata (Lalbaug) ] united in Chinchpokli to celebrate Ganesh Festival. People came from all over Bombay to Chinchpokli in Ganesh Festival.
- 22 January 1926 – King Edward Memorial Hospital inaugurated.
- 15 July 1926 – First motorised bus ran between Afghan Church and Crawford Market.
- 1928 – The first electric train runs between Churchgate and Borivali.
- 1930 – Mumbai Cricket Association established.
- 15 October 1932 – J. R. D. Tata flew from Karachi to Mumbai via Ahmedabad landing on a grass strip at Juhu paving the way for civil aviation in India.
- 1 October 1933 – UDCT established. First institute dedicated to research in Chemical Engineering in India.
- 1934 – Congress Socialist Party founded.
- 1940 – reclamation of land that will become Nariman Point begins.
- 8 August 1942 – Quit India Movement declaration passed at Gowalia Tank Maidan.
- 14 April 1944 – Mumbai Harbour Explosion kills scores of people and hurls debris up to 3 km away.
- 1947 – Progressive Artists' Group founded.
- 1958 – IIT Bombay established in Powai.
- 1960 – "Flora Fountain incident": 105 Samyukta Maharashtra Samiti demonstrators killed in altercation with the police
- 1 May 1960 – Bombay becomes the capital of newly formed Marathi-state Maharashtra.
- 31 March 1964 – Last tram made its journey from Bori Bundar to Dadar.
- 1979 – Federation of Associations of Maharasthra was founded.
- 1982 January – Great Bombay Textile Strike started, by mill workers of Mumbai, under trade union leader Dutta Samant.
- December 1992 – January 1993 – Over 2000 people killed in Hindu-Muslim communal riots following the Babri Masjid destruction.
- 1993 – Serial bomb blasts across Mumbai, masterminded by underworld don Dawood Ibrahim, kill 300 and injure hundreds more.
- 1995 – Bombay renamed Mumbai. Subsequently, University of Bombay renamed to University of Mumbai.

== 21st century ==
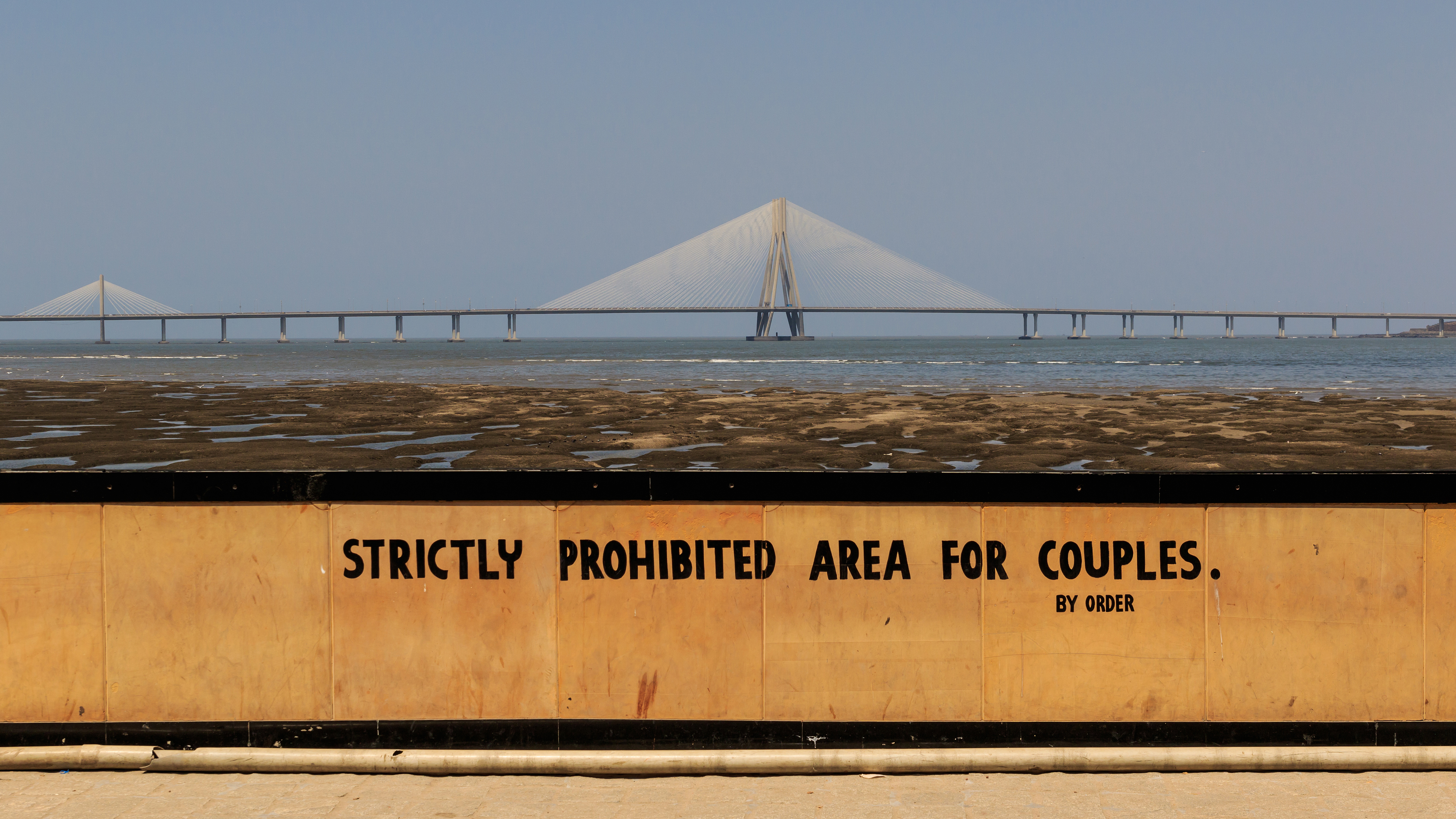
Bandra-Worli Sea Link

- 2002 – A bomb placed under a seat of an empty bus exploded near the Ghatkopar station, killing 2 people.
- 2003
  - 27 January – Bomb goes off in a bus in Ghatkopar killing 1.
  - 13 March – Bomb goes off in a train in Mulund killing 10.
  - 28 July – Bomb goes off in a bus in Ghatkopar killing 4.
  - 25 August – Two bombs go off in cars near the Gateway of India and Zaveri Bazaar, killing 54.
- 2005
  - Datta Dalvi became the Mayor of Mumbai
  - 26–27 July – Maharashtra floods, the worst in 120 years and a death toll of nearly 450.
- 2006
  - 11 July – Series of seven bombs go off in trains killing 207 people
  - Google office in business.
- 2008 – More than 10 coordinated shooting and bombing attacks kill 164 people.
- 2009 – Bandra–Worli Sea Link inaugurated.
- 2011 – A series of bombings kill 26 people
- 2014
  - September – Snehal Ambekar becomes Mayor of Mumbai.
  - 1 February – Mumbai Monorail inaugurated
  - 8 June – Mumbai Metro inaugurated
- 2021
  - 26 March – 2021 Mumbai hospital fire
  - 13 May - Cyclone Tauktae
  - 18 July – 2021 Mumbai landslide
- 2023-24
  - The coastal road was inaugurated, connecting Bandra–Worli Sea Link to Marine Lines.
  - The Trans Harbour bridge is the longest bridge in India and it will be opened on 12 January, after the prime minister, Narendra Modi, inaugurates the bridge. It connects Mumbai with Navi Mumbai.

== See also ==
- List of riots in Mumbai
- List of mayors of Mumbai
- List of years in India
