= List of terrorist incidents in 2003 =

This is a timeline of incidents in 2003 that have been labelled as "terrorism" and are not believed to have been carried out by a government or its forces (see state terrorism and state-sponsored terrorism).

== Guidelines ==
- To be included, entries must be notable (have a stand-alone article) and described by a consensus of reliable sources as "terrorism".
- List entries must comply with the guidelines outlined in the manual of style under MOS:TERRORIST.
- Casualties figures in this list are the total casualties of the incident including immediate casualties and later casualties (such as people who succumbed to their wounds long after the attacks occurred).
- Casualties listed are the victims. Perpetrator casualties are listed separately (e.g. x (+y) indicate that x victims and y perpetrators were killed/injured).
- Casualty totals may be underestimated or unavailable due to a lack of information. A figure with a plus (+) sign indicates that at least that many people have died (e.g. 10+ indicates that at least 10 people have died) – the actual toll could be considerably higher. A figure with a plus (+) sign may also indicate that over that number of people are victims.
- If casualty figures are 20 or more, they will be shown in **bold**. In addition, figures for casualties more than 50 will also be **underlined**.
- Incidents are limited to one per location per day. If multiple attacks occur in the same place on the same day, they will be merged into a single incident.
- In addition to the guidelines above, the table also includes the following categories:

0 people were killed/injured by the incident.
1–19 people were killed/injured by incident.
20–49 people were killed/injured by the incident.
50–99 people were killed/injured by the incident.
100+ people were killed/injured by the incident.

== January ==
Date	Dead	Injured	Location	Details	Perpetrator	Part of
January 5	23 (+2)	100+	Tel Aviv, Israel	Tel Aviv Central bus station massacre: Two Palestinian suicide bombers from the Islamic Jihad detonated about 2 minutes apart, the explosions ripped through a crowded neighborhood near the old Tel Aviv bus station.	Al-Aqsa Martyrs' Brigades	Second Intifada
January 27	1	28	India	2003 Mumbai bombing: An unknown person placed a bomb on a bicycle near a busy train station.	Unknown	

== February ==
Date	Dead	Injured	Location	Details	Perpetrator	Part of
February 7	36	200+	Bogota, Colombia	2003 El Nogal Club bombing: A car bomb blew up in the parking garage of an elite club.	FARC	Colombian conflict
February 25	0	3	Caracas, Venezuela	2003 Caracas attacks: Double bombing of the Spanish embassy and the Colombian consulate.	Bolivarian Forces of Liberation (suspected)	Terrorism in Venezuela

== March ==
Date	Dead	Injured	Location	Details	Perpetrator	Part of
March 5	17 (+1)	53	Haifa, Israel	Haifa bus 37 suicide bombing: A Hamas bomber detonates on an Egged bus.	Hamas	Second Intifada
March 5	6	68	Cucuta, Colombia	A car bomb kills six and injures 68 in a covered parking lot. Rebel group ELN is blamed.	ELN	Colombian conflict
March 13	10	70	Mumbai, India	March 2003 Mumbai bombing: A bomb exploded on a train as it pulled into Mulund railway station.	Unknown	
March 23	24		India	2003 Nadimarg massacre: 24 Hindus villagers are massacred by Lashkar-e-Taiba militants.	Lashkar-e-Taiba	Insurgency in Jammu and Kashmir

== April ==
Date	Dead	Injured	Location	Details	Perpetrator	Part of
April 30	3 (+1)	50	Tel Aviv, Israel	Mike's Place suicide bombing: A Muslim British citizen suicide bomber blew himself up at "Mike's Place" restaurant.	Hamas	Second Intifada

== May ==
Date	Dead	Injured	Location	Details	Perpetrator	Part of
May 12	59 (+3)	200+	Russia	2003 Znamenskoye suicide bombing: Three suicide bombers rammed a truck into a government building housing the regional headquarters of the Federal Security Service	Riyad-us Saliheen Brigade of Martyrs	Second Chechen war
May 12	39	160+	Saudi Arabia	Riyadh compound bombings: Three teams of suicide attackers opened fire on and blew themselves up at residential compounds mostly housing westerners.	Al Qaeda in the Arabian Peninsula	
May 16	33 (+12)	100+	Morocco	2003 Casablanca bombings: A number of suicide bombers target restaurants, a hotel, the Belgian consulate and Jewish centers	Salafia Jihadia	Insurgency in the Maghreb
May 18	7 (+2)	20	Israel	2003 French Hill suicide bombings: A suicide bomber disguised as a religious Jew detonated on a bus. A second bomber prematurely detonated, only killing himself.	Hamas	Second Intifada
May 19	3 (+1)	70	Afula, Israel	Afula mall bombing: A female Palestinian student suicide bomber detonated at the main entrance to the Shaarei Amakim mall.	Islamic Jihad	Second Intifada

== June ==
Date	Dead	Injured	Location	Details	Perpetrator	Part of
June 11	17 (+1)	100	Israel	Davidka Square bus bombing: A Hamas Palestinian suicide bomber, dressed as an ultra-Orthodox Jew, detonated his explosives belt on a bus in Jerusalem.	Hamas	Second Intifada
June 20	1	3	Israel	2003 Route 60 Hamas ambush: Hamas gunmen ambush an open fire on a car driving along Route, killing the driver and wounding the three passengers.	Hamas	Second Intifada

== July ==
Date	Dead	Injured	Location	Details	Perpetrator	Part of
July 4	44 (+1)	65+	Pakistan	2003 Quetta mosque bombing: Three men entered a Shia mosque frequented by Hazara people and started shooting. One of the attackers blew himself up.	Lashkar-e-Jhangvi	Balochistan conflict
July 5	15 (+2)	60+	Russia	2003 Tushino bombing: Two female suicide bombers detonated during a rock festival at Tushino Airfield.	Riyad-us Saliheen Brigade of Martyrs	Second Chechen War
July 21	1	0	Israel	Murder of Oleg Shaichat: Two Israeli Arabs kidnapped and killed IDF soldier Oleg Shaichat.	Islamists	Second Intifada
July 28	4	32	Mumbai, India	July 2003 Mumbai bombing: A bomb exploded on a B.E.S.T. bus.	Unknown	

== August ==
Date	Dead	Injured	Location	Details	Perpetrator	Part of
August 5	12 (+1)	150	Jakarta, Indonesia	2003 Marriott Hotel bombing: Suicide car bombing of the Marriott hotel.	Jemaah Islamiyah; Al-Qaeda	
August 7	17	40	Baghdad, Iraq	2003 bombing of Jordanian embassy in Baghdad: Truck bombing of the Jordanian embassy. No group claimed responsibility but Jama'at al-Tawhid wal-Jihad is strongly suspected.	Jama'at al-Tawhid wal-Jihad (suspected)	Iraq War
August 10/14	3	0	West Virginia, United States	2003 West Virginia sniper: Three people were killed in a series of sniper shootings. Eight years later, Shawn Lester was arrested and was eventually convicted and sentenced to 46 years in prison.	Shawn Lester	Terrorism in the United States
August 13	2	4	Serbia and Montenegro	2003 Goraždevac murders: Kosovo Albanian extremists opened fire on Serbian teenagers in Goraždevac killing 2 people.	Kosovo Albanian extremists	
August 19	23 (+1)	130+	Israel	Shmuel HaNavi bus bombing: Hamas suicide bomber detonated on a Jerusalem bus killing 23 people, including a pregnant woman and several children.	Hamas	Second Intifada
August 25	52	244	India	25 August 2003 Mumbai bombings: Double car bombing of the Gateway of India and jewelry market Zaveri Bazaar in Mumbai by Lashkar-e-Taiba operatives.	Lashkar-e-Taiba	
August 29	95	500+	Iraq	Imam Ali mosque bombing: Double car bombing of the Shia Imam Ali mosque.	Jama'at al-Tawhid wal-Jihad	Iraq War

== September ==
Date	Dead	Injured	Location	Details	Perpetrator	Part of
September 9	16 (+2)	65+	Israel	Tzrifin bus stop attack, Café Hillel bombing: Two Palestinian suicide bombings, the first at a crowded bus stop near Tel Aviv, the second five hours later at a popular Jerusalem nightspot. Among the victims of the bombings was the head of a Jerusalem hospital emergency room and his 20-year-old daughter who was going to get married later that evening.	Hamas	Second Intifada

== October ==
Date	Dead	Injured	Location	Details	Perpetrator	Part of
October 4	21 (+1)	51	Israel	Maxim restaurant suicide bombing: Hanadi Jaradat, a female Islamic Jihad bomber, blows herself up at a restaurant in Haifa.	Islamic Jihad; Hanadi Jaradat	Second Intifada
October 27	35 (+4)	244 (+1)	Iraq	2003 Baghdad bombings: Suicide bombings targeting a Red Cross compound and three police stations. A fourth police station was also targeted but the bomber's explosives failed to detonate and he was wounded and arrested by police.	Jama'at al-Tawhid wal-Jihad	Iraq War

== November ==
Date	Dead	Injured	Location	Details	Perpetrator	Part of
November 8	17 (+1)	122	Riyadh, Saudi Arabia	Riyadh compound bombings: A suicide car bomber targeted the Muhaya residential compound, which was occupied mainly by nationals of other Arab countries. The next day, Deputy Secretary of State Armitage said al-Qaeda was probably responsible.	Al Qaeda in the Arabian Peninsula (suspected)	
November 15/20	57	700+	Istanbul, Turkey	2003 Istanbul bombings: Two synagogues, Bet Israel and Neve Shalom were hit with truck bombs on November 15. Five days later, the headquarters of the HSBC Bank of Turkey and the British consulate were also bombed.	Jama'at al-Tawhid wal-Jihad	

== December ==
Date	Dead	Injured	Location	Details	Perpetrator	Part of
December 5	46 (+1)	170+	Russia	2003 Stavropol train bombing: A train traveling through Stavropol Krai was destroyed by a suicide bomber.	Riyad-us Saliheen Brigade of Martyrs	Second Chechen War
December 8	2	0	United States	2003 Abbeville right-of-way standoff: Two police officers were killed in 14-hour shootout and standoff with three self-proclaimed "sovereign citizens" in Abbeville, South Carolina.	Arthur, Rita and Steven Bixby	
December 9	6 (+1)	14	Russia	2003 Red Square bombing: A female suicide bomber blew herself up in the Red Square near the Kremlin.	Riyad-us Saliheen Brigade of Martyrs	Second Chechen War
December 25	4 (+1)	16	Israel	Geha Interchange bus stop bombing: A Palestinian suicide bomber, a member of the Popular Front for the Liberation of Palestine (PFLP) blew himself up at a bus stop under the Geha Bridge in Tel Aviv.	PFLP	Second Intifada
December 27	17 (+4)	200+	Iraq	2003 Karbala bombings: Suicide bombings targeting Bulgarian, Thai and Iraqi barracks.	Jama'at al-Tawhid wal-Jihad	Iraq War
December 31	10	45	Indonesia	2003 Aceh New Year's Eve bombing: A New Year's Eve concert in Aceh were bombed by suspected separatists.	Free Aceh Movement	Insurgency in Aceh

== See also ==
- List of non-state terrorist incidents
- List of Palestinian suicide attacks
- List of Palestinian rocket attacks on Israel, 2001–2006
