= 2003 Mumbai bombing =

2003 Mumbai bombing may refer to these terrorist attacks in Mumbai, India in 2003:

- January 2003 Mumbai bombing, 27 January 2003 bombing of the Vile Parle railway station
- March 2003 Mumbai bombing, 13 March 2003 train bombing at the Mulund railway station
- July 2003 Mumbai bombing, 28 July 2003 bus bombing at the Lal Bahadur Shastri Marg in Ghatkopar
- August 2003 Mumbai bombings, 25 August 2003 car bombings at the Gateway of India and Zaveri Bazaar by the Lashkar-e-Taiba

== See also ==
- Mumbai bombings (disambiguation)
