= Mumbai bombings (disambiguation) =

There have been several terrorist bombings in Mumbai (formerly Bombay) in history. Mumbai or Bombay bombings may specifically refer to:

- 1993 Bombay bombings, 12 March 1993 terrorist attacks by the D-Company
- 2002 Mumbai bus bombing, 2 December 2002 terrorist attack on a Brihanmumbai Electric Supply and Transport bus at Ghatkopar
- 2003 Mumbai bombing (disambiguation), several terrorist attacks in 2003
- 2006 Mumbai train bombings also known as 11/7 and 7/11, 11 July 2006 terrorist attacks on the Western line of the Mumbai Suburban Railway by the Lashkar-e-Taiba
- 2008 Mumbai attacks or 26/11, 26 November 2008 terrorist attacks at various locations in Mumbai by the Lashkar-e-Taiba
- 2011 Mumbai bombings or 13/7, 13 July 2011 terrorist attacks at various locations in Mumbai by the Indian Mujahideen

== See also ==
- 1944 Bombay explosion, accident involving the freighter SS Fort Stikine
