= Mumbai massacre =

Mumbai massacre may refer to:

- 1993 Bombay bombings
- August 2003 Mumbai bombings
- 2006 Mumbai train bombings
- 2008 Mumbai attacks
- 2011 Mumbai bombings
