= 2003 Davidka Square bus bombing =

2003 suicide bombing in Jerusalem

Coordinates: 31.7847°N 35.2147°E

Jerusalem bus 14A attack
- Part of the Second Intifada militancy campaign
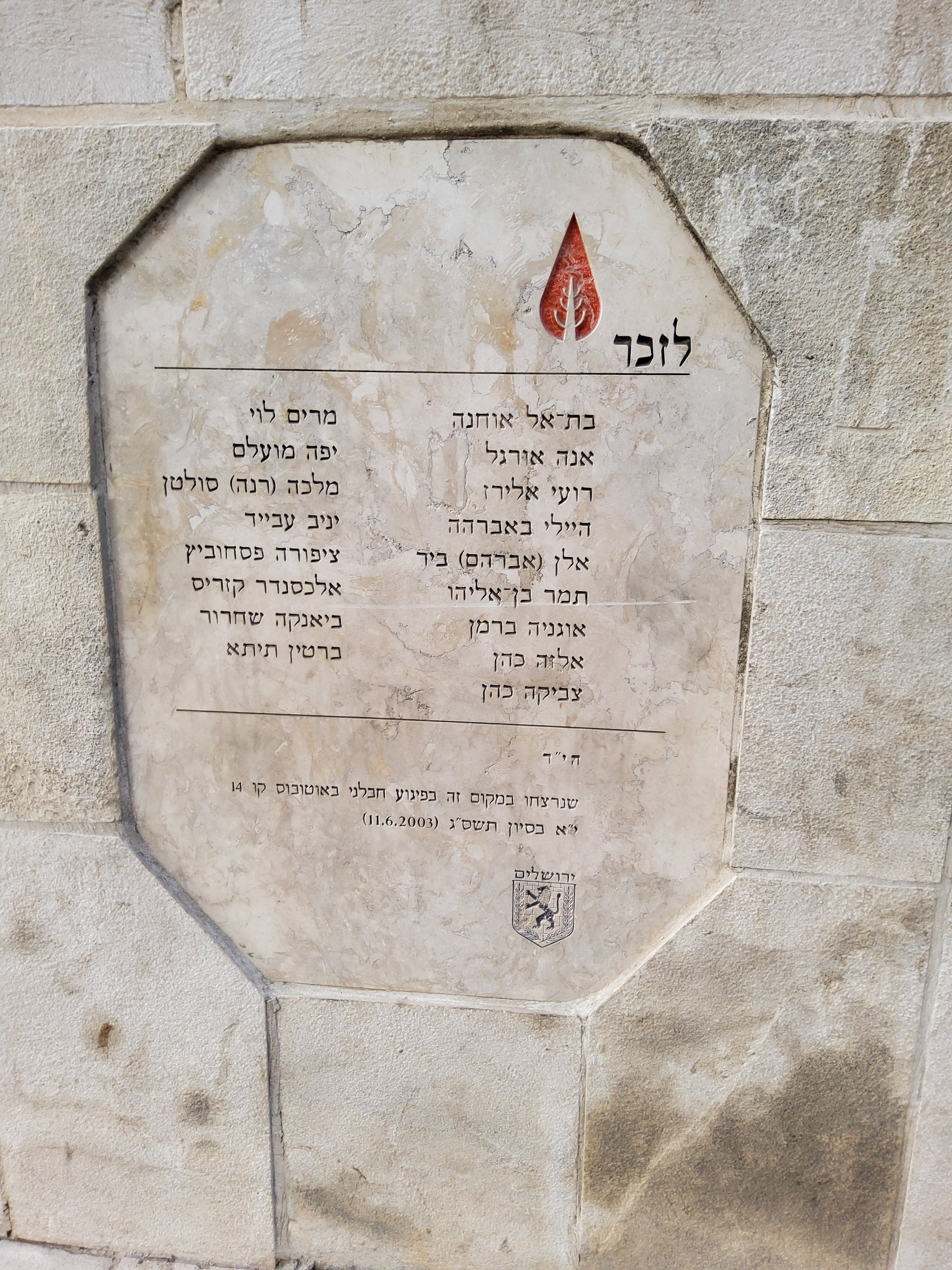
- Memorial for the attack victims

- Location of Jerusalem
- Location: Jerusalem
- Date: June 11, 2003; 23 years ago c. 17:30 pm
- Attack type: Suicide bombing
- Deaths: 17 civilians (+1 bomber)
- Injuries: Approximately 100 civilians
- Perpetrator: Hamas claimed responsibility

A Palestinian suicide bombing took place on June 11, 2003, on Egged bus line 14a at Davidka Square in the center of Jerusalem. 17 people were killed in the attack and over 100 people were injured.

Hamas claimed responsibility for the attack.

== The attack ==
At about 17:30 pm on Wednesday, June 11, 2003, a Palestinian suicide bomber dressed as an Orthodox Jew, boarded bus No. 14a at the Mahane Yehuda market bus stop on Jaffa Road. At Davidka Square, the bomber detonated his explosive device, which contained a large quantity of metal shrapnel designed to cause maximum casualties.

17 people were killed in the attack and more than 100 people were injured, including dozens of passersby. The other people who were killed included: Eugenia K. Berman, Sgt. Tamar Ben-Eliahu, 20, of Moshav Paran; Alan Beer, 47, of Jerusalem; Elsa Cohen, 70, of Jerusalem; Zvi Cohen, 39, of Jerusalem; Roi Eliraz, 22, of Mevaseret Zion; Alexander Kazaris, 77, of Jerusalem; Yaffa Mualem, 65, of Jerusalem; Yaniv Obayed, 22, of Herzliya; Bat-El Ohana, 21, of Kiryat Ata; Anna Orgal, 55, of Jerusalem; Zippora Pesahovitch, 54, of Zur Hadassah; Bianca Shahrur, 62, of Jerusalem; Malka Sultan, 67, of Jerusalem; Bertine Tita, 75, of Jerusalem and Haile Abraha Hawki of Eritrea. Miriam Levy, 74, of Jerusalem died of her wounds on June 12

== The perpetrator ==
Hamas claimed responsibility for the attack and stated that the attack was an act of vengeance for the Israeli assassination attempt on the senior Hamas leader Abdel Aziz al-Rantissi on Tuesday, June 10, 2003. Rantisi survived the assassination attempt during which Israeli helicopters fired missiles at his car.

Lawsuits were filed against Arab Bank, NatWest and Crédit Lyonnais for channeling money to Hamas.

== Israeli retaliation ==
Shortly after the bus attack, Israeli helicopters fired rockets at a moving car in Gaza that was carrying two senior Hamas members, among others. All of the car's six passengers were killed, including Hamas leader Tito Masoud.

== Official reactions ==
Involved parties Israel: A spokesman for the Israeli prime minister Ariel Sharon stated that the suicide attack indicates that the Palestinians have done nothing to crack down on militants.

Palestinian territories:

- Palestinian National Authority - Yasser Arafat condemned the attack and urged Arabs and Israelis alike to stop the violence.

International

- USA – US President George Bush condemned the attack and urged all nations to cut off financial assistance to terrorists and "isolate those who hate so much that they are willing to kill."

== See also ==
- List of terrorist incidents, 2003
- Terrorism in Israel
