= Panchratna =

Panchratnam (lit. 'five Gemstones') is a noted skyscraper and a landmark in South Mumbai, India, near its Western Railway's Charni Road Station. It was built in 1975. It has 25 floors with a unique design where the bottom six floors face the road, the seventh floor is a terrace and the remaining floors from eight to twenty-five face the Arabian Sea, giving views of Queen's Necklace, Cuffe Parade, Nariman Point, Marine Drive, Chowpatty and Walkeshwar. It was developed by Vidyasagar & Daftary

== Architecture ==
The first six floors were designed to be commercial offices while the floors above the seventh floor were designed to be residential apartments. By the early 1980s, most of the diamond market in Mumbai moved into the commercial offices, which drove up the demand for offices in nearby locations. Due to sustained high demand, the residential apartments were sold at commercial rates, where one residential apartment was converted into two or three commercial offices. In a decade, a local Mumbai newspaper estimated that the prices for each residential apartment was the most expensive residential real estate per sq. foot in all of Asia, including that of Hong Kong or Tokyo.

There are about 15 residences currently and the diamond market has moved from this building after a two decade run, to BKC. The Panchratna Housing Co-operative Society is preparing for a second re-run of encouraging residences to grow. The building has been in many news over the decades, but it is one of the first high rises to actually face the bay area of the city.

== 13 July 2011 bombing ==
On 13 July 2011, at 6:55 pm, when the 13 July 2011 Mumbai bombings took place, an improvised explosive device was detonated outside of Panchratna. Although most of the offices were empty at the time of the explosion, as many as thirty individuals on the streets nearby were injured or killed by the blasts. The bomb was one of three detonated that evening in Mumbai. Representatives of the diamond trade believed that the attacks specifically targeted their industry.
