= 1996 Dausa blast =

Bombing in Rajasthan, India

A bomb blast occurred on a bus near Samleti village in Dausa, Rajasthan on 22 May 1996.

== Explosion ==
The blast, which took place a day after the 1996 Lajpat Nagar blast, killed 14 people and injured 37 others.

== Trial and punishment ==
The chargesheet filed about the incident stated that the individuals responsible were associated with the Jammu and Kashmir Islamic Front, and that some of the accused had been involved in the Sawai Man Singh Stadium blast. The district and sessions court in Bandikui sentenced Abdul Hamid, one of the accused, to death, and sentenced six others to life imprisonment, while acquitting the remaining individual charged with the incident for lack of evidence against him.
