= Murder of Oleg Shaichat =

2003 kidnapping and attack in Israel

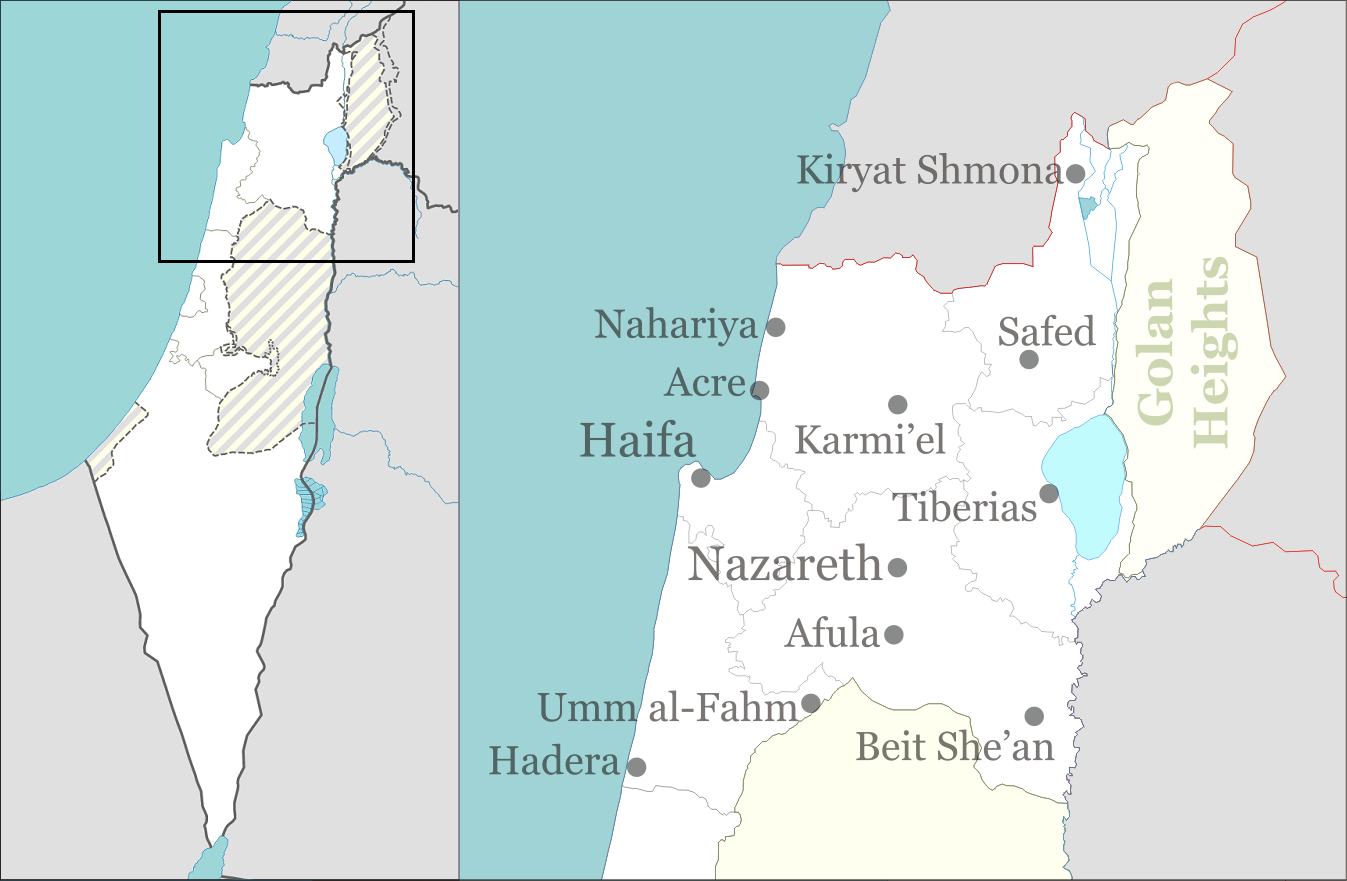
- The attack site
- Native name: רצח אולג שייחט
- Location: 32.7622°N 35.3444°E; Northern District, near Kafr Kana, Israel
- Date: July 21, 2003; 23 years ago
- Attack type: Kidnapping, Shooting attack
- Deaths: 1 Israeli soldier (Oleg Shaichat)
- Perpetrator: Terrorist cell "Free People of the Galilee"
- No. of participants: 2

The murder of Oleg Shaichat was a kidnapping and murder attack which occurred on July 28, 2003, in which two members of the Arab-Israeli terrorist cell "Free People of the Galilee" abducted and murdered Israeli soldier Corporal Oleg Shaichat.

== Attack ==
On Monday, July 21, 2003, Kafr Kana residents Mohammed Anabtawi and Mohammed Khatib, who were members of the Arab-Israeli "Free People of the Galilee" (Arabic: أحرار الجليل) terrorist cell, decided to kidnap an IDF soldier, murder him and steal his weapon. The two drove to the Beit Rimon junction in the Northern District of Israel, where they saw the soldier, Corporal Oleg Shaichat, who was hitchhiking home from his military base in Safed. Shaichat entered their vehicle and sat beside the driver while the other assailant sat behind him.

At one point, the vehicle drove onto a side road, where the two assailants fought with Shaichat, strangled him to death and stole his personal weapon. Then they put his body in the trunk and drove with to another location where they performed a dead checking on Shaichat's body.

Then the two drove to Kfar Kana, where they bought digging tools and gasoline, and soon afterwards the two buried Shaichat's body in an olive plantation and burned his belongings.

=== Victim ===
Oleg Shaichat, 20, of Nazareth Illit, had immigrated to Israel with his family from Ukraine in 1995. He completed his high school studies with honors at Yigal Allon High School, majoring in computers. He was serving at the IDF Northern Command's computer unit at the time of his death. He was survived by his parents Anisim and Olga and brother Adam.

== Aftermath ==
Shaichat's body was discovered on July 28, 2003, after an intensive week-long search, in which hundreds of volunteers participated, by the 67-year-old Saleh al-Hayeb from Beit Zarzir, who used to serve in the IDF as an officer in one of the IDF's tracking units.

An investigation was opened. At one point, three Israeli-Arab men, Yusuf Sabih, Sharif Eid, and Tariq Nujidat, were arrested for Shaichat's murder, and spent a total of eight months in prison before being cleared and released. Nujidat confessed to the crime and reenacted it, but later retracted his confession, claiming that it had been extracted under pressure and that the reconstruction was based on media reports and descriptions from fellow villagers. The Israeli government ultimately paid Sabih and Eid each NIS 500,000 in compensation and NIS 175,000 in attorney's fees, in addition to NIS 450,000 in compensation to Nujidat.

On April 18, 2004 a shooting attack was committed in the Beit Rimon junction by the Israeli-Arabs Mohammed Khatib and Alah Moussa who were members of the Arab-Israeli "Free People of the Galilee" terrorist cell. They opened fire at a Border Police patrol vehicle. The Border Guards returned fire and thwarted the attack. Khatib was killed during the shootout and Moussa was arrested. Afterwards it turned out that the weapon used in the attack was Shaichat's stolen weapon – this discovery was a breakthrough in the murder investigation. Moussa's arrest led to arrest of other members of this cell. The cell members arrested eventually confessed of killing Oleg Shaichat.

On August 12, 2004, Muhammad Anabtawi was convicted for the murder of Oleg Shaichat. On December 17, 2007, he was sentenced to 50 years in prison for the murder Oleg Shaichat, terror activities and for four attempted kidnappings.
