= 1996 Lajpat Nagar blast =

1996 explosion in Delhi

A bomb blast occurred in Lajpat Nagar market in Delhi on 21 May 1996, killing 13 civilians and injuring 39 others.

== Explosion ==
The blast was followed a day later by the 1996 Dausa blast. Six members of the militant organisation Jammu Kashmir Liberation Front were convicted for the blasts.

== Investigation ==
A police investigation discovered that the bombers were in close contact with the Pakistani Inter-Services Intelligence. In April 2012, the court awarded a death sentence to Mohammed Naushad, Mohammed Ali Bhatt and Mirza Nissar Hussain. Javed Ahmed Khan was sentenced to life imprisonment, while Farooq Ahmed Khan and Farida Dar were released by the court, adding that their imprisonment served during the trial was their punishment. In November 2012, Delhi High Court acquitted Mohammed Ali Bhatt and Mirza Nissar Hussain, and commuted the death penalty of Mirza Nissar Hussain to life imprisonment.
