= SEEPZ =

- neighbourhood
- Location in Mumbai, India
- Coordinates: 19.123°N 72.876°E
- Country: India
- State: Maharashtra
- District: Mumbai Suburban
- City: Mumbai

Government
  - Type: Municipal Corporation
  - Body: Brihanmumbai Municipal Corporation (MCGM)
- Elevation: 31 m (102 ft)

Languages
  - Official: Marathi
- Time zone: UTC+5:30 (IST)
- PIN: 400 096
- Civic agency: BMC

Santacruz Electronics Export Processing Zone (SEEPZ) is a Special Economic Zone in Mumbai, India. Situated in the Andheri East area, it is subjected to liberal economic laws as compared to the rest of India to promote rapid economic growth using tax and business incentives and attract foreign investment and technology. Seepz was created in 1973 and was seen as export processing zone. Since then many other SEZ's have been created in rest of India. SEEPZ mainly houses electronic hardware manufacturing companies, software companies, and jewelry exporters of India. More than 40 percent of India's total jewelry exports ($2,222.31 million) out of $5,210.69 million during year 2006-2007 came from units within SEEPZ.

== Profile ==
There are more than 400 units inside SEEPZ (Santacruz Electronic Export Processing Unit).

The Policing is done by the Ministry of Finance's Customs branch and the Custodian of SEEPZ is MMTC LTD. ~ Ministry of Commerce unit.

These include Fine Jewellery Mfg Ltd., Portescap India Pvt. Ltd., CGI Group Inc., Elegant Collection, Tata Consultancy Services, Syntel, Zycus, ACE Software, Inter Gold, Tara Jewels Limited, Shanker Jewels, Lumina Datamatics Limited, Indus Valley Partners to name a few.

Most buildings in the zone are built to look the same from outside; they're called Standard Design Factories. Others are made by architects to the taste of the owners.

SEEPZ is a high security entry zone. Employees of all companies need to have permanent SEEPZ gate pass to gain entry inside SEEPZ (including the Custodian's office, Bank, including Customs officials who police the SEEPZ complex).

Visitors, need special permits to enter. Due to these hassles government proposed making SEEPZ a Free Trade Zone (FTZ) in 1999. However, gate pass and visitor pass rules continue till date. Making SEEPZ a FTZ meant that it would be treated as outside the customs zone of India. This meant no excise or customs duty will ever be levied on raw materials, companies would have to sell their products/services overseas to earn back precious foreign exchange for the country that was spent in importing those goods using hard currency.

== Crimes ==
Due to its business importance and high concentration of work force SEEPZ has remained the prime target of criminals and terrorists. A high-profile case occurred in 1999 when diamonds worth ₹1,000 million (US$11 million) and gold worth ₹39 billion (US$420 million) were smuggled out and sold in local market. After the 28 July 2003 Mumbai Bus Bombing major stockpile of explosives was also found near SEEPZ. Women employees working in SEEPZ during the night shifts are entitled transport facility between home and office from their employers.

== Notable facts ==
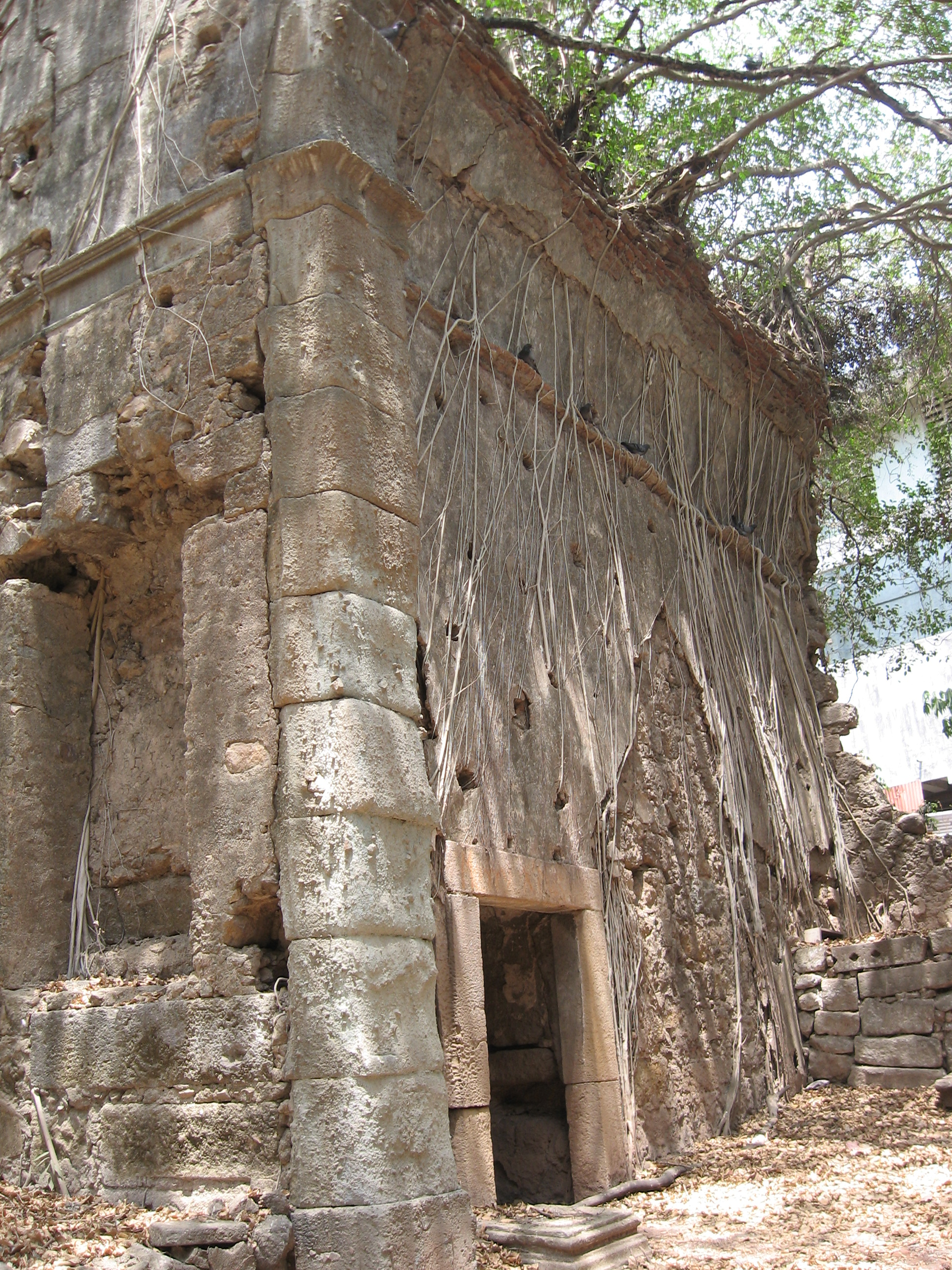
Ruins of St. John the Baptist Church in Andheri, built by the Portuguese Jesuits in 1579

Within the premises is located the ruins of an abandoned Portuguese church, St. John the Baptist Church, Mumbai built in 1579. The church also lay in ruins for years and access to it is restricted since SEEPZ was formed. After much political controversy, it was handed back to Fr Rodney Esperance of Bombay Archdiocese in 2003 in a ceremony organized by Maharashtra Chief Minister Sushil Kumar Shinde. A lake and several canteens are located inside the SEEPZ premises.

== See also ==
- Special Economic Zone
- Free trade zone
- List of SEZs in India
