= 2002 Mumbai bus bombing =

Terrorist attack in India

1st Ghatkopar Bus Bombing
- Location: 19.05°N 72.55°E; Mumbai, India
- Date: 2 December 2002; 18:45 IST (UTC+05:30)
- Attack type: Bombing
- Deaths: 2
- Injuries: 50

== Explosion ==
At 18:45 IST on Monday, 2 December 2002, a bomb placed under a seat of a BEST bus exploded near the busy Ghatkopar railway station. The bomb was placed in the rear of a bus near the station and killed two people and injured over 50. Ghatkopar being the final stop, all the passengers in the bus had just alighted and passengers for the return trip had not yet entered the bus. The people who were killed were in the busy station area.

Later, the police defused an unexploded bomb from another BEST bus in SEEPZ industrial area at Andheri.

The police arrested several young men for the blast. All were acquitted in the subsequent trial. One of the arrested Khwaja Yunus, allegedly escaped from the police custody and jumped into a gorge. Khwaja Yunus was alleged to have died in police custody of torture and that his body was disposed in the gorge by the police. In 2018, Irfan Qureshi, a wanted accused in the original blast case, was arrested after 16 years. The trial against four policemen, including Sachin Vaze, for the alleged custodial death of Khwaja Yunus remains ongoing as of 2024.

== Other bombings ==
This was the first in a series of five bombings against the city within a period of less than nine months. Other bombings included:

- January 2003 Mumbai bombing
- March 2003 Mumbai bombing
- July 2003 Mumbai bombing
- August 2003 Mumbai bombings

== See also ==
- List of terrorist incidents in 2002
