= March 2003 Mumbai bombing =

Bombing of passenger train in Mumbai

Mulund Train Bombing
- Location: Mumbai, India
- Date: 13 March 2003
- Attack type: Bombing
- Deaths: 10
- Injuries: 70

At 19:45 on 13 March 2003, a bomb exploded as a train pulled into the Mulund railway station. The bomb was placed in the first class ladies' compartment and killed 10 people and injured 70 more. Among those killed were four women in the first class compartment, two of who were police constables, and six men who were in the adjoining second class compartment.

This was the third in a series of five bombings against the city within a period of eight months. The other bombings were:

- 2002 Mumbai bus bombing
- January 2003 Mumbai bombing
- July 2003 Mumbai bombing
- August 2003 Mumbai bombings
