= January 2003 Mumbai bombing =

Bombing at railway station

Vile Parle Bombing
- Location: Mumbai, India
- Date: 27 January 2003
- Attack type: Bombing
- Deaths: 1
- Injuries: 28
- Perpetrator: Unknown

On 27 January 2003, a bomb placed on a bicycle exploded in a busy street market near the busy Vile Parle railway station in Mumbai, India. The bomb killed one person and injured 28. The blast occurred when Atal Bihari Vajpayee, the Prime Minister of India at the time, was to visit the city.

This was the second in a series of five bombings against the city within a period of eight months. Other bombings included:

- 2002 Mumbai bus bombing
- March 2003 Mumbai bombing
- July 2003 Mumbai bombing
- August 2003 Mumbai bombings
