= 2011 Mumbai bombings =

Coordinated terrorist attacks in India

- Locations of the incidents in the Opera House, Zaveri Bazaar and Dadar counties of Mumbai
- Location: 18.96°N 72.82°E; Opera House; Zaveri Bazaar; Dadar; Mumbai, Maharashtra, India
- Date: 13 July 2011; 18:54 – 19:06 IST (UTC+05:30)
- Attack type: Improvised explosive devices
- Deaths: 26
- Injuries: 130
- Perpetrator: Indian Mujahideen

The 2011 Mumbai bombings, also known as 13/7, were a series of three coordinated bomb explosions at different locations in Mumbai, India, on 13 July 2011 between 18:54 and 19:06 IST. The blasts occurred at the Opera House, at Zaveri Bazaar and at Dadar West localities, leaving 26 killed and 130 injured. Indian Mujahideen is believed to have carried out the attack with the personal involvement of its co-founder Yasin Bhatkal.

== Timeline and damage ==
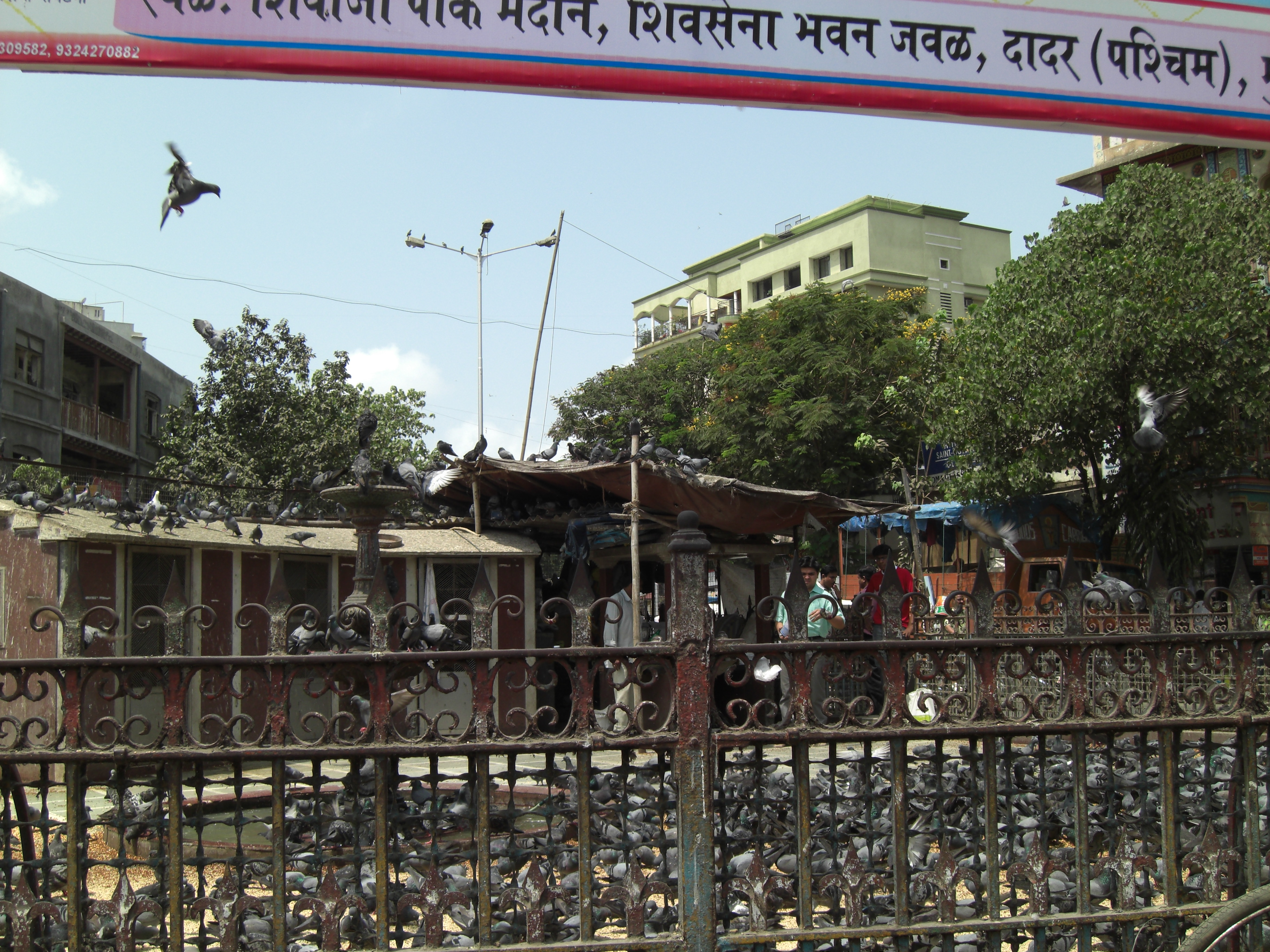
Kabooter Khana located in Dadar (West) was the third place affected.

The first device was planted on a motorcycle at Khau Gali in south Mumbai's Zaveri Bazaar and exploded at 18:54 local time. The second device, planted in a tiffin box outside Prasad Chambers and Panchratna Building, in the Opera House area on Charni Road, exploded at 18:55, the area of workplaces of 5,000–6,000 people connected with the diamond-trade industry. The third device was placed on an electric pole at the Dr Antonio Da Silva High School BEST bus stand near Kabutar Khana in Dadar area and exploded at 19:06.

Following the blasts, phone lines were jammed and communications ceased or were available intermittently for at least a few hours. Other metropolitan cities, including Delhi, Chennai, Hyderabad and Bangalore, were also put on high alert. Immediately after the blasts, the Mumbai Police sent an SMS to a few mobile phone users in Mumbai reading,

Bomb blasts reported at Zaveri Bazaar, Dadar. Please be careful. Stay indoors. Watch news channels".

Most of the injured were rushed to various hospitals in Mumbai, such as J.J. Hospital, St. George Hospital, Hurkisondas Hospital and G. T. Hospital.

Mumbai has been hit by terrorist incidents at least half a dozen times since the early 1990s, with over 600 people dying in these attacks. In an editorial, the Times of India described the city as having become a "hot hunting ground for terror." A loss of Rs. 3 billion per day was reported at the closure of the Panchratna Building, after the blasts, where the people who lost their lives were mainly from the diamond industry, and at Zaveri Bazaar, were mostly goldsmiths. Rakesh Maria said that the Anti-Terrorism Squad (India), would soon release sketches of culprits, as the footage obtained from the closed-circuit television (CCTV) cameras at Opera House site was under scrutiny.

== Casualties and compensation ==
The blasts claimed 26 lives and injured an additional 130 others.

Prime Minister Manmohan Singh and Indian National Congress leader Sonia Gandhi visited Mumbai the next day and met with those injured in blasts at Saifee Hospital. Prime Minister Manmohan Singh announced a compensation of ₹2,00,000 to the kin of each of those killed and ₹100,000 to the seriously injured. Meanwhile, the Maharashtra Government also announced ₹500,000 in compensation to the families of each of those killed and about ₹50,000 to the injured.

== Investigations ==
=== Speculations ===
There was speculation that the pattern of the blasts suggested involvement of Indian Mujahideen (IM). According to the Delhi Police, Indian Mujaheddin has been conducting blasts on the 13 or 26 of the month. (Note: The 2008 Ahmedabad bombings took place on 26 July 2008; the Delhi serial blasts occurred on 13 September 2008; Mumbai terror attacks happened on 26 November 2008, followed by the German bakery blast in Pune on 13 February 2010.) Speculation was also rife that the hard-line Taliban Mumbai underworld could be behind these blasts, in the light of the killing of journalist Jyotirmoy Dey, as well as the attempted assassination of Dawood Ibrahim's brother, Iqbal Kaskar on 3 May 2011. The day 13 July is also observed as Kashmir Martyr's day, and there could be a possibility that the attacks were carried out by Kashmiri groups. There is also a view that the attacks could have been plotted by those trying to derail the Indo-Pakistani peace process.

The slain MiD DAY crime journalist Jyotirmoy Dey had previously reported that a huge cache of 35 detonators, gelatin sticks and large quantity of ammonium nitrate explosives had been seized on 20 May 2011 from Umarkui and Sayli village in Silvassa. Ammonium nitrate, gelatin and detonators have been used in several bomb blasts in Mumbai previously. The report also mentioned that this cache had gone missing soon after local police took custody. The journalist had also speculated that the cache might be used to trigger terror attacks in the city. There were calls for further investigations into this link to the Mumbai blasts by his employer MiD DAY.

=== Timeline of investigations ===
The Home Ministry classified the bomb blasts as a terrorist act and dispatched a National Investigation Agency (NIA) team to the bomb site. The Chief Minister of Maharashtra Prithviraj Chavan said that the bombs used could have been fuel filled, much like molotov cocktails. Preliminary investigations suggested the use of multiple IED explosives in the blasts with ammonium nitrate-based explosives mixed with fuel oil. The explosives indicate some level of sophistication. It is also believed that remote detonators may have been used, with two of the three blasts being high-intensity. The Home Minister also announced that his office would be updating the people through the media every two hours.

The Maharashtra ATS was reported to have sought a list of passengers travelling from Kolkata to Mumbai and Kolkata to Kanpur from the Kolkata Police. The suspicions were a result of a Kolkata man with Indian Mujahideen link having gone missing in the previous few days. A NIA team visited Ahmedabad on 15 July 2011 to meet an Indian Mujahideen suspect who was arrested by the Crime Branch in connection with the 2008 Ahmedabad bombings. On 16 July, Maharashtra ATS Chief Rakesh Maria said that, based on forensic opinion and visit to the various sites, the possibility of a suicide bomber was being ruled out. However, a sketch of a possible suspect based on CCTV footage from one of the blast sites was being prepared. He added that in light of the sensitive nature of the investigation, the entire detail of the probe could not be revealed at that particular stage.

On 4 August, Home Minister P. Chidambaram suggested indications of involvement of a home-grown terror module in the blasts.

On 9 August, the Maharashtra ATS arrested one person it claimed had stolen a bike used in the Zaveri Bazaar explosion. The bike had been stolen from one Amit Singh a few hours before the blasts. CCTV footage showed one person with long hair riding a stolen red colour Honda Activa, entering the crowded lane, taking two left turns, placing the scooter at the spot of the explosion and walking off.

On 23 January 2012, the Mumbai Police claimed that it had solved the Mumbai Blasts case with the arrests of two suspects – Naqi Ahmed Wasi Ahmed Sheikh (22) and Nadeem Akhtar Ashfaq Sheikh (23) – hailing from Darbhanga district of Bihar. The Mumbai Police's ATS claimed that the two had stolen two scooters used in the blasts according to a scheme whose logistics were managed by Yasin Bhatkal, the mastermind of the blast. However, this televised announcement baffled the other intelligence agencies. It was later revealed that Naqi Ahmed was assisting the Delhi Police and other central intelligence agencies in tracking down two other perpetrators of the blast. Further investigations revealed that the two Pakistani bombers, named Waqqas and Tabrez, staying in Byculla used as many as 18 SIM cards and six handsets. The duo received sim cards from the co-accused Naqi Ahmed, who was arrested by the ATS in January 2012 for possessing SIM cards obtained with fake documents, following which Naqi admitted his role in the blasts and also admitted working with Indian Mujahideen's founder member Yasin Bhatkal in arranging accommodations for the bombers.

On 25 May 2012, Maharashtra ATS filed a chargesheet against Naqee Ahmed, Nadeem Shaikh, Kanwar Pathrija and Haroon Naik (all are under arrest). Additionally, the chargesheet named six others including Indian Mujahideen mastermind Yasin Bhatkal and Riyaz Bhatkal, Waqas Ibrahim Sad, Danish alias Tarbez, Dubai based Muzaffar Kolah and Tehseen Akhtar as wanted accused on the run.

On 4 February 2014, Maharashtra ATS was handed over the custody of Indian Mujahideen mastermind Yasin Bhatkal for probing the 2011 Mumbai Bombings Case.

On 16 July 2014 Mumbai ATS arrested Abdul Mateen Fakki from Goa’s Dabolim Airport, while he arrived from Dubai by flight. He is accused of financing the terrorist operation by passing money through Hawala sources to Indian Mujahideen co-founder Yasin Bhatkal.

=== Allegations of police brutality ===
The Mumbai Police detained several men for questioning. One of those detained—Faiz Usmani—died while in police custody on 17 July, sparking allegations of police brutality. Usmani was the brother of one of the accused in the 2008 Ahmedabad bombings case. It was alleged by his family members that Faiz Usmani was healthy when the police picked him up and that he was subjected to torture in police custody. The police dismissed these charges and countered that Usmani was suffering from hypertension and complained of giddiness after walking himself into a police station. He was admitted to the Lokmanya Tilak hospital, Sion, Mumbai, following which he died quickly due to blood clots in brain and a heart attack. A CID probe was ordered into Usmani's death.

== Aftermath ==
In the wake of the blasts, Boeing announced that the Boeing-787 Dreamliner, which was on its maiden visit to India, would skip the Mumbai leg of the trip. An official said that it would have been insensitive to take the plane to Mumbai at this time when such a tragedy had occurred and that the decision had also been taken in view of security concerns and so as not to put added pressure to provide extra cover for the aircraft.

Chief Minister of Maharashtra Prithviraj Chavan revealed a plan by the Maharashtra government for a future use of satellite phones and the development of a secure communication network so that the administrative functioning is not affected during such crises as a result of network problems. He also reiterated the need to expedite the procurement of police modernisation equipment and the installation of CCTV cameras at prominent places in the city. Following the Mumbai terror attacks the Directorate General of Shipping (DGS) banned the use of Thuraya & Iridium satellite phones and infrastructure. Restrictions were already in place in 2010, for similar reasons, under provisions in the Indian Telegraph Act, 1885.

== Reactions ==
=== Domestic ===
President Pratibha Patil and Vice-President Hamid Ansari expressed their shock and condemned the attacks in Mumbai. Indian Prime Minister Manmohan Singh also condemned the bombing, and called on Mumbai citizens to remain calm and show unity. Other politicians, such as Sonia Gandhi, chairperson of the Indian National Congress and Nitin Gadkari of the BJP expressed their anger and offered condolences to the families of the bombing victims. Senior BJP leader L K Advani visited Mumbai on 14 July and stated that the repeated attacks in Mumbai prove policy failure on part of the government. The Left parties (CPI and CPI (M)) strongly condemned the Mumbai serial blasts and rued the government's inability to track down the perpetrators of recent terror strikes. Maharashtra Chief Minister Prithviraj Chavan said that this was an attack on the heart of India. Home Minister P. Chidambaram left Delhi for Mumbai on the same night and visited the three blast sites, met the injured in the hospitals, and interacted with the family members of the dead.

Local politician, Manohar Joshi of the Shiv Sena, urged the government to "take immediate steps and find out who are people behind the blasts."

INC general secretary Rahul Gandhi remarked that it was impossible to stop every terror attack. He said that 99 per cent of terror attacks had been prevented in the country thanks to various measures, such as improved intelligence collection efforts. He added that "We work towards defeating it, but it is very difficult to stop all the attacks. Even the United States, they are being attacked in Afghanistan.". His comments drew flak from some quarters of the Indian political spectrum, who criticised him for equating the Mumbai attacks with those in Afghanistan and called it an insult to those killed in the blasts.

Chairman of the moderate Hurriyat faction Mirwaiz Umar Farooq condemned the Mumbai blasts saying such incidents are orchestrated to derail the dialogue process between India and Pakistan and that those involved in the killing of innocent people are enemies of humanity'. In a statement, he said "We are saddened by the huge loss of life in the Mumbai blasts and condemn it. Spilling the blood of innocents, be it in Mumbai, Palestine, Karachi or Kashmir, is a shameful and inhuman act."

=== International ===
==== Organisations ====
- A statement issued by UN Secretary-General Ban Ki-moon's office read: "The Secretary-General condemns the attacks that have killed and injured many in Mumbai," said a statement from his office. "No cause or grievance can justify indiscriminate violence against civilians. The Secretary-General expresses his solidarity with the Government and people of India, and extends his sincere condolences to the families of the victims," it added.

A statement read by Peter Wittig, Germany's ambassador to the UN and current United Nations Security Council President declared that "the members of the Security Council reaffirmed that terrorism in all its forms and manifestations constitutes one of the most serious threats to international peace and security, and that any acts of terrorism are criminal and unjustifiable, regardless of their motivation." In a deviation from the language used by the Security Council in its condemnations of other such attacks, this press statement did not contain the Security Council's usual admonition to member states that they must ensure that measures taken to combat such incidents, comply with all their obligations under international law, in particular international human rights, refugee and humanitarian law, prompting some observers to comment that this was a result of India's growing clout in the premier body.

- European Union foreign policy chief Catherine Ashton's office released a statement that read: "(Ashton) was horrified to hear that Mumbai has again been the target of a series of deadly bomb attacks. She condemns these heinous acts and expresses her condolences to the families and friends of the victims. It is essential that the perpetrators these evil attacks are brought to justice," stated a release issued by her office.
- Secretary General of NATO Anders Fogh Rasmussen expressed deepest sympathies to the victims of the terrorist attacks in heavily populated areas of Mumbai. He condemned in the strongest possible terms the indiscriminate violence and the senseless loss of innocent lives.

== See also ==
- 25 August 2003 Mumbai bombings
- 2008 Mumbai attacks
- 2011 Agra bombing
- 2011 Delhi bombing
