= July 2003 Mumbai bombing =

Coordinates: 19.095213°N 72.914178°E

Ghatkopar Bus Bombing
- Location: Mumbai, India
- Date: 28 July 2003
- Attack type: Bus Bombing
- Deaths: 4
- Injuries: 32

At 21:15 on 28 July 2003 a bomb placed under a seat of a BEST bus exploded on the busy Lal Bahadur Shastri Marg in Ghatkopar. The bomb was placed in the rear of the bus, killing four people and injuring 32. A man who was riding a motorcycle behind the bus and a woman who was in a rickshaw travelling near the bus were among those killed. An eyewitness said that the woman was thrown at least 10 feet away from the rickshaw and died on the spot. This was the fourth in a series of five bombings against the city within a period of eight months.

Other bombings include:

- 2002 Mumbai bus bombing
- January 2003 Mumbai bombing
- March 2003 Mumbai bombing
- August 2003 Mumbai bombings
