= August 2003 Mumbai bombings =

Gateway of India and Zaveri Bazaar twin blasts
- Location: Mumbai, India
- Date: 25 August 2003
- Attack type: Car bombing
- Deaths: 52
- Injuries: 300
- Perpetrators: Mohammed Haneef Sayed, his wife Fahmeeda Sayed and Ashrat Ansari – operatives of Lashkar-e-Taiba (LeT)

The 25 August 2003 Mumbai bombings were twin car bombings in Mumbai that killed 54, and injured 244 people. One of the bomb explosions took place at the Gateway of India, which is a major tourist attraction. The other bomb went off in a jewellery market Zaveri Bazaar near the Mumba Devi Temple in central Mumbai. Both the bombs were planted in parked Taxi and exploded during the lunch hour. No group initially claimed responsibility for the attack, but Pakistan-based Lashkar-e-Taiba was blamed for it.

On 31 August 2003, three suspects – Ashrat Ansari, Haneef Sayyed (died 2019) and Sayyed's wife, Fahmeeda, were arrested. All three were convicted and sentenced to death in August, 2009 by a special POTA court in Mumbai. Later, the death sentence was upheld by Bombay High Court in February 2012. Haneef was recruited in Dubai, UAE by Pakistani nationals to avenge anti-Muslim riots in India. His wife assisted and chose targets, while Ansari planted the bomb at Zaveri Bazaar.

== Chronology of events ==
As per rediff.com

- 25 August 2003: Twin blasts occur at Zaveri Bazaar and Gateway of India in South Mumbai. Around 52 people are killed and over 100 injured.
- 31 August 2003: Mumbai Police arrests three accused Ashrat Ansari, 32, Hanif Sayed, 46, and his wife Fehmida Sayed, 43.
- 1 October 2003: Two more accused, Mohammed Ansari Ladoowala and Mohammed Hasan Batterywala are arrested.
- 5 February 2004: Police file charges against six accused in the case as per Prevention of Terrorism Act, 2002. Police allege the six to have been involved in placing an unexploded bomb in a bus at SEEPZ in Andheri on 2 December 2002 and placing bomb in bus at Ghatkopar on 8 July 2003 in which two persons were killed.
- 20 June 2004: Charges are brought against five accused. One is let go.
- 2 September 2004: Trial begins.
- December 2008—Ladoowala and Batterywala are discharged from the case by POTA court. Later Supreme Court of India also upholds POTA review committee report stating no charges hold ground against them.
- 27 July 2009: Three accused Ashrat Ansari, Hanif Sayed and his wife Fehmida Sayed are convicted by special POTA court under sections of IPC, POTA, Explosives Act, Explosive Substances Act.
- 6 August 2009: Three convicts sentenced to death by special POTA court. Other two acquitted. In the proceedings of the case, accused said that they had acted emotionally in response to the Gujarat communal riots, had pleaded to be spared the death sentence. However, public prosecutor showed the court that they had, in fact, acted in cold blood and planned their attacks well. When a gelatin blast at Ghatkopar in 28 July 2003, claimed just two lives, they decided to use RDX to take a heavier toll in the twin blasts a month later, he said. They enjoyed the act of killing and deserve no mercy. The Pota court rejected all pleas of leniency and held that the brazen terror attack fell under the rarest of rare category of cases where the death sentence was well deserved.
- 12 February 2012: Bombay High Court upheld the death sentence awarded by special POTA court to Mohammed Haneef Sayed, his wife Fahmeeda and aide Ashrat Ansari. However, Bombay High Court quashed the order of the POTA court of acquitting two other accused, Mohammed Ansari Ladoowala and Mohammed Hasan Batterywala. They will now have to face trial under IPC charges that had been levelled against them and not under POTA.
