= 2007 in India =

- Centuries: 19th; 20th; 21st
- Decades: 1980s; 1990s; 2000s; 2010s; 2020s
- See also: List of years in India; Timeline of Indian history

Events in the year 2007 in the Republic of India.

== Incumbents ==
- President of India: A. P. J. Abdul Kalam to 25 July Pratibha Patil
- Vice President of India –
  - Bhairon Singh Shekhawat(till 21 July)
  - Mohammad Hamid Ansari(from 11 August)
- Prime Minister of India: Dr. Manmohan Singh
- Chief Justice of India – Yogesh Kumar Sabharwal until 13 January, K. G. Balakrishnan

=== Governors ===
- Andhra Pradesh – Rameshwar Thakur (until 22 August), N. D. Tiwari (starting 22 August)
- Arunachal Pradesh – ** until 23 January: Shilendra Kumar Singh
  - 23 January-6 April: M. M. Jacob
  - 6 April-14 April: K. Sankaranarayanan
  - 15 April-3 September: Shilendra Kumar Singh
  - starting 3 September: K. Sankaranarayanan
- Assam – Ajai Singh
- Bihar – Buta Singh
- Chhattisgarh – Krishna Mohan Seth (until 25 January), E. S. L. Narasimhan (starting 25 January)
- Goa – S. C. Jamir
- Gujarat – Nawal Kishore Sharma
- Haryana – Akhlaqur Rahman Kidwai
- Himachal Pradesh – Vishnu Sadashiv Kokje
- Jammu and Kashmir – Syed Sibtey Razi
- Jharkhand – S. K. Sinha
- Karnataka – T. N. Chaturvedi (until 20 August), Rameshwar Thakur (starting 20 August)
- Kerala – R. L. Bhatia
- Madhya Pradesh – Balram Jakhar
- Maharashtra – S.M. Krishna
- Manipur – Shivinder Singh Sidhu
- Meghalaya –
  - until 11 April: M.M. Jacob
  - 11 April-28 October: Banwari Lal Joshi
  - starting 28 October: Shivinder Singh Sidhu
- Mizoram – M. M. Lakhera
- Nagaland – Shyamal Datta (until 2 February), K. Sankaranarayanan (starting 2 February)
- Odisha – Rameshwar Thakur
- Punjab – Sunith Francis Rodrigues
- Rajasthan –
  - until 21 June: Pratibha Patil
  - 21 June-6 September: Akhlaqur Rahman Kidwai
  - starting 6 September: S. K. Singh
- Sikkim – V. Rama Rao (until 25 October), Sudarshan Agarwal (starting 25 October)
- Tamil Nadu – Surjit Singh Barnala
- Tripura – Dinesh Nandan Sahay
- Uttar Pradesh – T. V. Rajeswar
- Uttarakhand – Sudarshan Agarwal (until 28 October), Banwari Lal Joshi (starting 28 October)
- West Bengal – Gopalkrishna Gandhi

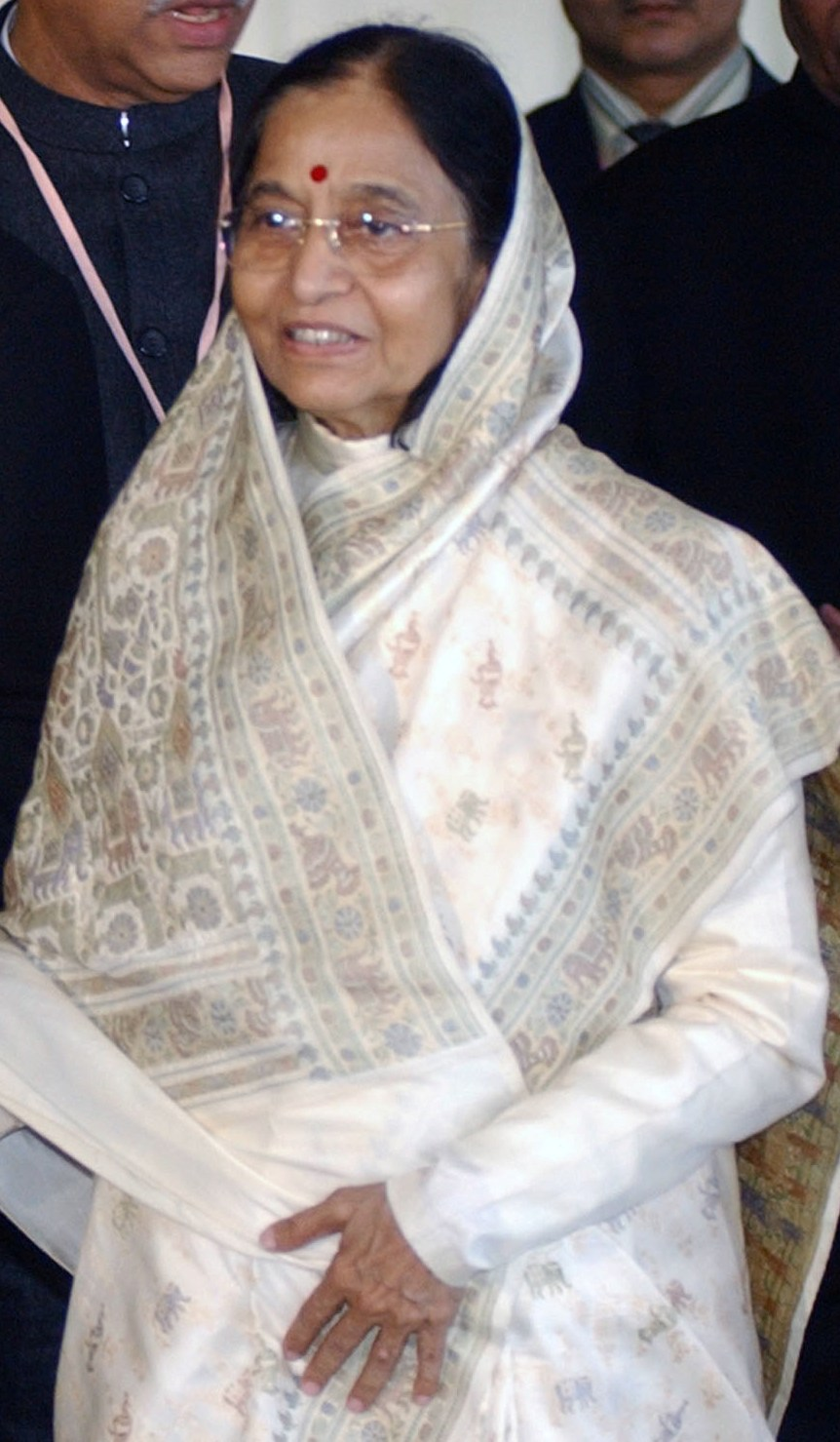
Prathiba Patil is elected as the first female President of India

== Events ==
=== January ===
- January–November – Nandigram violence – Clashes between opposition parties, the governing Communist Party of India (Marxist) and police in Nandigram, West Bengal. On 14 March, 14 villagers were killed in police firing.
- 10 January – India launches four satellites at a time with their PSLV -C7 rocket, including the SRE-1 test article, which will return to Earth in a test for a future Indian human spaceflight program.
- 17 January – Protests occur in India and the United Kingdom against the British series of Celebrity Big Brother after Jade Goody, Danielle Lloyd and Jo O'Meara were alleged to have been racially abusive towards Bollywood star Shilpa Shetty.
- 22 January – Indian spacecraft SRE 1 successfully completes a twelve-day orbital test flight, making India one of the few nations to return a craft from orbit.
- 24 January – India and Russia agree to jointly develop fifth-generation stealth fighter jets.

=== February ===
- 9–18 February– The 33rd National Games of India are held in Guwahati, Assam, featuring 10,945 athletes, 32 sports, and participants from 30 states and union territories.
- 18 February – 2007 Samjhauta Express bombings: Hindutva militants from the Abhinav Bharat organization set off multiple bombs on the Delhi-Lahore Samjhauta Express near Panipat, killing about 68 people and injuring around 50; the attack triggers investigations, and later court acquittals due to lack of evidence.
- 20 February – A river boat carrying children on a school trip on the Periyar River in southern India capsizes, killing at least 18 students and four teachers.

=== March ===
- 4 March – Sunil Kumar Mahato, an Indian member of parliament from the Jharkhand Mukti Morcha, is killed by suspected Maoist rebels while he was attending a local football match in Jharkhand organised to mark the Hindu festival of Holi.
- 15 March – Naxalite rebels attack a police outpost in the Bijapur district of Chhattisgarh, India, killing at least 49 officers and looting their weapons.
- 17–23 March – 2007 Cricket World Cup: India is eliminated in the group stage, after defeating Bermuda and losing to Bangladesh and Sri Lanka.
- 30 March – The Reserve Bank of India raises the repurchase agreement by 25 basis points to 7.75%, and increases the reserve requirement by 0.5 percentage points.

=== April ===
- 16 April – At least 11 people die in southern India as a passenger train runs into a minibus carrying local officials near the village of Thirumatpur in Tamil Nadu.

=== May ===
- 18 May – 18 May 2007 Hyderabad Bombing: 9 people are killed in a bomb blast at the Mecca Masjid mosque in the Indian city of Hyderabad, India.

=== July ===
- 19 July – Pratibha Patil is elected as the first female President of India.

=== August ===
- 25 August – Forty-four people are dead after two bombs explode in Hyderabad.
- August – India and the United States release the text of 123 agreement. This has been very controversial in the Indian political environment with both Left and NDA opposing the UPA over the issue.

=== September ===
- 16 September – 2007 West Bengal food riots: Food riots erupt in Radhamohanpur village over shortages of subsidised food grains and corruption in the public distribution system; the unrest spreads to other districts, resulting in three deaths.
- 24 September – India won the ICC t20 world cup 2007 by beating their rivals Pakistan in the final

=== November ===
- 11 November – Miss India-Earth Pooja Chitgopekar won in Miss Earth 2007 beauty pageant as Miss Earth-Air (1st-runner up) held in Manila, Philippines.
- 21 November – Calcutta – Protests over Bangladeshi feminist writer Taslima Nasreen turn into deadly riots; troops are deployed.

=== December ===
- 22 December – Narendra Modi led government in Gujarat completes its term.
- 29 December - Sunil Joshi, a Rashtriya Swayamsevak Sangh functionary shot dead in Madhya Pradesh allegedly by proponents of Saffron terror.

== Deaths ==
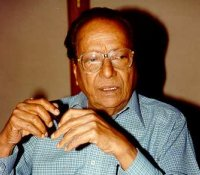
Kamleshwar

- 27 January – Kamleshwar, writer, screenwriter, critic and essayist (b. 1932).
- 28 January – O. P. Nayyar, film music director and composer (b. 1926).
- 2 February – Vijay Arora, actor (b. 1946).
- 4 March – Sunil Kumar Mahato, politician, assassinated (b. 1966).
- 1 April – Laurie Baker, English-born architect (b. 1917)
- 5 April – Leela Majumdar, writer (b. 1908).
- 5 April – Poornachandra Tejaswi, writer and novelist (b. 1938).
- 13 April – Dhulipala Seetharama Sastry, actor (b. 1921).
- 27 May – Ibrahim Saeed, journalist, editor and scholar (b. 1945).
- 13 June – Ramchandra Gandhi, philosopher, grandson of Mahatma Gandhi (b. 1937).
- 2 July – Dilip Sardesai, cricketer (b. 1940).
- 8 July – Chandra Shekhar, politician, 11th Prime Minister of India (b. 1927).
- 21 August – Qurratulain Hyder, novelist and short story writer, academic and journalist (b. 1926).
- 10 October – S. R. Bommai, politician and Chief Minister of Karnataka (b. 1924).
- 11 October – Sri Chinmoy, spiritual teacher and philosopher (b. 1931).
- 27 October – Satyen Kappu, actor (b. 1931).
- 21 December – Teji Bachchan, wife of poet Harivansh Rai Bachchan and mother of actor, Amitabh Bachchan.
- 25 December – G. P. Sippy, film producer and director (b. 1914).

== See also ==
- Bollywood films of 2007
