= Ajmer Dargah bombing =

2007 terror attack on shrine in Ajmer, Rajasthan, India

Ajmer Sharif Dargah bombing
- Ajmer Sharif (Rajasthan)
- Location: Ajmer, Rajasthan, India; 26°27′25″N 74°37′40″E
- Date: 11 October 2007; 18:12 IST (UTC+5.30)
- Target: Dargah of Moinuddin Chishti
- Attack type: Bomb in a Tiffin carrier
- Weapon: Improvised explosive device
- Deaths: 3
- Injuries: 17
- Motive: Islamophobia
- Verdict: Life imprisonment and fine
- Convictions: Devendra Gupta, Bhavesh Bhai Patel, and Sunil Joshi

The Ajmer Dargah bombing (also called the Ajmer Sharif blast) occurred on 11 October 2007, in the courtyard of Sufi maulana Moinuddin Chishti in Ajmer, Rajasthan, India, after the Iftar period had started. On 22 March 2017 a Special NIA Court convicted three pracharaks Devendra Gupta, Bhavesh Bhai Patel and Sunil Joshi. In 2017, Joshi (posthumously) and Gupta were found guilty on charges of conspiracy and Patel was found guilty of planting the explosive on the blast site. Gupta and Patel were awarded life imprisonment. Joshi was found shot dead in Godhra in mysterious circumstances soon after the blast in Dewas, Madhya Pradesh.

== Attack ==
At 6.12 pm on 11 October 2007, an explosion occurred near a courtyard outside the Dargah of Khawaja Moinuddin Chishti in Ajmer. Evening prayers had just concluded before the end of the fasting month of Ramadan and a crowd had gathered outside the shrine to end their fast. The bomb had been concealed in a tiffin carrier, which workers typically used to store their lunch. The blast killed 3 people and injured 17 others. Remnants of a mobile phone were retrieved from the site. Lalit Maheswari of the Ajmer police stated, "We have recovered some mobile instruments, so we think some sophisticated device was used ...".

=== Investigations ===
The Ministry of Home Affairs (India) initially stated that the blast could have been the responsibility of Pakistan-based Lashkar-e-Taiba. The media had also initially characterized the attack as part of a conflict between ultra-conservative Islamic extremists against the Sufi-derived Islamic traditions popular in India.

On 22 October 2010, five suspects, who had been arrested by the Anti-Terrorism Squad of India, were charged with conspiracy in connection to the bombing. Four of the five suspects were connected to the Hindu nationalist organization, Rashtriya Swayamsevak Sangh.

NIA filed another charge sheet against Swami Aseemanand, whose confession helped the agency open Hyderabad's Mecca Masjid blast and Malegaon 2006 blast cases, along with Sandeep Dangae, Bhawesh Patel, Mehul, Suresh Bhai, Ramchandra Kalsangra, Sunil Joshi and Bharat Bhai. According to the charge sheet filed, Swami Aseemanand conceived the plan to avenge Islamic attacks on Hindu temples.

In 2011, the Central Bureau of Investigation started investigating the Hindutva organisation, Abhinav Bharat on the basis of Aseemanands confession. Swami Aseemanand's named the co-founder of the far right Hindu organisation, Abhinav Bharat, Prasad Shrikant Purohit and senior Rashtriya Swayamsevak Sangh leader Indresh Kumar among others as co-conspirators. The Swami in his statement also claimed that Sunil Joshi was the operational man and carried out the blast in Ajmer with the help of two Muslim boys from the Inter-Services Intelligence of Pakistan, who were given to him by Indresh Kumar. Another individual accused in the attack was Bharat Bhai alias Bharat Rateshwar, who is also accused of financing several other Hindutva terrorist attacks such the Mecca Masjid blast and the 2007 Samjhauta Express bombings. He was accused of funding and planning terrorist attacks against Muslims to avenge the attacks on Hindus in India.

== Conviction ==
On 8 March 2017, a special National Investigation Agency (NIA) court in Jaipur found guilty three ex-RSS pracharaks, Bhavesh Patel, Devendra Gupta, and Sunil Joshi (who was murdered in 2007). Both Patel and Gupta were awarded life imprisonments and imposed a fine of Rs 5,000 and Rs 10,000 respectively. Swami Aseemanand and 6 other accused were acquitted, giving them the "benefit of doubt". At the same time, the court questioned the NIA on its clean chit to two of the other accused, Ramesh Gohil and Amit, as well as "suspicious persons" such as the senior RSS leader Indresh Kumar and Pragya Singh Thakur stating that it could not be done without invoking appropriate sections of CrPC. Pragya Singh Thakur later went on to be elected as Member of parliament, Lok Sabha from Bhopal in May 2019.

== See also ==
- 2006 Malegaon blasts
- 2007 Samjhauta Express bombings
- 2008 Malegoan & Modasa bombing
- List of terrorist incidents, 2007
- Saffron Terror
