= List of terrorist incidents in 2007 =

This is a timeline of incidents in 2007 that have been labelled as "terrorism" and are not believed to have been carried out by a government or its forces (see state terrorism and state-sponsored terrorism).

== Guidelines ==
- To be included, entries must be notable (have a stand-alone article) and described by a consensus of reliable sources as "terrorism".
- List entries must comply with the guidelines outlined in the manual of style under MOS:TERRORIST.
- Casualties figures in this list are the total casualties of the incident including immediate casualties and later casualties (such as people who succumbed to their wounds long after the attacks occurred).
- Casualties listed are the victims. Perpetrator casualties are listed separately (e.g. x (+y) indicate that x victims and y perpetrators were killed/injured).
- Casualty totals may be underestimated or unavailable due to a lack of information. A figure with a plus (+) sign indicates that at least that many people have died (e.g. 10+ indicates that at least 10 people have died) – the actual toll could be considerably higher. A figure with a plus (+) sign may also indicate that over that number of people are victims.
- If casualty figures are 20 or more, they will be shown in **bold**. In addition, figures for casualties more than 50 will also be **underlined**.
- Incidents are limited to one per location per day. If multiple attacks occur in the same place on the same day, they will be merged into a single incident.
- In addition to the guidelines above, the table also includes the following categories:

0 people were killed/injured by the incident.
1–19 people were killed/injured by the incident.
20–49 people were killed/injured by the incident.
50–99 people were killed/injured by the incident.
100+ people were killed/injured by the incident.

== January ==
Total incidents: 3

Date	Dead	Injured	Location	Description
January 19	1	0	Istanbul, Turkey	Assassination of Hrant Dink
January 22	131	186	Baghdad, Iraq	See 22 January 2007 Baghdad bombings.
January 29	2 (+1)	7	Dera Ismail Khan, Pakistan	January 2007 Dera Ismail Khan suicide bombing - 2 people were killed while 7 wounded when suicide bomber blew himself up.

== February ==
Total incidents: 3

Date	Dead	Injured	Location	Description
February 3	135	305	Baghdad, Iraq	Al-Sadriya district market: Truck bombing. See 3 February 2007 Baghdad market bombing.
February 3	23	20	Bagram, Afghanistan	2007 Bagram Air Base bombing
February 19	68	49	Near New Delhi, India	Samjhauta Express, a train headed toward Lahore an hour after it leaves New Delhi; two bombs explode. See 2007 Samjhauta Express bombings.

== March ==
Total incidents: 1

Date	Dead	Injured	Location	Description
March 27	152	347	Tal Afar, Iraq	Two truck bombs kill 152 people and injure 347. See 2007 Tal Afar bombings.

== April ==
Total incidents: 2

Date	Dead	Injured	Location	Description
April 18	200	251	Baghdad, Iraq	A series of explosions kills 200 people and injures 251. See 18 April 2007 Baghdad bombings.
April 28	63	70	Karbala, Iraq	A car bomb kills 63 people and injures 70.

== May ==
Total incidents: 2

Date	Dead	Injured	Location	Description
May 18	16	100	Hyderabad, India	Attack on Mecca Masjid. For details, see 18 May 2007 Mecca Masjid bombing.
May 22	9 (+1)	121	Ankara, Turkey	A suicide bombing rips through a shopping district, killing nine people and wounding dozens more. See 2007 Ankara bombing.

== June ==
Total incidents: 1

Date	Dead	Injured	Location	Description
June 29, June 30	0 (+1)	5	United Kingdom	2007 Glasgow International Airport attack, 2007 London car bombs, 2007 UK terrorist incidents. Car bomb plot, suspected Al-Qaeda. At Glasgow-International Airport, a car rams into terminal one, causing minor injuries to five people and setting off a blaze. An explosive device catches fire instead of detonating. In London's West End, an attempt to set off two car bombs by suspected cell-phone triggers fails. One car is towed before the device is discovered in an underground car park. Police link two the incidents and find suicide notes on two suspects in the London incident. Eight men are arrested, one Glasgow suspect is critically burned. One of the five men could be an associate of Dhiren Bharot, a high-level Al-Qaeda operative. Authorities say the London bombs could have caused "significant loss of life." Police link the two incidents to the same two people.

== July ==
Total incidents: 1

Date	Dead	Injured	Location	Description
July 2	10	12	Marib, Yemen	Eight Spanish tourists and two Yemenis are killed and another twelve are wounded in a suicide bombing attack at the Queen of Sheba temple.

== August ==
Total incidents: 2

Date	Dead	Injured	Location	Description
August 14	796 (+4)	1,562	Iraq	The Qahtaniyah bombings kills nearly 800; this was the Iraq War's most deadly car bomb attack during the period of major American combat operations. It was also the third deadliest act of terrorism in history, only being surpassed by the September 11 attacks in the United States and the Camp Speicher massacre in Iraq.
August 25	44	54	Hyderabad, India	Hyderabad bombings: Twin bombings kill at least 44 and injure 54. Two bombs are defused and 19 others are found unexploded. Y. S. Rajasekhara Reddy, chief minister of Andhra Pradesh state, blames Islamic militants with ties to Pakistan or Bangladesh, saying that the extremists want to foment tension between India's Hindus and Muslims. Both Bangladesh and Pakistan deny the accusations.

== September ==
Total incidents: 0

Date	Dead	Injured	Location and description

== October ==
Total incidents: 3

Date	Dead	Injured	Location	Description
October 11	3	30	India	Explosives kept in a tiffin box at a Sufi shrine by Terrorists resulted in the Ajmer sharif dargah blast while devotees were breaking fast during Ramadan. The site of the blasts was close to the Rajasthan state Chief Minister's Iftar Party.
October 18	136 (+2)	387	Karachi, Pakistan	Twin suicide bombings occur near a truck carrying former prime minister Benazir Bhutto through a crowded street of supporters eight hours after her return from exile, despite 20,000 security officers having been assigned to protect her. At least 136 are killed and 387 are wounded; Bhutto escapes unharmed. The Taliban or Al Qaeda are suspected.
October 21	12	16	Hakkâri Province, Turkey	PKK stages an attack on the Turkish outpost in Hakkari. The attack wounds 16 and kills 12 Turkish soldiers carried out of northern Iraq. Eight soldiers are kidnapped.

== November ==
Total incidents: 1

Date	Dead	Injured	Location	Description
November 23	15	80	Uttar Pradesh, India	Uttar Pradesh serial blasts. Near-simultaneous blasts triggered by militants in court premises in Varanasi, Faizabad, and Lucknow kill 15 people and injure more than 80.

== December ==
Total incidents: 3

Date	Dead	Injured	Location	Description
December 11	37	177	Algiers, Algeria	Bombings kill 37 or more and injure 177.
December 24	4	1	Aleg, Mauritania	Four French tourists are gunned down; the family's father survives, but with serious injuries. Mauritanian police say two of the three suspects are affiliated with a salafist group close to Al-Qaeda.
December 27	24 (+1)	46	Rawalpindi, Pakistan	Pakistani opposition leader Benazir Bhutto is assassinated by an attacker who shoots her after a campaign rally and then blows himself up; at least 20 others are dead. Islamist militant leader Baitullah Mehsud or elements within the Pervez Musharraf government are suspected. See Benazir Bhutto assassination.
