= List of terrorist incidents in 2006 =

This is a timeline of incidents in 2006 that have been labelled as terrorism and are not believed to have been carried out by a government or its forces (see state terrorism and state-sponsored terrorism).

== Guidelines ==
- To be included, entries must be notable (have a stand-alone article) and described by a consensus of reliable sources as "terrorism".
- List entries must comply with the guidelines outlined in the manual of style under MOS:TERRORIST.
- Casualty figures in this list are the total casualties of the incident including immediate casualties and later casualties (such as people who succumbed to their wounds long after the attacks occurred).
- Casualties listed are the victims. Perpetrator casualties are listed separately (e.g. x (+y) indicate that x victims and y perpetrators were killed/injured).
- Casualty totals may be underestimated or unavailable due to a lack of information. A figure with a plus (+) sign indicates that at least that many people have died (e.g. 10+ indicates that at least 10 people have died) – the actual toll could be considerably higher. A figure with a plus (+) sign may also indicate that over that number of people are victims.
- If casualty figures are 20 or more, they will be shown in **bold**. In addition, figures for casualties more than 50 will also be **underlined**.
- Incidents are limited to one per location per day. If multiple attacks occur in the same place on the same day, they will be merged into a single incident.
- In addition to the guidelines above, the table also includes the following categories:

0 people were killed/injured by the incident.
1–19 people were killed/injured by the incident.
20–49 people were killed/injured by the incident.
50–99 people were killed/injured by the incident.
100+ people were killed/injured by the incident.

== January ==
Total incidents: 1

Date	Type	Dead	Injured	Location	Details	Perpetrator	Part of
January 5	Suicide bombings	120+	120+	Karbala and Ramadi, Iraq	5 January 2006 Iraq bombings: Suicide bombers targeting police and Shia civilians.	Al-Qaeda in Iraq	Iraq War

== February ==
Total incidents: 1

Date	Type	Dead	Injured	Location	Details	Perpetrator	Part of
February 22	Bombing	0	0	Samarra, Iraq	2006 al-Askari mosque bombing: Al-Qaeda militants destroyed much of the Al-Askari Mosque, one of Shi'a Islam's holiest sites, in a bombing, though no one was killed or injured. Hundreds of Sunni civilians were killed by angry Shias in retaliation for the bombing.	Al-Qaeda in Iraq	Iraq War

== March ==
Total incidents: 6

Date	Type	Dead	Injured	Location	Details	Perpetrator	Part of
March 2	Suicide bombing	4 (+1)	50+	Karachi, Pakistan	2006 attack on U.S. consulate in Karachi: Bombing kills four, including a U.S. diplomat.	Islamist cell	
March 3	Vehicle attack	0	9	North Carolina, United States	2006 UNC SUV attack: An Iranian-American named Mohammed Reza Taheri-azar drove an SUV onto the campus of University of North Carolina at Chapel Hill and hit nine people. He committed attack to "avenge the deaths of Muslims worldwide".	Mohammed Reza Taheri-azar	
March 7	Bombings	28	101	Varanasi, India	2006 Varanasi bombings: Two bombings occurred at the Varanasi Junction railway station and the Sankat Mochan Hanuman Temple.	Lashkar-e-Taiba	Kashmir conflict
March 9	Hostage crisis	1	3 kidnapped	Baghdad, Iraq	Christian Peacemaker hostage crisis: Tom Fox, a Christian Peacemaker, is killed by his hostage takers. Three other peacemakers were kidnapped but were all freed.	Swords of Righteousness Brigade	Iraq War
March 10	Landmine attack	26	7	Dera Bugti, Pakistan	2006 Pakistan landmine blast: 26 people were killed and seven more injured after their car hit a land mine while they were on their way to a wedding. Pakistan accused Akbar Bugti of ordering the attack.	Akbar Bugti (suspected)	Insurgency in Balochistan
March 30	Suicide bombing	4 (+1)		Kedumim, West Bank	Kedumim bombing: Palestinian suicide bomber kills himself and four others at Kedumim Junctio.	Al-Aqsa Martyrs' Brigades	Israeli–Palestinian conflict

== April ==
Total incidents: 8

Date	Type	Dead	Injured	Location	Details	Perpetrator	Part of
April 7	Suicide bombings	85 (+3)	160	Baghdad, Iraq	Buratha mosque bombing: Three suicide bombers detonate at a Shia mosque as worshippers were leaving.	Islamist insurgents	Iraq War
April 11	Suicide bombing	63 (+1)	80	Karachi, Pakistan	Jamaat Ahle Sunnat bombing: A suicide bomber explodes himself, killing 57 Sunni worshippers.	Lashkar-e-Jhangvi	Sectarianism in Pakistan
April 14	Bombing	0	13+	Old Delhi, India	2006 Jama Masjid bombings: Two bombs explode in the courtyard of the Jama Masjid, injuring thirteen people. No one claimed responsibility.	Unknown	
April 17	Suicide bombing	11 (+1)	70	Tel Aviv, Israel	2006 Tel Aviv shawarma restaurant bombing: Sami Hammad, a Palestinian suicide bomber, detonates an explosive device, killing 11 people and injuring 70.	Islamic Jihad	Israeli–Palestinian conflict
April 22	Bombing	0	14	Kharkiv, Ukraine	2006 Kharkiv supermarket bombings: Two bombs exploded at separate markets. No one claimed responsibility.	Unknown	
April 23	Shooting	6	0	Trincomalee, Sri Lanka	Gomarankadawala massacre: Six villagers are shot to death by LTTE cadres.	LTTE	Sri Lankan Civil War
April 24	Bombings	23	80	Dahab, Egypt	2006 Dahab bombings: Three bombs targeting tourist hotspots explode, killing 23.	Jama'at al-Tawhid wal-Jihad	
April 30	Massacre	35		Doda District, India	2006 Doda massacre: LeT militants massacre 35 Hindu villagers in an attempt to disrupt peace talks between India and Pakistan.	Lashkar-e-Taiba	Kashmir conflict

== May ==
Total incidents: 0

Date	Type	Dead	Injured	Location	Details	Perpetrator	Part of

== June ==
Total incidents: 5

Date	Type	Dead	Injured	Location	Details	Perpetrator	Part of
June 2	Terrorism plot	0	0	Ontario, Canada	2006 Ontario terrorism plot: Eighteen people are arrested on suspicion of planning terror attacks in Ottawa and Toronto. The suspects were inspired by Al-Qaeda and eleven were convicted.	Islamist cell	
June 3	Abduction, executions	5	0	Baghdad, Iraq	Abduction of Russian diplomats in Iraq: Iraqi insurgents ambushed a car from the Russian Embassy, killed one of the occupants and abducted the four others. The Mujahedeen Shura Council claimed responsibility and later said they had killed the rest of the diplomats.	Mujahedeen Shura Council	Iraq War
June 12	Massacre	10		Anantnag district, India	2006 Kulgam massacre: Nine laborers and an Indian Army soldier are massacred by suspected Islamic extremists.	Hizbul Mujahideen (suspected)	Kashmir conflict
June 15	Mine attack	68	60	Kebithigollewa, Sri Lanka	Kebithigollewa massacre: The LTTE detonate two claymore mines targeting a bus carrying 140 civilians. 68 civilians, including ten children, three pregnant women and their unborns, are killed. Approximately 60 civilians are injured.	LTTE	Sri Lankan Civil War
June 25	Raid, shooting	2 (+2)	4	Kerem Shalom, Israel	2006 Gaza cross-border raid: A team of seven or eight Palestinian militants cross into Israel from the Gaza Strip and start attacking Israeli military positions. Two IDF soldiers and two attackers are killed and four more soldiers are wounded, one (Gilad Shalit) is kidnapped and held hostage for five years.	Hamas; Popular Resistance Committees; Army of Islam	Israeli–Palestinian conflict

== July ==
Total incidents: 6

Date	Type	Dead	Injured	Location	Details	Perpetrator	Part of
July 1	Suicide bombing	77	96	Sadr City, Iraq	1 July 2006 Sadr City bombing: A suicide bomber detonates a car bomb in a market in Sadr City. A group calling themselves The Supporters of the Sunni People claimed responsibility.	The Supporters of the Sunni People	Iraq War
July 6	Massacre	40+		Baghdad, Iraq	Hay al Jihad massacre: Shia militiamen massacre more than 40 Sunnis.	Shia militiamen	Iraq War
July 11	Bombings	209	714	Mumbai, India	2006 Mumbai train bombings: Seven pressure cooker bombs explode on seven Mumbai Western line trains, killing and injuring hundreds.	Indian Mujahideen	
July 11	Grenade attacks	8	43	Srinagar, India	2006 Srinagar bombings: Several grenades are thrown at vehicles carrying tourists.	Lashkar-e-Taiba (suspected)	Kashmir conflict
July 28	Shooting	1	5	Seattle, United States	Seattle Jewish Federation shooting: A man identified as Naveed Afzal Haq entered the building of the Jewish Federation of Seattle and opened fired before taking hostages and surrendering. Haq shouted "I'm a Muslim American; I'm angry at Israel" during the attack.	Naveed Afzal Haq	
July 31	Attempted bombings	0	0	Cologne, Germany	2006 German train bombing plot: Two suitcase bombs are discovered in trains near the Dortmund and Koblenz, undetonated due to an assembly error. Video footage from Cologne train station, where the bombs were put on the trains, led to the arrest of two Lebanese students in Germany, Youssef al-Hajdib and Jihad Hamad, and subsequently of three suspected co-conspirators in Lebanon. On 1 September 2006, Jörg Ziercke, head of the Bundeskriminalamt (Federal Police), reports that the suspects saw the Muhammad cartoons as an "assault by the West on Islam" and the "initial spark" for the attack, originally planned to coincide with the 2006 Football World Cup in Germany.	Youssef Mohamad el-Hajdib and Jihad Hamad	

== August ==
Total incidents: 3

Date	Type	Dead	Injured	Location	Details	Perpetrator	Part of
August 9	Terrorism plot	0	0	United Kingdom	The 2006 transatlantic aircraft plot is uncovered.	Al-Qaeda (suspected)	
August 14	Mine attack	7	17	Colombo, Sri Lanka	Attack on Pakistani ambassador to Sri Lanka: A claymore mine is detonated when a convoy carrying Pakistani Ambassador to Sri Lanka, Bashir Wali Mohamed, was passing. Mohamed was unharmed but seven people were killed and 17 more wounded. LTTE is suspected of being behind the attack.	LTTE (suspected)	Sri Lankan Civil War
August 21	Bombing	13	47	Moscow, Russia	2006 Moscow market bombing: A bomb exploded at Cherkizovsky Market, frequented by Central Asian and Caucasian immigrants. Eight members from the group Spas were convicted for the bombing.	Spas	

== September ==
Total incidents: 3

Date	Type	Dead	Injured	Location	Details	Perpetrator	Part of
September 8	Bombings	37	125+	Malegaon, India	2006 Malegaon bombings: Two bombings targeting a Mosque and a Muslim cemetery kill 37 and wound hundreds. The Students Islamic Movement of India was initially blamed but later investigation places the blame on the Hindu extremist group Abhinav Bharat	Abhinav Bharat (suspected)	
September 11	Shootdown	12	3	Vladikavkaz, Russia	2006 Vladikavkaz Mi-8 crash: An Mi-8 helicopter carrying 15 high ranking Russian officers was shot down, killing twelve of the helicopter's occupants. Ossetian rebel group Kataib al-Khoul claimed responsibility.	Kataib al-Khoul; Caucasian Front	Second Chechen War
September 16	Bombings	4	82	Hat Yai, Thailand	2006 Hat Yai bombings: four people killed, 82 injured, by six bombs along the main commercial street. The devices were placed approximately 500 meters apart, and were remotely set off every five minutes.	GMIP	South Thailand insurgency

== October ==
Total incidents: 2

Date	Type	Dead	Injured	Location	Details	Perpetrator	Part of
October 3	Hijacking	0	0	Brindisi, Italy	Turkish Airlines Flight 1476 is hijacked.	Hakan Ekinci	
October 10–11	Bombings	8	30-45	Central Mindanao, Philippines	2006 Central Mindanao bombings: Three bombings targeting markets and a town hall in Tacurong, Makilala, and Cotabato City	MILF, Abu Sayyaf, Jemaah Islamiyah (suspected)	Moro conflict

== November ==
Total incidents: 2

Date	Type	Dead	Injured	Location	Details	Perpetrator	Part of
November 20	Bombing	5	25-66	West Bengal, India	2006 West Bengal train explosion: A bomb exploded on a train traveling between New Jalpaiguri and Haldibari, killing five and injuring dozens. No once claimed responsibility.	Unknown	
November 23	Car bombings, mortar attacks	215	257	Sadr City, Iraq	23 November 2006 Sadr City bombings: Insurgents orchestrates a series of car bombings and mortar attacks on Sadr City.	Al-Qaeda in Iraq	Iraq War

== December ==
Total incidents: 2

Date	Type	Dead	Injured	Location	Details	Perpetrator	Part of
December 30	Car bombing	2	52	Madrid, Spain	2006 Madrid–Barajas Airport bombing: ETA detonates a van bomb in the parking lot of Madrid–Barajas Airport, killing two and causing significant damage.	ETA	Basque conflict
December 31	Bombings	3	38	Bangkok, Thailand	2006 Bangkok bombings: A total of nine explosions on New Year's Eve, killing three people and injuring dozens. Insurgents from Thailand's troubled Southern region were blamed.	Pattani separatists	South Thailand Insurgency
