= Surendra Babu =

Indian police officer

N.V. Surendra Babu, IPS

N.V. Surendra Babu IPS was Commissioner of the City of Vijayawada Police between 2001 and 2004. He was promoted to the rank of Inspector General of Police in 2007 as reward for his exemplary service.

Between 2006 and 2007, he served as Additional Commissioner of Hyderabad City Police for the Co-ordination Wing. His previous police service was with the Hyderabad City Police as Additional Commissioner of Police for Traffic, and included extensive and varied operational experience in dealing with the city's traffic problems.

At a strategic level he had served as ADGP of OCTOPUS - an elite Counter-terrorist force, and was a member of a small team of senior staff implementing a major restructuring of the Andhra Pradesh Police following the Mecca Masjid bombing in 2008. He was the chief co-ordinator of the drive to check the sale of spurious liquor, working as Director (Enforcement), Prohibition and Excise Department.

As Additional Commissioner of Hyderabad Police for the Co-ordination wing, he initially held the support services portfolio, with responsibility for human resources, finance, information technology and administration of justice. Responsibility for both general and specialist operational matters followed, including management of the territorial divisions, and overall responsibility for partnership activities - working with statutory and voluntary agencies within the city to enhance community safety and crime reduction. His specialist operations role included responsibility for all serious and organised crime investigations, mobile and operational support, forensic science and major incident and emergency response.

He attended the SP Training Course at the National Police Academy, Dehradun, and the Counter-Maoist Course at the Greyhounds Academy, Nallamala. He holds a BTech degree in Mechanical Engineering, and Post Graduate Diploma in Industrial Engineering(PGDIE). His B.Tech. was from NIT, Warangal and Post Graduate Diploma in Industrial Engineering(PGDIE) was from NITIE, Mumbai. He is a Fellow of the Institute of Chartered Accountants of India, and was honorary president of the Krishna District Cricket Association (KDCA). He was awarded the Rajeev Service Medal in the 2003 Independence Day's CM Honours list.
