= 2006 Malegaon bombings =

Bombings in Malegaon, Maharashtra state, India

- Malegaon (India)
- Location: Malegaon, Maharashtra, India
- Date: 8 September 2006 (UTC+5.5)
- Target: Vicinity of Mosque
- Attack type: Bombings
- Deaths: 45
- Injuries: 125+

The 2006 Malegaon bombings took place on 8 September 2006 in Malegaon, a town in the Nashik district of the Indian state of Maharashtra, some 290 km northeast of Mumbai. The Maharashtra Anti-Terrorism Squad (ATS) initially blamed the bombings on the Students Islamic Movement of India (SIMI), but in a chargesheet filed in 2013 the NIA and ATS (Anti-Terrorism Squad) joint investigation and involved evidences allegedly pointed towards the involvement of eight members of group Abhinav Bharat, who were later released from charges due to lack of evidence.

A July 2025 verdict by the special court in Mumbai acquitted all accused of the Abhinav Bharat group in the Malegaon blast case.

== Explosion ==
The explosions which resulted in at least 31 fatalities and 321 injuries, took place in a Muslim cemetery, adjacent to a mosque, at around 13:15 IST after Friday prayers on the holy day of Shab e Bara'at. Most of the blast victims were Muslim pilgrims. Security forces spoke of "two bombs attached to bicycles," but other reports indicated that three devices had exploded. A stampede ensued after the devices exploded. A curfew was imposed in the town and state paramilitary forces were deployed in sensitive areas to prevent unrest.

== Reactions ==
- Maharashtra Chief Minister Vilasrao Deshmukh promised compensation payments of Rs 100,000 (approx. €1200 or US$1500 at the time) to the next-of-kin of the deceased.
- Prime Minister Manmohan Singh condemned the blasts and appealed for calm.
- Home Minister Shivraj Patil said the incident seemed designed to "divide the various sections of the public."
- Congress party president Sonia Gandhi has called on Indians to maintain calm.
- A home ministry official in Delhi said central security forces, including personnel from the anti-riot Rapid Action Force, were sent to Malegaon.
- There were episodes of violence when Muslims in Malegaon attacked police and their vehicles following the blasts.
- Various Muslim leaders have denounced the bombings and prayed for peace. In particular, Muslims in the state of Gujarat demonstrated against Pakistan for its alleged involvement in the blasts.
- US ambassador David Mulford said he was "shocked and saddened by the brutal terrorist bombings" and that the US stood "with India in its fight against terrorism".

== Investigations ==
=== Initial arrests ===
On 10 September, NDTV reported that investigators had identified the owner of one of the bicycles on which a bomb was planted. On the same day, police released sketches of two suspects wanted in connection with the bomb attacks. On 11 September, Maharashtra Director General of Police P. S. Pasricha said that the officers investigating the blasts had produced leads and expressed confidence that a breakthrough would be achieved soon.

On 30 October, the first arrest was made of Noor-Ul-Huda, an activist of the Students Islamic Movement of India. The DGP of Mumbai said the two other suspects are Shabeer Batterywala and Raees Ahmad. On 6 November, it was reported that Batterywala is an operative of Lashkar-e-Toiba (LeT) and the co-conspirator is Raees Ahmad of SIMI.

=== Suspicions and releases ===
The Maharashtra police initially suspected Bajrang Dal, the Lashkar-e-Toiba or the Jaish-e-Mohammed of involvement in the attacks. No evidence was released against any of these groups, though the police claimed on 13 October to have identified the perpetrators. Lashkar-e-Toiba has had contacts with the controversial Students Islamic Movement of India in the region before. Police are also suspecting Harkat-ul-Jihad-al-Islami in the attacks. On 10 September, police sources said that the methods used are similar to attacks on mosques earlier in 2006 for which 16 Bajrang Dal activists, allegedly part of a "fringe group" of the organization, were arrested but not charged. Accused were Pragya Thakur and Abhinav Bharat. July 2025 verdict by the special court in Mumbai acquitted all accused in the Malegaon blast case, including former BJP MP Pragya Singh Thakur and Lieutenant Colonel Prasad Purohit.

Malegaon has been the focus of communal tension for some time, which spilled out into the open in 1984, 1992, and 2001, when there were large scale protests over the United States invasion of Afghanistan. Police had killed 12 Muslim protesters after a brief altercation with them. The Taliban regime in Afghanistan had enjoyed immense support from Muslims in Malegaon.

In May 2006, police recovered a cache of RDX explosives and automatic rifles from the region based on information they said was provided by arrested extremist Islamists. The arrested were former members of the Students Islamic Movement of India.

In the September 2006 incident, police investigations have determined that the explosives contained in these bombings were "a cocktail of RDX, ammonium nitrate and fuel oil – the same mixture used in 7/11", referring to the 11 July 2006 Mumbai train bombings, a terrorist incident for which several Islamist groups are suspects. Since the investigation was still under way, Nasik Superintendent of Police Rajvardhan declined to give details, saying: "We can't say anything till we get reports from all the agencies".

However, the Anti Terrorist Squad has prima facie ruled out the involvement of Hindu Nationalist groups like the Bajrang Dal in the Malegaon blasts citing two reasons:

1. RDX is only available to Islamist outfits.
2. Bajrang Dal activists so far have only used crude bombs, nothing as sophisticated as the ones in Malegaon.

Ajai Sahni, an intelligence analyst who tracks terrorist groups in South Asia, also said it was unlikely to be a Hindu group because they "lacked the organisation for such an attack". On 12 September 2006, Indian Prime Minister Manmohan Singh said it was inappropriate to "rule out or rule in" the involvement of Hindu groups. "I think there should be a fair investigation which inspires confidence and brings out the truth and nothing but the truth without any pre-conceived notion. That has to be the objective".

B. Raman, in an op-ed published on 11 September, noted that "while it is too early to rule out the possibility of either Islamic or Hindu extremists as the perpetrators, there have been "attempts by some leaders of the Muslim community to create a divide between the community and the police by questioning the impartiality of the police and levelling other allegations against the investigating officers".

As of 30 October 2006, the most recent arrests involved members of the Students Islamic Movement of India and suspicions are presently directed at them as, after the arrests, the police have claimed to be closer to solving the case. On 28 November 2006, Mumbai police stated that two Pakistani nationals were involved in the explosions. "We have successfully detected the Malegaon blasts case. We are, however, on the lookout for eight more suspects in the case," said DGP PS Pasricha. The Anti-Terrorism Squad probing into the case has already arrested eight suspects, including two booked in the 11 July Mumbai serial blasts, in connection with four explosions that rocked the town killing 31 people and injuring more than 200.

Three accused gave a confession about their involvement in the conspiracy, but soon after, two of them retracted before a magistrate, saying they had not made a voluntary disclosure. This was revealed to a special court by the accused themselves when they were produced before it for remand. The development assumes significance as under MCOCA, a confession does not have evidential value if it is not a voluntary and true disclosure. Seeking their remand, public prosecutor Raja Thakre said the accused had played a vital role in the conspiracy and investigations conducted by Anti-Terrorist Squad so far had revealed involvement of more persons who are yet to be arrested.

On 16 November 2011, seven of the accused in the Malegaon blasts were released on bail after five years of detention in jail.

=== Case handover ===
In 2013, after taking over the case, the National Investigation Agency (NIA) contradicted the ATS and CBI findings, and arrested four persons, namely Lokesh Sharma, Dhan Singh, Manohar Singh and Rajendra Choudhary, all belonging to the Hindu right wing group Abhinav Bharat. On 22 May 2013 they were all chargesheeted.

On 25 April 2016, the Maharashtra Control of Organised Crime Act (MCOCA) court dismissed all charges against the eight Muslim men initially arrested by the Maharashtra Anti-Terrorist Squad in 2006. The men had spent five years in jail before being released on bail in 2011.

On 7 May 2024, the National Investigation Agency (NIA) said the Maharashtra Anti Terrorist Squad (ATS) planted RDX to frame Shrikant Purohit and many others, who were tortured to take names of Hindu leaders.

== See also ==
- 2007 Samjhauta Express bombings
- 2008 Malegoan & Modasa bombing
- List of terrorist incidents, 2006
