= Hindutva terrorism =

Terrorist acts by groups of individuals who profess Hindu motivations or goals

Hindutva terrorism (also known as Hindu terrorism or saffron terror) refers to terrorist acts carried out on the basis of motivations in broad association with Hindu nationalism or Hindutva.

The phenomenon became a topic of contentious political discourse in the aftermath of the 2007–2008 attacks, which targeted Pakistanis and Muslims in India, where the accused were members, or alleged members, of Hindu nationalist organisations such as Rashtriya Swayamsevak Sangh (RSS) or Abhinav Bharat.

== Terminology ==
The term "saffron terror" was coined in 2002 by the Indian journalist Praveen Swami after the 2002 Gujarat riots, and gained popularity in the aftermath of the 2007–2008 attacks which targeted Pakistanis and Muslims and were reportedly instigated by people affiliated with Hindu nationalist organisations like Rashtriya Swayamsevak Sangh and Abhinav Bharat. The term comes from the symbolic use of the saffron colour by many Hindu nationalist organisations.

Several analysts and commentators have said that the term was being used as a smear tactic against the political opponents of Congress in the aftermath of the attacks. Kanchan Gupta and Swapan Dasgupta have said that investigators of the attacks were using the term "saffron terror" in their statements to the media to promote the agenda of the Congress.

According to Nikita Saxena writing for The Caravan, the term "Hindu terrorism" gained traction in the wake of the 2007 Samjhauta Express bombings and 2008 Malegaon blasts. A prominent reference to "Hindu terrorism" was made by Indian National Congress (INC; also known as the "Congress") member Digvijaya Singh in a 2007 campaign. (Note: The BJP criticised these statements and filed a complaint with the Election Commission of India, citing it as a violation of the Model Code of Conduct. The Election Commission issued a show-cause notice to Singh on this complaint.) Writer and activist Subhash Ghatade asserts that "most critics" have avoided describing the term as "Hindu terrorism" and instead talked about "Hindutva terrorism". Political scientist Jyotirmaya Sharma argues that "there is no Hindu terrorism" because the perpetrators do not represent the Hindu faith.

BJP leader Balbir Punj claimed, the term "Hindu terror" was invented and used by the Congress party in the aftermath of the 2007–2008 incidents in order to denounce the party's political opposition as terrorists. In the 2018 book Hindu Terror: Insider Account of Ministry of Home Affairs, Ramaswamy Venkata Subra Mani, a former officer in the Home Ministry, alleged that the United Progressive Alliance (UPA) government had forced Home Ministry officials to manufacture a narrative about the presence of "Hindu terror".

Former Home Minister of India and Congress member P. Chidambaram urged Indians to beware of "saffron terror" during an August 2010 meeting of state police chiefs in New Delhi; his remark met with backlash from politicians and Hindu religious figures.

== Attacks ==
=== Attacks by NDA ===
Nepalese Hindu extremist group Nepal Defence Army has been involved in carrying a series of bombing of Mosques and Churches in Nepal in the 21st century. As of December 2011, NDA's leader Ram Prasad Mainali was serving life imprisonment for his role in bombing a church in Kathmandu.

=== 2007 Samjhauta Express bombings ===
Twin blasts shook two coaches of the Samjhauta Express around midnight on 18 February 2007. Sixty-eight people were killed in the ensuing fire and dozens were injured. It was originally linked to Abhinav Bharat, a Hindu fundamentalist group. On 8 January 2011, Swami Aseemanand, a pracharak of the Rashtriya Swayamsevak Sangh (RSS), made a confession that he had been involved in the bombing of Samjhauta Express - a statement he later said was made under duress.

There have also been allegations that Lashkar-e-Taiba (LeT) was responsible for the bombings. The United States and subsequently the United Nations Security Council added Arif Qasmani, a Pakistani national and LeT financier, to their sanction lists, stating that he had facilitated the bombings.

On 20 March 2019, Special NIA court acquitted all four accused. "The NIA Special Court has concluded that the investigating agency has failed to prove the conspiracy charge and ruled that accused deserve a benefit of doubt", NIA Counsel RK Handa said.

=== 2007 Ajmer Dargah attack ===
The Ajmer Dargah blast occurred on 11 October 2007, outside the Dargah (shrine) of Sufi saint Moinuddin Chishti in Ajmer, Rajasthan, allegedly by the Hindutva organisation Rashtriya Swayamsevak Sangh (RSS) and its groups. On 22 October 2010, five accused perpetrators, of which four said to belong to the RSS, were arrested in connection with the blast. Swami Aseemanand, in his confession, implicated the then General Secretary Mohan Bhagwat for ordering the terrorist strike. Bhavesh Patel, another accused in the bombings, has corroborated these statements but later claimed that the Home Minister Sushilkumar Shinde and some other Congress leaders forced him to implicate the RSS leaders.

On 8 March 2017, a special National Investigation Agency court in Jaipur found guilty three accused, Bhavesh Patel, Devendra Gupta, and Sunil Joshi (who was murdered in 2007). Both Patel and Gupta were awarded life imprisonments and imposed a fine of Rs 5,000 and Rs 10,000 respectively. Swami Aseemanand and 6 other accused were acquitted, giving them the "benefit of doubt".

=== 2008 western India bombings ===
On 29 September 2008, three bombs exploded in the States of Gujarat and Maharashtra killing 8 persons and injuring 80. During the investigation in Maharashtra, the Hindu extremist group Abhinav Bharat was found to be responsible for the blasts. (Note: Material seized during house arrests has shown that the Hindu militants who were responsible for this attack were all members of a new group, Abhinav Bharat, engaging in violent action.) Three of the arrested persons were identified as Pragya Singh Thakur, Shiv Narayan Gopal Singh Kalsanghra and Shyam Bhawarlal Sahu. All three were produced before the Chief Judicial Magistrate's court in Nashik, which remanded them to custody till 3 November. On 28 October, the Shiv Sena, came out in support of the accused saying that the arrests were merely political in nature. Lending credence to this, the party chief, Uddhav Thackeray, pointed out a potential conflict of interest in political rivalry as the Nationalist Congress Party (NCP) controlled the relevant ministry. Army officer Prasad Shrikant Purohit was also accused of being involved in the blast. His counsel alleged that he was being falsely framed for political reasons because he has intelligence data of a sensitive nature pertaining to the operations of Students Islamic Movement of India (SIMI) and Pakistan's Inter-Services Intelligence, which could embarrass some quarters.

The National Investigation Agency (NIA) has reportedly found no evidence against Pragya Singh Thakur and it has recommended the court to drop all charges against her. following which the Bombay High Court granted bail to Pragya Thakur on 22 April 2017. On 31 July 2025, all seven accused were acquitted by a special NIA court.

Reportedly, the terms "Hindu terror" and "saffron terror" were used to describe this event in mainstream Indian media. In an analysis of the security situation during this period, B. Raman referred to acts of alleged reprisal terrorism by Hindus, criticizing "politicisation and communalisation of the investigative process" as leading to a "paralysis of the investigation machinery."

== Other incidents ==
Members of Abhinav Bharat have been alleged to have been involved in a plot to kill Rashtriya Swayamsevak Sangh President Mohan Bhagwat, Headlines Today released a recorded video tested by the Central Forensic Science Laboratory which indicated the uncovering of an alleged plot to assassinate the Vice President of India Hamid Ansari. Tehelka also released alleged audio tape transcripts of main conspirators of Abhinav Bharat, which indicated involvement of Military intelligence officers with the Abhinav Bharat group, in their January 2011 edition.

The Indian Home Secretary R. K. Singh said that at least 10 people having close links with the Rashtriya Swayamsevak Sangh (RSS) and its affiliated organisations were named accused in various acts of terror across India.

According to released documents by WikiLeaks, Congress(I) party's general secretary Rahul Gandhi remarked to US Ambassador Tim Roemer, at a luncheon hosted by Prime Minister of India at his residence in July 2009, that the RSS was a "bigger threat" to India than the Lashkar-e-Taiba. At The Annual Conference of Director Generals of Police held in New Delhi on 16 September 2011, a special director of the Intelligence Bureau (IB) reportedly informed the state police chiefs that Hindutva activists have either been suspected or are under investigation in 16 incidents of bomb blasts in the country.

== See also ==
- 2024 attack on the Bangladesh Assistant High Commission in India
- Cow vigilante violence in India
- Godse's Children: Hindutva Terror in India
- Makkah Masjid blast
- Saffronisation
