= 2006 transatlantic aircraft plot =

Foiled terrorist plot in the United Kingdom

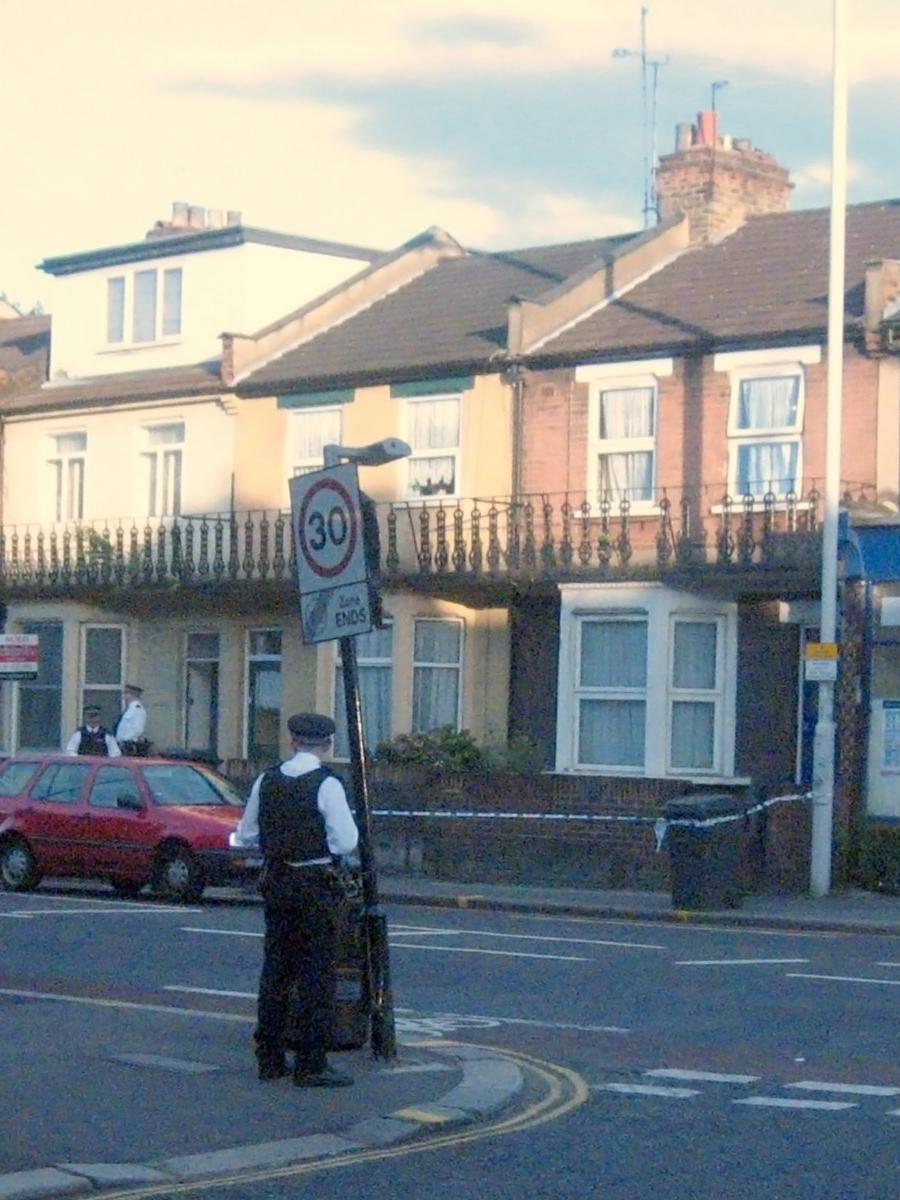
- Police at the scene of one of the raids in Walthamstow, London.
- Date: Foiled on 9 August 2006
- Target: Commercial transatlantic flights flying from the United Kingdom to North America
- Attack type: Suicide attack, bombing
- Weapon: Improvised liquid explosives
- Accused: 24
- Convictions: 7

The 2006 transatlantic aircraft plot was a terrorist plot to detonate liquid explosives, carried aboard airliners travelling from the United Kingdom to the United States and Canada, disguised as soft drinks. The plot was discovered by British Metropolitan Police during an extensive surveillance operation. As a result of the plot, unprecedented security measures were initially implemented at airports. The measures were gradually relaxed during the following weeks, but as of 2026, passengers are still not allowed to carry liquid containers larger than 100 ml (3.4 US fl oz) onto commercial aircraft at most airports around the world.

Of the 24 suspects who were arrested in and around London on the night of 9 August 2006, eight were tried initially for terrorism offences associated with the plot. The first trial occurred from April to September 2008. The jury failed to reach a verdict on charges of conspiracy to kill by blowing up aircraft, but did find three men guilty of conspiracy to murder and acquitted one other of all charges. In September 2009, a second trial (of the now seven originally accused but with the addition of another man) found three men guilty of conspiracy to kill by blowing up aircraft and one other guilty of conspiracy to murder, while the 'additional' man was exonerated of all terrorism charges.

During July 2010, a further three of the accused were found guilty at a third trial at Woolwich Crown Court of conspiracy to murder. Thus, of the nine men tried, two were acquitted and seven found guilty of conspiracy charges.

== Surveillance ==
In Pakistan, a British man from Birmingham named Rashid Rauf is believed to have put plotters in touch with al-Qaeda's leadership. When Abdulla Ahmed Ali, who was being surveilled by police, returned from Pakistan in June 2006, investigators covertly opened his baggage. Inside they found a powdered soft drink—Tang—and a large number of batteries, which raised suspicions; in the following weeks the police mounted the UK's largest surveillance operation, calling on an additional 220 officers from other forces.

Assad Sarwar (from High Wycombe) was seen buying items that did not seem consistent with his daily needs. On one occasion surveillance officers watched him dispose of empty hydrogen peroxide bottles at a recycling centre. Sarwar and Ali were seen meeting in an east London park. When MI5 covertly entered a flat being used by Ali, they found what appeared to be a bomb factory. They installed a camera and microphone and on 3 August, Ali and Tanvir Husain were filmed constructing devices out of drink bottles. Surveillance officers later watched Ali spend two hours in an Internet cafe researching flight timetables.

== Arrests ==
On 9 August 2006, British police arrested 24 people for questioning. The arrests were made in London, Birmingham, and High Wycombe, Buckinghamshire, in an overnight operation. Two of the arrests were made in the Birmingham area and five were made in High Wycombe; firearms officers were not involved in the arrests. The key suspects were British-born Muslims, some of Pakistani descent. Three of the suspects were recent converts to Islam.

Eight of the suspects were later charged with conspiracy to murder and commit acts of terrorism, a further three with failing to disclose information about acts of terrorism, and one youth with possession of articles related to a terrorist act. Others were released without charge.

Police said they had been observing the plot evolve for months, and that the "investigation reached a critical point" on the night of 9 August 2006 when the decision was made to take urgent action in order to disrupt possible execution of the plot. An undercover British agent had infiltrated the group, according to CNN sources. According to Franco Frattini, the European Commissioner for Justice, Freedom & Security, "the plotters received a very short message to 'Go now' ", while British officials denied any explicit message existed. However, it was not clear when the attacks were planned to have been begun, and the New York Times has since reported that the plans were at an earlier stage than had been stated initially.

British authorities performed a total of 69 searches of residences, businesses, vehicles and open spaces, which found possible bomb-making equipment and chemicals including hydrogen peroxide, Deputy Assistant Commissioner Peter Clarke said on 21 August 2006. "As well as the bomb-making equipment, we have found more than 400 computers, 200 mobile telephones and 8,000 items of removable storage media such as Memory Sticks, CDs and DVDs," he said. "So far, from the computers alone, we have removed some 6 terabytes of data." It will take "many months" for investigators to analyse all of the data, he said. Police said they found a list of flights on a memory stick belonging to Mr. Ali after his arrest. The memory stick listed scheduled flights from three carriers – American Airlines, United Airlines and Air Canada.

=== Disagreement over when to make the arrests ===
NBC News reported disagreement between the United States and the United Kingdom over when to make the arrests. According to NBC News, a senior British official contended that an attack was not imminent, noting that the suspects had not yet purchased airline tickets and some did not even have passports; he had urged that the investigation continue to collect more evidence.

The same source also told NBC News that the United States had threatened to use extraordinary rendition on suspected ringleader Rashid Rauf in Pakistan, or to pressure the Pakistan government to arrest him. A United States official acknowledged disagreement over the timing of arrests and that British officials had believed that an attack was not imminent. However, Frances Townsend, Assistant to the President for Homeland Security, denied the report of a dispute: "There was no disagreement between US and UK officials."

In Ron Suskind's book The Way of the World (2008), Vice President Dick Cheney is reported to have "ordered" the arrest of Rauf in Pakistan in August 2006, as an attempt to provide "good news" prior to the US 2006 mid-term elections.

== Terrorist plot ==
The plotters planned to use peroxide-based liquid explosives; the Metropolitan Police said that the plot involved acetone peroxide, (TATP), which is sensitive to heat, shock, and friction, and can be initiated with fire or an electrical charge, and can also be used to produce improvised detonators.

During the trial of the conspirators, the prosecution stated that each bomber would board a plane with the "necessary ingredients and equipment". They would then construct the devices mid-flight and detonate them. The hydrogen peroxide would be placed in 500 mL (17 US fl oz) plastic bottles of the Oasis and Lucozade soft drinks. A sugary drink powder, Tang, would be mixed with the hydrogen peroxide to colour it to resemble a normal soft drink. Hydrogen peroxide is widely available for use as hair bleach and along with the other ingredients can become explosive if mixed to a specific strength. The mixture would be injected into the bottles with a syringe. The bottle's cap would not have been removed and the hole would have been resealed, thereby allowing the device to resemble a normal, unopened drink bottle when screened by airport security. The use of liquid explosives with dissolved powder is similar to the composition used in the 21 July 2005 London bombings, using hydrogen peroxide and chapati flour, activated by a detonator.

A second substance, a type of high explosive, would be hidden within an AA battery casing; this small explosive charge would detonate the main bomb. The charge would be detonated by linking the bottle of explosives to a light bulb and a disposable camera. The charge from the camera's flash unit would trigger the explosion.

On 28 August 2006 the New York Times reported that seven martyrdom tapes made by six suspects were recovered. This number was not confirmed by the prosecution during the subsequent trial.

=== Flights targeted ===
Prosecutors at the court hearing said that the suspects had talked about including 18 suicide bombers and that they had examined Denver, Boston, and Miami as possible flight destinations to target along with the following flights, details of which they had put on USB flash drives.

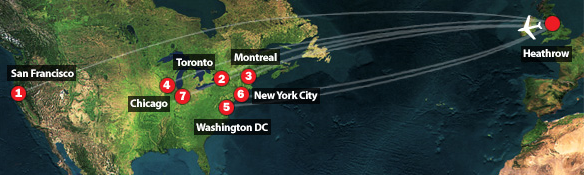
Targeted flights

All flights were departures from London Heathrow Airport, London.

- (United States) United Airlines Flight 931 to San Francisco Airport, California departing at 14:15 on a Boeing 777
- Air Canada Flight 849 to Pearson Airport, Toronto, Ontario, Canada departing at 15:00 on an Airbus A330
- Air Canada Flight 865 to Trudeau Airport, Montreal, Quebec, Canada departing at 15:15 on an Airbus A330
- (United States) United Airlines Flight 959 to O'Hare Airport, Chicago, Illinois departing at 15:40 on a Boeing 777
- (United States) United Airlines Flight 925 to Dulles Airport, Washington, D.C. departing at 16:20 on a Boeing 777
- (United States) American Airlines Flight 131 to JFK International Airport, New York City departing at 16:35 on a Boeing 777
- (United States) American Airlines Flight 91 to O'Hare Airport, Chicago, Illinois departing at 16:50 on a Boeing 777

=== Responsibility ===
There was speculation that the militant Islamic organisation al-Qaeda could be organizing the plot. One of the suspects' martyrdom video had extracts taken from a fatwa by Osama bin Laden. United States Department of Homeland Security (DHS) Secretary Chertoff stated the plot, which was "getting close to the execution phase", was "suggestive of an al-Qaeda plot".

In their martyrdom tapes, the suspects quoted from the Quran, claimed they were seeking revenge for the foreign policy of the United States, and "their accomplices, the U.K. and the Jews" and hoped God would be "pleased with us and accepts our deed". It also called upon other Muslims to join jihad, and justified the killing of innocent civilians in Western countries.

=== Alleged Pakistani involvement ===
Press reports claimed that the bombers were funded by "charities" intended to help victims of the 2005 Kashmir earthquake. The FBI and Scotland Yard investigated links to militants and the flow of money to the conspirators. Pakistan and international press also reported that Rashid Rauf had links with the Jaish-e-Mohammed, a Kashmir militant group banned by several countries. Media reports state that he has close family ties to Maulana Masood Azhar, one of the most wanted criminals in India.

In Pakistan, law enforcement authorities interrogated Rashid Rauf, a Briton of Pakistani descent, over his alleged key role in the plot. Pakistani Interior Minister Aftab Khan Sherpao said British police were conducting inquiries in Pakistan but were not involved in questioning Rauf. The UK Foreign Office sought Rauf's extradition from Pakistan, and it was reported that Pakistan planned to accept the request. However, in mid-December 2006, terrorism charges against Rauf were dropped by a Pakistani judge, who ruled there was a lack of evidence. Rauf's case was transferred from a terrorism court to a regular court where he was charged with lesser crimes including forgery. The charges were later dismissed. Rauf was reported killed in a US drone attack in Pakistan in November 2008.

== Public announcement ==
On 10 August 2006, British Home Secretary John Reid, broke the news, along with Douglas Alexander, the Transport Secretary. The same day, Deputy Commissioner of the Metropolitan Police, Paul Stephenson, said that a plot, intended to destroy as many as ten aircraft in mid-flight from the United Kingdom to the United States using explosives brought on board in the suspects' hand luggage, had been disrupted. News media reported that planned targets included American Airlines, British Airways, Continental Airlines, and United Airlines flights from London Heathrow and London Gatwick airports to Chicago, Illinois; Los Angeles; Miami; Orlando; Boston; Newark; New York City; San Francisco; Cleveland and Washington, D.C. Air Canada flights were also included, with destinations being Montreal and Toronto. BBC security correspondent Gordon Corera said the plot involved a series of simultaneous attacks, targeting three planes each time. Reports vary regarding the number of planes involved, ranging from three to twelve. In a press release, the United States Secretary of Homeland Security, Michael Chertoff, said "multiple commercial aircraft" were targeted. Some reports say the attacks were planned for 16 August, but police said no evidence of any specific date had been found. British officials later stated that the estimate of ten aircraft was "speculative and exaggerated".

In the United States, the announcement was made during a joint press conference by the Secretary of Homeland Security, Michael Chertoff, the Attorney General Alberto Gonzales, the Administrator of the Transportation Security Administration Kip Hawley and the Director of the FBI, Robert Mueller. Chertoff refused to be drawn on questions about the design of the devices or whether any bombs had actually been built.

On the same day, President George W. Bush commented upon arrival in Wisconsin: "The recent arrests that our fellow citizens are now learning about are a stark reminder that this nation is at war with Islamic fascists who will use any means to destroy those of us who love freedom, to hurt our nation."

Prior to the arrests, the plot had been discussed at the highest levels of government; Prime Minister Tony Blair had known about it for months, and had discussed it with President George W. Bush on a number of occasions.

== Responses ==
- Prime Minister Tony Blair was on holiday during these events, but decided not to return to the UK. Blair had been notified of the raid prior to its occurrence, and kept in constant contact with officials. He briefed President George W. Bush about the raid overnight.
- Britain's Deputy Prime Minister, John Prescott, running the UK government during Tony Blair's holiday, paid tribute to the way the UK reacted to what he called an "extraordinary past 36 hours... in the efforts to protect this country". He expressed his "deepest appreciation" to the "real dedication" shown by security services, police, transport staff and aviation companies and praised Home Secretary, John Reid, and Transport Secretary Douglas Alexander. Prescott added that the British public had acted "calmly, sensitively and with great patience".
- On 12 August, British Muslim groups sent an open letter to the Prime Minister, stating that "current British government policy risks putting civilians at increased risk both in the UK and abroad." The letter also stated "Attacking civilians is never justified", and encouraged the UK to reassess its foreign policy in order to maintain the safety of individuals both in the UK and abroad. In interviews with the BBC the following day, John Reid (then Home Secretary) described the letter as "a dreadful misjudgement", and former Conservative leader Michael Howard described it as "a form of blackmail".

=== Scepticism in response to the arrests ===
Several commentators expressed scepticism over the allegations. Many mentioned the Forest Gate raid, the shooting of Jean Charles de Menezes and the Iraq War, all based on intelligence that turned out to be wrong, as reasons for their doubts.

Technology news website The Register explored the practicalities of producing TATP on board a plane from constituent liquids and concluded that, while theoretically possible, the chances of success would be extremely low. Later, following additional details revealed at the trial, The Register wrote that the plot and bombing method chosen were viable.

Lieutenant-Colonel Nigel Wylde, a former senior British Army Intelligence Officer, declared the plot to be "fiction", an invention of the UK security services intended to justify new security measures that threatened to permanently curtail civil liberties. He said the explosives in question could not possibly have been produced on the plane.

== Security repercussions ==
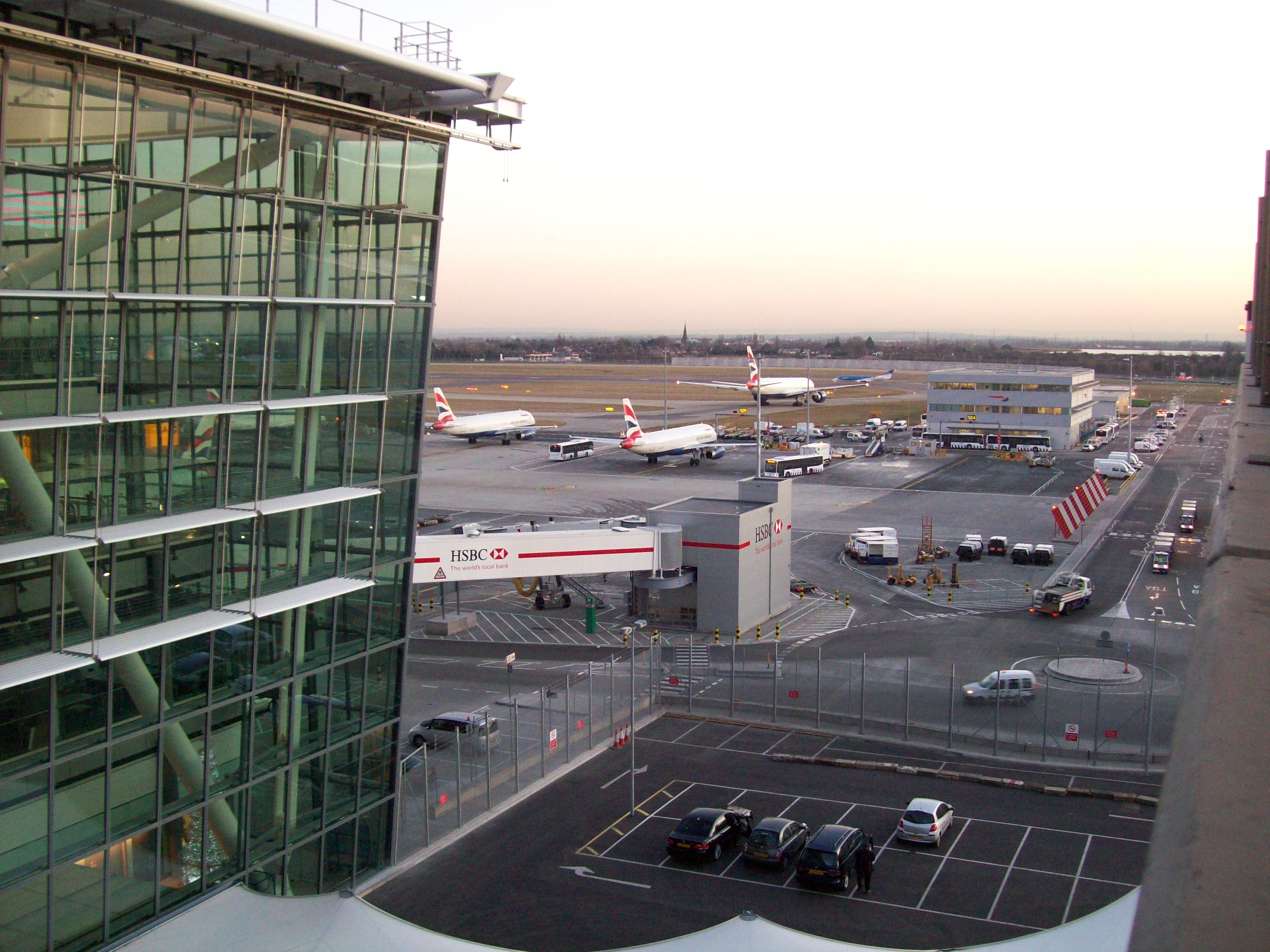
London Heathrow Airport

In the immediate aftermath of the first arrests, passengers were forbidden from carrying any liquids, apart from baby milk, onto flights between the United States and the United Kingdom. Since passengers could purchase beverages after passing airport security checkpoints in some American airports, gate checkpoints were also introduced at such airports.

As of 2026 passengers are still not allowed to carry liquid containers larger than 100 mL (3.4 US fl oz) onto commercial aircraft in their hand luggage in many airports around the world. However as airports install advanced computed tomography (CT) scanners, those restrictions are gradually being removed or relaxed.

=== United Kingdom ===
Following the raids, the UK terror alert level was raised by the Joint Terrorist Analysis Centre from 'Severe' to 'Critical', signalling an attack was believed to be imminent. On 14 August 2006 the threat level was reduced from 'Critical' to 'Severe'.

Immediately following the raids, no hand luggage was allowed except for essentials, such as travel documents and wallets. Limited hand baggage was reintroduced at some smaller airports on 14 August, but was not permitted at Heathrow and Gatwick Airports until 15 August. Some restrictions were relaxed in September 2006, and on 6 November 2006 restrictions were again relaxed to allow limited volumes of liquids to be carried into the cabin.

In March 2020 Jonathan Evans, former Director General, MI5, gave an interview saying the aircraft plot "felt like some of the later-stage investigations into Irish terrorism that we had been doing. Because we had good intelligence coverage of what the Irish terrorist cells were doing, we could intervene at the relevant point, and we felt like we had a good insight into individual plots that were being prepared".

=== United States ===
Following the operation, United States Homeland Security banned all liquids and gels except baby formula and prescription medicines in the name of the ticket holder in carry-on luggage on all flights. The DHS level in the United States was raised to 'Severe' (red) for all flights from the UK. The terror level for all other domestic or non-British international flights to the United States was raised to 'High' (orange).

From 13 August 2006, airline passengers in the United States could take up to 3.4 US fl oz (101 ml) of non-prescription medicine, glucose gel for diabetics, solid lipstick, and baby food aboard flights. The TSA also ruled that passengers must remove their shoes so they could be X-rayed before boarding. Eventually passengers were allowed to carry only 100 ml (3.5 imp fl oz; 3.4 US fl oz) of liquid in their hand luggage, TSA standards required all non-medical liquids to be kept in a quart-sized plastic bag, with only one bag per passenger.

== Effects ==
Overall, an estimated 400,000 passengers were affected because of the alerts. It has been estimated that the first day of delays cost the airlines over £175 million. As many as 20,000 bags are believed to have been misplaced at Heathrow.

A 2022 article offers an assessment of the impact of Operation Overt and refers to Rashid Rauf's alleged role.

=== Flight cancellations ===
All international inbound flights to London Heathrow Airport were cancelled on the day of the arrests except those already en route. Some flights to and from London Gatwick Airport were also suspended. Later on that evening, some flights had resumed; shorter flights were resumed around 6pm. However, passengers boarding planes were told they could only carry boarding passes and passports. All other belongings were to be checked in with the rest of their luggage.

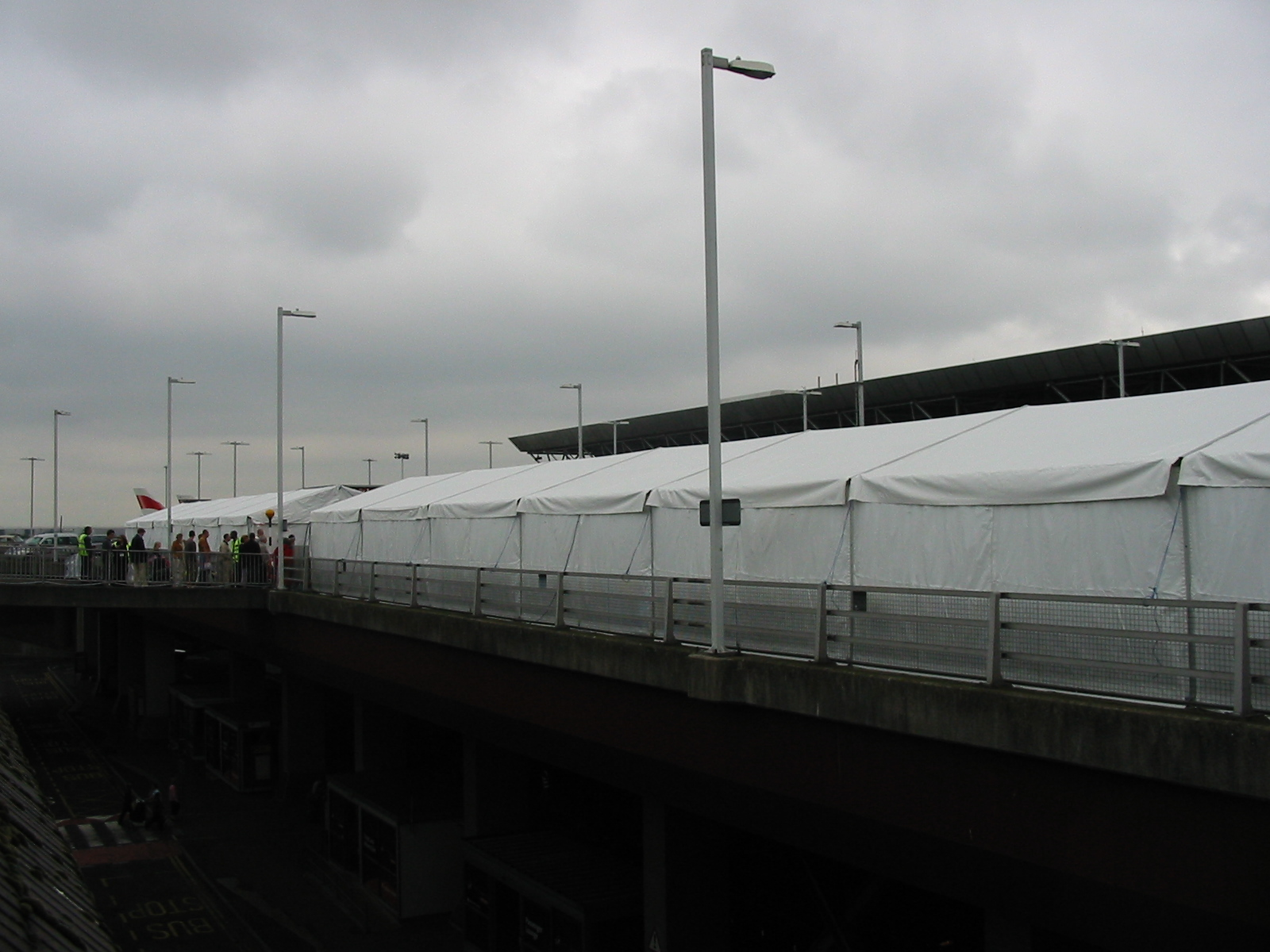
Tents on the car park in front of terminal 4. Heathrow, 14 August. Erected to give people a place to stay while waiting for their flight to depart

A few hours after the beginning of the confusion, aircraft began to fly out of London Heathrow, although in reduced numbers. The situation remained chaotic, with long queues of passengers waiting to check in and get through the strengthened security procedures. Some aircraft were reportedly leaving Heathrow with only transit (i.e., connecting passengers hence already screened elsewhere though not for the 100 mL (3.4 US fl oz) limit on hand luggage) passengers aboard.

On Sunday, 13 August, 30% of flights out of Heathrow were cancelled to reduce pressure on screeners. By 15 August, flight cancellations had fallen to 47 flights at Heathrow, and 8 Ryanair flights from Stansted. It was reported by BA that 10,000 items of baggage belonging to their passengers had gone missing. It was anticipated that cancellations would reduce on 16 August, with 90% of flights expected to depart as scheduled.

=== Controversy over the alert ===
On 12 August, a public argument broke out between BAA, the operator of Heathrow and other airports, and British Airways, with Willie Walsh, BA's chief executive, accusing BAA of not being able to cope with the increased security and baggage checks. Ryanair also called on the British government to employ police and military reservists to speed up the full body searches which were now mandated.

Three days later, on 12 August, BAA ordered airlines using the airport to make a 30% reduction in departing passenger flights (something BA was already having to do, as many passengers missed flights due to the extra time it took to clear security), to help reduce delays and cancellations.

On 18 August, Ryanair's CEO, Michael O'Leary delivered an ultimatum to the British government, demanding the resumption of normal hand baggage dimensions and hand screening one passenger in four instead of one in two within one week, otherwise Ryanair would sue the government for compensation under section 93 of the Transport Act 2000. The government responded that the actions were taken under the Aviation Security Act 1982, and no compensation was payable.

Several pilots complained about the "ridiculous" luggage restrictions that were thought up by "utter morons". Carolyn Evans, head of flight safety at the British Airline Pilots Association, said that "the procedures put in place are not sustainable long-term, and unless the passengers are treated more reasonably, we will not have an industry left".

The British government was criticised for scare mongering as a result of its response to the alert and for using it to drive through unpopular reforms.

=== Economic effects ===
The Times commented on the day after the arrests that the economic effects were minor. It observed that the real commercial risk is that "people may stop travelling ... because they are tired of complying with necessary security measures."

British Airways cancelled 1,280 flights, at an estimated cost of £40 million. Ryanair had to cancel 500 flights at an estimated cost of £3.3 million. EasyJet had to cancel 469 flights, at a cost of about £4 million. BAA said the alert cost them £13 million. In November 2006, BA also claimed the increased security measures since August had cost it £100 million.

Air passengers also switched to other means of travel, including ferries operating from Dover to Calais, and Eurostar.

On 13 August 2006, Michael O'Leary, chief executive of Ryanair, claimed that the chaos at airports meant that the terrorists were achieving their aims.

== Trials and sentencing ==
Following the August 2006 arrests, The New York Times blocked IP addresses in Britain from accessing a story titled "Details Emerge in British Terror Case." This arose as a result of a requirement in British law that prejudicial information about a defendant may not be published before a trial. Using software technology designed for targeted advertising, The New York Times was able to comply with the UK's stricter laws.

In 2008, eight men (Ahmed Abdullah Ali, Assad Sarwar, Tanvir Hussain, Ibrahim Savant, Arafat Khan, Waheed Zaman, Umar Islam, Mohammed Gulzar) were tried in connection with the plot. The trial began in April 2008, with the exhibition of what were described as 'suicide videos' made by Ali, Hussain, Savant, Khan, Zaman, and Islam, and the allegation that the suspects had bought chemicals. Intercepted emails and phone calls were not allowed as evidence at the first trial.

In their defence, the seven men, six of whom had recorded videos denouncing Western foreign policy, said they had only planned to cause a political spectacle and not to kill anyone. Ali told the court that he intended to make a political statement by letting off a small device at Heathrow and scaring people and that the plot did not involve attacking planes. All the accused, except for Gulzar, admitted plotting to cause a public nuisance. Ali, Sarwar and Hussein also pleaded guilty to conspiracy to cause explosions.

On 7 September 2008 after more than 50 hours of deliberations, the jury found Ali, Sarwar and Hussein guilty of conspiracy to murder but were unable to reach verdicts on charges of conspiracy to murder by blowing up aircraft for them and Islam. Three of the other accused were found not guilty on the latter charges.

Mohammad Gulzar was acquitted on all counts.

On 7 September 2009, the second jury at Woolwich Crown Court found Ali, Sarwar and Hussain guilty of "conspiracy to murder involving liquid bombs" and that the targets of the conspiracy were airline passengers. The plot was said at court to have been discovered by MI5 using covert listening devices in a flat in east London. The jurors were unable to reach verdicts on the charges against Savant, Khan, Zaman or Islam. Islam was however convicted on a separate charge of conspiracy to murder.

At Woolwich Crown Court on 14 September 2009, Mr Justice Henriques sentenced Ali, Sarwar, Hussain and Islam to life imprisonment. Ali, described as 'the ringleader', was ordered to serve at least 40 years. Sarwar was ordered to serve at least 36 years, while Hussain was jailed for at least 32 years. Islam, convicted of the more general 'conspiracy to murder' charge, was ordered to serve a minimum of 22 years.

At the same 2009 Woolwich trial, Donald Stewart-Whyte, who had not been charged at the 2008 trial, pleaded guilty to possession of a loaded gun, but was cleared of all terrorism offences.

At the third trial in July 2010 at Woolwich Crown Court, Savant, Khan and Zaman were found guilty and sentenced to life imprisonment for the lesser charge of conspiracy to murder. All were ordered to serve a minimum of 20 years in prison.

== See also ==
- List of terrorist incidents, 2006
- List of terrorist incidents in the United Kingdom
