= Godse's Children: Hindutva Terror in India =

2011 Indian political history book by Subhash Gatade

- Editors: Subhash Gatade
- Language: English
- Publisher: Pharos Media & Publishing
- Publication date: 2011
- Publication place: India
- ISBN: 978-8172210526

Godse's Children: Hindutva Terror in India is a 2011 Indian political history book by Indian journalist Subhash Gatade that focuses on the phenomenon of Hindutva terrorism.

== Narrative ==
In the 2011 book, which has been labelled "contentious", Gatade introduces Mahatma Gandhi's murderer Nathuram Godse as "the first terrorist in independent India" and the assassination of Mahatma Gandhi "as the first terrorist activity". In a 2012 review of Gatade's work, reviewer Rohini Hensman concurred that if terrorism is defined as violence in pursuit of a political goal, then the assassination of Gandhi "could indeed be seen as a terrorist act".

Gatade depicts Godse as neither "just a representative of the Hindutva forces in whose hands he was a mere pawn", and focused not on the assassination itself by Godse as "a symbol of terrorism, a preamble of a wider politics of Hindu domination, a harbinger of Hindutva terrorism in India".

In the book, Gatade also narrates how investigations into the 2006 Mumbai train bombings in India had "progressively revealed a unified or coordinated network of conspirators, all implicated with the RSS", centered on Indore. He asserts that the RSS has a strategy of outsourcing tension, while publicly disowning it, but that this subterfuge is "not vastly more credible than its disowning of Godse himself".

A further thrust of the work is about shortcomings in India's law enforcement agencies, which Gatade contests "entertain institutional bias against Muslims", being "forthcoming in implicating innocent Muslim youths" and engaging "in communal witch-hunts and extra judicial killings". India's media is also chastised for "pushing forward the Muslim terrorist narrative" and distorting events, including by notably giving little heed to stories where the innocent victims of wrongful arrests have been acquitted by the courts.

Gatade asserts that "while full fledged fascism may by the preserve of the Sangh Parivar", the softer communalism of other parties, such as their hostility to religious conversion, also nurtures extremism.

== Critical reception ==
In his remarks on the author's delivery, Hensman notes that "Gatade belong[s] to the small section of left-wing writers and activists who take the task of combating the growth of fascism in India seriously".
