= Nepal Defence Army =

The Nepal Defence Army is a Hindu extremist group in Nepal. They were responsible for a bombing of a church in Kathmandu in 2009, and also attempted another triple bombing in 2012.

They call for the return of the Nepalese Hindu Monarchy.
