= Abhinav Bharat =

Indian Hindutva organisation

- Founders: Ramesh Upadhyay; Prasad Shrikant Purohit; Pragya Singh Thakur
- Founded: 2006; 20 years ago
- Headquarters: Mumbai
- Active regions: India
- Ideology: Hindutva
- Status: Dormant (several leaders on trial for terrorism)

Abhinav Bharat is a Hindutva organization founded by retired Indian Army Major Ramesh Upadhyay in 2006 in Pune, India. It has a large base in Madhya Pradesh. The organization is believed to be the revived form of the pre-Independence era Abhinav Bharat Society. The activities of the organisations received widespread attention after Maharashtra Anti Terrorist Squad (ATS) arrested its member for the 2006 Malegaon bombings case. It has no relationship to the Mumbai-based charitable trust of the same name.

== History ==
Abhinav Bharat was named after the Abhinav Bharat Society, an organisation founded by Vinayak Damodar Savarkar in 1904. The original organization believed in armed revolution, and was responsible for the assassinations of some officers of the ruling British government before being disbanded in 1952.

The current Abhinav Bharat was founded in 2006 by Ramesh Upadhyay and lieutenant-colonel Prasad Shrikant Purohit. The first few meetings of the new group took place in 2007. Himani Savarkar, the niece of Nathuram Godse and the wife of Vinayak Savarkar's nephew, was elected president of the group in 2008. During the first few meetings of the organisation, the members discussed the idea that Hinduism was in danger and needed to be defended. In 2008, several of its members were arrested on suspicion of being involved in the 2006 Malegaon bombings, and its official website was closed down.

== Relationship with Sangh Parivar groups ==
Sangh Parivar representatives have distanced themselves from Abhinav Bharat (AB). Praveen Togadia, the former head of the VHP, fears that Abhinav Bharat is diverting radicals from the VHP, from where much of the Abhinav Bharat membership originates. Abhinav Bharat has also been accused of plotting to kill senior RSS leaders, including RSS Chief Mohan Bhagwat, who they thought wasn't doing enough for Hindutva.

The Caravan conducted interviews of Swami Aseemanand to publish an exclusive profile, in which he named Bhagwat in relation to 2007 Samjhauta Express bombings, Ajmer Dargah attack and Mecca Masjid bombing. Later, Aseemanand called the magazine article "fabricated" and threatened to launch legal action against the article's author. However, the Caravan defended its report and released tape recordings and transcripts of the interviews. The National Investigation Agency (NIA), which was investigating Aseemanand, said that he never named any RSS leader during questioning. The RSS, too, has denied the allegations. After a prolonged trial, Aseemanand was eventually acquitted of all charges.

== Allegations of involvement in bombings ==
Following the arrest and investigation of Abhinav Bharat members Swami Aseemanand, Shrikant Purohit, Sadhvi Pragya Thakur, Lokesh Sharma, Kamal Chauhan, Sunil Joshi, and Rajendra Choudhary in connection with the 2006 Malegaon blasts, the organization has been investigated for its alleged role in 2007 Samjhauta Express bombings, Malegaon blasts, Mecca Masjid bombing, Ajmer Sharif Dargah blast and Jalna mosque bomb attack. In all these bombings, 147 people were killed. Anti-Terrorism Squad Investigations have revealed that serving and retired army officers associated with Abhinav Bharat hijacked the organisation and motivated the youth to take up armed struggle against Muslims. Swapan Dasgupta notes that the group seemed little more "than a letterhead or part of a fantasy world".

Praveen Mutalik, who was arrested for his alleged role in the 2008 Malegaon blasts, is alleged to have received more than ₹3 lakh (US$3,100) from Prasad Shrikant Purohit, a co-founder of the Abhinav Bharat. Furthermore, the Anti Terrorist Squad has claimed that Ajay Rahirkar, the treasurer of Abhinav Bharat, received ₹10 lakh (US$10,000) from various hawaladars.
