= Pragya Singh Thakur =

Indian politician

Member of Parliament, Lok Sabha
- In office 23 May 2019 – 4 June 2024
- Preceded by: Alok Sanjar
- Succeeded by: Alok Sharma
- Constituency: Bhopal, Madhya Pradesh

Personal details
- Born: Pragya Chandrapal Singh Thakur; 2 February 1970 (age 56) Lahar, Bhind, Madhya Pradesh, India
- Party: Bharatiya Janata Party
- Parent(s): Dr. C. P. Singh, Sarla Singh
- Known for: Member of Parliament, and one of the prime accused in 2008 Malegaon blasts

Pragya Singh Thakur (born 2 February 1970; Hindi pronunciation: [pɾəgjaː sɪŋgʱ ʈʰaːkʊɾ]), better known as Sadhvi Pragya (Hindi: [saːd̪ʱ.ʋiː pɾəgjaː]), is an Indian politician and former Member of Parliament who represented Bhopal and belongs to the Bharatiya Janata Party. During her college days, she was an active member of Akhil Bharatiya Vidyarthi Parishad (ABVP) and later joined various affiliate organisations of the Rashtriya Swayamsevak Sangh (RSS).

She was an accused in the 2008 Malegaon bombings where 10 people were killed and 82 more were injured. She was arrested on terror charges after her bike was allegedly found to be used in the bomb blast. She was under trial for multiple charges under the Unlawful Activities (Prevention) Act. In 2017 she was granted bail on health grounds following the dropping of some of the serious charges by the National Investigation Agency.

Thakur contested the 2019 Indian general election from Bhopal constituency, running against Digvijaya Singh of the Indian National Congress, the former Chief Minister of Madhya Pradesh. She won her debut contest by a margin of 364,822 votes.

On 21 November 2019, Thakur was made a part of the 21-member parliamentary consultative committee on defence, which is headed by Defence Minister Rajnath Singh. After her comment in parliament, where she called Nathuram Godse (Gandhi's assassin) a patriot, she was criticised by opposition party members. On 28 November, she was removed from the committee on defence as well as BJP parliamentary party meetings.

== Personal life ==
Thakur was born on 2 February 1970. Her father, Chandrapal Singh, was an Ayurvedic practitioner in Bhind, Madhya Pradesh and a worker of Rashtriya Swayamsevak Sangh. She had been a tomboy since her childhood, keeping her hair short, and dressing like a boy. She was often called 'the girl with boyish looks'. She loved riding bikes. It was a motorcycle registered on her name which led to her arrest in connection with the Malegaon blasts.

=== Cancer treatment ===
Cardiothoracic and vascular surgeon Dr. S. S. Rajput of the Dr. Ram Manohar Lohia Institute of Medical Sciences, Lucknow said that Thakur underwent a bilateral mastectomy to prevent recurrence of her cancer in 2008, stating he had operated on her three times. She had been operated twice to surgically remove both her breasts to cure her breast cancer. She was criticised for saying that her breast cancer got cured because of using cow urine and Panchagavya.

== Political career ==
Thakur studied at Lahar College (Bhind), where, in 1993, she joined Akhil Bhartiya Vidyarthi Parishad (ABVP), the student wing of the Sangh Parivar. She subsequently rose to the position of state secretary and left this organisation in 1997. After that, she worked for Rashtrawadi Sena and the Hindu Jagran Manch. She was also a member of Durga Vahini, women's wing of Hindu organisation Bajrang Dal. She is also a founder member of Vande Mataram Jan Kalyan Samiti, which is an organisation connected to the Rashtriya Swayamsevak Sangh and belongs to the Sangh Parivar.

=== 2019 General Elections ===
Thakur joined the Bharatiya Janata Party on 17 April 2019 and was declared as the BJP candidate for Bhopal Lok Sabha constituency for 2019 elections. Thakur was in the news for saying that Mumbai former ATS chief Hemant Karkare died in 2008 Mumbai attacks because she cursed him for giving her bad treatment in jail after her arrest in 2008 blasts. BJP leader Fatima Rasool Siddique said her communal and obnoxious remarks have tarnished the image of Shivraj Singh Chouhan and Muslims and she will not campaign for Thakur. Election Commission of India directed the police to file an FIR against Thakur for her Babri Masjid remark that she participated in demolition of the Babri Masjid at Ayodhya in 1992. The Election Commission later banned her for 72 hours from campaigning for violating the Model Code of Conduct by stirring up communal feelings. She was later criticised by BJP party leaders for saying that the killer of Mahatma Gandhi, Nathuram Godse was and always will be a patriot. Nevertheless, Thakur won the election by a margin of 364,822 votes defeating opposing candidate Digvijaya Singh, a two-time Chief Minister of Madhya Pradesh.

=== Parliamentary committee on defence ===
On 21 November 2019 Sadhvi Pragya Singh Thakur has been made a part of the 21-member parliamentary consultative committee on defence, which is headed by Defence Minister Rajnath Singh. After her comment in parliament, where she called Nathuram Godse (Gandhi's assassin) a patriot, she was criticised by opposition party members. On 28 November, she was sacked from the committee on defence as well as BJP parliamentary party meetings.

== 2008 Malegaon bombings ==
Following the 2008 Malegaon bombings, in which six people were killed and over 100 injured, Thakur was arrested as one of the prime accused in October 2008 under terrorism charges.

=== Arrest and trial ===
Mumbai's Anti Terrorist Squad (ATS) claimed that Thakur formed a group to take revenge for the 2006 Mumbai train bombings and that her motorcycle was used in the bomb blast. This motorcycle was a key evidence in the arrest of Thakur.

On 19 January 2009, Maharashtra Police filed a 4000-page charge sheet for the Malegaon blasts. According to this charge sheet, Lt Col Prasad Purohit was claimed to be the main conspirator who provided the explosives and Thakur arranged the persons who planted the explosive. It was claimed that on 11 April 2008, Thakur and Purohit met in Bhopal wherein both agreed for co-operation in carrying out the blast. However, the charges framed against the Maharashtra Control of Organised Crime Act were dropped for Thakur in July 2009 because Thakur was not proven to be a member of this organised crime syndicate.

Swami Aseemanand in his on-camera confessions named Thakur as one of the key conspirators in the 2008 Malegaon, Ajmer Dargah, and 2007 Samjhauta Express bombings.

=== Bail pleas ===
Thakur had challenged the Bombay High court order of 12 March 2010 rejecting her plea for bail, contending that her arrest violated the mandate of Article 22(1) and 22(2) of the Constitution and also on the ground that no charge sheet was filed within 90 days as contemplated by Section 167(2) of the Code of Criminal Procedure. She contended that she was arrested by the Maharashtra Police's Anti-Terrorism Squad (ATS) from Surat on 10 October 2008, but was brought before the magistrate on 24 October, and thus was in illegal detention for 14 days which violated Article 22(2). On 23 September 2011, the Supreme Court dismissed the bail plea. Dismissing her plea, the bench of Justice JM Panchal and Justice HL Gokhale said "The appellant's contention that she was arrested on October 10, 2008, and was in police custody since then is found to be factually incorrect by this Court. The appellant was arrested only on October 23, 2008, and within 24 hours thereof, on October 24, 2008, she was produced before the Chief Judicial Magistrate, Nasik. As such, there is no violation of either Article 22(2) of the Constitution or Section 167 of Cr.PC."

In 2012 she also filed an application for bail in the Bombay High Court on health grounds, claiming that she has been diagnosed with third-stage breast cancer. On 9 August 2012, she, however, withdrew her application.

In 2014 she again filed an application for bail in the Bombay High Court which was rejected.

In April 2017, she was granted bail by the Bombay High Court on health grounds, following the dropping of charges in under the MCOCA section by the Special National Investigation Agency. She is currently under trial for multiple charges under the Unlawful Activities (Prevention) Act.

=== Allegations of torture ===
Thakur has made, directly or indirectly, several claims about ill-treatment in prison. In August 2014, the Human Rights Commission ordered a probe into Thakur's allegations of torture while in police custody. Subsequently, the case of torture was closed as the panel did not find any evidence to support these claims.

=== Acquittal ===
On 31 July 2025, after 17 years, seven accused including Thakur were acquitted by the NIA special court.

== Controversies ==
=== Remarks on 26/11 martyr Hemant Karkare (2019) ===
In April 2019, during her election campaign, Thakur made a controversial statement about Hemant Karkare, the Mumbai Anti-Terrorism Squad (ATS) chief who was killed in action during the 2008 Mumbai terror attacks. She alleged that Karkare had falsely implicated her in the 2008 Malegaon blast case and bragged that he "died because she had cursed him". Thakur stated that Karkare had acted against her "dharma" and therefore met a tragic end.

Although several leaders of the Rashtriya Swayamsevak Sangh backed Thakur, her remarks were widely condemned across the political spectrum, with opposition parties, civil society groups, and families of 26/11 victims criticizing her for insulting the memory of a police officer who had sacrificed his life in the line of duty. The Bharatiya Janata Party also distanced itself from her comments, and she later issued an apology, saying her statement was made out of personal anguish.

=== Multiple references to Nathuram Godse as a patriot (2019, 2021, 2023) ===
In May 2019, during her election campaign, Thakur stirred major controversy by referring to Nathuram Godse, who was Mahatma Gandhi's assassin and a former RSS member, as a "deshbhakt" (patriot). Her statement triggered nationwide outrage, including condemnation from opposition leaders, civil society, and even senior members of her own party. Following the widespread criticism, the Bharatiya Janata Party officially distanced itself from her remarks, with Prime Minister Narendra Modi stating that he would never forgive her for the comment. Thakur later issued an apology, but the controversy remained a major blemish on her public image.

During a parliamentary session in November 2019, Thakur once again referred to Godse as a patriot. While some members of the Bharatiya Janata Party defended her statement, the party removed Thakur from the parliamentary consultative committee on defence on 28 November in an attempt to further distance itself from Thakur's comments.

In January 2021, Thakur alluded to Godse as a patriot once again. In response to Congress leader Digvijay Singh's reference to Godse as the "first terrorist", Thakur told reporters in Ujjain that "the Congress has always abused patriots and termed them as saffron terrorists".

In September 2023, Thakur referred to Godse as a patriot for a fourth time in public during an Aaj Tak event in her constituency of Bhopal. While on stage, she referred to the assassination of Mahatma Gandhi as a patriotic step taken by Godse.

=== Remarks on caste (2020) ===
In December 2020, while addressing a gathering of Kshatriya Mahasabha Thakur made a controversial remark. She said that Brahmins don't feel bad when called Brahmin, so do Kshatriyas and Vaishyas. But Shudras do not like to be called as Shudra because of ignorance, they are "unable to understand".

=== Advocacy of Cow Urine as COVID-19 Remedy (2021) ===
During the COVID-19 pandemic in 2021, Thakur made public remarks addressing BJP party workers in Bhopal claiming that drinking cow urine helps infected people heal from the effects of the virus. "I consumed cow urine daily and it is a kind of acid which purifies my body. It also purifies the lungs and saves me from COVID-19 infection. I don’t take any medicine against corona but I am safe." The purported benefits of drinking cow urine have no scientific backing.

=== Comments on the Karnataka Hijab Row (2022) ===
During the 2022 Karnataka hijab row defending the ban on hijab, Thakur said that there is "no need to wear hijab anywhere" and that only those who are "not safe in their houses need to wear Hijab". She also said that there is no need to wear a hijab when in the company of the Hindu community, especially at educational institutions.

=== Support for Nupur Sharma's derogatory remarks about Prophet Muhammad (2022) ===
Thakur publicly expressed her support for BJP spokesperson Nupur Sharma after Sharma’s controversial remarks on Muhammad sparked nationwide protests and international condemnation. Thakur’s endorsement was seen as an attempt to align with hardline views within the party, further fuelling communal tensions.

=== Hate Speech and Call for Violence (2022) ===
In December 2022, while addressing a public gathering in Shivamogga, Karnataka, Thakur made remarks that were widely condemned as hate speech and incitement to violence. She urged Hindus to keep weapons at home and be prepared to respond to what she described as threats from the Muslim community. She stated: "Keep weapons in your homes. If nothing else, keep knives sharpened. At least you will be able to cut vegatables well, but when the time comes, it will be useful against our enemies too."

Her comments drew widespread criticism from opposition leaders and activists, who accused her of promoting communal hatred and encouraging vigilantism. Police complaints were filed against her in multiple states, while human rights organizations called for strict action.

=== Disruption of SpiceJet Flight (2022) ===
In December 2022, Thakur was involved in a controversy aboard a SpiceJet flight from Delhi to Bhopal. Thakur insisted on being provided the emergency exit seat despite being ineligible due to her use of a wheelchair, leading to a heated argument with airline staff. The dispute caused a delay of more than 45 minutes in the flight’s departure. Other passengers expressed frustration over the incident, and videos of the confrontation circulated on social media, drawing criticism of Thakur’s behaviour and misuse of her position as a Member of Parliament.

=== Call for Violence against non-Hindu merchants near Temples (2025) ===
In September 2025, Thakur made a controversial speech at a Vishwa Hindu Parishad (VHP) event in Bhopal in which she urged Hindu devotees to form "monitoring groups" around temples. She specified that if any "Vidharmi" (term referring to non-Hindus) was found selling prasad near temples, they should first be "thrashed black and blue" and then handed over to police. She called for a wider boycott of non-Hindus for odd jobs like driving and electrical work. She also reiterated earlier calls to keep weapons in homes, saying that families should keep sharp tools ready to defend themselves. She reportedly said: "If the enemy crosses the threshold of your home, cut them in half".

== See also ==
- Anti Terrorist Squad (India)
- Saffron terror
