= Makkah Masjid bombing =

Terrorist incident in India

Makkah Masjid bombing Hyderabad (India)
- Location: Hyderabad, Telangana, India17.360106°N 78.473427°E
- Date: 18 May 2007; 13:15 IST ((UTC+5.30))
- Target: Makkah Masjid
- Attack type: Cyclotol activated by cellphone
- Deaths: 16
- Injuries: 100

A bombing occurred on 18 May 2007 inside the Makkah Masjid, a mosque located in the old city area of Hyderabad, capital of the Indian state of Telangana located very close to Charminar. The blast was caused by a cellphone-triggered pipe bomb placed near the site designated for ablution. Two further live IEDs were found and defused by the police.

Sixteen people were reported dead in the immediate aftermath, of whom five were killed by the police firing after the incident while trying to quell the rioting Muslim mob. On 16 April 2018, the NIA Court acquitted all 11 who were accused in the blasts, citing lack of evidence.

== Overview ==
The bomb exploded around 1:15 pm in Mecca Masjid, a 400-year-old mosque in Hyderabad. The IED contained cyclotol, a 60:40 mixture of RDX and TNT, filled in a 10-inch (250 mm) by 3-inch (76 mm) pipe. The bomb was placed under a heavy marble platform, which took the force of the impact and saved many lives. Two more IEDs were found, one 100 meters away from the blast site and the other near the main gate. Both of them were defused 3 hours after the blast.

The blast occurred near the open-air section of the masjid. At the time of the blast more than 10,000 people were inside the mosque premises, for the Friday prayers. The injured were treated at the Osmania hospital in Hyderabad.

== Rioting and Police firing ==
Five individuals from rioting mob died as a result of the police firing, The Telegraph reported:

Six rounds were fired in the afternoon and evening to prevent shops and public property from being damaged, including petrol pumps and ATMs. One person was killed in the firing in the Moghalpura area, while two fell to the police bullets elsewhere. Another lost his life when the police had to pull the trigger to control a mob trying to break into an ATM. According to police commissioner Balwinder Singh, his men resorted to firing after water cannons, tear gas and baton-charge failed to bring the mob fury under control.

It was reported that a frenzied mob attacked state-owned road transport corporation buses, forcing the closure of Falaknuma bus depot. According to the police, the rioters were trying to set fire to a petrol pump. Inspector P. Sudhakar of Falaknuma police station, who has been removed from his position on the charge of opening fire 'indiscriminately' to control the rampaging mobs stated: "While I asked my subordinates to be on high alert, mobs from Shalibanda and the mosque came towards Moghalpura pelting stones. They set ablaze a wine shop and charged towards a petrol pump where we were stationed."

The mobs took out petrol from the dispenser and sprinkled it on the room. "When they tried to ignite it with the help of dry grass, I ordered my men to open fire with .303 rifles to disperse them ... As the situation turned worse, I sought additional forces. Quick Reaction teams along with Moghalpura Inspector arrived and scattered the crowd by opening fire", Sudhakar said. At least 10 persons, including policemen, could have been killed had fire orders were not issued, he added.

== Investigation ==
After the bombing, two police cases were opened at the Hussaini Alam Police Station, one for the exploded bomb and one for the unexploded bomb. On 9 June 2007, the former was transferred to the Central Bureau of Investigation.

=== Early suspects and theories ===
On 15 June 2007, the Special investigation Team (SIT) of Hyderabad Police initially arrested a 27-year-old air conditioner mechanic as a suspect in the bombing, and on 15 July, a 26-year-old worker at a watch repair shop was also arrested. In August 2007, one of the two suspects was shot dead by unknown gunmen in Karachi. On 3 December 2008, a third suspect was arrested.

In August 2010, security analyst Bahukutumbi Raman questioned "the two different versions that have emerged from Indian and American investigators."

In September 2010, it was reported that the National Counterterrorism Center (NCTC) had thought that Harkat-ul-Jihad al-Islami (HuJI) could have been behind the attacks based on initial investigations, before the Central Bureau of Investigation took over the case. The CBI claimed that the NCTC was not "up to date with the latest investigation", after the NCTC director claimed HuJI as the perpetrators in a 2010 document to the United States Senate.

=== Main investigation ===
On 19 November 2010, the CBI produced the preacher Swami Aseemanand before the court in connection with the Makkah Masjid blast in Hyderabad in May 2007. On 18 December, he confessed in front of a magistrate, citing the guilt he felt after seeing innocent Muslim boys arrested in the case by the police. The confession of Aseemanand, together with transcripts of meetings between the preacher, Sadhvi Pragya, senior military officers and others implicated Abhinav Bharat in the bombing, alongside a role in Malegaon, Samjhauta Express and Ajmer Dargah bombings. The case "revealed for the first time conclusive evidence of "Hindutva terror"," and took the investigation in a new direction.

The Anti Terrorist Squad (India) (ATS) and CBI subsequently questioned former members of the RSS, and in December 2010 charged Aseemanand as the mastermind behind the Makkah Masjid bombing.

In early January 2011, a letter written by Aseemanand on 20 December 2010, two days after his confession to the CBI, was revealed. The letter, which was never sent, was addressed to the presidents of India and Pakistan and explained why he had wanted to confess and tell the truth after seeing the innocent people that had been arrested and implicated with him. The letter confession of the prompted families of the 32 men arrested in the aftermath of the bombing demanded the release of the youths from jail. On 15 January, the full court confession was published by Tehelka and CNN-IBN.

=== Forced confession complaint ===
In late March 2011, Aseemanand attempted to withdraw his 'confession', claiming that he had been coerced by the ATS, and submitted a letter to the court which said: "I have been pressured mentally and physically by the investigating agencies to 'confess' that I was behind these blasts." He also said he was threatened and pressured to become a government witness in the case.

== Court hearings and verdict ==
The NIA began the probe in April 2011 after the initial investigations by the local police and the chargesheet filed by the CBI. 226 witnesses were examined during the trial and about 411 documents exhibited. The verdict was pronounced by a special NIA court acquitting all the accused due to lack of evidence. Special NIA judge Ravindra Reddy resigned after the verdict.

== Aftermath ==
In late 2011, Aseemanand wrote a petition to President of India Pratibha Patil describing torture allegedly meted out to him during his confinement, prompting the Punjab and Haryana high courts to issue a notice to the National Investigation Agency to investigate the allegations of torture.

In January 2013, then-Indian Home Minister Sushilkumar Shinde, of Indian National Congress, accused Rashtriya Swayamsevak Sangh and Bharatiya Janata Party for setting up camps to train terrorists, and alleged involvement in planting bombs in the 2007 Samjhauta Express bombings, Mecca Masjid blast and 2006 Malegaon blasts. Rashtriya Swayamsevak Sangh spokesperson Ram Madhav responded to this allegation by accusing Shinde of pandering to Islamist groups like Jamaat-ud-Dawah and Lashkar-e-Taiba. In February 2013, after BJP threatened to boycott the parliament during the Budget session, Shinde apologised for his remarks and said that he had no intention to link terror to any religion and that there was no basis for suggesting that terror can be linked to organisations mentioned in his earlier speech.

In September 2013, Yasin Bhatkal confessed that Indian Mujahideen had bombed two other places in Hyderabad later in August 2007 to avenge Makkah Masjid blast which was then allegedly attributed to Hindu fundamental groups.

== See also ==
- Religious violence in India
- 2006 Malegaon blasts
- 2007 Samjhauta Express bombings
- 2007 Ajmer Dargah bombing
- 2008 Western India bombings
