= Jyotirmaya Sharma =

Indian intellectual

Jyotirmaya Sharma is a professor of political science at the Department of Political Science and, served as the Dean of School of Social Sciences, at the University of Hyderabad, Telangana, in India. He was a Senior Fellow at the Lichtenberg-Kolleg, Germany, between 2019-2021. Between September 2015 and June 2016, he was a visiting fellow at the Institute for Human Sciences, Vienna, Austria. Earlier, between January–June 2012, he was a Fellow at the Swedish Collegium for Advanced Study and Fellow of the Lichtenberg-Kolleg at the Georg-August-Universität in Göttingen, Germany, in 2012–13. He was also a member of the Scientific Advisory Council of the French Network of Institutes for Advanced Study, RFIEA between 2013 and 2016. In January 2015, he was appointed member of the scientific advisory board of the Lichtenberg-Kolleg, Göttingen. He has been a fellow of the Centre for the Study of Developing Societies and the Indian Institute of Advanced Study, and has lectured at the universities of Baroda, Hull, Oxford, and the St. Stephens College, Delhi. He was visiting professor in democratic theory at the South Asia Institute at Ruprecht-Karls University at Heidelberg in 2005. The International House, Japan, awarded him the Asia Leadership Fellow Programme fellowship for 2008. Sharma also held senior editorial positions at the Times of India and The Hindu between 1998 and 2006.

== Publications ==
His recent publications include, Elusive Non-Violence: The Making and Unmaking of Gandhi's Religion of Ahimsa, Context, 2021, The Ocean of Mirth: Reading Hāsyārṇava-Prahasanaṁ of Jagadēśvara Bhaṭṭāchārya, A Political Satire for All Times, Translated with an Introduction by Jyotirmaya Sharma, Routledge, Abingdon, New York & New Delhi, 2020, Cosmic Love and Human Apathy: Swami Vivekananda and the Restatement of Religion, HarperCollins, New Delhi, 2013, A Restatement of Religion: Swami Vivekananda and the Making of Hindu Nationalism, Yale University Press, New Haven & London, 2013, Hindutva: Exploring the Idea of Hindu Nationalism (HarperCollins, 2015); this book has been translated in Indian languages) and Terrifying Vision: M.S. Golwalkar, the RSS and India (Penguin/Viking, 2007; this book has been translated into Malayalam).

An edited volume titled Grounding Morality: Freedom, Knowledge and the Plurality of Cultures (co-edited with A. Raghuramaraju) was published by Routledge (2010).

== Books ==
- Elusive Non-Violence: The Making and Unmaking of Gandhi's Religion of Ahimsa, Context, 2021
- Terrifying vision : M.S. Golwalkar, the RSS, and India, Penguin, 2007. Later reprinted as M.S. Golwakar, the RSS and India, Context, 2019.
- Grounding morality : freedom, knowledge and the plurality of cultures, Routledge, 2012 (reed. 2016). Co-edited with A. Raghuramaraju.
- A restatement of religion : Swami Vivekananda and the making of Hindu nationalism, Context, 2013 (reed. 2019).
- Hindutva : exploring the idea of Hindu nationalism, HarperCollins Publishers India, 2015.
- The ocean of mirth : reading Hāsyārṇava-Prahasanaṁ of Jagadēśvara Bhaṭṭāchārya : a political satire for all times, Routledge, 2019. English translation and analytical interpretation of a medieval Sanskrit text.
