= P. S. Pasricha =

Indian police officer

- Born: Parvinder Singh Pasricha
- Education: Ph.D. in infrastructural and logistical management
- Occupation: Director General of Police of Maharashtra state.
- Employer: Indian Police

Parvinder Singh Pasricha is an Indian police officer, who served as the 30th police commissioner of the Mumbai Police, and as the Director General of Police of Maharashtra state.

== Biography ==
P. S. Pasricha, has a doctorate in infrastructural and logistical administration and management. Date of birth of Mr. P. S. Pasricha is 11 November.

=== Career ===
P. S. Pasricha is a retired 1970 batch IPS officer. In 1974, he served as additional Superintendent of Police (crime) in Thane, where took stringent action against smugglers and feared criminals. He also worked as a superintendent of police in Kulaba, Nashik and Amravati districts. His handling of communal riots in Amravati was appreciated by the Maharashtra State government.

Pasricha was the deputy commissioner of Mumbai traffic police in the 1980s, when he introduced several schemes to improve traffic management in Mumbai. He was awarded the Shanti Doot International Award - the honour for Indians conferred by the World Peace Movement India. He also authored a book on road safety and traffic management. Pasricha served as the zonal Deputy Commissioner of Police (DCP), the DCP of preventive wing and armed police in Mumbai, joint commissioner (law and order), the additional DG (training), and commissioner of the Maharashtra state intelligence. He also served in the state CID (crime), anti-corruption bureau, Maharashtra Police Academy and the police computer wing.

Pasricha played a major role in restoring the confidence of Muslims and various communities following the 1992-93 Mumbai riots. He was conferred with the President's police medal for distinguished service, and the Indian police medal for meritorious service.

Pasricha took over as the 30th police commissioner of the Mumbai police in November 2003. Pasricha thus became the second Sikh officer to head the Mumbai police force, the first being A. S. Samra. He succeeded R. S. Sharma, who went on leave after being questioned by a police team probing a counterfeit stamp paper racket.

On 3 February 2004, Pasricha was transferred to the post of Director General of Police and managing director of the Maharashtra State Police Welfare and Housing Corporation. He was replaced by A N Roy.

=== Personal life ===
Pasricha's family comprises his wife, a son, and a daughter.
