= Tasneem Aslam =

Pakistani career diplomat

Tasneem Aslam (Urdu: تسنیم اسلم) was a Pakistani career diplomat who formerly served as the spokesperson of Ministry of Foreign Affairs. Tanseem Aslam is the strongest name for the President of Azad Kashmir, sources are saying.

== Career ==
After joining the Foreign Service of Pakistan in 1984, she served in missions in New Delhi, The Hague and Paris before serving as ambassador to Italy between 2007-2010 and to the Kingdom of Morocco in 2012. She served as the Additional Foreign Secretary for European Affairs from August 2013 till December 2013.

Aslam's alma maters include the University of the Punjab, where she received a Master in Business Administration, and The Fletcher School of Law and Diplomacy at Tufts University, where she was awarded a master's degree in International Relations.

In an article examining the progress of female diplomats, Pakistan Today stated that Aslem is the only woman from Azad Kashmir. She was the first woman appointed by the ministry as its spokesperson (in 2005). She served as director of the Foreign Secretary's Office; director Americas; director-general at the United Nations division and the Organisation of Islamic Cooperation.

She retired form the service in 2017.
