= August 2007 Hyderabad bombings =

List of 2007 bombings in Hyderabad

2007 Hyderabad Bombings
- Location: Hyderabad, India, 17.360106°N 78.473427°E
- Date: 25 August 2007; 19:45 and 19:50 (IST (UTC+5.30))
- Target: Lumbini Park (lazer show), and Gokul Chat Bhandar, Koti
- Attack type: Bombing
- Weapons: Improvised explosive devices made with Ammonium nitrate, Neogel-90
- Deaths: 42
- Injuries: 54

The Hyderabad bombings refers to the incident in which two bombs exploded almost simultaneously on 25 August 2007 in Hyderabad, capital of the Indian state of Andhra Pradesh (now Telangana). The first bomb exploded in Lumbini Amusement Park (17°24′35″N 78°28′23.5″E) at 19:45 hrs IST. The second bomb exploded five minutes later at 19:50 in Gokul Chat Bhandar (17°23′6″N 78°29′8″E) in Koti, a popular restaurant about 5 kilometres (3 mi) away. At least 42 people were reported to have died in the two bombings. Two more bombs were defused in other parts of the city. According to initial reports, the banned Harkat-ul-Jihad-al-Islami militant outfit of Bangladesh is suspected for the serial blasts.

== Unexploded bombs ==
A day after the blasts, police discovered 19 unexploded bombs—most fitted with timers and placed in plastic bags—across Hyderabad at bus stops, by cinemas, road junctions and pedestrian bridges and near a public water fountain.

== Victims ==
Police Commissioner of Hyderabad, Mr. Balwinder Singh, mentioned to the Press Trust of India that at least 42 people were dead and at least 54 were injured in the two attacks.

Since the blasts occurred at places popular among the general public on weekends, the victims of the blasts include people from different backgrounds and include several children and women. Among the victims were seven students from Amrutvahini College of Engineering Sangamner (affiliated to University of Pune) in Ahmednagar District in Maharashtra. A group of 45 students, who were visiting Hyderabad on a routine industrial tour, were enjoying a laser show at Lumbini Park when the auditorium was struck by the explosion. The group was accompanied by four faculty members. Bodies of five of the students arrived at the Pune airport on 26 August afternoon and were received at the airport by a large crowd.

== Responsibility ==
Central security agencies said that the banned Harkat-ul-Jehadi Islami (Huji) militant outfit from Bangladesh was possibly behind the twin blasts. It was suspected that Shahid and Bilal or Sahid Ilyas Bilal, who were the masterminds of the Mecca masjid blast were also behind Saturday's explosion. Shahid is reported to be in Karachi, Pakistan, and is instrumental in recruiting people for arms training from Hyderabad. Shahid Ilyas Bilal, who is also linked to the Mecca Masjid attacks is a high-ranking Lashkar-e-Taiba operative who has lately been working with Huji.

Madhukar Gupta, Union Home Secretary, has said that security agencies and state police suspect Lashkar-e-Toiba or Jaish-e-Mohammed. Shivraj Patil Minister for Home Affairs, specified terror groups based in Pakistan and Bangladesh were involved in the attacks.

On 26 August, Foreign Affairs Adviser of Bangladesh Iftekhar Ahmed Chowdhury described claims linking Bangladesh with the bombings as 'baseless'.

On 27 August, the Hyderabad police released the news that the bombs were constructed from Neogel-90, an ammonium nitrate-based explosive used commercially in road construction. The Telegraph reported that this caused suspicion to be 'divided' between the Huji, which is known to have used Neogel in the past, and Naxalite organisations from the interior of Andhra Pradesh, who have been "planning retaliation for the state government's hot-pursuit campaign"; Neogel-90 has not previously been used illegally in India, but has been seized in the past from Naxalite groups in Kerala and Nepal.

== Investigations ==
Three people were picked up for questioning regarding the blast. Among them were a cycle shop owner, from Bibinagar, about 25 kilometres (16 mi) from Hyderabad. It is alleged that he supplied the steel balls used in the bombs.

A group of four individuals was taken for questioning, the Pioneer notes:

The police had caught the four-member gang including a Dubai national on Saturday and the same evening bombs had exploded in two busy public places in the city. The police have recovered fake currency worth Rs 23.6 million. The commissioner said the fake currency notes in the denominations of Rs 500 and Rs 1000 were brought from Pakistan via Dubai. When asked whether the terrorist elements involved in the blasts had used this money, he said the police were looking into the possibility.

== Post-bombings ==
President Pratibha Patil, Vice-President Hamid Ansari and Prime Minister Manmohan Singh condemned the Hyderabad blasts and expressed shock over the loss of innocent lives.

In light of the twin bomb blasts in Hyderabad, forensic scientist P. Chandra Sekharan urged the Government of India to establish a "National Explosives Control Bureau (NECB)" on the lines of the Narcotics Control Bureau.

== Reactions ==
Such vicious attacks prove that cities like Hyderabad and Bangalore, emerging icons of a vibrant nation, are firmly in the cross-hairs of terror groups which have made India a country with perhaps the highest number of civilian victims of terror (besides war-torn countries like Iraq). – Times of India.
