= Swami Aseemanand =

Indian Hindu nationalist, terror accused

- Born: Naba Kumar Sarkar; Kamarpukar, Hooghly district, West Bengal, India
- Other names: Jiten Chatterje, Omkarnath
- Parents: Bibhutibhushan Sarkar (father); Pramila Sarkar (mother)

Swami Aseemanand (born Naba Kumar Sarkar) is a self-proclaimed monk and a former Rashtriya Swayamsevak Sangh activist who was accused in the Ajmer Dargah bombing, Mecca Masjid blast, and the 2007 Samjhauta Express bombings— before being acquitted of all charges.

Aseemanand hailed from West Bengal and was a post-graduate in botany. He was inducted into Rashtriya Swayamsevak Sangh, a Hindu organisation, and then joined Vanavasi Kalyan Ashram.

After being arrested by the Central Bureau of Investigation, on cues from a primary suspect he recorded a confession, in which he admitted to committing the attacks. He was subsequently charged by the NIA; Aseemanand alleged custodial pressure behind the confessions and rejected any involvement. NIA Special court accepted his claim, and went on to rule that the prosecutors had failed to prove their case, otherwise.

In February 2014, a controversy erupted over interviews given by Swami Aseemanand to an advocate-reporter of The Caravan magazine while in Ambala Central Jail. Aseemanand claimed the contents of the interview to be faked which were based on a sting-operation and threatened legal action; the magazine rejected the charges and released transcripts alleged to be of the interviews.

== Early life ==
Aseemanand was born Naba Kumar Sarkar in Kamarpukar located in the Hooghly district of West Bengal. (Over time he also used the aliases Jiten Chatterjee and Omkarnath.) His father was Bibhutibhushan Sarkar, a noted freedom fighter, and his mother is Pramila Sarkar. He is one of seven brothers.

His name Aseemanand was courtesy his guru, Swami Parmanand, in whose ashram in Bangramanjeshwar of Bardhaman Aseemanand stayed till 1988.

== Activities in the Dangs district ==
In 1993, he came to the headquarters of VKA in Jaspurnagar in Chhattisgarh. After two years, Aseemanand was sent to Dangs district of Gujarat to work with tribals in the area. Local tribals told him that Shabari, from the Ramayana, had lived in their forests, which influenced Swami Aseemanand to build a Shabari temple there. He was quite popular among Dang tribals. When Vanavasi Kalyan Ashram shunted him out of Dang over some controversy, the tribals refused to cooperate and he had to be brought back to placate them. "We demolished thirty churches and built temples. There was some commotion."

=== Forcible conversion of Christians ===
Human Rights Watch reported that Aseemanand played a huge role in the 1998 attacks on Christians in southeastern Gujarat, where dozens of churches were burnt down or damaged. The Human rights watch also credited him with the "Unai hot springs conversion ritual" whereby Christian tribals in the district were taken to Asheemanand's ashram and then to the hot springs in Unai, where they were made to forcibly convert to Hinduism. The fieldwork of this conversion ritual was mostly done by the Hindu Jagran Manch. The tribals were animists before their conversion to Christianity. During an interview he claimed to have converted more than 40,000 people to Hinduism and demolished 30 churches in Dang district.

The RSS mouthpiece Organiser described him as "hero of the Dangs".

== Allegations, arrest and acquittal ==
Rajasthan's anti-terrorist squad (ATS) arrested Devendra Gupta on 29 April in connection with 2007 Ajmer Dargah bombing. During the course of his interrogation, Gupta allegedly mentioned that it was Aseemanand and Sunil Joshi who had brought him into their fold and persuaded him to carry out the attacks on Ajmer Sharif and Mecca Masjid. Rajasthan ATS was led to track Aseemanand and he was arrested by the Central Bureau of Investigation (CBI) on 19 November 2010 from an ashram in Haridwar in Uttarakhand for his alleged involvement in the Ajmer Sharief, Mecca Masjid and Samjhauta Express blasts. He was charged in June 2011 by NIA for planning the blast. He was conditionally granted bail in 2015 in the blast case. After a prolonged trial Swami Assemanand was acquitted in Ajmer dargah and Mecca Masjid blast cases by NIA Special Courts in March 2017 and April 2018.

On 20 March 2019, a NIA Special court acquitted all four accused including Swami Aseemanand in Samjhauta Express Blast case. "The NIA Special Court has concluded that the investigating agency has failed to prove the conspiracy charge and ruled that accused deserve a benefit of doubt", NIA Counsel RK Handa said.
