= 2008 Western India bombings =

Terror attacks in the states of Gujarat and Maharashtra

2008 western India bombings
- Date: 29 September 2008
- Location: India
- Motive: Terrorism
- Target: Locals
- Perpetrator: SIMI
- Deaths: 6
- Injuries: 101

On 29 September 2008 three bombs exploded in the states of Gujarat and Maharashtra of India killing 6 people and injuring over 100. Two bombs went off in Malegaon, Maharashtra, which killed nine people while another blast in Modasa, Gujarat resulted in the death of one person.

National Investigation Agency initially accused 7 people, including former BJP MP Pragya Singh Thakur, and demanded punishment under UAPA. However after later investigation, NIA acquitted all the suspects due to lack of evidence.

== Background ==
India witnessed a surge in terror attacks since May 2008, when a series of blasts in Jaipur killed 63. Since then, other major Indian cities including Bangalore, Ahmedabad and Delhi were targeted. On 29 September 2008, police in Ahmedabad, Gujarat foiled another terror attack when 17 bombs were found and defused. However, a bomb exploded at a market packed with Muslims breaking their Ramadan fast, killing one and wounding 15.

Another bomb placed near a Temple in Faridabad was found and defused. Furthermore, the bombs were purportedly similar to those that exploded in Delhi two days before this attack.

The explosions in Malegaon and Modasa occurred on the eve of Navratri, a major Hindu festival celebrated across India.

== Blast ==
The Malegaon blast occurred near a hotel at Bhikku Chowk, Maharashtra. The bombs were allegedly fitted onto a Hero Honda motorcycle and rigged to detonate.

The Modasa blasts, resulting in the death of a 15-year-old boy as well as injuries to several others, was the result of a motorcycle bomb that detonated near a mosque at the Muslim-dominated Sukka Bazaar. The incident took place around 21:26 when special Ramadan prayers (tarawih) were being offered inside the mosque.

=== Aftermath ===
IBN reported that after the blast a mob of 20,000 Muslims gathered near the blast site, following which the state of Maharashtra deployed the Reserve Police Force to prevent any mob violence. The police brought the situation under control after a brief clash with the mob. Gujarat announced plans to deploy police in heavy numbers during the garba festivities.

== Investigation ==
Mumbai Police deployed Anti Terrorism Squad to assist the local investigating authorities in Malegaon. Police say that unsophisticated, crude bombs, identical to those that detonated in Delhi 3 days before, were used. The investigation was led by Mumbai Anti Terrorism Squad chief Hemant Karkare, who was later killed in the 2008 Mumbai attacks.

Police across India, especially in Delhi, received a number of hoax calls and SMSes, hampering the investigation. On 5 October, police said they had arrested a man in connection to the bombings. Press Trust of India reported that further investigations were under way, with more arrests expected.

== Malegaon blasts ==
=== Modasa blasts ===
Union Textiles Minister, Shankersinh Vaghela, came out with an allegedly scathing attack on the Gujarat government by saying it was not willing to nab the "real" culprits behind the blast even though the Congress MP from Sabarkantha, Madhusudan Mistry, had pointed a finger at probable suspects. He made the claim that the Gujarat Police had proved itself "useless" while it was heavily politicised in acting only on the orders issued by the Chief Minister's Office. He based this on the lack of arrests in Modesa, Gujarat, while Maharashtra police had already made arrests in the Malegaon case. With the connection to Hindu suspects in Malegaon, he said he too suspected a similar hand in these blasts. He further alleged, "This proves that terror knows no religion and that it was a matter of concern that so far it was only one-sided trend of targeting one community for suspicion and questioning."

In Gujarat, the Deputy Superintendent of Police, K.K. Mysorewala, who is heading the probe into the attack, said: "We have summoned some active ABVP members to record their statements to take our probe forward." He, however, refused to name those who have been summoned and the reason behind doing so. The Sabarkantha police have recorded statements from about 500-odd people until 28 October 2008. On 31 October, he exonerated the Malegoan accused from involvement in the Gujarat blasts. He said, "We have interrogated all the five who are currently in the custody of Mumbai police in connection with the Malegaon blast. None of them, however, are involved in the Modasa blast."

On 7 November, it was reported that clues may be emerging. The origin of a readymade Printed Circuit Board (PCB) used in the timer circuit of the bomb may yield greater clues and lead to arrests. Unlike assembled PCBs, the manufacture of a readymade PCB can be tracked with the help of its specific manufacturing design and serial number. Experts in the Physics Department of the Directorate of Forensic Sciences (DFS) in the Gujarat capital of Gandhinagar say the readymade PCB consists of two Philips Integrated Circuits (ICs), and some capacitors and resistors mounted on a circuit board in a particular order.

An expert involved with the case said that as a result of such moves "We have short-listed the names of some companies that manufacture PCBs of these types. The list had also been handed over to the Sabarkantha police and they are trying to track the final recipient of the PCB under examination. Though this can be a difficult task, it is not impossible."

== See also ==
- List of terrorist incidents in 2008
- Saffron terror
