= 2007 Samjhauta Express bombings =

2007 terrorist attack on a train, Panipat, India

Coordinates: 29°18′35″N 76°58′59″E

Samjhauta Express bombing
- Location: Diwana, Panipat, Haryana, India
- Date: 18 February 2007; 23:53 (UTC +5:30)
- Target: Samjhauta Express train
- Weapon: Bombs
- Deaths: 70
- Injuries: 50
- Accused: Lashkar-e-Taiba; Abhinav Bharat

The 2007 Samjhauta Express bombings was a terrorist attack that occurred around midnight on 18 February 2007 on the Samjhauta Express, a twice-weekly train service connecting Delhi, India, and Lahore, Pakistan. Bombs were set off in two carriages, both filled with passengers, just after the train passed Diwana near the Indian city of Panipat, 80 kilometres (50 mi) north of New Delhi. 70 people were killed in the ensuing fire and dozens more were injured. Of the 70 fatalities, most were Pakistani civilians. The victims also included some Indian civilians and three railway policemen.

Investigators subsequently found evidence of suitcases with explosives and flammable material, including three undetonated bombs. Inside one of the undetonated suitcases, a digital timer encased in transparent plastic was packed alongside a dozen plastic bottles containing fuel oils and chemicals. After the bombing, eight unaffected carriages were allowed to continue onwards to Lahore with passengers. Both the Indian and Pakistani governments condemned the attack, and officials on both sides speculated that the perpetrators intended to disrupt improving relations between the two nations, since the attack came just a day before Pakistani Foreign Minister Khurshid Mahmud Kasuri was to arrive in New Delhi to resume peace talks with Indian leaders.

India's National Investigation Agency (NIA) charged eight people in the terrorist attack, including Swami Aseemanand, a Hindu cleric formerly affiliated with the Rashtriya Swayamsevak Sangh. While Aseemanand was released on bail, three persons charged in the case are absconding, and three others are in prison. The alleged mastermind, Sunil Joshi, was killed in 2007. In 2019, an NIA court acquitted all the accused.

It has been allegedly linked to Abhinav Bharat, a Hindu fundamentalist group in India. Allegations were also concurred on Lashkar-e-Taiba (LeT), an Islamic fundamentalist terror group in Pakistan. A United States report declared Arif Qasmani to be involved in the attack. Consequently, he was designated as a Specially Designated Global Terrorist by the United States and designated by the Al-Qaida and Taliban Sanctions Committee of the United Nations Security Council for facilitating the LeT in "the July 2006 train bombing in Mumbai, India, and the February 2007 Samjota Express bombing in Panipat, India."

Questions were raised over a Pakistani national who was arrested after the bombings for not carrying valid papers and was seen as suspicious by the investigators, but was discharged within 14 days according to a statement of the first investigation officer assigned to the case. A court order had noted the statement of the police that no proof had been found against him, which was also stated later by one of the senior officers.

A narco-analysis test was conducted on SIMI's leaders Safdar Nagori, Kamruddin Nagori and Amil Parvez who had stated about Abdul Razzaq's involvement in the blasts and him informing Safdar about it. Times Now had broadcast a video of the test in 2017. The later statements of Swami Aseemanand of Sunil Joshi telling him of involvement of his men in the blast had caused confusion for the investigators. One of the investigating officers stated in 2016 that they had investigated the Islamists including Safdar but didn't find them involved. Razzaq who had been in prison since 2005 had been interrogated and had brought Qasmani to the notice of Intelligence Bureau as a key Lashkar financier. He was questioned regarding the case, but no evidence of his involvement were found. Some officers had also questioned the reliability of narco-analysis.

== Background ==
Since their formation resulting from the Partition of India in 1947, India and Pakistan have had a conflict-ridden relationship. In their plan for the partition, the British allowed all 565 princely states to decide which country they wanted to join. Most Hindu-majority princely states acceded to the Republic of India, while most Muslim-majority princely states joined the Dominion (now Islamic Republic) of Pakistan. The decision made by the leaders of some of these princely states has been a source of conflict and tension between the two countries. Kashmir is one of these princely states—its population was mostly Muslim, but the Hindu ruler Hari Singh of the state decided to join India. The countries have fought four wars over this disputed region: the Indo-Pakistani War of 1947, the Indo-Pakistani War of 1965, the Indo-Pakistani War of 1971 (resulting in the formation of Bangladesh), and the Kargil War in 1999.

Since the 1980s, militants in Jammu and Kashmir have targeted attacks on civilians, members of the government and the Indian Army. Some groups, like the Islamist militant organisations Lashkar-e-Taiba and Jaish-e-Mohammed, believe that Kashmir should be integrated into Pakistan, while others—such as the Jammu Kashmir Liberation Front—believe it should become an independent state. All told, thousands of civilians have died due to the insurgency.

In recent years, the Indian and Pakistani governments have made attempts to bring peace or at least calm tensions between the countries. One such attempt in the peace process came with the launch of the Samjhauta Express, so-named because the word samjhauta means "accord" and "compromise" in Hindi and Urdu, respectively. This twice-weekly train service runs between Delhi and Attari in India and Wagah and Lahore in Pakistan. Launched in 1976, the Samjhauta Express served as the only rail connection between the two countries until the launch of the Thar Express. Given the nature of the transnational service and the ongoing violence in the region, the Samjhauta Express was always heavily guarded, as it was a high-risk target for terrorist attacks. Weeks after the Indian Parliament terrorist attack on 13 December 2001, the train service was discontinued amid security concerns. Although it resumed service on 15 January 2004, the train was placed on high security. Just days before the attack, Pakistani Foreign Minister Khurshid Mahmud Kasuri announced that he was going to Delhi on 21 February 2007 to meet with Indian government officials to continue peace talks and to sign a nuclear risk reduction agreement.

== Details ==
Location of Panipat within the state of Haryana

Twin blasts shook two coaches of the Samjhauta Express travelling between India and Pakistan at around 23:53 IST (18:23 UTC) on Sunday, 18 February 2007, shortly after the train had passed through the railway station in the village of Diwana, near the Indian city of Panipat. One railway employee manning the level crossing at the time stated:

It was about 11.52 when I showed the signal lantern to the Attari [Samjhauta] Express which was coming in very fast, probably at over 100 kilometers an hour (62.1 mph). Just as [it] reached near the home signal, I could hear two loud explosions from the coaches near the guards' van at the rear.

After the explosions, both carriages were engulfed in flames and many passengers were incapacitated by the smoke. Witnesses claim to have seen passengers screaming and attempting to escape, but since most of the train's windows were barred for security reasons, many could not escape in time. The injured were pulled out of the burning carriages by fellow passengers and local residents.

== Victims ==
The attack left 68 people dead (43 Pakistan citizens, 10 Indian citizens and 15 unidentified) and 50 injured. Initial identification of the victims was hindered by the fact that many of the bodies were charred beyond recognition. The rest of the train, which was left undamaged by the attack, continued on to the border town of Attari. There, passengers were transferred to a Pakistani train which took them to their destination in Lahore.

== Aftermath ==
On 23 February, a Pakistani Air Force C-130 plane landed, upon being granted approval, in New Delhi to evacuate Pakistanis injured in the train bombing. Of the 10 people to be evacuated, three were missing, all from the same family. Pakistan's Foreign Office spokesperson, Tasneem Aslam, claimed that the father, Rana Shaukat Ali, was harassed by Indian intelligence agency personnel at the Safdarjung Hospital. Aslam also said that Pakistan High Commission officials were denied entrance into the hospital. An Indian External Affairs Ministry spokesperson, Navtej Sarna, denied these allegations and stated that the patients would be taken to the airport. Sarna told the press that Ali's family was not missing, and that hospital doctors had decided not to allow Pakistani officials access into the hospital. He also stated that the C-130 plane had developed a problem and could not take off. Later, Aslam told press correspondents that the "[C-130] aircraft was still at the airport" and that Mr. Ali had chosen to travel back to Pakistan via a land route.

Despite the tensions between the two countries' External Affairs ministries, the C-130 aircraft took off from New Delhi at around 21:00 local time. After the incident, Ali criticised the media, who asked him for "stories for their publications at a time when I am not in my senses because of the death of my five children." He also stated that Indian officials showed him sketches of suspects, but he could not identify them.

Meanwhile, the Indian and Pakistan governments agreed to a bilateral pact to extend passenger train and freight services between the two countries until 2010. In late April, the Indian and Pakistan governments initiated steps for safety and security measures for the Samjhauta Express. The two countries started sharing information on passengers travelling on the trains. The train is now under a reservation system, and as one Railway Ministry source said, "[w]ith no unreserved coaches, we now have complete passenger details from their ticket reservation data a few hours prior to their boarding, and departure of the train." Also in late April, three new coaches equipped with India's most advanced fire fighting systems were added to the Samjhauta Express. Indian Railway Ministry sources commented that the system acts with brake pressure, and this glass-encased system could throw water up to 15 metres (49 ft).

== Investigation ==
The day after the bombing, Indian police stated that the suitcase bomb attack was the work of at least four or five people with a possible militant connection. The police also released sketches of two suspects who the police Inspector General said had left the train just 15 minutes before the explosions. The police say that one of the men was around 35 or 36 years old, "plumpish" and dark, with a moustache, and the second was around 26 or 27, wearing a scarf wrapped around his head. The police stated that both men were speaking Hindi. Another man, a Pakistani national who was drunk at the time, was being questioned because he said he threw one of the bomb-containing suitcases off the train. A senior Haryana state railway police official said that the man's "account has been inconsistent and we have no definite conclusions yet." Later, the Inspector General said "the suitcase was thrown on the track" and that the Pakistani national "was there and said he had thrown it."

In early March, Haryana police arrested two people from the city of Indore who allegedly sold the suitcases used in the bombing. No charges were pressed on the individuals. A probe conducted by the commissioner of Railway Safety officially determined that the explosions and fire on the Samjhauta Express had been caused by bombs located in the upper compartments in coaches GS 03431 and GS 14857. The probe also showed that the train slowed to a speed of 20 kilometres per hour (12 mph) just before it was going to pass the Diwana train station. The results strengthened the belief that the suspects got off the train before the explosions. On 31 March, a 25-year-old man was interrogated after being arrested in Amritsar after jumping off a moving train under suspicious circumstances.

In November 2008, it was reported that Indian officials suspected the attacks were linked to Lt. Col. Prasad Shrikant Purohit, an Indian army officer also alleged member of Hindu nationalist group Abhinav Bharat. Purohit himself claimed that he had "infiltrated" the Abhinav Bharat and he was only doing his job. During an army's Court of Inquiry as many as 59 witnesses stated to the court that Purohit was doing his job (of gathering intelligence inputs) by infiltrating extremist organizations. Officers have testified that he was doing what he was asked to do as a military intelligence man.

Investigators concluded that the suitcases used to make the suitcase bombs originated from Indore in India, based on their stitching. Indian officials said they were prepared to share their findings with Pakistan.

In January 2010, Pakistan Interior Minister Rehman Malik accused India of not pursuing the case seriously, and of refusing to divulge details about the role of Lieutenant Colonel Shrikant Purohit. Malik alleged that Purohit had hired Pakistani extremists to carry out the bombing. In October 2010, an 806-page chargesheet prepared by the Rajasthan anti-terrorist squad revealed that the Samjhauta Express had been discussed as a potential target for an attack at a meeting of Hindutva bomb makers in February 2006; the group subsequently travelled to Indore.

In April 2016, Director General of NIA requested the United States government to provide information on LeT Key financier Arif Qasmani. The US charge sheet in 2009 accused Qasmani of funding the blasts. Later, in April 2016, NIA declared that Lt Col Purohit was never an accused in the case and there was no evidence of his involvement in the bombing. Per India TV, top police officials in a meeting on 21 July 2010 had decided to hand over the investigation to NIA as Haryana Police failed to bring the case to any logical conclusion and had also decided to probe the role of Hindu groups. The Union Law Minister Ravi Shankar Prasad hinted the UPA government had planted the angle of role of "Hindu terror" and questioned the suspect's release.

=== Accused ===
On 30 December 2010, National Investigation Agency suspected Swami Aseemanand to be behind the blasts. He had roped in Sandeep Dange, an engineering graduate, and Ramji Kalsangra, an electrician, to build the improvised explosive devices used in the blasts. On 8 January 2011, Aseemanand confessed that Saffron terror outfits were behind the bombing of Samjhauta express, a statement his council later stated was obtained under duress. Later, RSS sent a legal notice to CBI accusing it for deliberately leaking Swami Aseemanand's confession in media. RSS spokesman Ram Madavh called the investigation maligning of organisations and individuals.

However, in late March 2011, Aseemanand stated: "I have been pressurised mentally and physically by the investigating agencies to confess that I was behind these blasts." Aseemanand was charged on 20 June 2011 for planning the blast. In November 2011, Indian High Courts issued a stay notice to the National Intelligence Agency on the point that Aseemanand was tortured and coerced in prison and on the allegations that the investigation agency itself was biased by its association to the United Progressive Alliance government In early 2012, commentators started questioning the "Hindu" angle to the terror attacks, noting both the existence of an equally plausible "Muslim" angle and the near impossibility of proving any claims

Many initial reports suggested that the prime suspects in the bombing were the Islamic groups Lashkar-e-Toiba and Jaish-e-Mohammed, both of whom have been blamed for many high-profile bombings in the past. On 1 July 2009, the United States Treasury and UNSC placed sanctions on Lashkar-e-Toiba, and named Arif Qasmani as having played a role in the bombing. In 2009, Qasmani was hit with a travel ban and an asset freeze by the 1267 committee of the United Nations Security Council Qasmani, as of 2011, was still the United States' main suspect in the Samjhauta bombing.

On 12 February 2012, the National Investigation Agency of India arrested a suspect identified as Kamal Chouhan, former RSS worker from the Indore district in Madhya Pradesh and conducted intense questioning. According to sources, Chouhan had a possible role in planting the bomb in the train. Chouhan is believed to be a close aide of Ramji Kalsangra and Sandeep Dange, two key Indian suspects in the case on whom the agency has announced a cash reward of ₹ 1 million for information of their whereabouts. The National Investigation Agency is likely to file a fresh chargesheet in a next couple of days which will name Kamal Chauhan and Amit Chauhan as the two alleged bombers who along with Lokesh Sharma and Rajendra Pehalwan allegedly planted the four suitcase bombs in the train.

In late-June 2017, Times Now and India TV reported that a Pakistani national Ajmat Ali who was a suspect in the case were discharged within 14 days based on the statements of Gurdeep Singh who was the first investigation officer assigned to the case which were also mentioned in a deposition to a court 12 days earlier. Ali was arrested by Punjab police for not carrying valid papers and he was handed over to police of Haryana for interrogation. He was stated to match the description of the suspect who planted the bombs according to eyewitnesses and was accused of having used false identities by the police. Per a report, he had stated about undertaking reconnaissance of many prominent cities. He however was discharged by senior officials probing the case with the court order noting the police's statement that no proof had been found.

A report carried by The Hindu in July 2017 contained a statement of one of the senior officer Bharti Arora who had directed the suspect to be discharged, had headed the SIT at that time and was named by Gurdeep Singh in his statement, stated that his statement was being misread. She added that Ali was properly interrogated and discharged when nothing was found against him. She also stated that she would take legal action against the channel stating a sting report of letting-off the suspects in 14 days, for what she claimed was a "false report". NIA stated it would not investigate the claims about the case till court orders.

The Hindustan Times carried a report in September 2008 of statements from the narco-analysis test conducted on SIMI's extremist wing chief Safdar Nagori as well as other leaders who were Kamruddin Nagori and Amil Parvez. Safdar at the time was of the blast was in a hospital in Madhya Pradesh due to a fractured hand. Per reports of the test, he stated that Abdul Razzaq was involved in the blast and had informed him the blasts would be carried out with the help of a few Pakistani nationals. Kamruddin and Amil Parvez had stated that Razzak was close to Nagori, had informed him and discussed about the blasts. Safdar however denied any meeting was held to plot the blast. A video of Safdar's test was broadcast by Times Now in July 2017.Rediff carried a report in 2011 that the later statements by Aseemanand on Sunil Joshi telling him of his role in the blasts had caused confusion among NIA and both the testimonies were contrary to each other. Vikash Narain Rai, the former Haryana police officer who headed the SIT from 2007 to early 2010, told The Wire in June 2016 mentioned that the SIT's first suspect were Pakistan-based terror groups or organisations like SIMI, stating that they had investigated many Islamists including Nagori. He stated that it became clear they were not involved as investigations progressed.

Per a report by The Indian Express, Razzaq who had been in prison since August 2005 after being deported from Iran, was interrogated after Safdar's narcoanalysis and brought Qasmani to the attention of Intelligence Bureau as a Lashkar financier. Per diplomatic sources due to this a dossier was given with Qasmani's purported involvement to the United States which according to a note recording an informal meeting between the NIA probe team and FBI was the cause for sanctions by Treasury Department on him. Razzaq was questioned by Madhya Pradesh and Haryana Police regarding the blast, but no evidence of his involvement was stated to be found. Some police officers had also questioned the reliability of narcoanalysis, barred in USA and Europe, with a senior NIA officer stating that they had nothing but the statements of a man given under the effect of sodium pentathol.

On 20 March 2019, Special NIA court acquitted all four accused. "The NIA Special Court has concluded that the investigating agency has failed to prove the conspiracy charge and ruled that accused deserve a benefit of doubt", NIA Counsel RK Handa said. .

== Reactions ==
=== India ===
The Indian government and media initially began pointing the finger at Pakistan for the terror attacks. Widespread condemnation of Pakistan ensued, particularly from the opposition Bharatiya Janata Party, and Pakistan was accused of harbouring terrorists and intentionally derailing peace attempts with India. Indian Minister of Railways, Lalu Prasad Yadav, condemned the incident and went on to say that the attack was "an attempt to derail the improving relationship between India and Pakistan." He also announced compensation payments of Rs. 1,000,000 (approx. €17,500 or US$22,750) for the next-of-kin of each of the deceased and Rs. 50,000 for those injured. Home Minister Shivraj Patil claimed that "whoever is behind the incident is against peace and wants to spoil our growing relationship with other countries". Prime Minister Manmohan Singh expressed "anguish and grief" at the loss of life, and vowed that the culprits would be caught. India's foreign ministry also promised to issue visas for Pakistani relatives of those killed or injured in the blasts. Indian journalist Siddharth Varadarajan argued that the peace process should stay on track and that any wavering would be tantamount to surrendering to terrorism.

=== Pakistan ===
The government of Pakistan reacted in the same vein, through its Foreign Minister Khurshid Mahmud Kasuri, proclaiming this an act of terrorism that should be investigated by Indian authorities. Kasuri said that the terrorist attack would not halt his trip to India, as he "will be leaving tomorrow for Delhi to further the peace process." He went on to say that "we should hasten the peace process." In response to the terrorist attack, President Pervez Musharraf stated "such wanton acts of terrorism will only serve to further strengthen our resolve to attain the mutually desired objective of sustainable peace between the two countries." Musharraf also said that there must be a full Indian investigation of the attack. In regards to the upcoming peace talks, he stated "we will not allow elements which want to sabotage the ongoing peace process to succeed in their nefarious designs."
