= Lala Hanumant Sahay =

Indian freedom fighter

- Born: Delhi, British India
- Died: New Delhi, India
- Other name: Lala Ji
- Organization: Bharat Mata Society
- Known for: Indian independence movement ; Delhi conspiracy case
- Political party: Indian National Congress

Lala Hanumant Sahay (also referred to as Lala Ji) was an Indian nationalist revolutionary and freedom fighter from Chandani Chowk, New Delhi. He was part of the group convicted of an assassination attempt on Charles Hardinge, Viceroy of British India, in December 1912.

== Introduction to independence movement ==
Lala Ji was a businessman and wholesaler of foreign goods in Chandni Chowk, New Delhi, who became committed to the Indian independence struggle after regaining contact with his childhood friend, Har Dayal. He opened a national school in his house in Chailpuri, and appointed fellow revolutionary Master Amir Chand as the principal. This school of his house and the reading room of its library became a secret base for many revolutionaries, including Rash Behari Bose, Master Awadh Bihari, and Basanta Kumar Biswas. In 1907, Lala Ji became an active member of the Bharat Mata Society, formed under the leadership of Sufi Amba Prasad.

== Hardinge incident ==
In December 1912, when Charles Hardinge, Viceroy of British India, decided to leave Calcutta to move his capital to Delhi, Rash Behari Bose drew up a hasty plan to assassinate him, and Sahay became involved in the plot. On 23 December 1912, Bose threw a homemade bomb into the Viceroy's howdah as the ceremonial procession was moving through Chandni Chowk, seriously injuring Hardinge and killing one of his staff. To avoid arrest, Lala Ji left Delhi and hid in the house of his friend Sundar Lal in Solan, in the hills of Shimla. He was discovered at this house by police who were looking for Sundar in relation to another case.

Lala Ji was co-accused along with Master Amir Chand, Master Awadh Bihari, Bhai Balmukund and Basanta Kumar Biswas for the attack, and was sentenced to life imprisonment in Kalapani jail in the Andaman Islands, later decreased to seven years. The other four defendants were sentenced to death.

== Later life ==
After his release from prison, Lala Ji joined Indian National Congress, and was jailed several more times before Indian independence in 1947.
