= Lord Hardinge =

Lord Hardinge may refer to:

- Henry Hardinge, 1st Viscount Hardinge (1755–1856), British field marshal
- Baron Hardinge of Penshurst, a title in the Peerage of the United Kingdom
