= Winifred Hardinge, Baroness Hardinge of Penshurst =

British aristocrat and Vicereine of India

Her Excellency The Right Honourable The Lady Hardinge of Penshurst CI
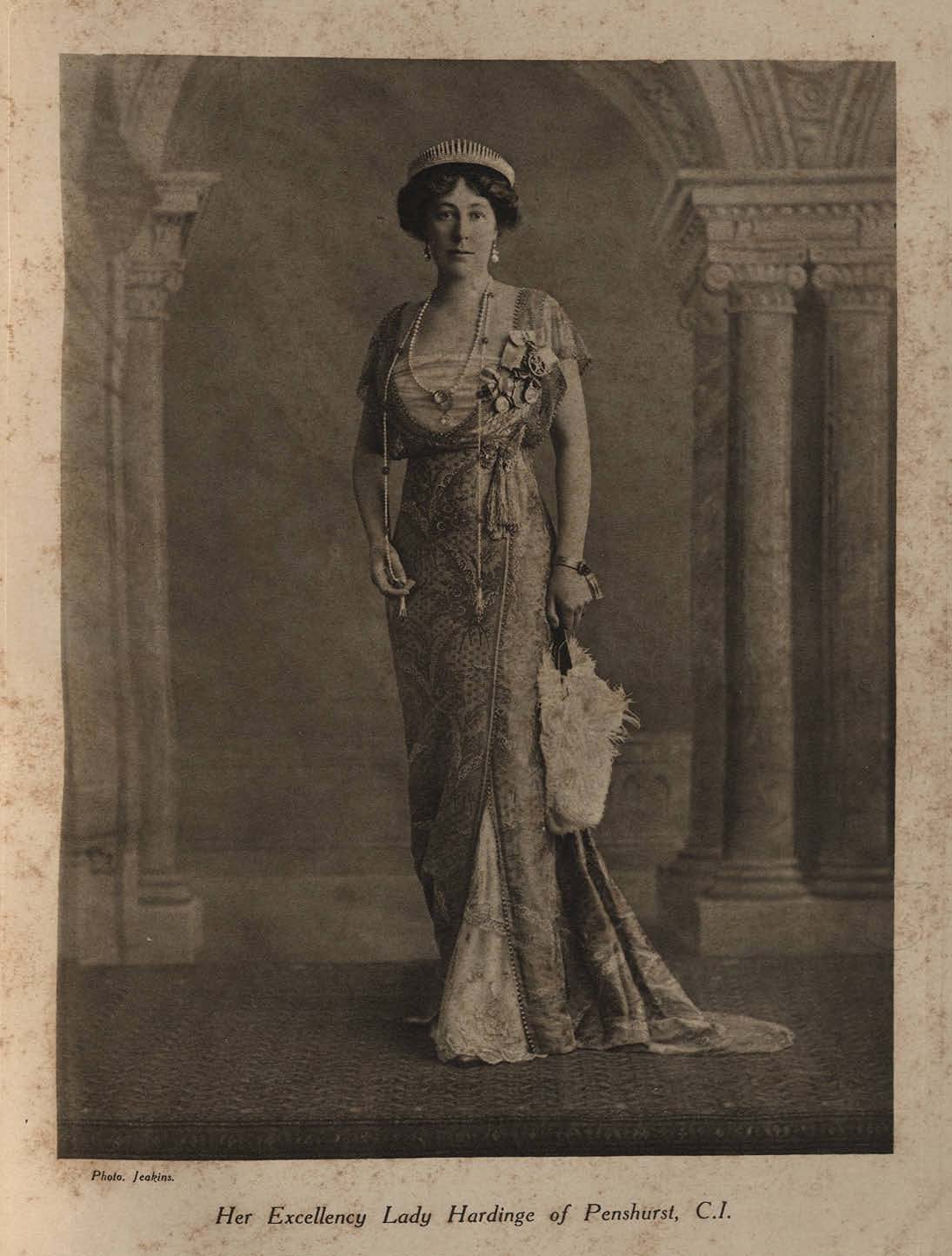
- Lady Hardinge, 1914

Viceregal-Consort of India
- In office 23 November 1910 – 11 June 1914
- Monarch: George V
- Governor- General: The Baron Hardinge of Penshurst
- Preceded by: The Countess of Minto
- Succeeded by: The Lady Chelmsford

Personal details
- Born: Winifred Selina Sturt; 17 March 1868
- Died: 11 July 1914 (aged 46) Penshurst, Kent, England
- Spouse: Charles Hardinge, 1st Baron Hardinge of Penshurst
- Children: 3

Winifred Selina Hardinge, Baroness Hardinge of Penshurst, CI (née Sturt; 17 March 1868 – 11 July 1914) was a British aristocrat, courtier and Vicereine of India.

== Family ==
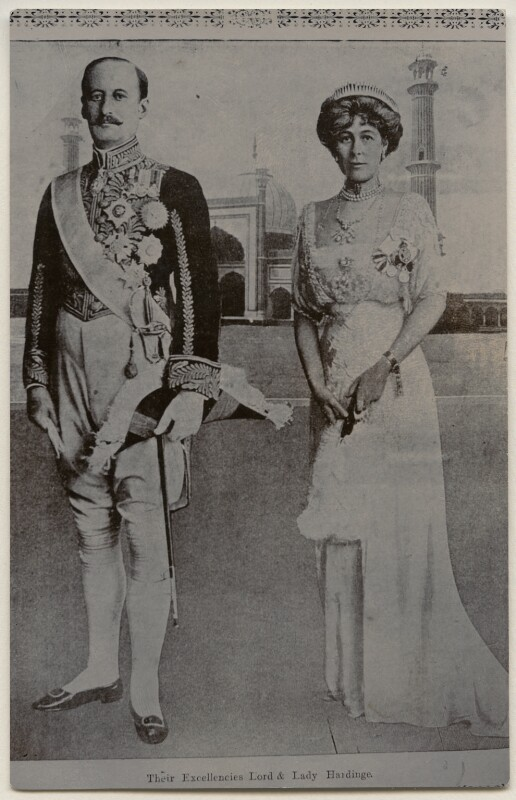
Lord and Lady Hardinge

Winifred Selina ("Bena") Sturt was the second daughter of Henry Gerard Sturt, 1st Baron Alington, of Crichel, Dorset, and his first wife Lady Augusta Bingham, the first daughter of George Charles Bingham, 3rd Earl of Lucan.

Henry Gerard Sturt was a racing magnate and close friend of Edward, Prince of Wales. The Sturt family opposed Winifred's engagement to Charles Hardinge on account of Winifred and Charles' consanguinity (they were first cousins), as well as Hardinge's relative indigence, but the couple married on 17 April 1890.

The couple had three children:

- Lieutenant Honourable Edward Hardinge, DSO (1892–1914), an officer in the 15th Hussars, who died of wounds received during WWI.
- Alexander Hardinge (1894–1960), who succeeded his father as Lord Hardinge of Penshurst
- Honourable Diamond Evelyn Violet Hardinge (1900–1927)

== Court ==
Mrs. Charles Hardinge was a Woman of the Bedchamber to the Princess of Wales from 1893. When Edward VII acceded the throne in 1901, she continued as a Woman of the Bedchamber to the new queen, Alexandra, serving throughout the reign 1901–1910. When her husband was knighted in 1904, she became Lady Hardinge.

After her husband was created Baron Hardinge of Penshurst in 1910, she became The Lady Hardinge of Penshurst, and was appointed an Extra Lady of the Bedchamber to the now Dowager Queen Alexandra.

== India ==
Charles Hardinge was appointed Viceroy of India in late 1910, and his wife accompanied him to India. The tenure was a memorable one, and included the visit of King George V, and the Delhi Durbar of 1911, as well as the move of the capital from Calcutta to New Delhi in 1911.

Lady Hardinge of Penshurst died on 11 July 1914 at the age of 46.

== Legacy ==
She had an instrumental role in starting the Lady Hardinge Medical College, Delhi - first medical school exclusively for women in India. Initially to be named Queen Mary's College and Hospital, after Lady Hardinge's death in 1914 it was named after her to honour her contribution.
