= Nathuram Godse =

Assassin of Mahatma Gandhi (1910–1949)

Nathuram Vinayak Godse
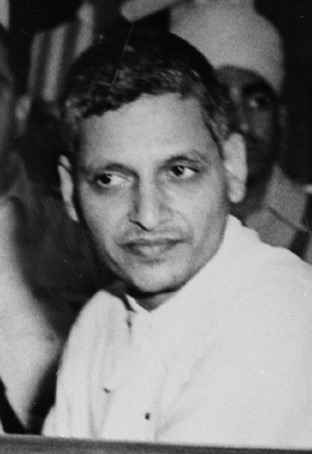
- Godse at his trial for the assassination of Mahatma Gandhi in 1948
- Born: Ramachandra Vinayak Godse; 19 May 1910; Baramati, Bombay Presidency, British India (present-day Maharashtra, India)
- Died: 15 November 1949 (aged 39); Ambala Central Jail, East Punjab, India (present-day Haryana, India)
- Cause of death: Death by hanging
- Organization(s): Rashtriya Swayamsevak Sangh; Hindu Mahasabha
- Known for: Assassination of Mahatma Gandhi
- Status: Executed
- Conviction: Murder
- Penalty: Death

Details
- Victims: Mahatma Gandhi
- Date: 30 January 1948
- Weapon: Beretta M 1934 semi-automatic pistol
- Writing career
- Relatives: Gopal Godse (brother)
- Notable work: Why I Killed Gandhi

Nathuram Vinayak Godse IPA: [nət̪ʰuɾam ʋinajək ɡoɖse] (19 May 1910 – 15 November 1949) was the assassin of Mahatma Gandhi. He was a Hindu nationalist from Maharashtra who shot Gandhi in the chest three times at point blank range at a multi-faith prayer meeting in Birla House in New Delhi on 30 January 1948. Godse was a prominent populariser of the works of his mentor, Vinayak Damodar Savarkar, who had formulated the Hindu nationalist ideology of Hindutva. Godse was a member of the Hindu Mahasabha, a Hindutva political party, and of the Rashtriya Swayamsevak Sangh (RSS), a right-wing Hindutva paramilitary organisation.

Godse made two unsuccessful attempts to assassinate Mahatma Gandhi in 1944 before his third successful attempt in 1948. Soon after Mahatma Gandhi had fallen from the fatal shots at the prayer meeting, and while the attendant crowd was in shock, Godse was grasped and restrained by Herbert Reiner Jr., a vice-consul at the new American embassy in Delhi who was also attending; eventually, Godse was taken away by the police. Godse had plotted the assassination with Narayan Apte and six others.

Godse claimed Gandhi had favoured the political demands of Indian Muslims during the partition of India of 1947. After a trial that lasted over a year, Godse was sentenced to death on 8 November 1949. Although pleas for clemency were made by Gandhi's two sons, Manilal Gandhi and Ramdas Gandhi, they were turned down by India's prime minister Jawaharlal Nehru, deputy prime minister Vallabhbhai Patel, and Governor-General Chakravarti Rajagopalachari, and Godse was executed at the Ambala Central Jail on 15 November 1949.

== Early life ==
Nathuram Vinayakrao Godse was born into a Maharashtrian Chitpavan Brahmin family. His father, Vinayak Vamanrao Godse, was a postal employee; his mother was Lakshmi (née Godavari). At birth, he was named Ramachandra. Nathuram was given his name due to his parents' fear that a curse targeted their male children, caused by the loss of their three previous sons. Young Ramachandra was therefore brought up as a girl for the first few years of his life, including having his nose pierced and being made to wear a nose-ring (nath in Marathi). It was then that he earned the nickname "Nathuram" (literally "Ram with a nose-ring"). After his younger brother was born, they switched to treating him as a boy.

Godse attended the local school at Baramati through the fifth standard, after which he was sent to live with an aunt in Pune so that he could study at an English-language school.

== Political career and beliefs ==
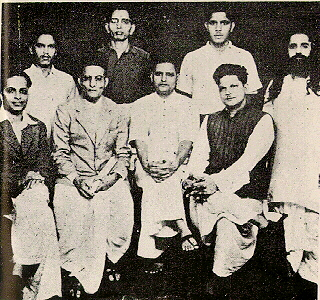
Group photo of people accused in the murder of Mahatma Gandhi. Standing (L to R): Shankar Kistaiya, Gopal Godse, Madan Lal Pahwa, Digambar Ramchandra Badge. Seated (L to R): Narayan Apte, Vinayak D. Savarkar, Nathuram Godse, Vishnu Karkare

Godse dropped out of high school and became an activist with Hindu nationalist organisations Rashtriya Swayamsevak Sangh (RSS; National Volunteer Organisation) and Hindu Mahasabha, although the exact dates of his membership are uncertain.

== RSS membership ==
Godse joined the RSS in Sangli (Maharashtra) in 1932 as a boudhik karyawah (ground worker), and simultaneously remained a member of the far-right Hindu Mahasabha. He often wrote articles in newspapers to publicise his thoughts. During this time, Godse and M. S. Golwalkar, later RSS chief, often worked together, and they translated Babarao Savarkar's book "Rashtra Mimansa" into English. They had a falling out when Golwalkar took the entire credit for this translation. In the early 1940s, Godse formed his own organisation, "Hindu Rashtra Dal" on the Vijayadashami day of 1942, though he continued to remain a member of the RSS and Hindu Mahasabha.

In 1946, Godse claimed to have left the RSS and moved to the Hindu Mahasabha over the issue of the partition of India. However, historical sources do not corroborate this claim; an investigation published by The Caravan in January 2020 revealed that up until his final days, Godse was listed as a member in records kept by the RSS of meetings that took place long after he was supposed to have left the organisation. His family has also said that he had never left the RSS, highlighting that he held membership at the RSS as well as the Hindu Mahasabha. Godse's 1946 claim is also refuted by his first deposition in Marathi after he assassinated Gandhi, where he says that while he did join the Hindu Mahasabha, "I remained active in Rashtriya Swayamsevak Sangh."

== Assassination of Mahatma Gandhi ==
In May 1944, Godse attempted to assassinate Gandhi with a knife. He led a group of 15 to 20 young men who rushed at Gandhi during a prayer meeting at Panchgani. Godse and his group were prevented from attacking Gandhi by the crowds of people. He was released due to Gandhi's own policy of declining to press criminal charges.

In September 1944, Godse again led another group to block Gandhi's passage from Sevagram to Mumbai. This time Godse was arrested with a dagger and he uttered threats to kill Gandhi. He was released again owing to Gandhi's policy of not pressing criminal charges.

At 05:05 pm on 30 January 1948, as Gandhi made his way to a prayer meeting on a raised lawn behind Birla House, a mansion in New Delhi, where he was staying, Godse stepped out of the crowd flanking his path to the dais. He fired three bullets into Gandhi's chest. Gandhi fell immediately, sending the attendant crowd into a state of shock. Herbert Reiner Jr., a 32-year-old vice-consul at the new American embassy in Delhi, was the first to rush forward and grasp Godse by the shoulders, spinning him into the arms of some military personnel, who disarmed him. Reiner then held Godse by the neck and shoulders until he was taken away by the military and police. Reiner reported later that in the moments before he apprehended him, Godse looked a little stunned at how easily he had carried out his plan. Gandhi was taken back to his room in Birla House, where he died soon thereafter.

== Trial and execution ==
Godse was put on trial at the Punjab High Court, at Peterhoff, Shimla. On 8 November 1949, he was sentenced to death. Although pleas for commutation were made by Gandhi's two sons, Manilal Gandhi and Ramdas Gandhi, they were turned down by India's prime minister Jawaharlal Nehru, deputy prime minister Vallabhbhai Patel and Governor-General Chakravarti Rajagopalachari, and Godse was hanged at Ambala Central Jail on 15 November 1949.

== Aftermath ==
Millions of Indians mourned Gandhi's assassination; the Hindu Mahasabha was vilified and the Rashtriya Swayamsevak Sangh was temporarily banned.

The RSS has consistently denied any connection with Godse. It has maintained, contrary to evidence and accounts cited earlier, that Godse "left RSS in the mid-1930s". However, Nathuram Godse's brother Gopal Godse stated that all the Godse brothers were members of the RSS at the time of the assassination and blamed the RSS for disowning them. The other members of the Godse family too have denied that he ever left the RSS. He remained in the position of boudhik karyawah (intellectual worker) in the RSS until his death.

== Terrorist act ==
The assassination of Mahatma Gandhi has been portrayed in retrospect as an act of Hindutva fanatical terror. In the 2011 book Godse's Children: Hindutva Terror in India, journalist Subhash Gatade called the assassination "the first terrorist act in independent India", and, as one scholar put it, "the harbinger of 'Hindutva terrorism' in India". In a 2012 review of Gatade's work, author Rohini Hensman concurred that if terrorism is defined as violence in pursuit of a political goal, then "the assassination of Gandhi could indeed be seen as a terrorist act".

== Attempts at image rehabilitation ==
Me Nathuram Godse Boltoy (This is Nathuram Godse Speaking) is a two-act play written in the Marathi language by Pradeep Dalvi. It is based on the book May It Please Your Honour written by Nathuram's brother Gopal Godse. According to Karline McLain, the play "enacts Godse's defense plea" and thus "explores the assassination of Gandhi and the trial of Godse from Godse's point of view.

In 2014, following the Bharatiya Janata Party's rise to power, the Hindu Mahasabha began attempts to rehabilitate Godse and portray him as a patriot. It requested Prime Minister Narendra Modi to install a bust of Godse. It created a documentary film Desh Bhakt Nathuram Godse (Patriot Nathuram Godse) for release on the death anniversary of Gandhi on 30 January 2015. There were attempts to build a temple for Godse and to celebrate 30 January as a Shaurya Diwas ("Bravery Day"). A civil suit was filed in Pune Court asking for a ban on the documentary film.

In May 2019, in the lead up to the final phase of Indian elections, BJP's candidate from Bhopal, Pragya Thakur, called Godse a "patriot". Facing intense backlash, she apologised later.

As Hindutva politics became more widespread in India, there have been attempts to commemorate Godse. The city of Meerut was proposed to be renamed after him but the possibility of such a name change was ruled out by the district magistrate.

== In popular culture ==
- Nine Hours to Rama, Stanley A. Wolpert (1962)
- Gandhi's Assassin, Dhirendra K. Jha (2023)
- Gandhi Godse – Ek Yudh (2023)
- Godse's Children: Hindutva Terror in India (2011)

== Bibliography ==
- Report of Commission of Inquiry into Conspiracy to Murder Mahatma Gandhi (1969)
- Hansen, Thomas Blom (1999a), The Saffron Wave: Democracy and Hindu Nationalism in Modern India, Princeton University Press, pp. 249–, ISBN 1-4008-2305-6
- Hardiman, David (2003), Gandhi in His Time and Ours: The Global Legacy of His Ideas, Columbia University Press, pp. 174–76, ISBN 9780231131148
- Khosla, G.D., Murder of the Mahatma and Other Cases from a Judge's Notebook, Jaico Publishing House, 1968. ISBN 0-88253-051-8
- Mallot, J. Edward (2012), Memory, Nationalism, and Narrative in Contemporary South Asia, Palgrave Macmillan, pp. 75–, ISBN 978-1-137-00705-6
- Malgonkar, Manohar (2008). The Men Who Killed Gandhi, New Delhi: Roli Books, ISBN 978-81-7436-617-7
- Markovits, Claude (2004), The UnGandhian Gandhi: The Life and Afterlife of the Mahatma, Anthem Press, ISBN 978-1-84331-127-0
- Nash, Jay Robert (1981), Almanac of World Crime, New York: Rowman & Littlefield, p. 69, ISBN 978-1-4617-4768-0
