= Mary Elliot-Murray-Kynynmound, Countess of Minto =

British aristocrat and Vicereine of India

Her Excellency The Right Honourable The Countess of Minto CI DStJ
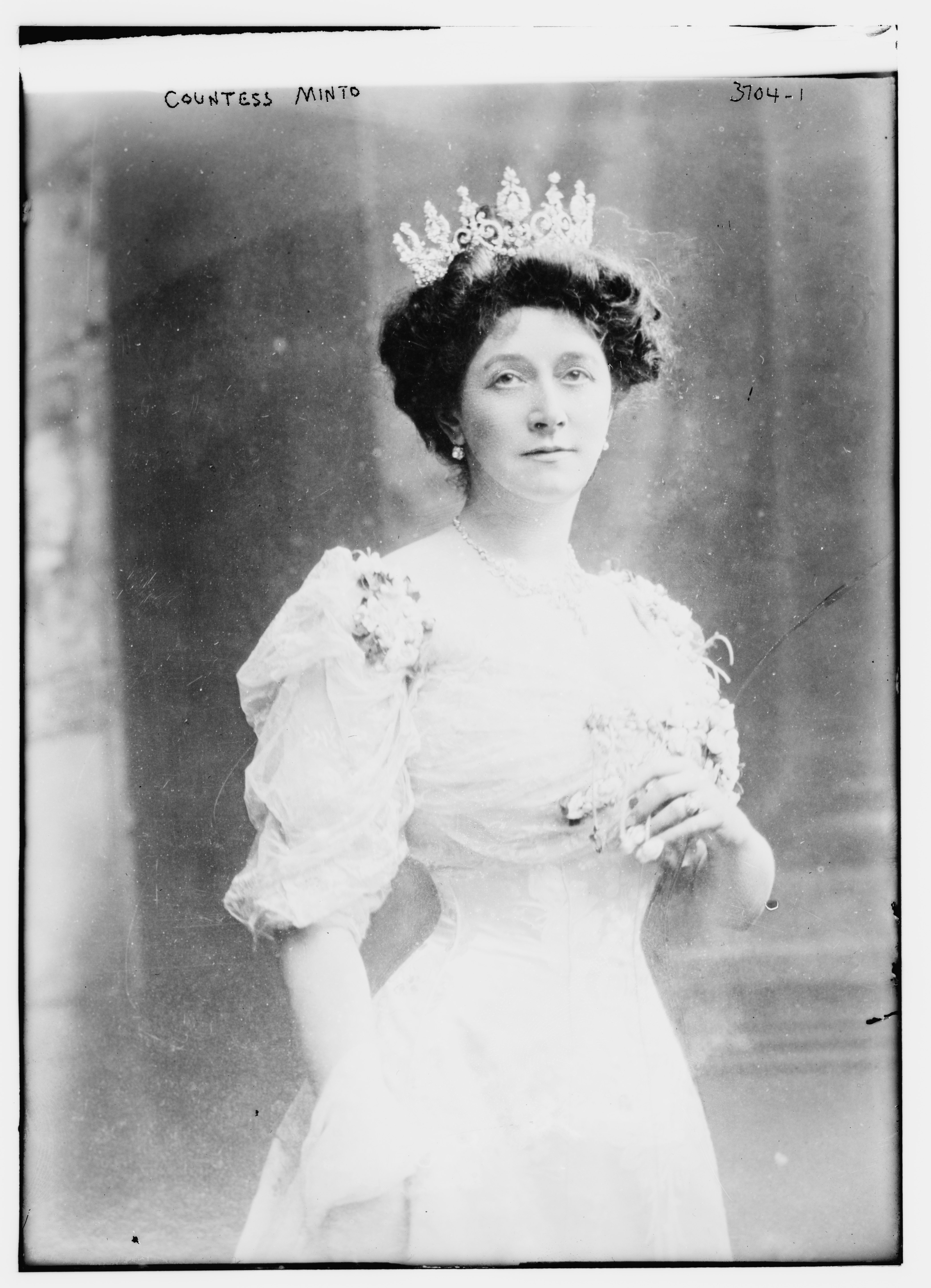

Viceregal-Consort of India
- In office 18 November 1905 – 23 November 1910
- Monarchs: Edward VII; George V
- Governor-General: The Earl of Minto
- Preceded by: The Lady Curzon of Kedleston
- Succeeded by: The Lady Hardinge of Penshurst

Personal details
- Born: 13 November 1858 Windsor Castle, Berkshire, England
- Died: 14 July 1940 (aged 81) London, England
- Resting place: Minto, Scottish Borders
- Spouse: Gilbert Elliot-Murray-Kynynmound, Viscount Melgund (m. 1883)
- Children: 5, including Victor
- Parent(s): Hon. Charles Grey; Caroline Farquhar

Mary Caroline Elliot-Murray-Kynynmound, Countess of Minto CI, DStJ (née Grey; 13 November 1858 – 14 July 1940) was a British aristocrat, Vicereine of India, and courtier to Queen Mary. She was a prominent healthcare campaigner in Canada and India, respectively.

== Early life and family ==
She was born Mary Caroline Grey on 13 November 1858, the youngest of five children of General Charles Grey, courtier to Prince Albert and Queen Victoria, and his wife, Caroline, née Farquhar. She was a granddaughter of Prime Minister Charles Grey, 2nd Earl Grey. She was raised at the Court of St James's in Windsor and St James's Palace, London. Her brother was Albert Grey, 4th Earl Grey.

On 28 July 1883, she married Gilbert Elliot-Murray-Kynynmound, becoming countess of Minto when her husband succeeded to his father's title in 1891. They had five children: Eileen, Ruby, Violet, Victor and Gavin.

== Canada ==
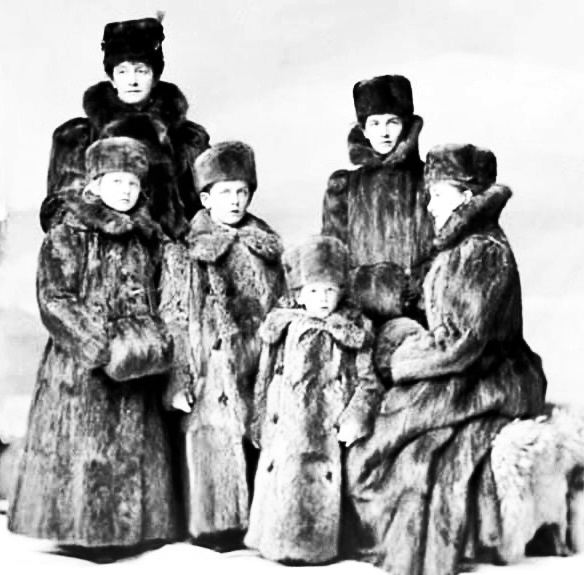
Lady Minto and her five children dressed for winter in Ottawa, 1901

In 1898, Lady Minto's husband was appointed governor-general of Canada. Her projects during their six-year stay in Canada included instituting a Queen Victoria memorial fund to raise money for rural cottage hospitals with the Victorian Order of Nurses. Several hospitals were founded in her name, including the Lady Minto Hospital in Ontario and the Lady Minto wing at the Ottawa Maternity Hospital.

She helped produce a book of historical Manitoban vignettes The little Manitoban: A child's story-book issued under the distinguished patronage of Her Excellency the Countess of Minto for the benefit of the Children's Aid Society of Winnipeg.

She and her husband appeared on the Canadian four-dollar bill in 1902.

== Vicereine of India ==
The Mintos were appointed viceroy and vicereine of India from 1905 to 1910. She became involved with the Countess of Dufferin Fund for the improvement of women's healthcare, using her connections to secure government funding for it, and launched the Lady Minto Indian Nursing Association, which built on the work of Mary Curzon. As part of a two-week fête that she held in 1907 to fundraise for the Association, she launched a set of three postage stamps depicting herself and her husband.

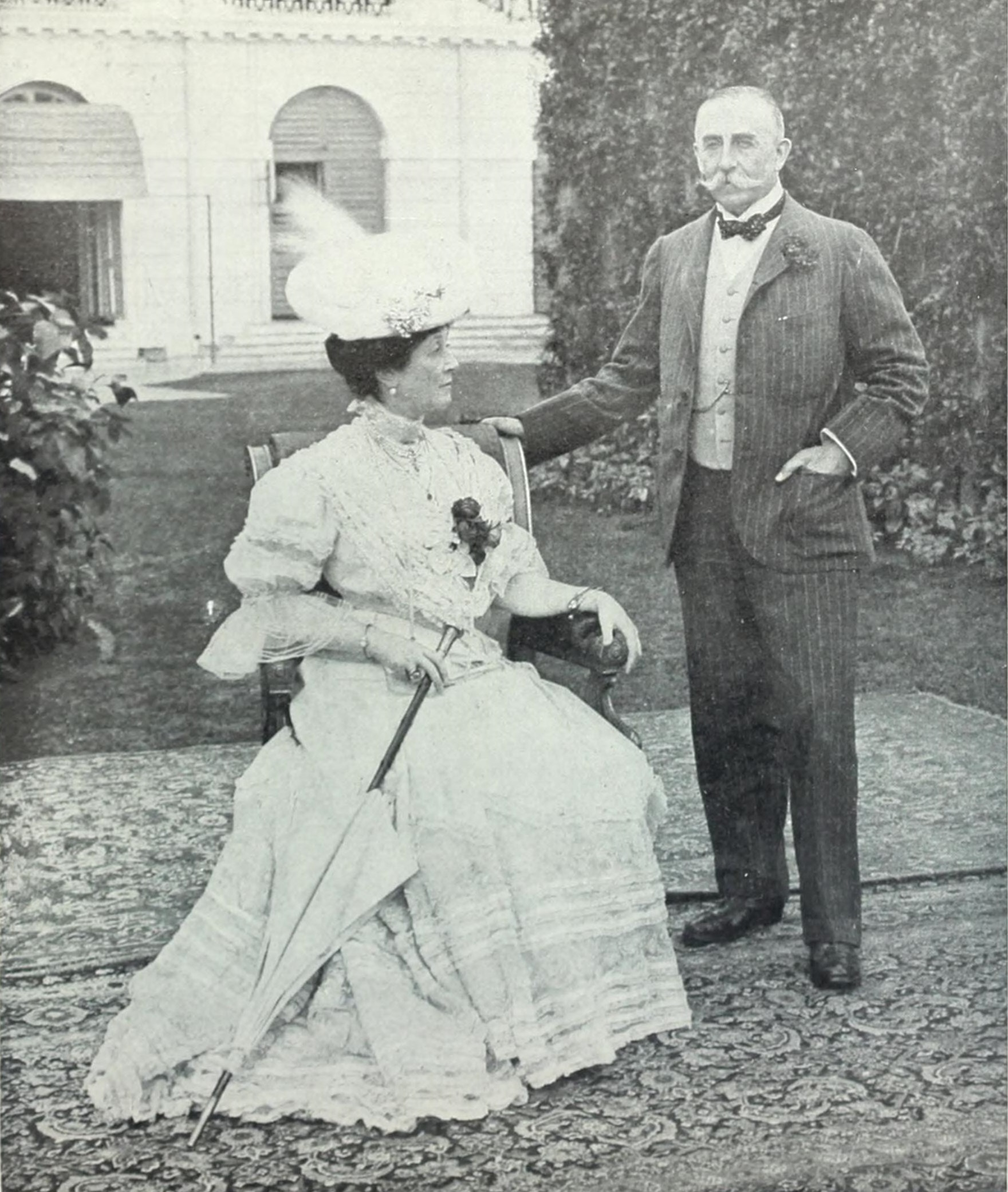
Lady Minto, as Vicereine of India

== Later life ==
On her return to England, Lady Minto was appointed lady of the bedchamber to Queen Mary, and continued her involvement in healthcare programmes, serving on the board of the Territorial Army Nursing Service. In 1934 she used her journals and her husband's correspondence as the basis for her book, India, Minto and Morley, and she also contributed to Margot Asquith’s Myself When Young and to John Buchan's biography of her husband.

Predeceased by her husband and two of her children, including the death of her son Gavin in the First World War, she died at her home at Hambleton, Godalming, on 14 July 1940.

Lady Minto was a hockey fan and a keen figure-skater, co-founding the Minto Skating Club with her husband in Ottawa in 1903/4.
