= Herbert Reiner Jr. =

American diplomat (1916–1999)

Herbert Thomas Reiner Jr.
- Born: September 21, 1916; Brattleboro, Vermont
- Died: December 28, 1999 (aged 83); Cotuit, Massachusetts
- Occupation: Career diplomat
- Known for: Capturing the assassin of Mahatma Gandhi

Herbert Thomas "Tom" Reiner Jr. (September 21, 1916 – December 28, 1999) was an American career diplomat who, while on a posting in India from 1947 to 1949, played a key role in capturing Mahatma Gandhi's assassin, Nathuram Godse. Reiner was among those present when Godse fatally shot Gandhi at an evening prayer meeting in New Delhi on January 30, 1948. Moments after the shooting, while the attending crowd was still in shock, Reiner rushed forward, grasping Godse by the shoulders and firmly holding him until military and police personnel took him away. In the days following, Reiner's action was reported in newspapers around the world.

== Early life and career ==
Reiner was born in Brattleboro, Vermont, and raised in Lancaster, Massachusetts, attending Leominster High School in Leominster, Massachusetts, and graduating in 1933. He received his bachelor's degree from Bates College, and a master's from Clark University. He served in the US Navy in World War II as a Sino-American Cooperative Organization (SACO) economic intelligence assistant, (Note: "LCDR Herbert (Tom) Reiner, a former SACO economic intelligence assistant, reported for duty at the U.S. embassy, New Delhi".) and was discharged in 1946 as a Lieutenant Commander.

== Diplomatic career ==
=== Posting in India ===
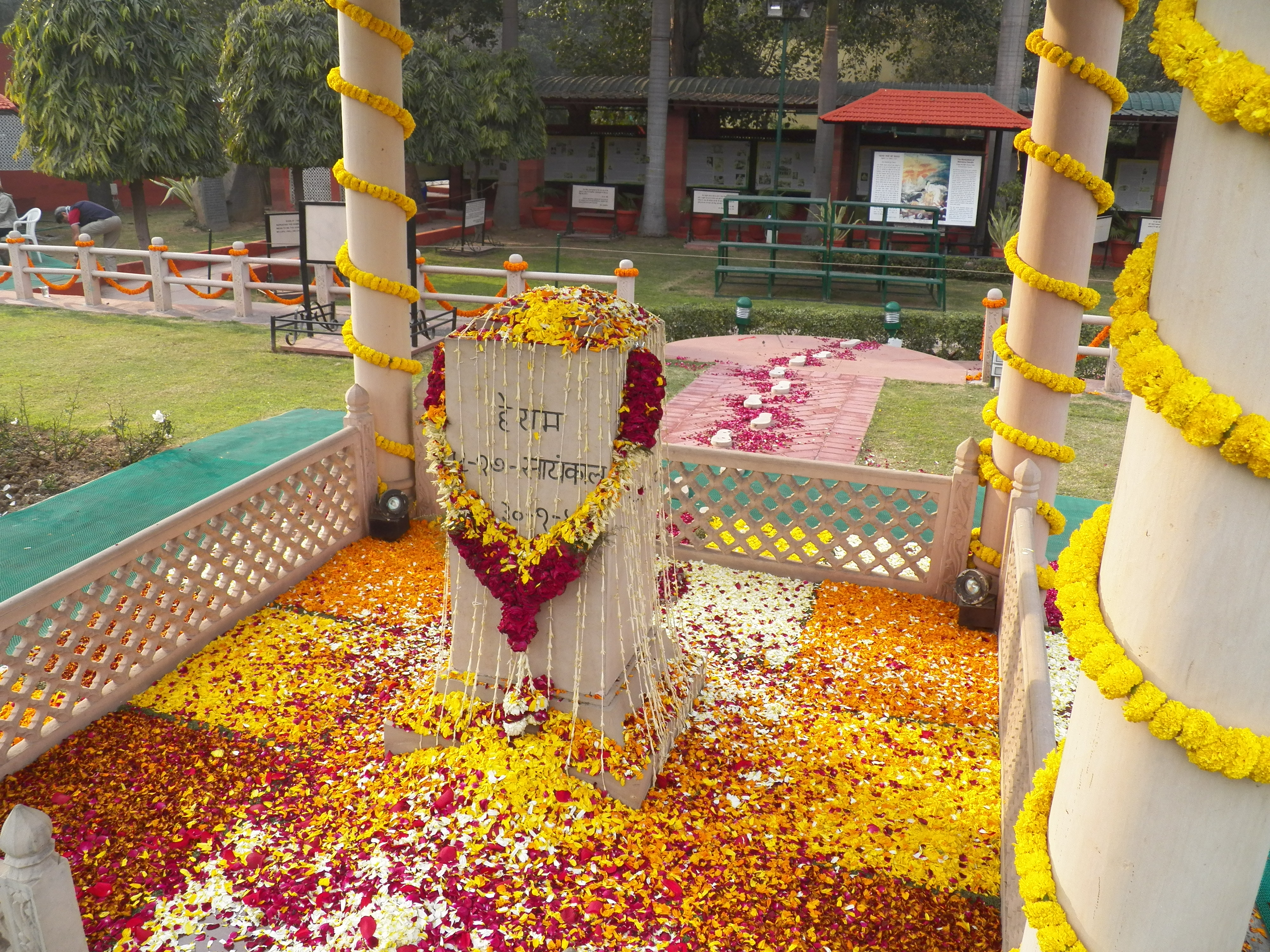
Memorial at the former Birla House, New Delhi, India where Mahatma Gandhi was assassinated at 5:17 p.m. on 30 January 1948 on his way to a prayer meeting. Stylized footsteps are shown leading to the memorial.

Reiner arrived in newly independent India in 1947 as a disbursing and financial officer for the US State Department, (Note: "Mr Reiner, who is 32, went to India in 1947 as a disbursing and financial officer for the American State Department. He served in the navy during the war, and was discharged as a Lieutenant Commander".) in the US Embassy in New Delhi, with the rank of vice-consul. In early September 1947, Gandhi had moved to Delhi in order to help stem the violent rioting there, and in the neighboring province of East Punjab. The rioting had come in the wake of the partition of the British Indian empire, which had accompanied the creation of the newly independent dominions of India and Pakistan, and involved large, chaotic, transfers of the population between them. (Note: "Communal massacres sparked a chaotic two-way flight of Hindus and Sikhs from Pakistan and Muslims from India. In all an estimated 15 million people were displaced in what became the largest forced migration in the twentieth century".) Soon after arrival, Reiner had written to his parents, expressing a wish to see Gandhi at one of his evening multi-faith prayer meetings. (Note: "STAMFORD, Conn, Jan. 31- Herbert Reiner Jr., the American who seized the assassin of Mohandas K. Gandhi, had recently expressed the hope in a letter that he might some day see the Indian leader and attend one of his prayer meetings. His mother, Mrs. Herbert Reiner Sr., said at her home here today that it was apparently to fulfill that hope that her son was present when Mr. Gandhi was slain".) (Note: "After arriving in India, Reiner wrote to his mother of his hope to meet Gandhi and attend one of his prayer meetings. On Jan. 30, 1948, he went to a prayer meeting to catch a glimpse of Gandhi. It was to be Gandhi's last meeting".) Gandhi had initially been staying at the scheduled caste Balmiki Temple, near Gole Market in the northern regions of New Delhi, and holding his prayer meetings there, but as the temple was requisitioned for sheltering refugees of the partition, he moved to Birla House, a large mansion on what was then Albuquerque Road in south-central New Delhi, not far from Diplomatic Enclave. Gandhi was living in two unpretentious rooms in the left wing of Birla House, and conducting the prayer meetings on a raised lawn behind the mansion.

On January 30, 1948, Reiner reached Birla House after work, arriving fifteen minutes before the scheduled start of the prayer meeting at 5 p.m., and finding himself in a relatively small crowd. Although there were some armed guards present, Reiner felt that the security measures were inadequate, especially in view of an attempted bomb explosion at the same location ten days before. By the time Gandhi and his small party reached the garden area a few minutes after five, the crowd had swelled to several hundred, which Reiner described as comprising "schoolboys, girls, sweepers, members of the armed services, businessmen, sadhus, holymen, and even vendors displaying pictures of 'Bapu'". At first, Reiner had been at some distance from the path leading to the dais, but he moved forward, explaining later, "An impulse to see more, and at a closer range, of this Indian leader impelled me to move away from the group in which I had been standing to the edge of the terrace steps".

As Gandhi was walking briskly up the steps leading to the lawn, an unidentified man in the crowd spoke up, somewhat insolently in Reiner's recollection, "Gandhiji, you are late". Gandhi slowed down his pace, turned toward the man, and gave him an annoyed look, passing directly in front of Reiner at that moment. But no sooner had Gandhi reached the top of the steps than another man, a stocky Indian man, in his 30s, and dressed in khaki clothes, stepped out from the crowd and into Gandhi's path. He soon fired several shots up close, at once felling Gandhi. The BBC correspondent Robert Stimson described what happened next in a radio report filed that night: "For a few seconds no one could believe what had happened; every one seemed dazed and numb. And then a young American who had come for prayers rushed forward and seized the shoulders of the man in the khaki coat. That broke the spell. ... Half a dozen people stooped to lift Gandhi. Others hurled themselves upon the attacker. ... He was overpowered and taken away". Others, as well, described how the crowd seemed paralyzed until Reiner's action. (Note: "The crowd was paralyzed as the two grandchildren lifted the frail Gandhi and carried him into his room in Birla House. Tom Reiner, the United States vice-consul, a newcomer to India, who had attended the prayer meeting, seized the assassin ...")

Robert Trumbull of The New York Times, who was an eyewitness, described Reiner's action in a front-page story on January 31, 1948, "The assassin was seized by Tom Reiner of Lancaster, Mass., a vice consul attached to the American Embassy and a recent arrival in India. ... Mr. Reiner grasped the assailant by the shoulders and shoved him toward several police guards. Only then did the crowd begin to grasp what had happened and a forest of fists belabored the assassin ..." Reiner too had noticed a man in khaki step into the path leading to the dais, but his further view was occluded by a party of associates following Gandhi. He soon heard sounds, though, which in his words were "not loud, not ringing, and not unlike the reports of damp firecrackers ..." and which for a moment made him wonder if some sort of celebration was not underway.

After Gandhi had fallen, Reiner thought Godse himself looked a little stunned at how easily he had carried out his plan. Reiner reported, "(Godse) stood nearly motionless with a small beretta dangling in his right hand and to my knowledge made no attempt to escape or to take his own fire. ... Moving toward Godse I extended my right arm in an attempt to seize his gun but in doing so grasped his right shoulder in a manner that spun him into the hands of Royal Indian Air Force men, also spectators, who disarmed him. I then fastened a firm grasp on his neck and shoulders until other military and police took him into custody". Reiner then stepped away, in some relief, for, on account of his proximity to Godse, he had been fearing receiving a blow or even a bullet from the frenzied crowd.

Elsewhere, Reiner recalled, "People were standing as though paralyzed. I moved around them, grasped his shoulder and spun him around, then took a firmer grip on his shoulders". In one account of Gandhi's assassination, Reiner is said to have "seized and pummeled" Godse. (Note: "As Gandhi was cradled by his devotees and carried back to the house, the assassin was seized and pummeled by the thirty-two-year-old diplomatic officer Herbert Reiner of Springdale, Connecticut.(Citing letter by the then Deputy High Commissioner of the UK in New Delhi, A. C. B. Symon to Philip Noel-Baker, the Secretary of State for Commonwealth Relations, 4 February 1948, in the British National Archives collection of correspondence of the Office of the Prime Minister, Clement Attlee, 1946–1951, TNA:PREM8/741.)") In another account, he is said to have wished to remain anonymous. (Note: "The unsung hero of the day, however, who wishes to remain anonymous, is an official of the American Embassy at Delhi, who is the first to realise what has happened, and leaps forward and grips the assassin by the arm. If this young American had not done what he did, Nathuram Godse would probably have shot his way out for he still had four unspent bullets in his pistol".) Authors N. H. Pronko and J. W. Bowles, in Empirical Foundations of Psychology, consider Reiner's actions as having constituted a critical "new stimulus" that paved the way from a "no response period" of the crowd—which had begun in the wake of the "disturbing stimulus" of the shooting—to "coordinated and adjustmental" behaviors. Godse was put on trial in the summer of 1948; he was sentenced to death and hanged in November 1949.

=== Later career and life ===
After his time in India, Reiner briefly worked as assistant attache at the American Legation in Budapest, Hungary. He moved to Korea in June 1949, and during the Korean War, served as a consul general during the Battle of the Pusan Perimeter; in later years, he served as consul general in Freetown, Sierra Leone, and Johannesburg, South Africa. He ended his diplomatic career in Canberra, Australia, and moved to Cape Cod in 1976. Reiner died on December 28, 1999, at his home in Cotuit, Massachusetts.
