= Tim Horton =

Canadian ice hockey player and businessman (1930–1974)

- Hockey Hall of Fame, 1977
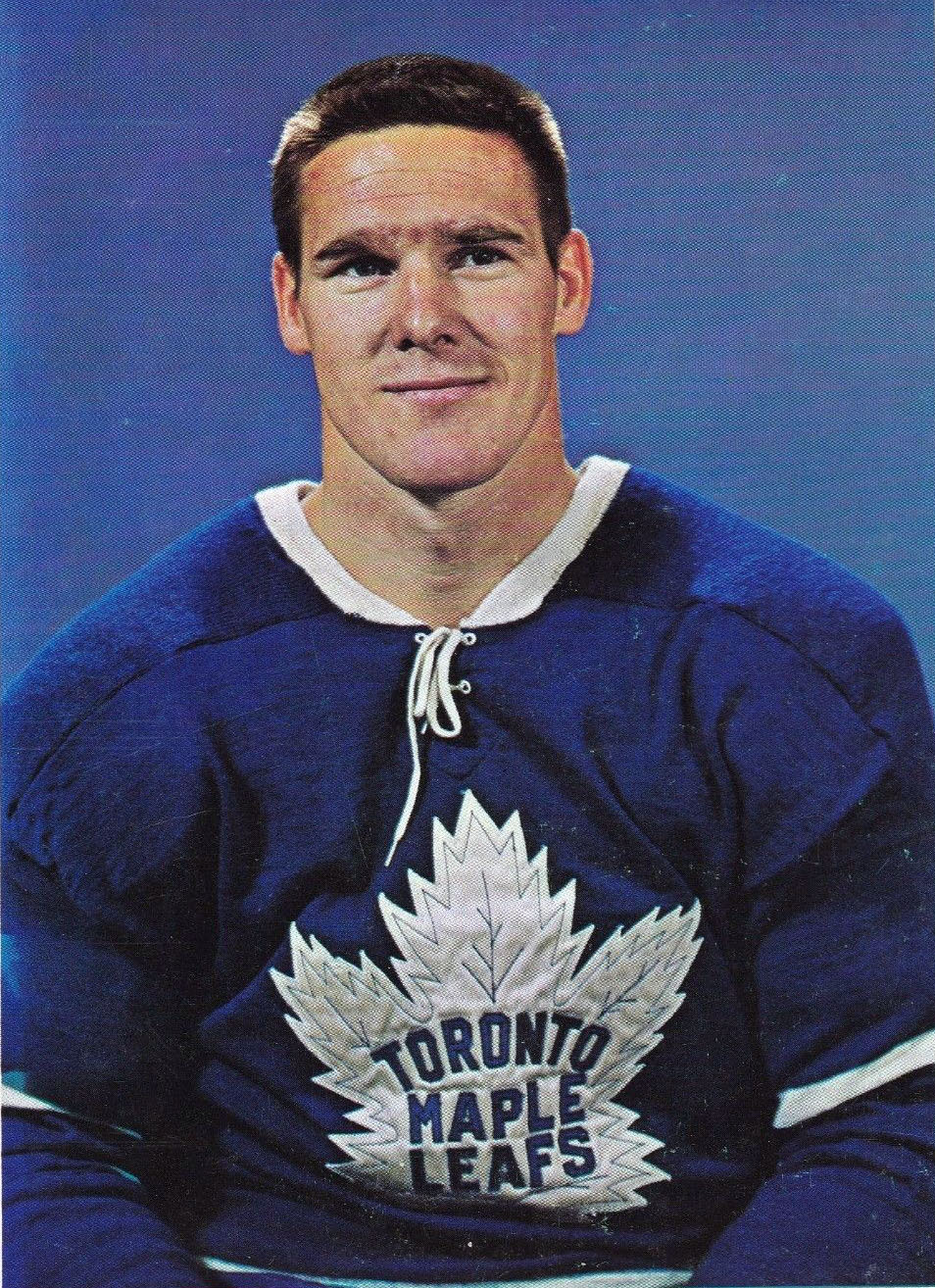
- Horton with the Toronto Maple Leafs, c. 1963
- Born: January 12, 1930 Cochrane, Ontario, Canada
- Died: February 21, 1974 (aged 44) St. Catharines, Ontario, Canada
- Height: 5 ft 10 in (178 cm)
- Weight: 180 lb (82 kg; 12 st 12 lb)
- Position: Defence
- Shot: Right
- Played for: Toronto Maple Leafs; New York Rangers; Pittsburgh Penguins; Buffalo Sabres
- Playing career: 1949–1974

Miles Gilbert "Tim" Horton (January 12, 1930 – February 21, 1974) was a Canadian professional ice hockey defenceman who played 24 seasons in the National Hockey League (NHL). He spent the majority of his career playing for the Toronto Maple Leafs, later playing with the New York Rangers, Pittsburgh Penguins, and Buffalo Sabres. Horton was a four-time Stanley Cup Champion in 1962, 1963, 1964, and 1967 with the Maple Leafs. In 2017, Horton was named one of the 100 Greatest NHL Players in history. He died at age 44 following a single-vehicle crash in which drugs and alcohol were involved.

A successful businessman, Horton co-founded the Tim Hortons restaurant chain.

== Early life ==
Horton was born in Cochrane, Ontario, at Lady Minto Hospital, to Aaron Oakley Horton, a Canadian National Railway mechanic, and Ethel May (née Irish). His father christened him Miles Gilbert after his two grandfathers, but he came to be known exclusively as Tim, the name his mother had wanted to give him. He had one brother, Jerry Horton.

The family moved in 1935 to Duparquet, Quebec, returning to Ontario in 1938 to Cochrane; the family then moved to Sudbury in 1945.

== Playing career ==
=== Early career ===
Horton grew up playing ice hockey in Cochrane, and later in a mining community near Timmins. In 1947, he moved to Toronto to play junior hockey for the St Michael's Majors. He was named best defenceman in the Ontario Hockey Association in the 1948-1949 season.

=== Toronto Maple Leafs ===
In 1949, he turned pro with the Maple Leafs farm team, the Pittsburgh Hornets of the American Hockey League. He spent most of the first three seasons with Pittsburgh, playing in his first NHL game on March 26, 1950. With the Hornets, he won the 1952 AHL championship and was named an American League All-Star. Horton played his first full season with the Toronto Maple Leafs in 1952. He remained a Leaf until 1970, winning four Stanley Cups.

In 1952, Horton's career was nearly ended after a bodycheck by Bill Gadsby broke his leg and fractured his jaw. He returned to play the next season.

Horton was known for his physical style and posture, and poise under pressure. As a hard-working and durable defenceman, he gained relatively few penalty minutes for an enforcer-type defenceman. He was also an effective puck carrier – in 1964–65 he played right wing for the Leafs. Horton appeared in seven National Hockey League All-Star Games. He was named an NHL first team All-Star three times: (1964, 1968, and 1969). He was selected to the NHL Second Team three times: (1954, 1963, 1967).

Between February 11, 1961, and February 4, 1968, Horton appeared in 486 consecutive regular season games; this remains the Leafs' club record for consecutive games and was the NHL record for consecutive games by a defenceman until broken by Kārlis Skrastiņš on February 8, 2007.

Horton had a reputation for enveloping players fighting him in a crushing bear hug.

While playing, Horton was generally acknowledged as the strongest man in the game; injuries and age were little more than minor inconveniences. Chicago Black Hawks left wing Bobby Hull declared, "There were defencemen you had to fear because they were vicious and would slam you into the boards from behind, for one, Eddie Shore. But you respected Tim Horton because he didn't need that type of intimidation. He used his tremendous strength and talent to keep you in check."

In 1962, Horton established a league postseason record for his position with 16 points (three goals, 13 assists), which Boston Bruins star Bobby Orr broke eight years later. The team record was tied in 1978 by Ian Turnbull (who played 13 games). It was broken in 1994, when David Ellett registered 18 points in 18 games.

=== Post-Toronto years ===
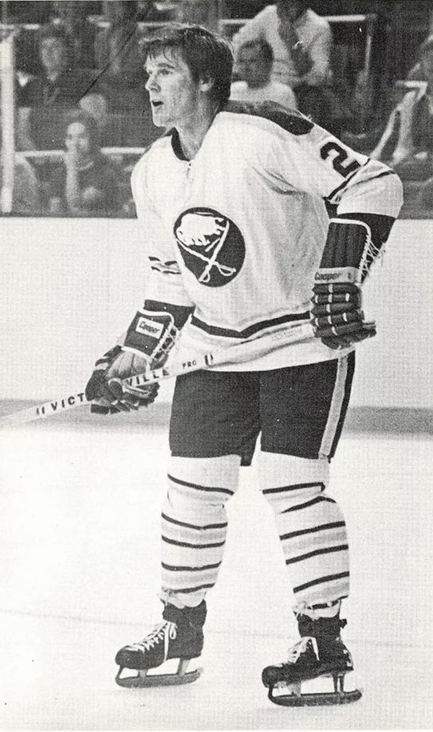
Horton in 1973 photo for Buffalo Sabres

In March 1970, the Maple Leafs traded Horton to the New York Rangers for future considerations; he spent the last fifteen games of the season in New York and all of the following as well. At the beginning of the 1971–72 season, he was claimed by the Pittsburgh Penguins in the intra-league draft and, at age 41, signed a one-year contract for an estimated $100,000, the largest contract at the time for the five-year-old franchise. With a broken ankle and a shoulder separation, Horton only played 44 games for the Penguins and managed just 11 points.

In spite of Horton's age, 42, and considerable nearsightedness, Buffalo Sabres head coach and general manager Punch Imlach, who had held the same posts with the Leafs for much of Horton's time in Toronto, acquired Horton in the intra-league draft and signed him in 1972. In 1973, his performance assisted the Sabres in their first playoff appearance. Horton later signed a contract extension in the off-season.

While playing for the Leafs, Horton wore the number 7, the same number worn by King Clancy from 1930 to 1937. The team declared both Horton and Clancy honoured players at a ceremony on November 21, 1995, but did not retire the number 7 from team use; despite this, it became an honoured jersey number, abiding by Leafs honours policy. In 2016, the Leafs changed their retirement policy and, on October 15, retired the number 7 in honour of both Horton and Clancy.

Horton wore number 2 in Buffalo (as Rick Martin already had the number 7). Both numbers have since been retired.

== Career statistics ==
=== Regular season and playoffs ===
			Regular season					Playoffs
Season	Team	League	GP	G	A	Pts	PIM	GP	G	A	Pts	PIM
1946–47	Copper Cliff Jr. Redmen	NOHA	9	0	0	0	14	5	0	1	1	0
1947–48	St. Michael's Majors	OHA	32	6	7	13	137	—	—	—	—	—
1948–49	St. Michael's Majors	OHA	32	9	18	27	95	—	—	—	—	—
1949–50	Toronto Maple Leafs	NHL	1	0	0	0	2	1	0	0	0	2
1949–50	Pittsburgh Hornets	AHL	60	5	18	23	83	—	—	—	—	—
1950–51	Pittsburgh Hornets	AHL	68	8	26	34	129	13	0	9	9	16
1951–52	Toronto Maple Leafs	NHL	4	0	0	0	8	—	—	—	—	—
1951–52	Pittsburgh Hornets	AHL	64	12	19	31	146	11	1	3	4	16
1952–53	Toronto Maple Leafs	NHL	70	2	14	16	85	—	—	—	—	—
1953–54	Toronto Maple Leafs	NHL	70	7	24	31	94	5	1	1	2	4
1954–55	Toronto Maple Leafs	NHL	67	5	9	14	84	—	—	—	—	—
1955–56	Toronto Maple Leafs	NHL	35	0	5	5	36	2	0	0	0	4
1956–57	Toronto Maple Leafs	NHL	66	6	19	25	72	—	—	—	—	—
1957–58	Toronto Maple Leafs	NHL	53	6	20	26	39	—	—	—	—	—
1958–59	Toronto Maple Leafs	NHL	70	5	21	26	76	12	0	3	3	16
1959–60	Toronto Maple Leafs	NHL	70	3	29	32	69	10	0	1	1	6
1960–61	Toronto Maple Leafs	NHL	57	6	15	21	75	5	0	0	0	0
1961–62	Toronto Maple Leafs	NHL	70	10	28	38	88	12	3	13	16	16
1962–63	Toronto Maple Leafs	NHL	70	6	19	25	69	10	1	3	4	10
1963–64	Toronto Maple Leafs	NHL	70	9	20	29	71	14	0	4	4	20
1964–65	Toronto Maple Leafs	NHL	70	12	16	28	95	6	0	2	2	13
1965–66	Toronto Maple Leafs	NHL	70	6	22	28	76	4	1	0	1	12
1966–67	Toronto Maple Leafs	NHL	70	8	17	25	70	12	3	5	8	25
1967–68	Toronto Maple Leafs	NHL	69	4	23	27	82	—	—	—	—	—
1968–69	Toronto Maple Leafs	NHL	74	11	29	40	107	4	0	0	0	7
1969–70	Toronto Maple Leafs	NHL	59	3	19	22	91	—	—	—	—	—
1969–70	New York Rangers	NHL	15	1	5	6	16	6	1	1	2	28
1970–71	New York Rangers	NHL	78	2	18	20	57	13	1	4	5	14
1971–72	Pittsburgh Penguins	NHL	44	2	9	11	40	4	0	1	1	2
1972–73	Buffalo Sabres	NHL	69	1	16	17	56	6	0	1	1	4
1973–74	Buffalo Sabres	NHL	55	0	6	6	53	—	—	—	—	—
NHL totals			1,446	115	403	518	1,611	126	11	39	50	183

== Donut industries ==
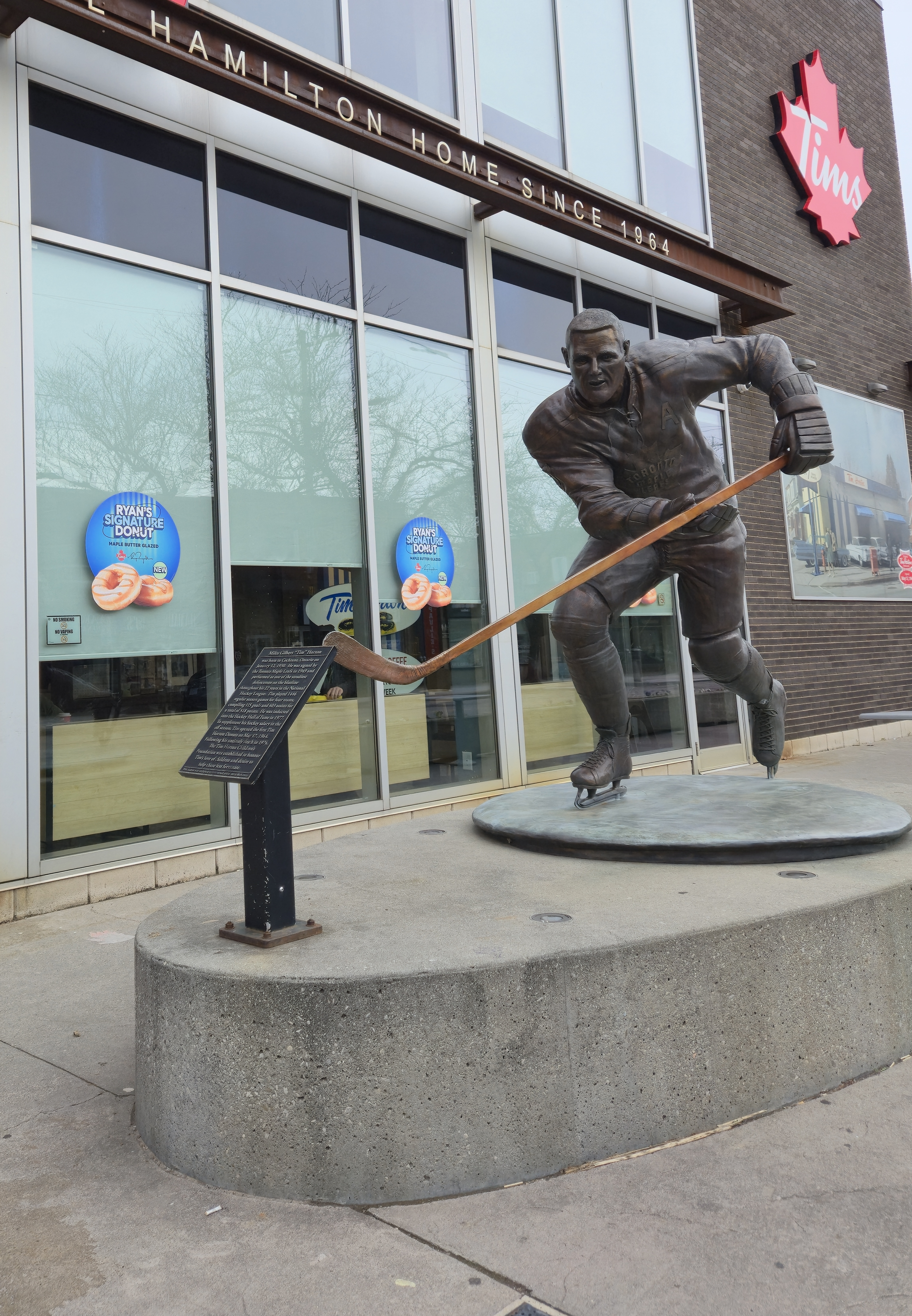
Statue of Horton outside original Tim Hortons store in Hamilton

In 1964, Horton opened his first Tim Horton Donut Shop in Hamilton, Ontario on Ottawa Street. He added a few of his culinary creations to the initial menu. By 1968, Tim Horton had become a multi-million dollar franchise system. Horton's previous business ventures included both a hamburger restaurant and Studebaker auto dealership in Toronto.

Upon Horton's death in 1974, his business partner Ron Joyce bought out the Horton family's shares for $1 million and took over as sole owner of the existing chain, which had 40 stores at the time, and later expanded to nearly 4,600 stores in Canada alone by 2013. Today, Tim Hortons is a flagship of Restaurant Brands International, a conglomerate that includes Burger King, Popeyes Louisiana Kitchen and Firehouse Subs.

Joyce's son, Ron Joyce Jr., is married to Horton's eldest daughter, Jeri-Lynn Horton-Joyce; until 2023, the couple owned a Tim Hortons franchise in Cobourg, Ontario.

== Death and aftermath ==
Horton died after losing control of his De Tomaso Pantera sports car on the Queen Elizabeth Way in St. Catharines, Ontario, in the early morning of February 21, 1974. He had played a game in Toronto the previous evening against his former team, the Maple Leafs, and was driving alone back to Buffalo, 160 kilometres (99 mi) south. The Sabres had lost the game, and despite sitting out the third period and playing with a jaw and ankle injury, Horton was selected one of the game's three stars.

Horton's Pantera had been given to him by Sabres' general manager Imlach as an enticement to return to the team for one more season.

On his drive to Buffalo, Horton stopped at his office in Oakville, and was met there by Ron Joyce. While there, Horton phoned his brother Gerry, who recognized that Tim had been drinking and tried to persuade him not to continue driving. Joyce also offered to have Horton stay with him. Horton chose to continue his drive to Buffalo.

After 4:00 a.m. EST (9:00 UTC), a woman reported to the Ontario Provincial Police in Burlington that she had observed a car travelling at high speed on the Queen Elizabeth Way. A warning was broadcast over police radio. Thirty minutes later, Officer Mike Gula observed a speeding vehicle travelling Niagara-bound on the Queen Elizabeth Way in Vineland. Gula activated his siren and attempted to pursue Horton's vehicle, but lost sight of it.

Horton passed a curve in the road at Ontario Street and was approaching the Lake Street exit in St. Catharines when he lost control and drove into the centre grass median, where his tire caught a recessed sewer which caused the car to flip several times before it came to a stop on its roof in the Toronto-bound lanes. Not wearing a seatbelt, Horton was found 123 feet (41 yd; 37 m) from the car. He was pronounced dead at St. Catharines General Hospital.

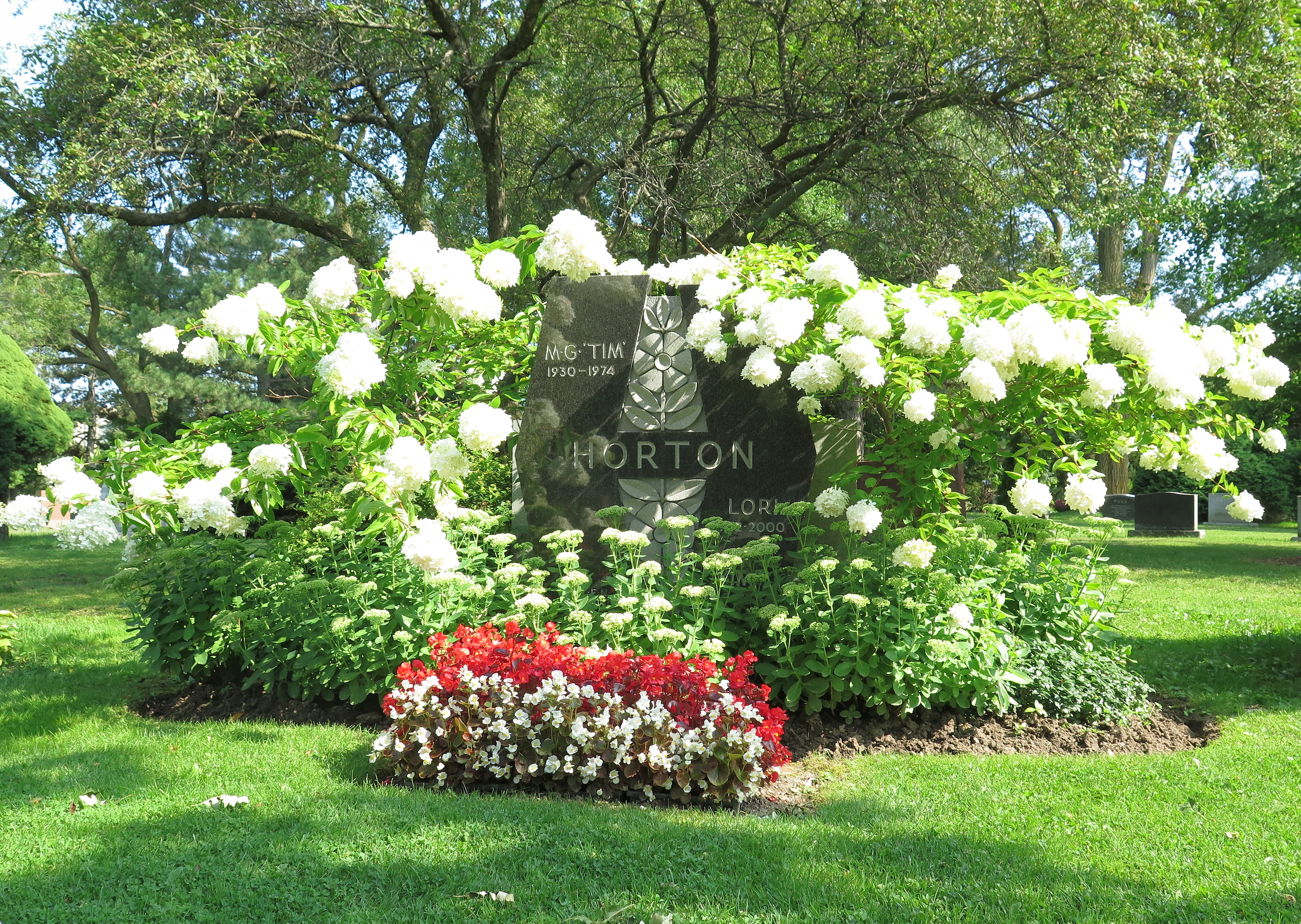
Graves of Tim and Lori Horton in York Cemetery, Toronto

Subsequent to Horton's death, there was no official public inquiry, and his autopsy was not made public. Police would not state whether Horton was intoxicated. In 2005, Horton's autopsy was made public (with witness statements redacted), and revealed that Horton's blood alcohol level was twice the legal limit, and that a half-filled vodka bottle was amongst the crash debris. Horton was also in possession of the drugs Dexedrine, a stimulant, and Dexamyl, a stimulant-sedative; traces of amobarbital, an ingredient in Dexamyl, were found in his blood. The autopsy report found no painkillers in Horton's body, and also concluded that his car had been in good working order. There was nothing to suggest Horton was evading police, or that police were near enough to initiate a criminal pursuit. Horton was interred at York Cemetery, Toronto. After Horton's death, he was inducted to the Hall Of Fame in 1977.

Following Horton's death, Ron Joyce offered Horton's widow Lori $1 million for her shares in the chain, which included 40 stores. She accepted his offer and Joyce became sole owner. Years later, Lori became dissatisfied with Joyce's offer, and filed a lawsuit against him. In 1993, Lori lost the lawsuit; an appeal was declined in 1995. She died in 2000 at age 68.

== Personal life ==
Married in 1952, Horton was survived by his wife, the late Lori Michalek of Pittsburgh, and four daughters. Horton was a Freemason, belonging to Kroy Lodge No. 676 in Thornhill, Ontario.

== Awards and achievements ==
- Named to NHL first All-Star team in 1964, 1968, and 1969
- Named to NHL second All-Star team in 1954, 1963, and 1967
- 4x Stanley Cup champion – 1962, 1963, 1964, 1967 (all with Toronto Maple Leafs)
- 1977 – inducted (posthumously) into the Hockey Hall of Fame
- 1982 – inducted (posthumously) into the Buffalo Sabres Hall of Fame
- 1996 – number 2 jersey retired by the Buffalo Sabres
- 1998 – ranked number 43 on The Hockey News list of the 100 Greatest Hockey Players
- 2002 – awarded the Order of Sport and inducted into Canada's Sports Hall of Fame
- 2004 – ranked number 59 in The Greatest Canadian list by the Canadian Broadcasting Corporation
- 2015 – recipient of the Bruce Prentice Legacy Award by the Ontario Sports Hall of Fame
- 2016 – number 7 jersey retired by the Toronto Maple Leafs
- In January 2017, Horton was part of the first group of players to be named one of the "100 Greatest NHL Players in history" by the league.

== See also ==
- List of ice hockey players who died during their playing career
- List of NHL players with 1,000 games played
