= Mrs. John Jacob Astor =

Mrs. John Jacob Astor may refer to:

- Sarah Todd Astor (1762–1842), wife of John Jacob Astor
- Charlotte Augusta Gibbes Astor (1825–1887), wife of John Jacob Astor III
- Madeleine Talmage Force (1893–1940), wife of John Jacob Astor IV
- Violet Astor, Baroness Astor of Hever (1889–1965), wife of John Jacob Astor, 1st Baron Astor of Hever
- One of several women married to John Jacob Astor VI
