= Amir Chand (independence activist) =

Indian educator and revolutionary (1869-1915)

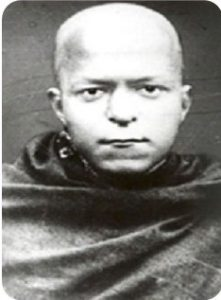
- Born: 1869; Delhi
- Died: 8 May 1915 (aged 45–46); Delhi
- Education: Teacher
- Known for: Independence activist
- Notable work: 1912 Delhi conspiracy case
- Movement: Indian Revolutionary Movement

Master Amir Chand (1869 – 8 May 1915) was an Indian educator and revolutionary associated with the early phase of the Indian independence movement. He was implicated in the 1912 assassination attempt on Lord Hardinge, the then Viceroy of India, and was executed for his role in the conspiracy.

== Early life and background ==
Amir Chand was born in 1869 in a Vaishya family in Delhi. He studied at St. Stephen's College, Delhi. By profession, Chand was a teacher. His sense of patriotism was so strong that during the Swadeshi Movement, he opened a Swadeshi store in the Hyderabad market, where he sold portraits of patriots and revolutionary literature. He also organized a Swadeshi exhibition in Delhi.

== Hardinge assassination attempt ==
On 23 December 1912, a bomb was thrown at Lord Hardinge by Basanta Kumar Biswas, during a ceremonial procession in Chandni Chowk, Delhi. The incident, later known as the Hardinge Bomb Case, marked a significant moment in India's revolutionary history. Chand was arrested and charged with conspiracy in connection with the attack.

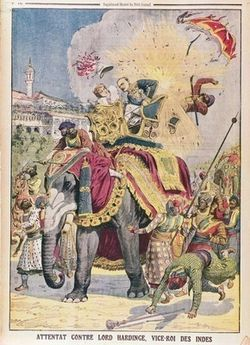
An illustration of the assassination attempt on Lord Charles Hardinge

Following a trial, he was sentenced to death and executed on 8 May 1915 at Delhi Jail, along with fellow revolutionaries Bhai Bal Mukund and Awadh Behari while another freedom fighter Basant Kumar Biswas was executed the next day in Ambala Central Jail. Their execution was widely noted in nationalist circles and contributed to the growing momentum of anti-colonial resistance.

Shaheed Smarak is a memorial located on the MAMC campus that remembers the unsung heroes of the freedom struggle.

== Execution site ==
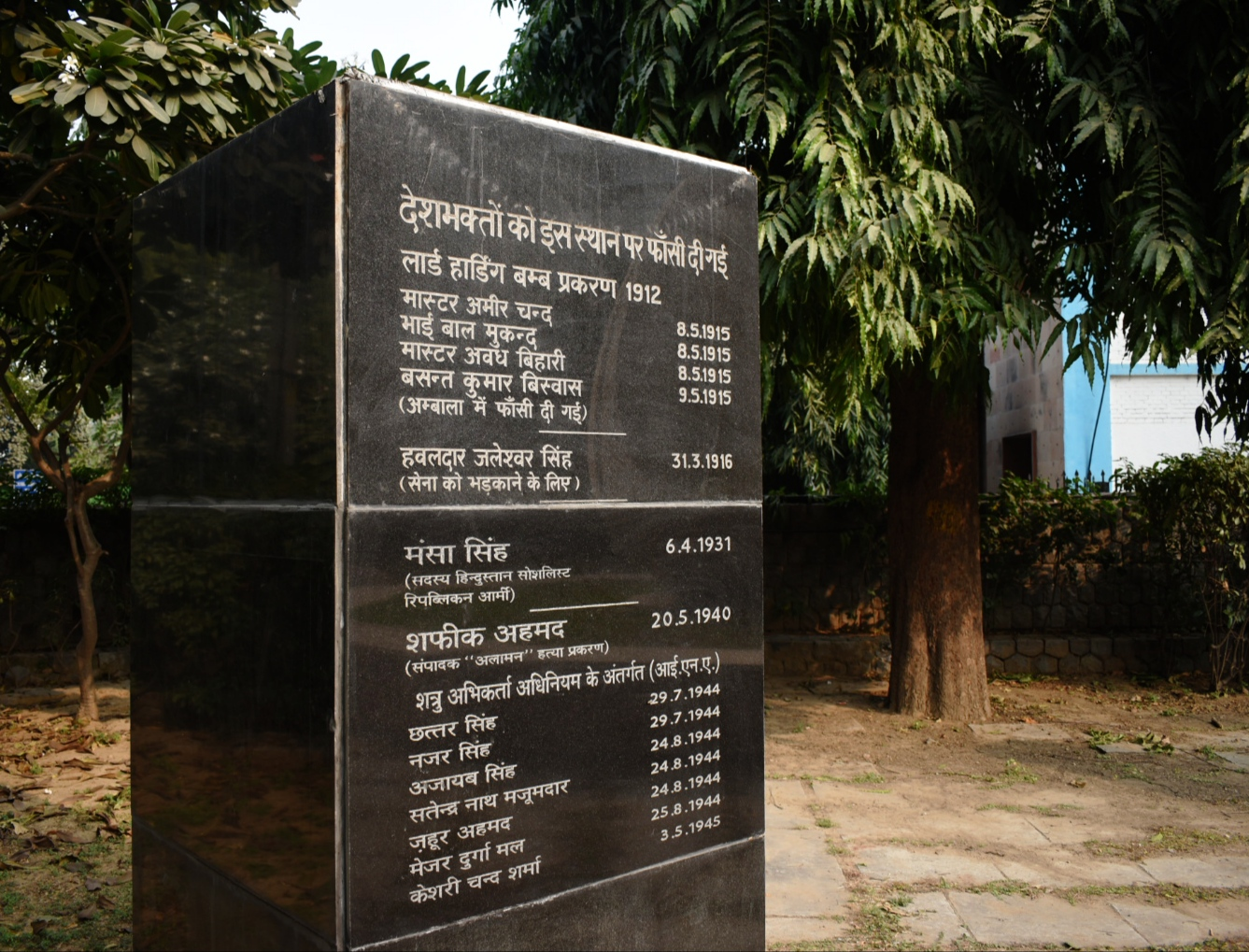
The place in Maulana Azad Medical College where freedom fighters were hanged

The Indian freedom movement was a movement that had the participation of every caste, class, and religion. Thousands of revolutionaries and freedom fighters fought for the dream of an Independent India.

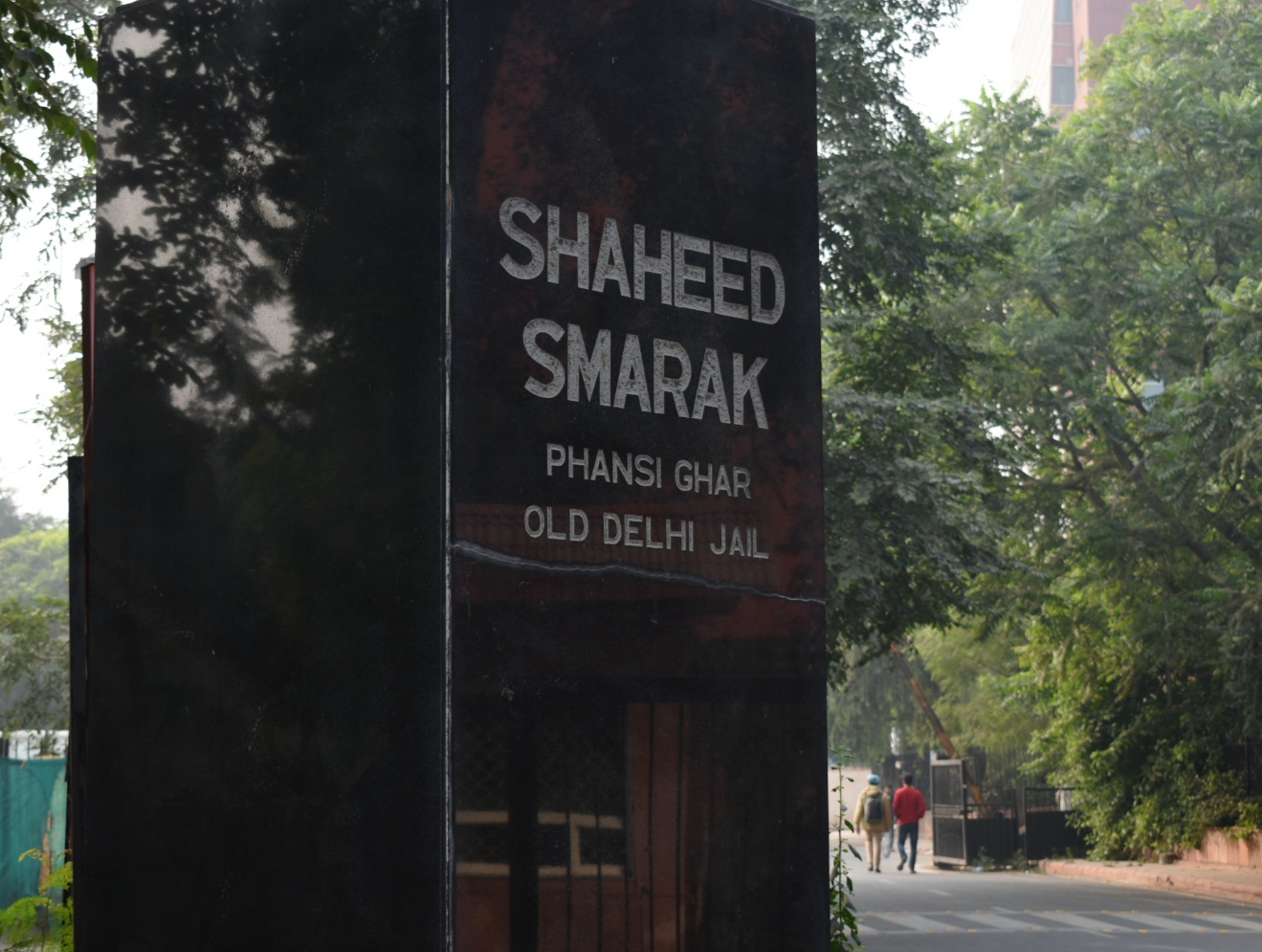
Shaheed Smarak - Phansi Ghar, Old Delhi (a memorial located on the MAMC campus that remembers the unsung heroes of the freedom struggle)

Shaheed Smarak is a memorial located on the MAMC campus that remembers the unsung heroes of the freedom struggle.

This was the place where many revolutionaries were hanged as the place served as the Phansi Ghar of Old Delhi jail.

== Legacy ==
Chand's legacy is preserved through educational institutions and publishing initiatives. His son, Sultan, went on to establish Sultan Chand and Sons, a prominent Indian publishing house focused on academic and educational materials. The Sultan Chand Foundation, founded in his memory, supports educational and cultural programs across India.
