= Lady Minto Hospital =

Hospital in Cochrane, Ontario, Canada

- MICs Group of Health Services

Geography
- Location: 241 Eighth Street, Cochrane, Ontario, Canada
- Coordinates: 49.0708°N 81.0219°W

Organization
- Care system: Medicare
- Type: Public

Services
- Beds: 33

History
- Former name: Cochrane General Hospital (1911–1915)
- Constructed: 1915
- Opened: 1916

Links
- Website: micsgroup.com/about-mics/lady-minto-hospital

Lady Minto Hospital is an acute care hospital in Cochrane, Ontario. It is part of the MICs Group of Health Services hospital system alongside Bingham Memorial Hospital and Anson General Hospital.

Founded in 1911, the hospital building was built in 1915 and opened in 1916. The hospital is named for Mary Caroline Grey, wife of Lord Minto (Gilbert Elliot-Murray-Kynynmound, 4th Earl of Minto), Governor General of Canada. The hospitals building funds were made available from the Lady Minto Hospital Fund given around 1900.

The main hospital has 33 beds and a long-term care facility with 33 beds. Services also include in-patient, out-patient, respite, palliative, emergency and ambulatory care.

== History ==
Lady Minto Hospital was one of 43 hospitals built from funds established by Lady Minto and the Victorian Order of Nurses.

The funds were given to build cottage hospitals in remote parts of Canada.

A timeline of Cochrane's Lady Minto Hospital:

- 1915-1916 first hospital building built
- 1953-1954 new hospital addition built to ease overcrowding at the 44-bed hospital
- 1960s renovations
- 1975-1978 new 64-bed hospital building built; old hospital building becomes Minto Health Centre
- 2003 new Minto Health Centre built; 2004 old hospital demolished

== Notable Patients ==
- Tim Horton - born at Lady Minto on January 12, 1930
