= Delhi conspiracy case =

1912 assassination attempt in British India

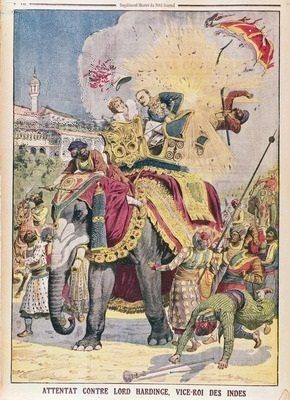
An illustration of the assassination attempt on Lord Charles Hardinge

The Delhi Conspiracy case, also known as the Delhi-Lahore Conspiracy, refers to an attempt made in 1912 to assassinate the then Viceroy of India, Lord Hardinge by throwing a local self-made bomb of Anushilan Samiti by Basanta Kumar Biswas, on the occasion of transferring the capital of British India from Calcutta to New Delhi. Hatched by the Indian revolutionaries underground in Bengal and Punjab and headed by Rash Behari Bose, the conspiracy culminated in the attempted assassination on 23 December 1912, when a homemade bomb was thrown into the Viceroy's howdah as the ceremonial procession was moving through the Chandni Chowk suburb of Delhi.

== Bomb thrown ==
The Viceroy and vicereine were sitting on an elephant and entering the city. Basanta Kumar Biswas, a revolutionary from Nadia village, threw a homemade bomb at the Viceroy who was seated on an elephant. Although injured in the attack, the Viceroy escaped with flesh wounds, but the servant behind him holding his parasol was killed. Lady Hardinge was unscathed; as was the elephant and its mahout (handler). Hardinge himself was injured all over the back, legs, and head by fragments of the bomb, the flesh on his shoulders being torn in strips. Viceroy and Vicerine were making their ceremonial entry to new capital of India, Delhi. The howdah in which they were travelling was blown into pieces and there was some difficulty to remove the Viceroy from the back of elephant on which they were travelling. The servant behind him was dead as observed by the Vicerine. The man killed was an umbrella bearer and he acted in that capacity to previous viceroy Lord Curzon also.

== Injuries to Viceroy ==
Viceroy Hardinge suffered several injuries due to piercing of screws filled in the bomb and they penetrated back and shoulders of Viceroy.

In the aftermath of the event, efforts were made to destroy the Bengali and Punjabi revolutionary underground, which came under intense pressure for some time. Rash Behari Bose, identified as the person who threw the bomb, successfully evaded capture for nearly three years, becoming involved in the Ghadar Conspiracy before it was uncovered, then fleeing to Japan in 1915.

== Aftermath ==
A reward of Rs.10,000 (approximately $3,300) was announced for the arrest of bomb thrower, since the identity of the assassin was not immediately known to Government agencies. The investigations in the aftermath of the assassination attempt led to the Delhi Conspiracy trial. The case was filed against Lala Hanumant Sahay, Basanta Kumar Biswas, Bhai Balmukund, Amir Chand and Awadh Behari. On 5 October 1914, Sahay was sentenced to life imprisonment in the Andaman Islands, and the other four were sentenced to death for their roles in the conspiracy. Basanta Kumar Biswas was hanged on 11 May 1915 at Ambala Central Jail in Punjab aged twenty and became one of the youngest people to be executed during the Indian revolutionary struggles during the 20th century.

== See also ==
- Rash Behari Bose
- Basanta Kumar Biswas
- Assassination of Richard Bourke, 6th Earl of Mayo

== Bibliography ==
- Gupta, Amit K. (1997), "Defying Death: Nationalist Revolutionism in India, 1897–1938", Social Scientist, 25 (9/10. (Sep.–Oct., 1997): 3–27, doi:10.2307/3517678, JSTOR 3517678
- Hopkirk, Peter (1997), Like Hidden Fire: The Plot to Bring Down the British Empire, Kodansha Globe, ISBN 1-56836-127-0
