= Basanta Kumar Biswas =

Indian independence activist (1895–1915)

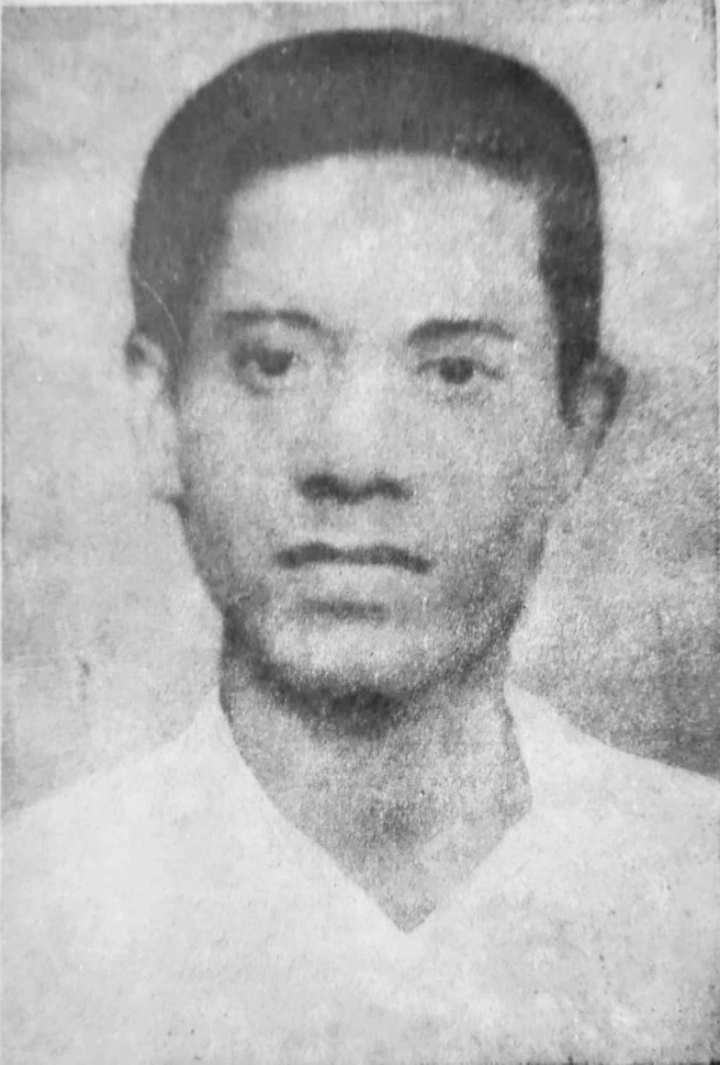
- Born: 6 February 1895; Poragacha, Nadia, Bengal Presidency, British Raj (now in West Bengal, India)
- Died: 11 May 1915 (aged 20); Ambala Central Jail, Ambala, Punjab, British Raj (now in Haryana, India)
- Organization: Jugantar
- Movement: Indian independence movement
- Relatives: Digambar Biswas (grand-uncle)
- Family: Zamindar Biswas family of Poragachha

Basanta Kumar Biswas (6 February 1895 – 11 May 1915) was an Indian revolutionary and pro-independence activist associated with the Jugantar group. In December 1912, he took part in the bombing of the Viceroy's procession during the Delhi conspiracy, targeting Lord Hardinge.

Biswas was among the prominent figures in the early revolutionary movement in Bengal and across India. Skilled in bomb-making, he was inducted into the revolutionary movement by Jugantar leaders Amarendranath Chatterjee and Rash Behari Bose.

== Early life ==
Basanta Kumar Biswas was born on 6 February 1895 at Poragacha village in a Bengali Hindu aristocratic Mahishya family of Nadia district of present day West Bengal, to Motilal Biswas and Kunjabala Devi. His ancestor (grand uncle), Digambar Biswas had gained fame as an active leader of the Indigo revolt (Nil Bidroha,1859) against the forced cultivation of the cash crop and freedom fighter Manmathanath Biswas was his cousin. He started his schooling in Srimanta M.I. School in nearby village of Madhabpur established by social reformer and industrialist Gagan Chandra Biswas, with his cousin Manmathnath Biswas.

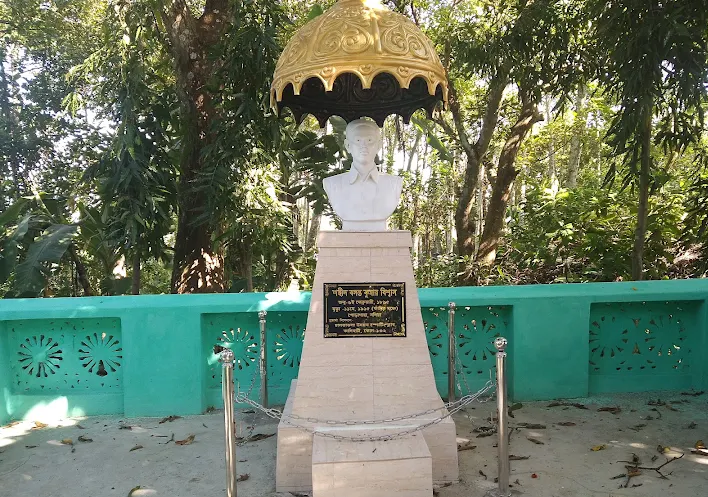
Memorial of Basanta Kumar Biswas near his birthplace in Poragacha, Nadia

In 1906, Basanta was moved to Muragacha school, where he studied upto Entrance examination. Under the guidance of Khirodh Chandra Ganguly, Head teacher of Muragacha school, Basanta started his journey of freedom fight. When he was a student of this School he took active part in the Swadeshi agitation at Poragachcha and its neighbourhood. In 1907, he left his studies and took up a job in 1910 at a swadeshi cloth store at Uttarpara, but left it for touring the different places of India. He went to Puri, and eventually went to Benaras, where he stayed at Ramakrishna Mission. Next year he met Rash Behari Bose in Dehradun and was recruited by him. Bose trained him in arms and bombs and lovingly often called him Bishe.

== Revolutionary activities ==
Basanta Kumar Biswas was a member of Jugantar group, known for his organisation skills and was an important intermediary between Calcutta office of Jugantar and the 'co-conspirators' in Chandannagar. After meeting Rash Behari Bose in Dehradun, he was politically indoctrinated and learnt practical trainings to carry out his mission. He was brought to Lahore by Bose in October 1912 and stayed there with his Punjabi associates. At Lahore he took the job of a compounder at a popular dispensary.

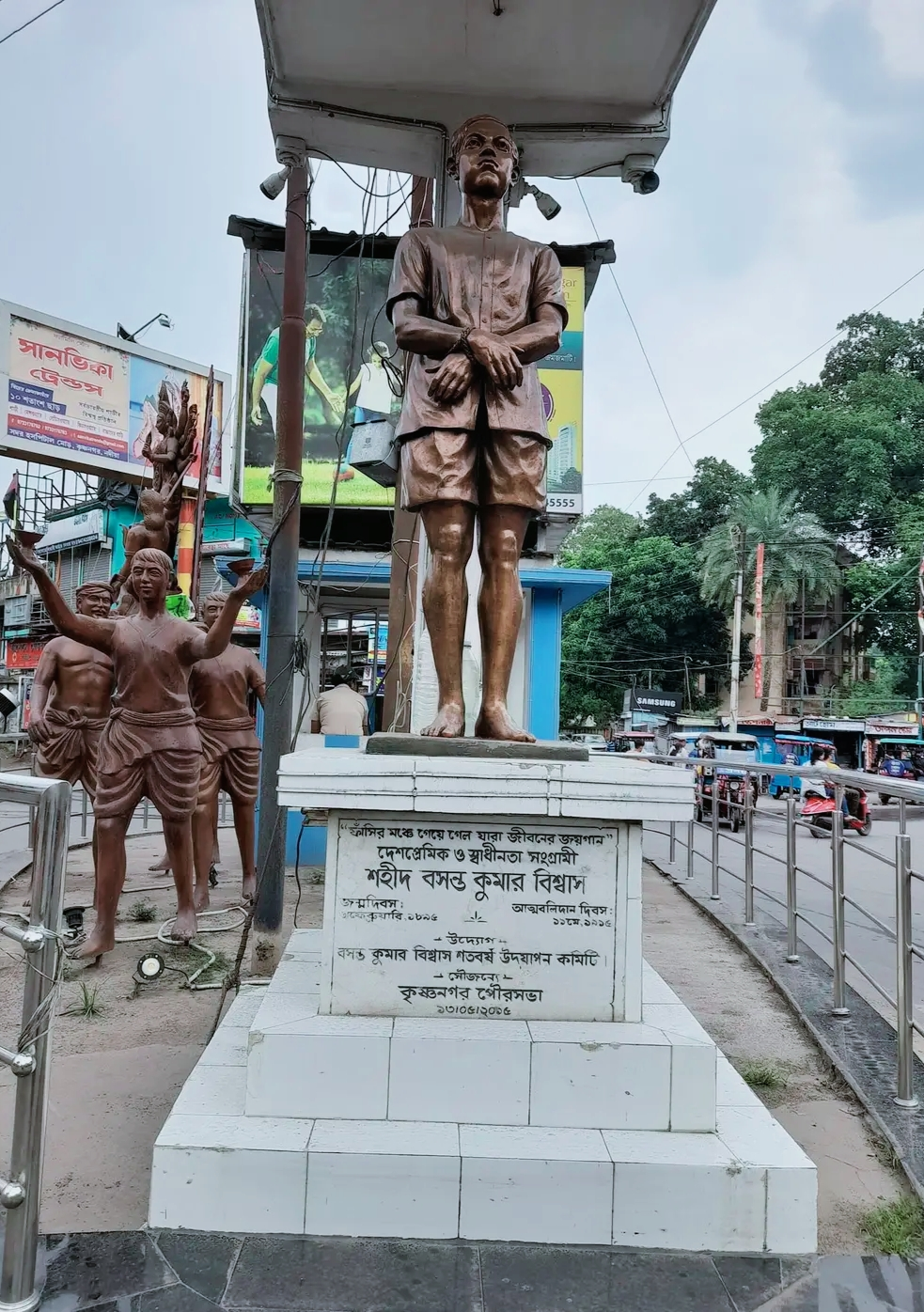
Statue of Shaheed Basanta Kumar Biswas in Krishnanagar, Nadia.

Biswas participated in the plot to throw a bomb on Lord Hardinge, the Viceroy of India. It was carried out by him on 23 December 1912, when Lord Hardinge was passing through Chandni Chowk, Delhi, in a state procession marking the inauguration of Delhi as the capital of India. Dressed in women's clothing, Basanta went to a rooftop overlooking viceroy's route reserved for ladies. He introduced himself to other spectators as Lakshmibai – an allusion to famous Rani of Jhansi. As the procession was passing by the rooftop, where Biswas was waiting, a bomb sailed down and exploded behind the viceroy. Hardinge was seriously injured, and the servant behind him holding his parasol was killed. As soon as his job was done Basanta dashed down to street and threw off his saree and disappeared into the crowd. He returned to Punjab where he carried on his revolutionary activities. The authors of the deed remained obscure for many months despite the state's intense investigation, and lucrative reward.

Biswas was arrested on 26 February 1914 at Poragachha, Nadia, betrayed by his own uncle when he had just finished performing the last rites for his father. He was also accused of throwing a bomb in the Lawrence Garden, Lahore, on 17 May 1913, in which a peon was killed. The trial, which came to be called the Delhi-Lahore Conspiracy Case, began on 23 May 1914 in Delhi; Amir Chand, Abadh Behari, and Bhai Balmukund, were condemned to death in the trial, and Basanta Biswas was found guilty but initially sentenced to life imprisonment as he was just seventeen years old.

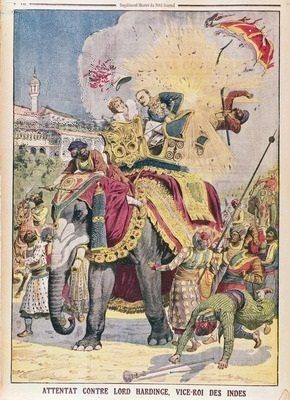
Assassination attempt on viceroy Hardinge by Biswas

An appeal was formulated at Lahore High Court. The Crown won its appeal and Biswas was sentenced to be hanged.

Basanta Kumar Biswas was hanged on 11 May 1915 at Ambala Central Jail in Punjab aged twenty and became one of the youngest people to be executed during the Indian revolutionary struggles during the 20th century.

== Legacy ==
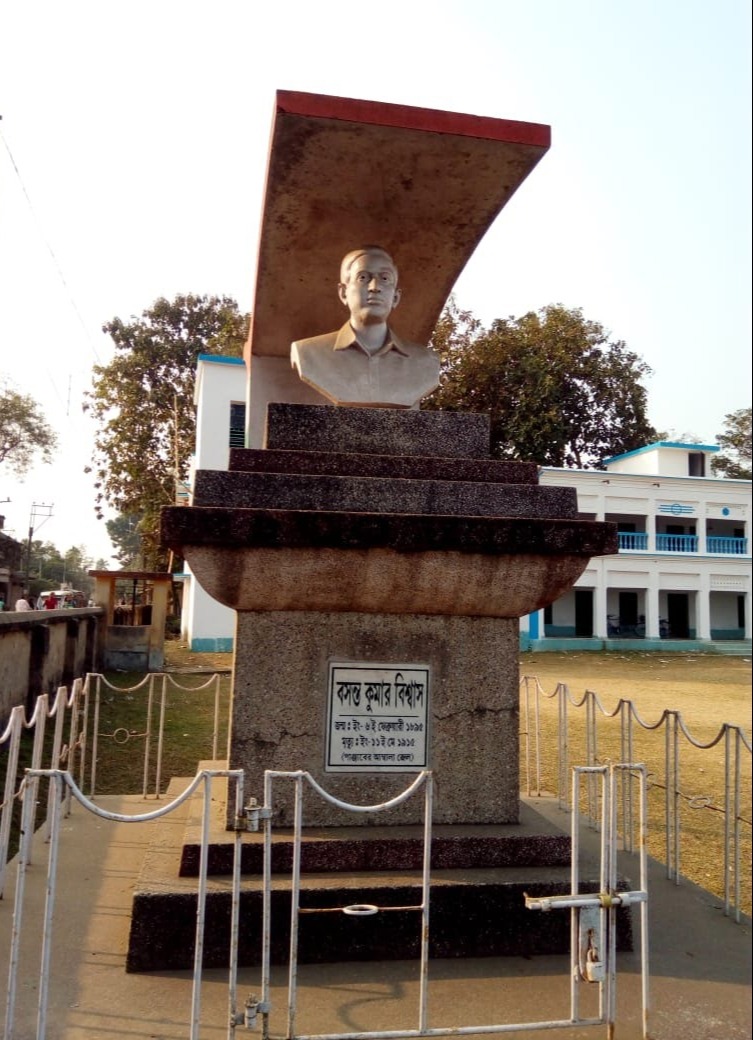
Statue of Basanta Biswas in a school in Nadia

There is a statue of Basanta Biswas established by Rasbihari Basu in a park of Tokyo, Japan. Another statue is situated in front of Rabindra Bhawan, Krishnanagar, Nadia. A school in civil lines, Delhi was named "Shaheed Basant Kumar Biswas Sarvodaya Vidhyalaya" in his memory. Although it was later renamed Rajkiya Pratibha Vikas Vidyalaya. Loka Sabha Speaker Meira Kumar has installed a photo of Basanta Kumar at the Museum of the Indian Parliament. Ujjal Biswas, an Indian politician and the former Minister in the Government of West Bengal belonged to the family of Basanta Biswas. The minister has been organising a three-day fair titled Basanta Mela at his village home in the month of February for the past 30 years.

He was featured in a brief role in the 2026 web series The Revolutionaries.

== See also ==
- Indian National Army
- Azad Hind
- Delhi conspiracy case
