= Digambar Biswas =

Bengali zamindar and rebel leader

Digambar Biswas was a local Zamindar and money lender. He was also one of the main leaders of the Blue Rebellion (1859–60) of Bengal. He, along with Bishnu Charan Biswas led the Indigo revolt of 1859, they mobilised exploited peasants against the oppressive Indigo cultivators of the British Raj, eventually resulting in an improvement of the living conditions of the peasants. For this, they are well known in the district of Nadia. He was the paternal grandfather of famous revolutionary and martyr Basanta Kumar Biswas.

== Early life ==
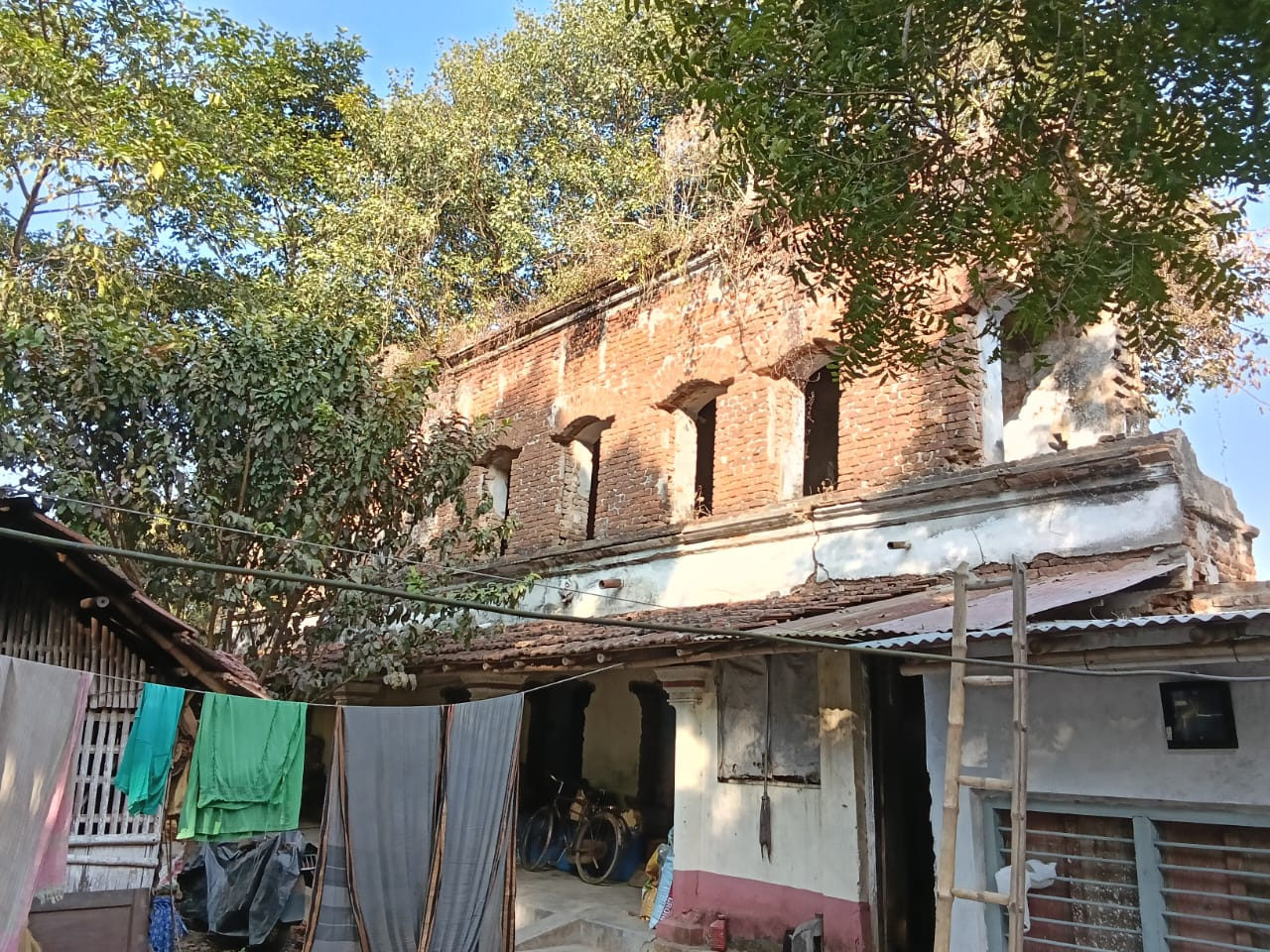
House built by Digambar Biswas in his native village of Poragachha, Nadia district. Biswas was the foremost leader of the Indigo revolt. This house was built by him, now maintained by his descendants. This house was one of the centres of the Indigo revolt, where the rebels used to meet to discuss strategy of the rebellion. This also being the birthplace of revolutionaries Basanta Kumar Biswas and Manmatha Biswas of the same family.

Digambar Biswas was born sometime in the early 19th century, in the village of Poragacha, in Nadia district in a Bengali Hindu Mahishya family to Kalchandra Biswas. An ancestor of the family, Ghanashyam, the great great great grandfather of Digambar, had migrated from Mahmudpur village in Jessore District to Poragachha in Nadia district on the invitation of the Nadia Raj. Their family was one of the few families to be bestowed the title of "Biswas" by the Nawabs of Bengal. The Biswases of Poragachha were the Jotedars of the area and hence had a close and personal relationship with the peasants of the neighbouring area. Digambar Biswas and another leader, Bishnu Charan Biswas, of Chaugachha village worked as Dewans of Neelkuthi in their early lives. The Biswases of Chaugachha were related to the Biswases of Poragachha by marriage.

== The revolt ==
Digambar Biswas resigned from his civil service post and started organizing the rebel farmers against the indigo farmers. The rebels did not know how to use weapons, so, he spent his money to bring batons from Barisal and teach the indigo farmers how to use spears and batons, and formed a resistance force. Under his leadership, the indigo rebellion took place across a vast area of Nadia and Jessore districts. Both Digambar and Bishnu Charan spent 17 thousand Mohur during that period to help the farmers and lost everything. It is proven that they considered the interests of the poor farmers as their own interests. In the words of historian Satish Mitra, "The Biswas had some cohesion, but they spent everything they had on this movement. The indigo farmers were furious to break the alliance of the peasants. The Biswas brought sticks from Barisal and beat the countrymen with sticks...". In the history of the peasant revolt in India, Digambar Biswas, is remembered as the main leader of the Indigo Rebellion, and as a visionary.

== Aftermath ==
Despite the rebellion gaining huge fame and popularity, there were several harsh consequences endured by the leaders and their families. Digambar Biswas's own village, Poragachha, was attacked multiple times, but he was able to acquire a substantial number of lathiyals to protect it. To enlist more peasants to his cause he paid their debts to the planters, spending enormous sum of 17,000 rupees. Digambar received patronage and protection from a Zamindar of Ranaghat, Srigopal Pal Chowdhury. He continued to lead the peasants in presenting petitions and organizing resistance. Eventually, his funds were exhausted and he died a poor man.

== Family tree ==
Ghanashyam Biswas
  - Moniram Biswas
    - Bhriguram Biswas
      - Ramhari Biswas
        - Kalchandra Biswas
          - Sarbananda Biswas
            - Motilal, m. Kunjabala Debi
              - Hemchandra
              - Kamakshya
              - Basanta Kumar Biswas
              - Durga
            - Hiralal
            - Pratap Chandra
              - Ashutosh
              - Khagendranath
              - Nripendranath
          - Digambar Biswas
            - Nilkantha
            - Rudrakantha
            - Mokshada
            - Surodhoni, m. Prankrishna Sarkar
          - Ramgopal Biswas
            - Jadunath, m. Pranmoyi Debi
              - Satyaranjan
              - Jitendra
              - Manmathanath Biswas
            - Bidhu Bhusan
            - Dinanath
