= Bhai Balmukund =

Indian revolutionary freedom fighter

Bhai Balmukund (1889 – 8 May 1915) was an Indian revolutionary freedom fighter. He was sentenced to death and hanged by the British Raj for his role in Delhi conspiracy case. He was a cousin of another revolutionary Bhai Parmanand, who was a founder member of Ghadar Party.

== Early life ==
Bhai Balmukund was born in 1889 at Kariala village in Jhelum district (now in Pakistan). His father was Bhai Mathura Das. His family hailed from a famous martyr of Hindu history Bhai Mati Das from whom they attached the epithet Bhai to their names. Balmukund's interest in national movement aroused when he was a student. After graduation, he took the profession of teaching, but his attachments to the national movement made him an ardent nationalist.

== Revolutionary activities ==
On 23 December 1912, when Lord Hardinge was marching in a state through the Chandni Chowk, Delhi, a bomb was thrown on him, by Basanta Kumar Biswas. The Viceroy received minor injuries only, but his attendant was killed. Another bomb was thrown at some Europeans at Lawrence Garden, Lahore five months later on 17 May 1913. Following investigations, Balmukund was arrested from Jodhpur, where he was working as a tutor of the Jodhpur Maharaja's sons.

== Death ==
A trial was held at Delhi after the investigations of the bombings and Bal Mukund was sentenced to death along with his companions Master Amir Chand, Awadh Behari, and Basanta Kumar Biswas on 8 December 1914. On 11 May 1915, Bal Mukund was hanged in the Ambala Central Jail at 32 years of age.

== Bibliography ==
- Sarala, Shrikrishna (1999). Indian revolutionaries: a comprehensive study, 1757-1961. Vol. II. Prabhat Prakashan. pp. 221–224. ISBN 9788187100171.
- Bhai Parmanand (2009). The Story of My Life. Prabhat Prakashan. ISBN 978-81-87100-38-6.
