= Gandhi's Assassin =

Biographical book by Dhirendra K. Jha

Gandhi's Assassin: The Making of Nathuram Godse and His Idea of India is a biographical book by Dhirendra K. Jha which was published on January 24, 2023, by Verso Books.

== Critical reception ==
Samrat Choudhury of Hindustan Times wrote "Deeply researched and lucidly written, Gandhi’s Assassin does a good job in its portraiture of Nathuram Godse and in reporting details of the plot to kill MK Gandhi". Saurabh Sharma of News9Live wrote "It is far more interesting and revealing than any other account of history."

The book has been also reviewed by Argha Kr Banerjee of The Telegraph India and Anand K. Sahay of Deccan Chronicle.
