= Alec Hardinge, 2nd Baron Hardinge of Penshurst =

British Private Secretary in World War II

Major The Right Honourable The Lord Hardinge of Penshurst GCB GCVO MC PC
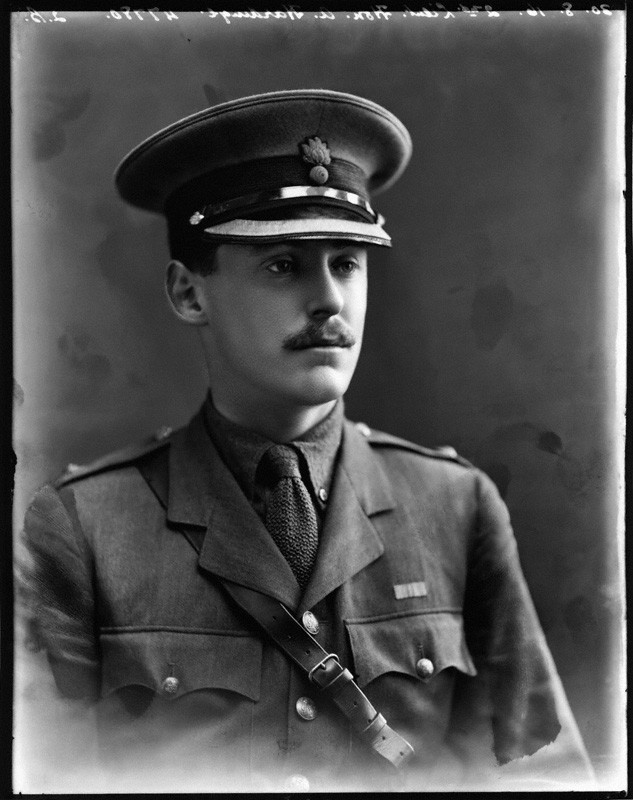
- Hardinge in 1916

Private Secretary to the Sovereign
- In office 1936–1943
- Monarchs: Edward VIII (1936); George VI (1936–1943)
- Preceded by: The Lord Wigram
- Succeeded by: Sir Alan Lascelles

Personal details
- Born: 17 May 1894
- Died: 29 May 1960 (aged 66)
- Parent(s): Charles Hardinge, 1st Baron Hardinge of Penshurst; Winifred Sturt
- Education: Harrow School
- Alma mater: Trinity College, Cambridge

Major Alexander Henry Louis Hardinge, 2nd Baron Hardinge of Penshurst, GCB, GCVO, MC, PC (17 May 1894 – 29 May 1960) was Private Secretary to the Sovereign during the Abdication Crisis of Edward VIII and during most of the Second World War.

== Background and earlier life ==
Hardinge was born in 1894, the son of Charles Hardinge (who was created Baron Hardinge of Penshurst in 1910 and served as Viceroy of India from 1910 to 1916).

Hardinge was educated at Harrow School and Trinity College, Cambridge.

He was commissioned into the Grenadier Guards and fought in the First World War and became a Lieutenant and received the Military Cross. He was Aide-de-Camp to the Viceroy of India (his father) between 1915 and 1916. In 1920, he became Assistant Private Secretary to George V and was promoted Captain. On 8 February 1921, he married Helen Gascoyne-Cecil (a daughter of Lord Edward Gascoyne-Cecil) and they had three children. In 1929 he was promoted Major.

Hardinge served as Assistant Private Secretary until George V's death in January 1936.

== Private Secretary to Edward VIII and George VI ==
He was promoted to Private Secretary upon the accession of Edward VIII that same year, contributing to some delicate negotiations between the new king and the British government in the run up to the king's abdication in December 1936; he continued in this role under George VI until his early retirement in 1943. Alan Lascelles, the Assistant Private Secretary, effected the forced resignation of Hardinge and took over as Private Secretary.

Significantly, as Brandi McCarry's commentary has pointed out, Hardinge's ultimate loyalty lay with the King-in-Parliament rather than personally with a monarch in conflict (and especially when the conflict was between the Sovereign and "his" Parliament). This was particularly reflected in Hardinge's warning letter to Edward, received on 13 November 1936, which showed evidence of prior consultation with Prime Minister Stanley Baldwin, who, with his cabinet, had serious misgivings about the suitability of Mrs Wallis Simpson as the possible spouse of the monarch. The precise nature and extent of his loyalty were thus constitutional—doing what he thought was right in his post as Private Secretary to the Sovereign.

== Death and legacy ==
Hardinge died in 1960 and his title was inherited by his son, George.

His wife Helen wrote his biography Loyal to Three Kings, William Kimber, London 1967.

Court offices
Preceded by The Earl of Cromer	Assistant Private Secretary to the Sovereign; 1920–1936	Succeeded by Godfrey Thomas
Preceded by Clive Wigram	Private Secretary to the Sovereign; 1936–1943	Succeeded by Alan Lascelles
Peerage of the United Kingdom
Preceded by Charles Hardinge	Baron Hardinge of Penshurst; 1944–1960	Succeeded by George Hardinge
