= Baron Hardinge of Penshurst =

Barony in the Peerage of the United Kingdom

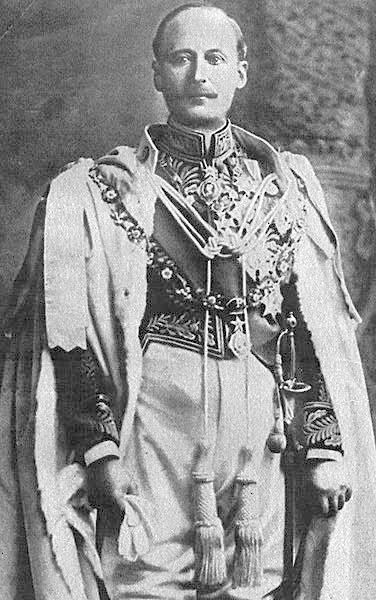
Charles Hardinge, 1st Baron Hardinge of Penshurst

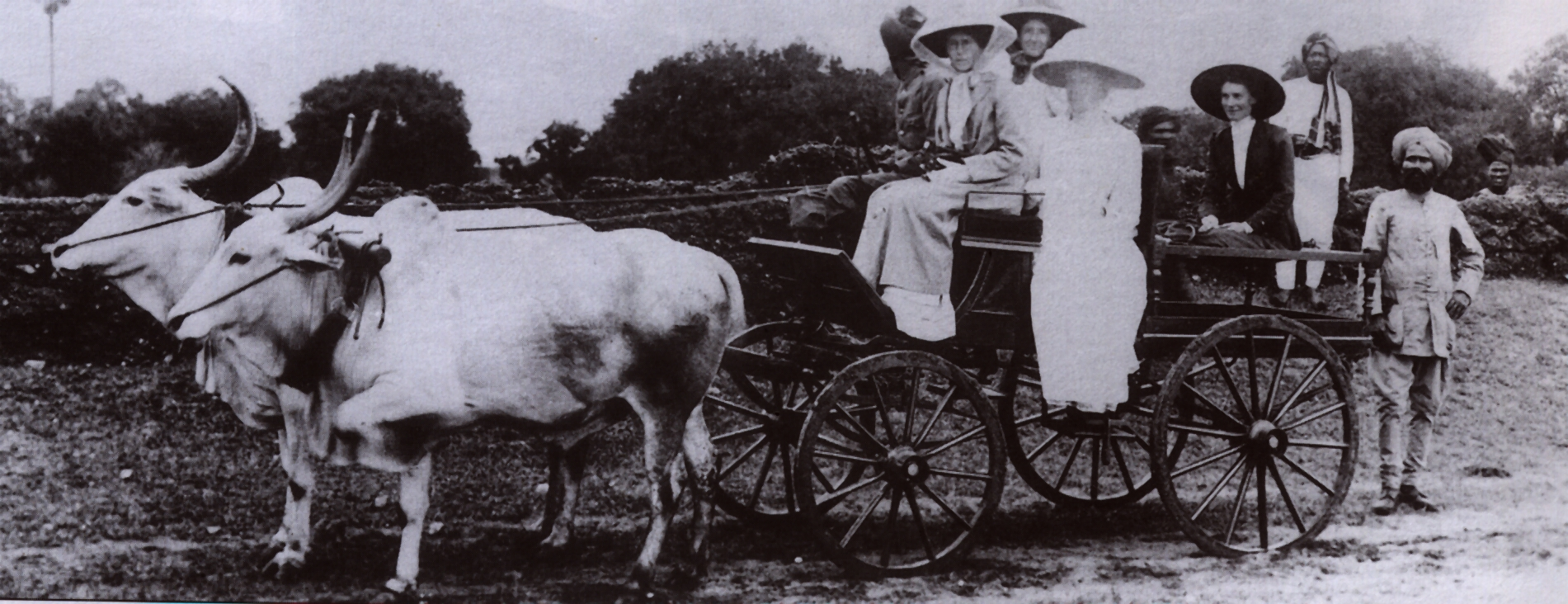
Hardinge family members in ox-cart in Hyderabad State (1911, attending the coronation of Asaf Jah VII)

Baron Hardinge of Penshurst, in the County of Kent, is a title in the Peerage of the United Kingdom. It was created in 1910 for the diplomat the Hon. Sir Charles Hardinge, Viceroy and Governor-General of India from 1910 to 1916. He was the second son of Charles Hardinge, 2nd Viscount Hardinge. His son, the second Baron, served as private secretary to both King Edward VIII and King George VI.

As of 2014 the title is held by the latter's grandson, the fourth Baron, who succeeded his father in 1997.

== Barons Hardinge of Penshurst (1910) ==
- Charles Hardinge, 1st Baron Hardinge of Penshurst (1858–1944)
- Alexander Henry Louis Hardinge, 2nd Baron Hardinge of Penshurst (1894–1960)
- George Edward Charles Hardinge, 3rd Baron Hardinge of Penshurst (1921–1997)
- Julian Alexander Hardinge, 4th Baron Hardinge of Penshurst (b. 1945)

The heir presumptive is the present holder's brother, Hon. Hugh Francis Hardinge (b. 1948).

== See also ==
- Hardinge Bridge
- Viscount Hardinge
- Penshurst
