= List of prisons in Haryana =

There are 21 prisons in Haryana state of India, spread over 18 of its districts.

As of 1 May 2021, there were 21,612 prisoners in the jails of Haryana, against the total capacity of 20,293. The current Director General of Prisons in Haryana is Alok Kumar Roy, IPS.

== List of prisons ==
List of Prisons in Haryana
Sr. No.	District	Established	Rated capacity	Current population
1.	Central Jail, Ambala	1872	1228	1256
2.	District Jail, Bhiwani	1978	561	621
3.	Faridabad		2500	2527
4.	Gurgaon		2412	2748
5.	Central Jail-I, Hisar		1499	1717
6.	Central Jail-II, Hisar		571	779
7.	Jhajjar	2011	1074	1183
8.	Jind		669	928
9.	Kaithal		515	664
10.	Karnal		2434+150	1738+37
11.	Kurukshetra		446	697
12.	Narnaul		350	508
13.	Palwal		60	31
14.	Panipat		870	1125
15.	Rewari	1970	65+378	43+340
16.	Rohtak		1300	1557
17.	Sirsa		807	1006
18.	Sonepat		745	1120
19.	Yamunanagar		1200	844

== See also ==
- Haryana Police
- Police divisions and ranges in Haryana
- Prisons in India
