= Charles Hardinge, 1st Baron Hardinge of Penshurst =

British diplomat and Viceroy of India (1858–1944)

His Excellency The Right Honourable The Lord Hardinge of Penshurst KG GCB GCSI GCMG GCIE GCVO ISO PC
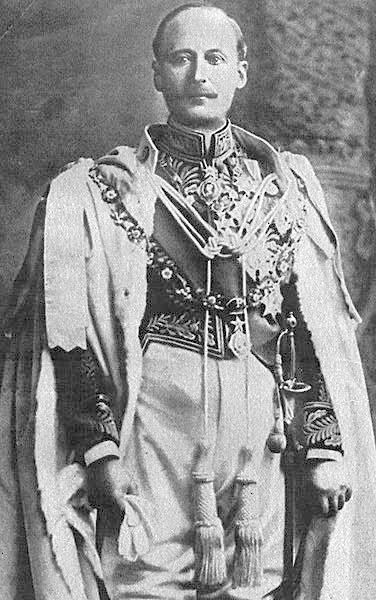

Viceroy and Governor-General of India
- In office 23 November 1910 – 4 April 1916
- Monarch: George V
- Preceded by: The Earl of Minto
- Succeeded by: The Lord Chelmsford

Personal details
- Born: 20 June 1858
- Died: 2 August 1944 (aged 86) Penshurst, Kent, England
- Spouse: Winifred Sturt (m. 1890, died 1914)
- Children: 3
- Parent: Charles Hardinge, 2nd Viscount Hardinge (father)
- Education: Trinity College, Cambridge

Charles Hardinge, 1st Baron Hardinge of Penshurst, (20 June 1858 – 2 August 1944) was a British diplomat and statesman who served as Viceroy and Governor-General of India from 1910 to 1916.

== Background and education ==
Hardinge was the second son of Charles Hardinge, 2nd Viscount Hardinge, and the grandson of Henry Hardinge, 1st Viscount Hardinge, a former Governor-General of India. He was educated Cheam School, Harrow School and at Trinity College, Cambridge.

== Career ==
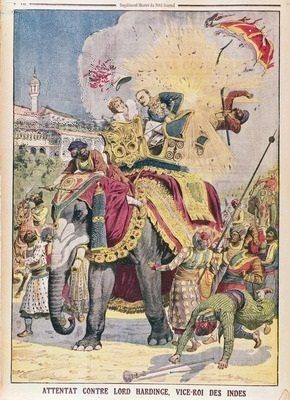
1912 assassination attempt on Lord Hardinge.

Hardinge entered the diplomatic service in 1880, and was attached to the embassy in Constantinople, where he was private secretary to the ambassador Lord Dufferin. Afterwards he transferred successively to Berlin, Washington (where he was acting chargé d′affairs) for a time), Sofia and Constantinople again. As chargé d′affairs in Bucharest he was involved in negotiating a treaty and a trade marks convention between the United Kingdom and the Kingdom of Romania. In 1893 he transferred to Paris, and in 1895 he was appointed a Companion of the Order of the Bath (CB). He was appointed the first secretary at Tehran in 1896, and the first secretary at Saint Petersburg in 1898, when he was promoted over the heads of seventeen of his seniors. While in the Russian Empire, he acted several times as chargé d'affaires in the ambassador's absence (including in late 1902). In early 1903, he was called back home and appointed Assistant Under-Secretary for Foreign Affairs at the Foreign Office. He was appointed Ambassador to Russia in March 1904.

In 1906 Hardinge was again recalled and promoted to the position of Permanent Under-Secretary at the Foreign Office, where despite his own conservatism, he worked closely with Liberal Foreign Secretary Sir Edward Grey. In 1907, he declined the post of Ambassador to the United States. In 1910, Hardinge was raised to the peerage as Baron Hardinge of Penshurst, in the County of Kent, and appointed by the Asquith government as Viceroy of India.

His tenure was a memorable one and included the visit of King George V and the Delhi Durbar of 1911, as well as the move of the capital from Calcutta to New Delhi in 1911. Although Hardinge was the target of assassination attempts with bomb attacks by the Indian nationalists such as Rash Behari Bose, Basanta Kumar Biswas and Sachin Sanyal, his tenure included an improvement of relations between the British administration and the nationalists, as a consequence of the implementation of the Morley-Minto reforms of 1909, and of Hardinge's own admiration for Mohandas Gandhi and criticism of the Union of South Africa's anti-Indian immigration policies.. Hardinge founded the Dhamrai Hardinge High School and College in 1914. The Hardinge Railway Bridge, now in Bangladesh, was constructed and inaugurated (1915) in his tenure. It has continued to serve a crucial a role in the country's railway network.

Hardinge's efforts paid off in 1914 during the First World War. Improved colonial relationships allowed Britain to deploy nearly all of the British troops in India as well as many native Indian troops to areas outside India. In particular, the British Indian Army played a significant (though initially mismanaged) role in the Mesopotamian campaign.

While Hardinge's subsequent career was not unduly affected, the early bureaucratic and military incompetence which led to the surrender and subsequent suffering of a British Empire army at Kut-al-Amara was attributed in part to being his responsibility. He is believed to have been one of the "idle-minded overlings who quibbled while they died" scathingly attacked in Rudyard Kipling's poem "Mesopotamia".

In 1916, Hardinge returned to his former post in England as Permanent Under-Secretary at the Foreign Office, serving with Arthur Balfour. At the Paris Peace Conference of 1919, he served as the British Empire Delegation's Administrative Director Charged with the Internal Organization of the Missions Composing the Delegation. In 1920, he became ambassador to France before his retirement in 1922.

== Honours ==
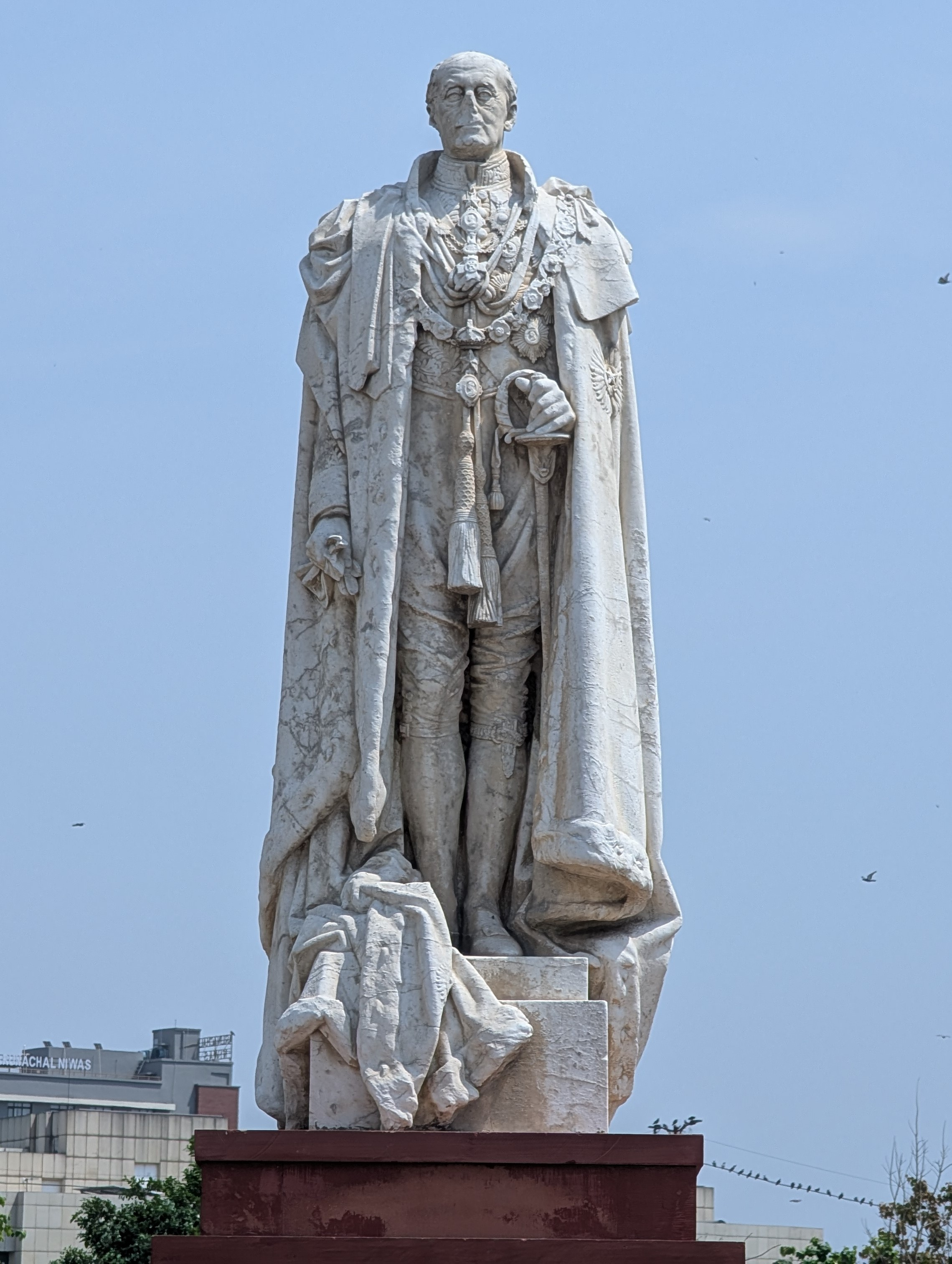
Statue of Lord Hardinge at Coronation Park, Delhi

As well as the distinction of being awarded six British knighthoods, he also gained foreign awards:

- Knight of Grace of Order of St. John of Jerusalem in England.
- Grand officer in the Legion of Honour, from France.
- Grand cross of the Crown of Italy.
- Order of the Immaculate Conception of Vila Viçosa, from Portugal.
- Order of the Redeemer, from Greece.
- Order of Charles III, from Spain.
- Order of St. Olav, from Norway.
- Order of Alexander Nevsky, from Russia.
- Order of the Dannebrog, from Denmark.
- Order of Vasa, from Sweden.

== Personal life ==
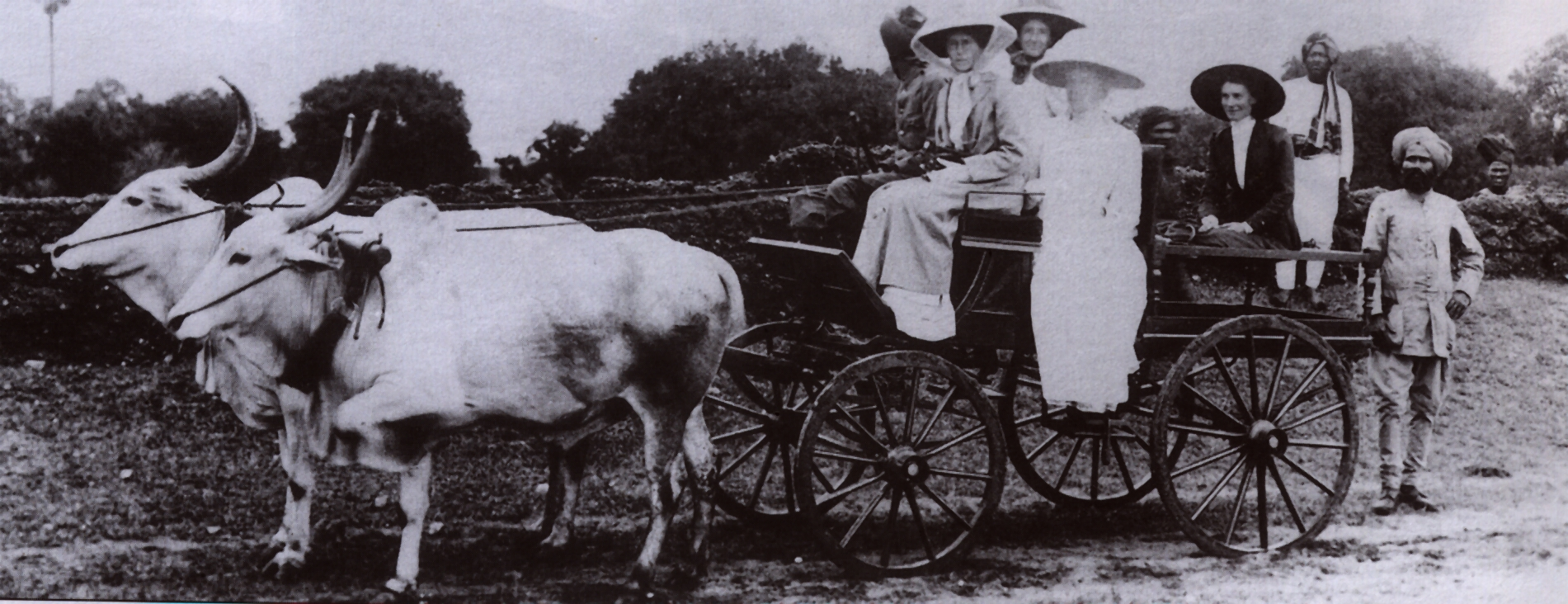
Hardinge family members in ox-cart in Hyderabad State (1911, attending the coronation of Asaf Jah VII)

He married his first cousin Winifred Selina Sturt on 17 April 1890, over the objections of her family, due to the couple's consanguinity and Hardinge's financial status. She was the second daughter of Henry Gerard Sturt, first Baron Alington, by his first wife Lady Augusta Bingham, who was the first daughter of George Charles Bingham, third Earl of Lucan. The couple had a daughter, Diamond Hardinge (1900–1927), and two sons, Edward and Alexander (1894–1960), who succeeded him as Baron Hardinge of Penshurst.

The first Baron Hardinge of Penshurst is commemorated at St John the Baptist, Penshurst. His eldest son, The Hon. Edward Hardinge, died 18 December 1914, aged 22, from wounds while serving as a Lieutenant with the 15th (The King's) Hussars in France. He was also the godson of Alexandra of Denmark. Diamond Hardinge was a bridesmaid at the wedding of Prince Albert, Duke of York, and Lady Elizabeth Bowes-Lyon on 3 May 1923.

== Styles and honours ==
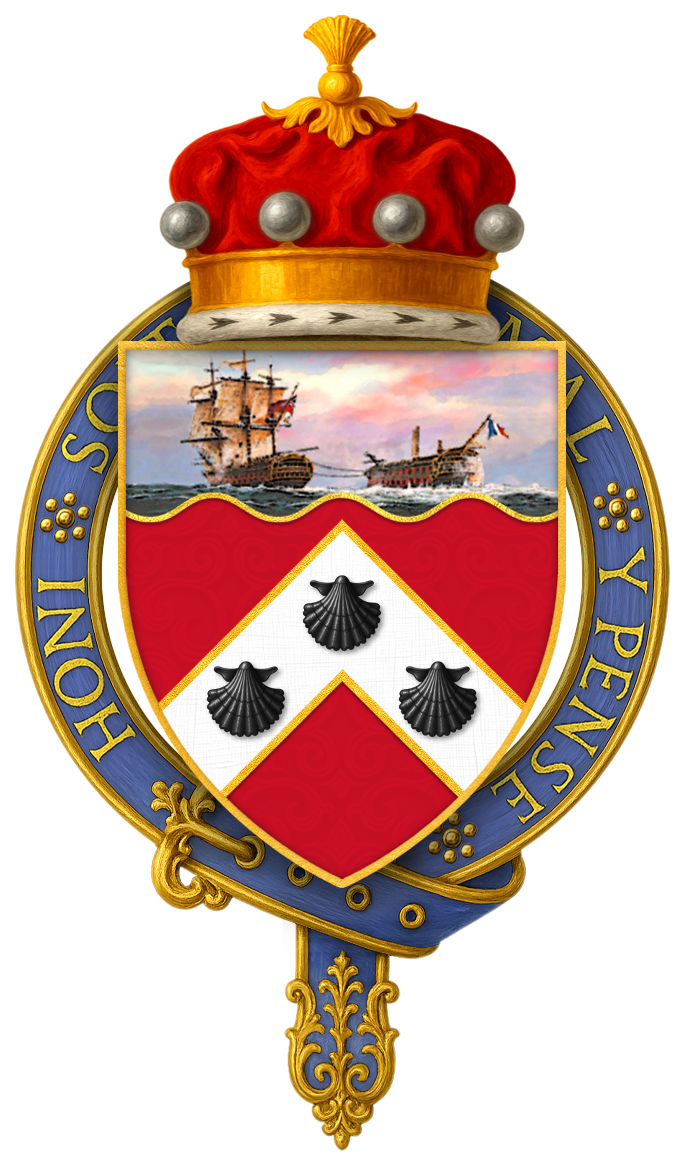
Shield of Arms of Charles Hardinge, 1st Baron Hardinge of Penshurst, KG, GCB, GCSI, GCMG, GCIE, GCVO, ISO, PC, DL

Hardinge had the unusual distinction of being a non-royal recipient of six British knighthoods.

- June 1858 – July 1895: The Honourable Charles Hardinge
- July 1895 – April 1903: The Honourable Charles Hardinge CB
- April 1903 – 7 March 1904: The Honourable Charles Hardinge CB CVO
- 7–26 March 1904: The Right Honourable Charles Hardinge CB CVO
- 26 March – 28 April 1904: The Right Honourable Sir Charles Hardinge KCMG CB CVO
- 28 April – 10 May 1904: His Excellency The Right Honourable Sir Charles Hardinge KCMG CB CVO
- 10 May 1904 – 2 January 1905: His Excellency The Right Honourable Sir Charles Hardinge KCMG KCVO CB
- 2 January – 9 November 1905: His Excellency The Right Honourable Sir Charles Hardinge GCMG KCVO CB
- 9 November 1905 – June 1906: The Right Honourable Sir Charles Hardinge GCMG GCVO CB
- June 1906 – 23 June 1910: The Right Honourable Sir Charles Hardinge GCMG GCVO CB ISO
- 23 June – 2 August 1910: The Right Honourable Sir Charles Hardinge GCB GCMG GCVO ISO
- 2 August – 23 November 1910: The Right Honourable The Lord Hardinge of Penshurst GCB GCMG GCVO ISO PC
- 23 November 1910 – 24 March 1916: His Excellency The Right Honourable The Lord Hardinge of Penshurst GCB GCSI GCMG GCIE GCVO ISO PC Viceroy & Governor-General of India
- 24 March – 4 April 1916: His Excellency The Right Honourable The Lord Hardinge of Penshurst KG GCB GCSI GCMG GCIE GCVO ISO PC Viceroy & Governor-General of India
- 4 April 1916 – 27 November 1920: The Right Honourable The Lord Hardinge of Penshurst KG GCB GCSI GCMG GCIE GCVO ISO PC
- 27 November 1920 – 1 February 1923: His Excellency The Right Honourable the Lord Hardinge of Penshurst KG GCB GCSI GCMG GCIE GCVO ISO PC HM Ambassador Extraordinary & Plenipotentiary to the French Republic
- 1 February 1923 – 2 August 1944: The Right Honourable The Lord Hardinge of Penshurst KG GCB GCSI GCMG GCIE GCVO ISO PC

== Books written ==
- Old Diplomacy
- My Indian Years 1910-1916: the Reminiscences of Lord Hardinge of Penshurst.

== See also ==
- Delhi conspiracy case

== Sources ==
- Briton C. Busch (1980). Hardinge of Penshurst: a study of the old diplomacy. Hamden, Conn.: Conference on British Studies and Indiana University at South Bend by Archon Books. ISBN 9780208018304.
- Lord Hardinge of Penshurst (1947). The Reminiscences of Lord Hardinge of Penshurst. London.
- Steiner, Zara S. (1969). The Foreign Office and Foreign Policy 1898–1914. Cambridge. ISBN 9780521076548.

=== Articles ===
- Goold, Douglas (1976). "Lord Hardinge and the Mesopotamia Expedition and Inquiry, 1914–1917". The Historical Journal. 19 (4): 919–945. doi:10.1017/S0018246X00010773. S2CID 162259136.

Government offices
Preceded by The Earl of Minto	Viceroy of India; 1910–1916	Succeeded by The Lord Chelmsford
Diplomatic posts
Preceded by Charles Stewart Scott	British Ambassador to Russia; 1904–1906	Succeeded by Sir Arthur Nicolson
Preceded by The Lord Sanderson	Permanent Under-Secretary for Foreign Affairs; 1906–1910	Succeeded by Sir Arthur Nicolson
Preceded by Sir Arthur Nicolson	Permanent Under-Secretary for Foreign Affairs; 1916–1920	Succeeded by Eyre Crowe
Preceded by The Earl of Derby	British Ambassador to France; 1920–1922	Succeeded by The Marquess of Crewe
Peerage of the United Kingdom
New creation	Baron Hardinge of Penshurst; 1910–1944	Succeeded by Alexander Hardinge
