= The Gandhi Murder =

2019 British-Indian historical political thriller film

- Theatrical release poster
- Directed by: Karim Traïdia; Pankaj Sehgal
- Screenplay by: Ralitza Ivanova
- Produced by: Ralitza Ivanova; Nogen Boruah; Moobi Alwright
- Starring: Stephen Lang; Behzaad Khan; Luke Pasqualino; Om Puri; Vinnie Jones; Jesus Sans
- Cinematography: Tim Angulo; Ajayan Vincent
- Music by: Robert Diggy Morrison
- Production company: Nugen Media Production
- Release date: 30 January 2019
- Running time: 118 minutes
- Country: India
- Language: English
- Budget: £15 million

The Gandhi Murder is a 2019 historical action thriller film directed by Karim Traïdia and Pankaj Sehgal. It examines the events leading to the assassination of Mahatma Gandhi. It stars Stephen Lang, Luke Pasqualino, Om Puri and Vinnie Jones.

== Plot ==
Set in the fraught aftermath of India’s independence from Britain and the partition of British India into India and Pakistan, the film follows the conflicted — and failed — efforts of three disparate Indian police officers to act upon intel suggesting that Hindu militants were planning to kill Gandhi for his tolerance of Muslims.

== Cast ==
- Stephen Lang as D.I.G Sunil Raina
- Luke Pasqualino as DCP Jimmy
- Om Puri as T.G.
- Vinnie Jones as Sir Norman Smith
- Vikas Shrivastav as Nathuram Godse
- Jesus Sans as Gandhi
- Bobbie Phillips as Elizabeth
- Mark Moses as Sir Percy Sillitoe
- Rajit Kapur as Jawaharlal Nehru
- Colton Tapp as John Booth
- Elissar as Edwina – Seductress
- Nassar as SSP Ashok
- Vivaan Tiwari as Inspector Onkar
- Raajpal Yadav as DSP Singh
- Gregory Schwabe as Lord Mountbatten
- Anant Mahadevan as Professor Jain
- Avtar Gill as Sardar Patel
- Govind Namdeo as Morarji Desai; D.S. Parchure
- Joe Bevilacqua as Abraham Lincoln
- Behzad Khan as Vishnu Karkare
- Sachin Nikam as DSP Doel
- Lisa Holsappel-Marrs as Edwina Mountbatten
- Ravi Gossain as Nana
- Gaurav Mohindra as Sub-Inspector Deshmukh
- Vishal Om Prakash as Inspector (CID) Raj
- Alessa Novelli as Emily
- Alen Thomson as Madan Lal
- Amit Verma as Samsher
- Pankaj Sehgal as Sam
- Chetan Arora as ACP Rao Saheb Gurtu

== Reception ==
The Guardian panned the film, awarding it one star and criticizing the strange casting choices (such as Lang as an Indian character) and poor production values. The New York Times was equally critical, questioning the basis of the film and calling the production 'shoddy'. The Los Angeles Times called the script 'clunky' and said 'Its timely messages become muted amid a kaleidoscope of settings, characters, brusque action scenes, blunt speechifying and wan romance.'

== See also ==
- List of artistic depictions of Mahatma Gandhi
