= Dattatraya Parchure =

Indian activist and politician

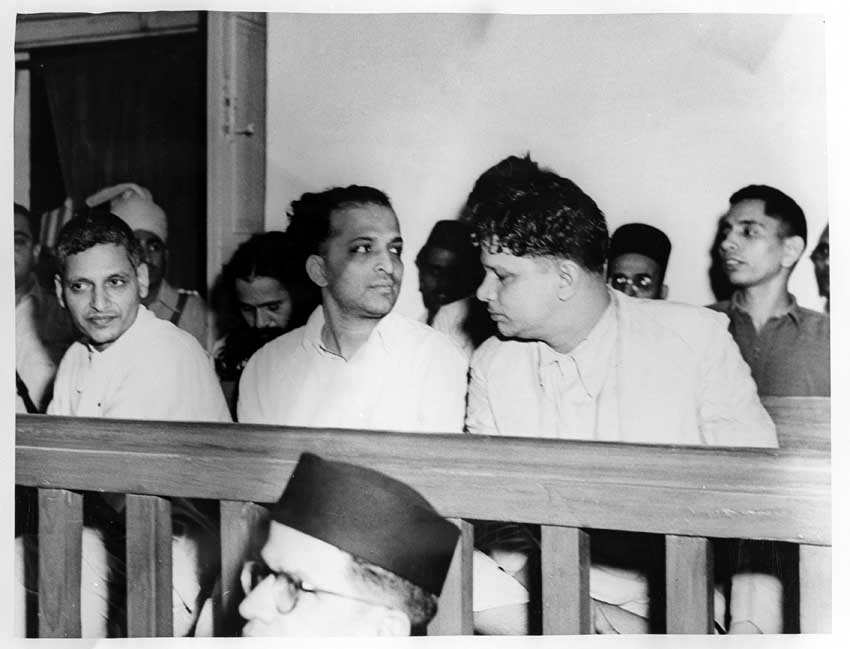
The trial of persons accused of participation and complicity in Gandhi's assassination at the Special Court in Red Fort Delhi on 27 May 1948. Front row, left to right: Nathuram Godse, Narayan Apte, and Vishnu Ramkrishna Karkare. Seated behind, left to right: Digambar Badge, Shankar Kistaiya, Vinayak Damodar Savarkar, Gopal Godse, and Dattatraya Sadashiv Parachure.

Dattatraya Sadashiv Parchure (1902–1985) was a doctor and a member of the Akhil Bharatiya Hindu Mahasabha. He was one of several people accused of the assassination of Mahatma Gandhi. Initially sentenced to life imprisonment by a lower court, he was acquitted upon appeal by the Punjab High Court.

== Personal life ==
Parchure was born in 1902, in a Hindu Kokanstha Brahmin family from the state of Maharashtra. His father was a senior officer in the state education department. As a teenager, he was keen on wrestling, and won the Gwalior State title in his late teens. He was a homoeopathic doctor by training and profession, receiving his MBBS from Grant Medical College in Bombay (now Mumbai) in the 1920s. After acquiring his degree, he practised in Bombay in the Jamshetjee Jeejeebhoy hospital until 1935, when he was dismissed for insubordination. By 1937, he became disillusioned with Western medicine, and instead began practising Ayurvedic medicine in Gwalior where his family lived, specialising as a paediatrician. His disillusionment was related to his growing interest at the time in Hindu revivalism and Hindu Nationalism.

== Hindutva activism ==
Parchure was an active member of the Akhil Bharatiya Hindu Mahasabha. He founded the Gwalior branch of the Mahasabha in 1935, and was involved with shifting the organisation to a more hardline and militant outlook. He travelled through the rural areas of the state promoting Hindutva ideology, which had first been expounded by Vinayak Damodar Savarkar. Parchure met Savarkar for the first time in 1939, at a conference of the Mahasabha. By that point Parchure had become an ardent follower of Savarkar's writings on Hindutva and anti-colonialism. The same year he established the para-military organisation known as the Hindu Rashtra Sena (HRS), in response to what he perceived as marginalisation of Hindus by the Muslim ruler of the state. The HRS began organising violent attacks on Muslim localities, which brought Parchure notoriety as "the most controversial political figure in Gwalior". During this period, Parchure also had several meetings with Nathuram Godse, who would go on to assassinate Mahatma Gandhi. In 1942 Godse had formed an organisation known as the Hindu Rashtra Dal, with similar objectives to the HRS. Although proposals to merge the two were discussed, they never came to fruition. Parchure was the chief speaker at the Poona meet of the Hindu Mahasabha held on 2 December 1947 and an official report of the event described him as a "second Savarkar."

== Assassination of Mahatma Gandhi ==
On 30 January 1948, Godse assassinated Mahatma Gandhi with a black Beretta M1934. Parchure reportedly celebrated Gandhi's assassination by distributing sweets. On 3 February he was detained and was charged with assisting in Gandhi's murder by providing Godse with the murder weapon. On 18 February 1948 he was formally arrested on charges of criminal conspiracy under section 120B, 109 and 114 of Indian Penal Code.

Before the Magistrate of Gwalior, he made a confession in which he accepted the charges laid on him. He stated that he had acquired the pistol from Gangadhar Dandavate, and passed it on to Godse. Godse, along with Narayan Apte, was stated to have travelled from Delhi to Gwalior by train on 28 January 1948 to obtain a pistol. Godse wanted an automatic pistol to replace his own unreliable pistol. Parchure offered him the semi-automatic Beretta, which Godse experimented with in Parchure's back yard, and then purchased for ₹ 300. Parchure stated that the pistol had originally belonged to Deshmukh, an officer in the Gwalior State Army who had acquired the pistol in Germany. Godse and Apte then left for Delhi on 29 January.

Based on this confession, Parchure was initially sentenced to life imprisonment by a lower court on 10 February 1949. Madanlal Pahwa, Vishnu Karkare, Gopal Godse, and Shankar Kistaiya were given the same sentence. Savarkar was acquitted and Digambar Badge was pardoned for his deposition against others, while Nathuram Godse and Narayan Apte were sentenced to be hanged. Parchure, however, appealed the decision in the Punjab High Court, stating that his confession had been coerced from him, and that he had no part in the conspiracy. He said that he had met Godse and Apte in Gwalior when they travelled there for work related to recruiting volunteers for the HRS. Both Godse and Apte concurred with Parchure's fresh statement, and Godse stated that the pistol was acquired by him from a dealer in a refugee camp in Delhi. As a result, Parchure was acquitted in June 1949 by a bench of three judges who stated that there was no evidence of his involvement. Kistaiya was also acquitted as he was found to be working only as a servant of Badge and not as an accomplice. The sentences of the other five were retained by the High Court.

After his release from jail, Parchure was banned from Gwalior. However, he returned there in 1952 on the condition of not participating in political activities. He later restarted his medical practice, and died in Gwalior in 1985.
