= Kapur Commission =

Indian commission of inquiry into the murder of Mahatma Gandhi

The Kapur Commission was a commission of inquiry by the Government of India, into the murder conspiracy of Mahatma Gandhi.

== Kapur Commission ==
The release of the conspirators in the Gandhi murder case in 1964 and the resultant celebrations in Pune and remarks of Gajanan Vishwanath Ketkar, the grandson of Bal Gangadhar Tilak, that he was aware of Nathuram Godse's desire to kill Gandhi, led to a public outrage and resulted in the forming of the Pathak commission, by notification dated 22 March 1965. When Gopal Swarup Pathak became central minister and then governor of Mysore state, the Kapur Commission was set up in 1966 as the commission of inquiry into the conspiracy to murder Gandhi. A one-man commission consisting of Jivanlal Kapur, judge of the Supreme Court, was appointed to conduct the inquiry on 21 November 1966. To assist this commission, G. N. Vaidya was appointed by the Government of Maharashtra and K. S. Chawla, Barrister-at-Law was appointed for Government of India. The terms of reference for this inquiry were following:

1. whether any persons, in particular, Gajanan Vishwanath Ketkar, of Poona, had prior information of the conspiracy of Nathuram Godse and others to assassinate Mahatma Gandhi;
2. whether any of such persons had communicated the said information to any authorities of the Government of India; in particular, whether the Gajanan Viswanath Ketkar had conveyed the said information to the late Bal Gangadhar Kher, through the late Balukaka Kanetkar;
3. if so, what action was taken by the Government of Bombay, in particular by the late Bal Gangadhar Kher, and the Government of India on the basis of the said information.

The commission took three years to complete its work. It strongly indicted those responsible for Gandhi's security with negligence. It was provided with statements recorded by Bombay police, not produced in the court, especially the testimony of two of Hindu Mahasabha leader Vinayak Savarkar's close aides - Appa Ramachandra Kasar, his bodyguard, and Gajanan Vishnu Damle, his secretary. Statements of both Kasar and Damle that the commission examined had already been recorded by the Bombay police on 4 March 1948.

== Events leading to its formation ==
On 12 November 1964, a religious programme was organized in Pune, to celebrate the release of the Gopal Godse, Madanlal Pahwa, Vishnu Karkare from jail after serving their sentences for their role in Gandhi's assassination. Dr. G. V. Ketkar, grandson of Bal Gangadhar Tilak, former editor of Kesari and then editor of Tarun Bharat, who presided over the function, revealed that six months before Gandhi's assassination Nathuram Godse had disclosed his ideas to kill Gandhi and was opposed by Ketkar. Ketkar said that he passed the information to Balukaka Kanitkar who conveyed it to the then Chief Minister of Bombay State, B. G. Kher. The Indian Express in its issue of 14 November 1964 commented adversely on Ketkar's conduct that Ketkar's fore-knowledge of the assassination of Gandhi added to the mystery of the circumstances preceding to the assassination. Ketkar was arrested. A public furor ensued both outside and inside the Maharashtra Legislative Assembly and both houses of the Indian parliament. There was a suggestion that there had been a deliberate dereliction of duty on the part of people in high authority, who failed to act responsibly even though they had information that could have prevented Gandhi's shooting. Under pressure of 29 members of parliament and public opinion, the then-Union home minister, Gulzarilal Nanda, appointed Gopal Swarup Pathak, M. P. and a senior advocate of the Supreme Court of India, in charge of inquiry of conspiracy to murder Gandhi. Since both Kanitkar and Kher were deceased, the central government intended on conducting a thorough inquiry with the help of old records in consultation with the government of Maharashtra, Pathak was given three months to conduct his inquiry. But as Pathak was appointed a central minister and then governor of Mysore state, the commission of inquiry was reconstituted and Jivanlal Kapur a retired judge of the Supreme Court of India was appointed to conduct the inquiry.

== Working ==
Justice Jivanlal Kapur was appointed as a one-man Commission to conduct inquiry into the conspiracy to murder Gandhi on 21 November 1966 and was completed on 30 September 1969. It examined 101 witnesses, 407 documents were produced, by witnesses, and the governments of India and Maharashtra. It had 162 sittings and traveled to Mumbai, Delhi, Nagpur, Dharwad, Pune, Baroda and Chandigarh. Counsels for governments of Maharashtra and India were R. S. Kotwal and B. B. Lal respectively, they argued their cases for 37, 13 days respectively. G. V. Ketkar was the first witness to be examined. J. D. Nagarwala and Morarji Desai were the key witnesses who were examined for 15 and 7 days respectively. J. D. Nagarwala was the Deputy Commissioner of Police who was appointed as investigating officer on the murder case and Morarji Desai the Chief Minister of the then Bombay State.

== Findings ==
The commission pointed out various lapses and flaws on part of the Inspector General of Police of Delhi, Sanjivi. The commission remarked summarising the Delhi investigation,

The anxiety of the officialdom in New Delhi, to take any intelligent interest in the investigation in the bomb case is not indicated by any tangible evidence on the investigation in Mumbai the commission observed

After the murder the police suddenly woke up into diligent activity throughout India, of which there was no evidence before the tragedy

According to Noorani, the Kapur Commission was provided with evidence not produced in the court; especially the testimony of two of Savarkar's close aides - Appa Ramachandra Kasar, his bodyguard, and Gajanan Vishnu Damle, his secretary. The court had earlier exonerated Savarkar for want of corroborative evidence in support of the approver’s confession. However, Justice Kapur's findings are all too clear. He concluded: "All these facts taken together were destructive of any theory other than the conspiracy to murder by Savarkar and his group."
