= Godse (disambiguation) =

Nathuram Godse (1910-1949) was an Indian Hindu extremist who assassinated Mahatma Gandhi.

Godse may also refer to:

== Films ==
- Godse (film), a 2022 Indian Telugu-language action thriller film by Gopi Ganesh
- Gandhi Godse – Ek Yudh, a 2023 Indian alternate history film by Rajkumar Santoshi about the assassination of Mahatma Gandhi

== People ==
- Godse (surname)

== Other ==
- Me Nathuram Godse Boltoy, Marathi-language play by Vinay Apte
- Godse's Children: Hindutva Terror in India, 2011 Indian political history book by Subhash Gatade about Hindu terrorism

== See also ==
- Goetze (disambiguation)
- Goatse
