= Chicago South Side Film Festival =

Annual film festival in the US

- Location: Chicago, Illinois, U.S.
- Founded: 2017
- Founded by: Michelle Kennedy
- Language: English

XL Film Festival, formerly known as the Chicago South Side Film Festival, is an annual film festival that features work by filmmakers from Chicago's South Side. The festival was founded by Michelle Kennedy and debuted in 2017. Troy Pryor of Creative Cypher acquired and renamed the festival in 2022.

== History ==
The Chicago South Side Film Festival (CSSFF) screens films set in or created by filmmakers from the South Side. According to the executive director and creator, Michelle Kennedy, the festival provides a platform for filmmakers from the South Side, stating that "there are nearly a hundred film festivals that occur every year in Chicago, and none of them are [focused] on the South Side." The debut festival in October 2017 screened films that were shot on the south side, such as Love Jones and Mahogany.

The festival offers workshops and courses related to film production. CSSFF historically takes place every year at the Chatham Studio Movie Grill and partners with institutions such as local art galleries and churches. In 2020, it moved to a virtual format due to social distancing requirements related to the COVID-19 pandemic. In 2021 CSSFF was presented in a hybrid format with sessions and screenings available online and in person.

During the last quarter of 2022, Creative Cypher, founded by Troy Pryor, merged the Cypher Foundation with the Chicago South Side Film Festival. The festival was rebranded as the XL Film Fest and relaunched in 2023 as a festival with a continued focus on Black artists that will includes multiple forms of storytelling beyond film.
