= Three Days in August =

- Theatrical Release Poster
- Directed by: Johnathan Brownlee
- Screenplay by: Chad Berry; Johnathan Brownlee; David Langlinais
- Story by: Chad Berry; David Langlinais
- Produced by: Jeff Berlin; Chad Berry; Johnathan Brownlee; Adam Donaghey; John Forte; David Kiger; Shannon Kincaid; Allen Stringer; Kincaid Stringer; James Tumminia
- Starring: Barry Bostwick; Meg Foster; Mariette Hartley; Edward James Hyland; Mollie Milligan; Stephen Snedden; Colton Tapp; Luis Albert Acevedo Jr. Cal Bartlett
- Cinematography: Bongani Mlambo
- Edited by: Logan Hefflefinger; Sai Selvarajan
- Music by: Brian Flores; John Hunter
- Production companies: Sionna Productions; Torfoot Films; Ubiquimedia; Zero Trans Fat Productions
- Release date: December 2, 2016
- Running time: 97 minutes
- Country: United States
- Language: English

Three Days in August is a 2016 American drama directed by Johnathan Brownlee. The film is based on a true story written by Chad Berry and David Langlinais. The screenplay was written by Berry, Brownlee and Langlinais.

== Synopsis ==
The story centers on an adopted Irish-American artist's search for her birth mother, and the family dynamics when she secretly invites both sets of parents for a surprise reunion so she can paint a family portrait.

The film is inspired by the true story of Texas painter Shannon Kincaid, an adopted Irish-American artist who was given away at birth by a 16-year-old mother.

== Cast ==
- Barry Bostwick as John
- Meg Foster as Maggie
- Mariette Hartley as Maureen
- Edward James Hyland as Aiden
- Mollie Milligan as Maggie
- Colton Tapp as Liam
- Stephen Snedden as Sam
- Cal Bartlett as Francis
- Luis Albert Acevedo Jr. as Father Granado (as Luis Acevado)

== Development ==
The screenplay for Three Days in August was the winning entry in a screenwriting competition sponsored by the Dallas Film Society in 2015. The competition, entitled The Sionna Project, drew 200 submissions from 26 countries.

Three Days in August was announced in Variety in October 2015, with Barry Bostwick, Mariette Hartley, Ed Hyland, Mollie Milligan, Meg Foster, Cal Bartlett and Colton Tapp attached to star and Johnathan Brownlee to direct and produce.

== Location ==
Filming took place in October 2015 in Mineral Wells, Texas.

== Release ==
Three Days in August premiered at the Dallas International Film Festival in April 2016 and had its international premiere at the Montreal World Film Festival in August 2016. The film had a limited national theatrical release through the Dallas-based Studio Movie Grill chain in December 2016.
