= Gandhi's death =

Gandhi's death may refer to:

- Assassination of Mahatma Gandhi
- Assassination of Indira Gandhi
- Assassination of Rajiv Gandhi
