= Johnathan Brownlee =

Canadian–American film producer, director and screenwriter

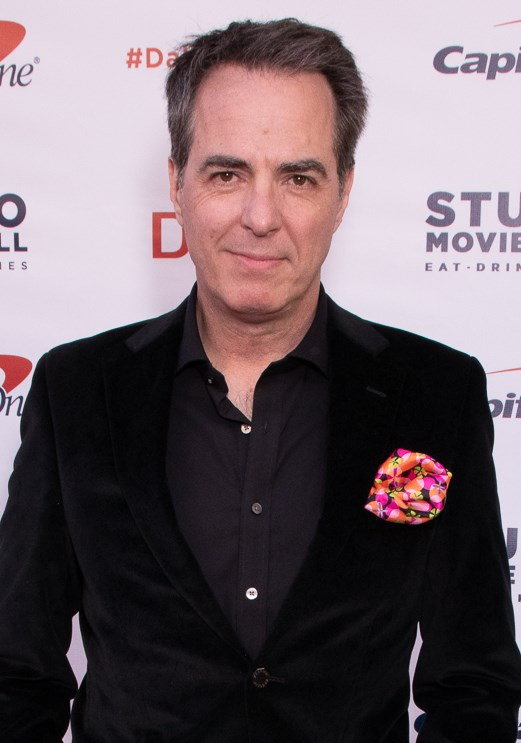
- Johnathan Brownlee at the 2019 Dallas International Film Festival
- Occupations: Producer, director, writer

Johnathan Brownlee is a Canadian–American film producer, director, screenwriter and actor. He co-produced the feature films Decoding Annie Parker (2013), Three Days in August (2016), Occupy, Texas (2016), Puppet Master: The Littlest Reich (2018), The Standoff at Sparrow Creek (2018), and Satanic Panic (2019) and produced the film The Yeti (2026).

== Early life ==
Brownlee attended Hofstra University from 1986 to 1990, where he received a Bachelor of Arts degree. He attended Brandeis University from 1990 to 1993, where he received a Master of Fine Arts degree.

== Career ==
=== Film and television career ===
Brownlee's first feature film was the 2013 drama Decoding Annie Parker, which covers the story of Annie Parker and the discovery of the BRCA1 breast cancer gene.

In 2016, he was executive producer and producer of the film Occupy, Texas, the story of a disillusioned Occupy Wall Street protester who must return to Texas to care for his two teen sisters and the family estate after the death of their parents. Brownlee wanted the film to be "an indigenous project, a Dallas project", and shot almost exclusively in Dallas, with a one-day exception in New York City. He was director, executive producer, producer, and a writer of the film Three Days in August. The film premiered at the Dallas International Film Festival in April 2016 and had its international premiere at the Montreal World Film Festival in August 2016. The film had a limited national theatrical release through the Dallas-based Studio Movie Grill chain in December 2016. Brownlee was also an executive producer on the horror comedy film Puppet Master: The Littlest Reich.

In 2018, Brownlee was a producer for The Standoff at Sparrow Creek, a film about a reclusive former cop who must investigate fellow militia members as suspects in a mass shooting at a police funeral. The film had its world premiere at Toronto International Film Festival and was acquired by RLJE Films. In 2019, he was co-executive producer for Satanic Panic, a comedy horror film. Shot in Dallas, the film centers on a pizza delivery girl who delivers food to a group of socialite Satanists who plan to use her as a virgin sacrifice. The film was released in September 2019.

In 2020, streaming platform CMAX.TV added to its lineup 26 past episodes of Johnathan Brownlee's atHome, an original home renovation series written and produced by Brownlee that aired on Canadian television in 2002-2003.

Brownlee announced in December 2022 plans for the project, The Will Rogers Story, in partnership with1883 actor Eric Nelsen.

In October 2024, Torfoot Entertainment Group, an LA-based film and TV firm, was launched by Brownlee and director/producer Ross Meyerson.

=== Nonprofit organizations ===
In 2017, Brownlee was named CEO and President of the nonprofit organization Dallas Film Society and Executive Director of the Dallas International Film Festival. In 2018, he created the Veterans Institute for Film and Media (VIFM), a program of Dallas Film that prepares veterans for careers in film and media production through education, mentorships, and job placements. Brownlee founded Dallas Film's second festival, the North Texas Film Festival (NTXFF), which premiered September 26–29, 2019, and was named Best New Film Festival by Dallas Observer.

== Awards and honors ==
Brownlee received a Leo Awards Best Host – Information Series honor in 2003 for his television show, Johnathan Brownlee's atHome. He received five Leo Award Nominations, including Best Lifestyle Series, Best Writing – Lifestyle Series, Best Information Series, Best Screenwriting – Information Series, and Best Host – Lifestyle Series.

In 2020, Brownlee received a Business Council For The Arts Obelisk Award nomination for "Visionary Nonprofit Arts Leader".

In 2021, the "Mi Vida" campaign created and directed by Brownlee for Four Corners Brewing Company/Constellation Brands received 14 Telly Awards: four Gold Tellys, seven Silver Tellys, and three Bronze Tellys.

In 2022, the "Mi Vida" campaign created and directed by Brownlee for Four Corners Brewing Company/Constellation Brands received 18 Telly Awards: six Gold Tellys, seven Silver Tellys, and five Bronze Tellys.

In 2023, Brownlee received 5 Telly Awards: one Gold Telly, three Silver Tellys, and one Bronze Telly for creating and directing projects for the San Antonio Holocaust Museum and the short film, "(S)hit Squad."

== Filmography ==
Film
Year	Title	Director	Writer	Producer	Notes	Ref.
2013	Southside	No	No	Yes	Short film	
2013	Decoding Annie Parker	No	No	Yes	Executive producer	
2016	Occupy, Texas	No	No	Yes	Executive producer and producer	
2016	Three Days in August	Yes	Yes	Yes	Executive producer and producer	
2018	Puppet Master: The Littlest Reich	No	No	Yes	Executive producer and producer	
2018	The Standoff at Sparrow Creek	No	No	Yes	Producer	
2019	Satanic Panic	No	No	Yes	Co-executive producer	
2022	(S)hit Squad	Yes	No	Yes	Executive producer and producer	
2022	Brewmaster:In the Beginning	Yes	Yes	Yes	Executive producer and producer	
2023	Navigating Christmas	No	Yes	Yes	Executive Producer	
2026	The Yeti	No	No	Yes	Executive Producer and producer	
