= Godse (surname) =

Indian surname

Godse is a Marathi Brahmin surname.

- Dattatraya Ganesh Godse (1914–1992), Indian playwright
- Gopal Godse (1919–2005), brother and co-conspirator of Nathuram
- Hemant Godse (born 1970), Indian politician
- Mugdha Godse (born 1986), Indian model
- Nathuram Godse (1910–1949), assassin of Mahatma Gandhi
- Vishnubhat Godse (1827–1904), Hindu priest

== See also ==
- Godse (disambiguation)
