= Colton Tapp =

American actor, model and musician

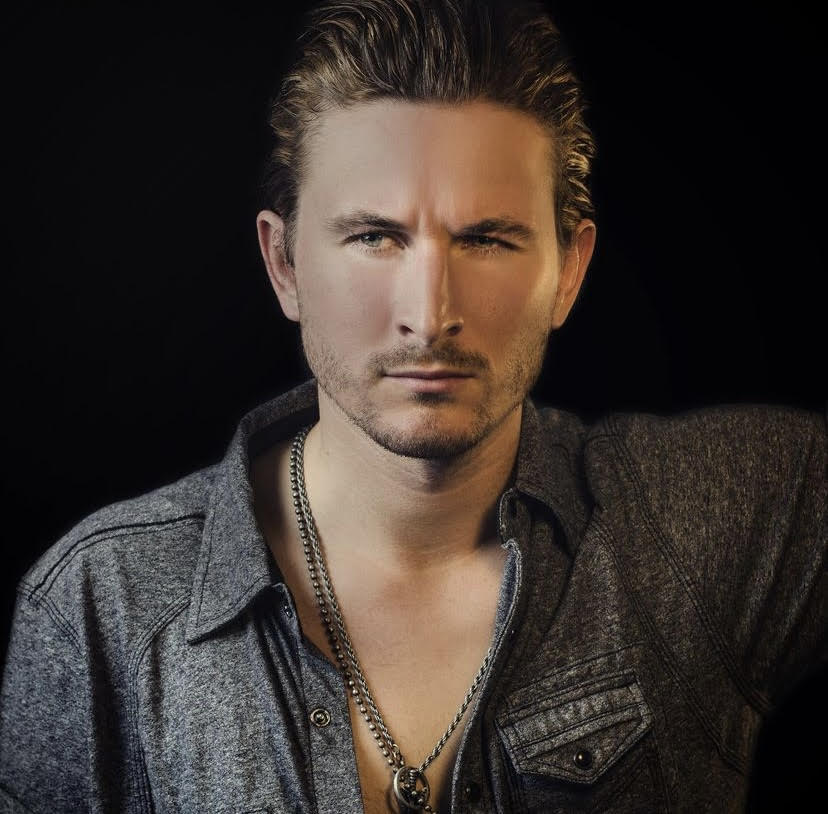
- Born: Wylie, Texas, United States
- Occupations: Actor, model
- Years active: 2016–present
- Website: coltontapp.com

Colton Dayne Tapp is an American actor, model and musician. Tapp is known in film for his roles in Three Days in August, Solar Eclipse: Depth of Darkness, Pi Day Die Day, The Boundary and Expulsion.

== Career ==
=== Film ===
In 2016, Tapp earned a breakout role as the son of an Irish painter in the movie, Three Days in August, directed by Johnathan Brownlee, which premiered at Dallas International Film Festival and internationally premiered at Montreal World Film Festival. Although not his first film, this role led him to following roles in films such as Pi Day Die Day, starring alongside Ari Lehman, John Wilkes Booth in Solar Eclipse: Depth of Darkness, a feature historic film shot in Sri Lanka about the rise and fall of Mahatma Gandhi and Abraham Lincoln, and The Boundary, co-starring with Neil DeGrasse Tyson. Tapp went on to film scifi-thriller Expulsion, where he performs dual roles as two versions of himself on different sides of a portal acted alongside Lar Park-Lincoln from Friday the 13th, Part VII.

In 2024, he appeared on The CW's crime drama Walker as Italian Fentanyl Kingpin, Frank Delmonico.

Recently, he has taken on roles in a variety of Lifetime and LMN made-for-TV movies, including I Am Your Biggest Fan, Murder, Lies & Marriage and The Beach Read Murders.

== Awards ==
- Best Actor (Texas Horror Film Festival, for Something's Here, 2015)
- Best Actor Nomination (US Hollywood International Film Festival, for Expulsion, 2020)
- Best Film (Producer, Rack Focus Film Festival 2% Evil, 2016)
- Best Film (Producer, Rack Focus Film Festival, The Precinct, 2017)
- State Champion (Texas UIL State Finals, The Boundary)

== Filmography ==
=== Film ===
Year	Title	Role	Notes
2026	100 Dates in Dallas	Keith	
2025	The Beach Read Murders	Roman	
2025	Marriage, Lies & Murder	Connor	
2025	I Am Your Biggest Fan	Cody	
2023	Infatuation	Daniel	
2020	Expulsion	Scott / Other Scott	Nominated Best Actor
2020	The Gandhi Murder	John Wilkes Booth	
2017	The Precinct	Jimmy	Also Director
2017	Three Days in August	Liam	
2016	Night Light	Dawson	
2016	The Boundary	Miles	
2016	2% Evil	Logan	Also Producer and Writer
2016	No Wifi Here	Steve	
2016	Morning Rift	Cody	
2016	Death Road	Blake	Also Producer
2015	Pi Day Die Day	Lucas	
2015	Something's Here	Thomas	Won Best Actor Award
2008	Blood on the Highway	Vampire	

=== TV ===
Year	Title	Role
2025	Vindication	Logan Cooke
2024	Walker	Frank Delmonico
2017	You Can Do Better	Vince
2017	Murder Made Me Famous	Detective Solerno
2017	National Enquirer Investigates	Liam Hemsworth
2015	Legends & Lies	Edmund Gaines
