= Decoding Annie Parker =

- Theatrical release poster
- Directed by: Steven Bernstein
- Written by: Steven Bernstein; Michael Moss; Adam Bernstein
- Produced by: Steven Bernstein; Keith Kjarval; Clark Peterson; Stuart W. Ross; Ron Senkowski; Johnathan Brownlee; Mary Vernieu
- Starring: Samantha Morton; Alice Eve; Maggie Grace; Rashida Jones; Chris Mulkey; Aaron Paul; Richard Schiff; Marley Shelton; Corey Stoll; Bradley Whitford; Helen Hunt
- Cinematography: Ted Hayash
- Edited by: Douglas Crise
- Music by: Steven Bramson
- Production companies: Dorado Media and Capital; Media House Capital; Story and Film; Ozymandias Productions
- Distributed by: Entertainment One Films
- Release dates: April 4, 2013 (Palm Beach); May 2, 2014 (United States)
- Running time: 91 minutes
- Country: United States
- Language: English

Decoding Annie Parker is a 2013 American drama film written and directed by Steven Bernstein. The film stars Samantha Morton, Helen Hunt and Aaron Paul. The film tells the story of Annie Parker and the discovery of the BRCA1 breast cancer gene.

== Plot ==
Eleven-year-old Annie Parker is living the perfect young life, loved by all, and especially by her mother, father, and older sister. But none of them knows that something horrible is stalking their perfect family. On a fall afternoon in 1976, young Annie hears a noise from upstairs. Her mother has collapsed and died, and an agonizing downward spiral begins.

At UC Berkeley, a brilliant research geneticist named Mary-Claire King is embarking on something of a personal crusade to uncover the genetic roots of breast cancer. While still in her twenties, she has already made a famous discovery that made the cover of the prestigious journal Science—quantifying the genetic variation between humans and chimpanzees. But her conviction that there is a hereditary basis to at least some forms of breast cancer is not widely shared. Nevertheless, her tireless research throughout the 1980s would end in a medical breakthrough—the discovery of the location of the BRCA1 hereditary breast cancer gene—considered one of the most important scientific discoveries of the twentieth century.

At the age of 19, after the sudden death of her father, Annie marries Paul and soon becomes pregnant. She struggles to find a way in the world with her equally young but misguided husband and her older sister, Joan Parker who tries to become a surrogate parent to Anne. But, cruelly, Joan contracts the same cancer that killed their mother, and in a few months, she, too, is dead.

Annie is diagnosed with the same disease that killed her mother and sister—breast cancer. It is severe, and surgery and chemotherapy, with all the accompanying difficulties, soon follow. She loses her hair, and if that wasn't enough to endure, her husband, never really mature or stable, has begun an affair with Annie’s closest friend Louise and leaves her. Paul is soon diagnosed with cancer and expires shortly before she is diagnosed with a second cancer.

While Annie struggles, King is pursuing her belief that some forms of breast and ovarian cancer have a hereditary basis. While she captures headlines for her work applying DNA fingerprinting to help reunite "the disappeared" with their families in Argentina, her priority is to map the breast cancer gene. King focuses on collecting families with a particularly high incidence of breast cancer, suspecting that these cases are most likely to reveal any genetic predispositions. Advances in genetic mapping through the 1980s gradually allow her team to embark on studies to map the location of the BRCA1 gene. Finally, in 1990, King and her team find conclusive evidence linking DNA markers on chromosome 17 with an inherited flaw in a gene dubbed BRCA1. The work was presented at the American Society of Human Genetics conference in Cincinnati, and published in Science a short time later.

Mary Claire King ended up on the cover of Time, and Anne Parker finally had the answer she herself had long sought. Annie Parker happily remarried, and a few years later contracted cancer for a third time. And survives again. And she laughed while being treated, for reasons only she knew and understood.

== Cast ==
- Samantha Morton as Annie Parker
- Helen Hunt as Mary-Claire King
- Aaron Paul as Paul
- Rashida Jones as Kim
- Richard Schiff as Mr. Allen
- Bradley Whitford as Marshall Parker
- Bob Gunton as Dr. Benton
- Alice Eve as Louise
- Maggie Grace as Sarah
- Corey Stoll as Sean
- Ben McKenzie as Tom
- Mageina Tovah as Ellen
- James Tupper as Steve
- Kate Micucci as Rachel
- Spencer Garrett as David
- Marley Shelton as Joan Parker
- Robert Pine as Dr. Frank
- Chris Mulkey as Ralph Parker

== Production ==
The filming began in October 2011 and wrapped in November 2011. Post-production was completed in 2012.

== Reception ==
On the review aggregator website Rotten Tomatoes, 54% of 24 critics' reviews are positive.

== Awards ==
- Director Steven Bernstein was awarded The Alfred P. Sloan Feature Film Prize at the 2013 Hamptons International Film Festival.
- Samantha Morton was awarded the Best Actress Golden Space Needle Award at the 2013 Seattle International Film Festival for her portrayal of Annie Parker.

2014 Milan International Film Festival

- Steven Bernstein was nominated as Best Director.
- Steven Bernstein, Adam Bernstein and Michael Moss were nominated as Best Screenwriters.
- Samantha Morton was nominated as Best Actress for her portrayal of Annie Parker.
- Helen Hunt won the Best Supporting Actress award for her portrayal of Dr. Mary-Claire King.
- Aaron Paul won the Best Supporting Actor award for his portrayal of Paul.
- Ted Hayash was nominated as Best Cinematographer.
- Douglas Crise was nominated as Best Editor.

== Release ==
The film was released domestically by Entertainment One Films simultaneously in theaters and video-on-demand on May 2, 2014.
