= Pi Day Die Day =

- Theatrical release poster
- Directed by: Michael E. Cullen II
- Written by: Lindsey LaForest
- Starring: Ari Lehman; Justin Rose; Colton Tapp; Spring JoyLynn
- Cinematography: Zak Kolhoff; Clinton LaForest; Gabriel Rios-Hannon; Jack Warfield
- Edited by: Michael E. Cullen II; Clinton LaForest
- Music by: Chad Fletcher; Matthew Haase
- Production companies: One Stoplight Productions; Cullen Park Productions
- Release date: 12 March 2016 (U.S.)
- Running time: 92 minutes
- Country: United States
- Language: English

Pi Day Die Day is a 2016 horror comedy produced by One Stoplight Productions and Cullen Park Productions that revolves around a group of detectives seeking to thwart the plans of a killer at a local high school on Pi Day. It was directed by Michael E. Cullen II and written by Lindsey LaForest and stars Ari Lehman. Shot on location in Ohio, a fundraising campaign was started on Indiegogo to help supplement the film's budget. The film had its official premiere on March 12, 2016, gathering mixed reviews, and was also released on home media.

== Plot ==
A killer is on the loose at a respectable high school in Euclid Falls, and the principal and a group of detectives must enlist the help of a mathematics teacher to discover the killer's identity and thwart his diabolical plans.

== Production ==
Pie Day Die Day was directed by Michael E. Cullen II, and most of the filming took place in Haskins, Ohio; the film was written by co-producer Lindsey LaForest, who described it as a "slashomedy" (slasher-cum-comedy). Actor Colton Tapp, who stars in the film, also expressed that the film "pays homage to the big teen slashers". The entire cast comprises "local talent" including Tapp and Ari Lehman (Friday the 13th), as well as comedian Steve Sabo, who made a cameo appearance. One Stoplight Productions and Cullen Productions also received an additional $3,970 in funds through the crowdfunding website Indiegogo.

== Reception ==
Pie Day Die Day had a limited release in the United States on March 12, 2016. It premiered at the Cle-Zel Theatre in Bowling Green, and was screened at the Maumee Indoor Theatre two days later on Pi Day. It is also available on DVD. The film was given 2.5 out of 5 stars by Matt Boiselle of Dread Central, who writes that "the schizophrenic mix of both practical and CGI effects" overwhelm the "entertaining" aspects of the film. "Reverend Leviathan", writing for the web magazine DarkestMagazine Goth, gave the film a positive review, lauding in particular the "tongue-in-cheek humor" and the "surprise ending".
