= Goetze =

Goetze or Götze is a German surname. It may refer to:

- Albrecht Goetze (1897–1971), German-American Hittitologist
- Auguste Götze (1840–1908), German singer, actress and vocal pedagogue
- Alfred Götze (1865–1948), German prehistorian
- Edmund Goetze (1843–1920), German literary historian and philologist
- Ekkeland Götze (born 1948), German artist and screenprinter*
- Emil Goetze (1856–1901), German tenor
- Fabian Götze (born 1990), German football player, who is a free agent now
- Felix Götze (born 1998), German football player
- Friedrich Götze (born 1951), German mathematician
- Hans Friedemann Götze (1897–1940), Nazi SS officer
- Marie Goetze (1865–1922), German contralto
- Mario Götze (born 1992), German football player
- Max Götze (1880–1944), German track cycling racer
- Paul Götze (1903–1948), Nazi SS officer at Auschwitz and Buchenwald concentration camps executed for war crimes
- Sigismund Goetze (1866–1939), British artist
- Vicki Goetze (born 1972), American golfing champion
- Volker Goetze (born 1972), German trumpeter
- Walter Goetze (1883–1961), German composer
- Wolfgang Götze (1937–2021), German theoretical physicist
- Caio Goetze (born 1993), Brazilian lawyer and cryptoanalyst

== See also ==
- Goetze's Candy Company, Baltimore, Maryland
- Goetze, a piston ring division of Federal-Mogul
- Goetze and Gwynn, organ-builders
- Goatse.cx, an Internet shock site
