= The Yeti (film) =

- Theatrical release poster
- Directed by: Gene Gallerano; William Pisciotta
- Written by: Gene Gallerano; William Pisciotta
- Produced by: Johnathan Brownlee; Ross Meyerson
- Starring: Brittany Allen; Eric Nelsen; Jim Cummings; William Sadler; Corbin Bernsen
- Cinematography: Joel Froome
- Edited by: Christina Bennett Lind
- Music by: John Hunter
- Production companies: Torfoot Entertainment Group; Hardscrabble Film Company
- Distributed by: Well Go USA Entertainment
- Release dates: April 3, 2026 (Beyond Fest); April 4, 2026 (United States)
- Running time: 93 minutes
- Country: United States
- Language: English
- Box office: $52,689

The Yeti is a 2026 American monster film directed and written by Gene Gallerano and William Pisciotta, in their feature directorial debuts. The film follows oil tycoon Merriell Sunday Sr. and adventurer Hollis Bannister who have disappeared without a trace, with their last known location being northern Alaska, which prompts Ellie Bannister and Merriell Sunday Jr. to search for their missing fathers, but as the search ensues, a prehistoric monster is stalking them.

The film was theatrically released in the United States on April 4, 2026.

== Plot ==
In 1947, a brutal storm in remote northern Alaska leads to a violent attack on an outpost, leaving a group of explorers dead or missing. Two years later, oil tycoon Merriell Sunday Sr. and legendary navigator and adventurer Hollis Bannister vanish without a trace in the same inhospitable region.

To locate them, Sunday's son, Merriell Sunday Jr. and Bannister's daughter Ellie, a skilled cartographer, mount a rescue expedition. They assemble a specialized team including guide Leander Coates, scientist Dr. Margaret Lamb, "Dynamite Dan", and Booker Marchmont. As they travel deeper into the frozen wilderness, communication breaks down and equipment malfunctions. The team continues to hear strange noises, prompting growing paranoia and fracturing the group with distrust.

The expedition soon comes face-to-face with a towering creature (a living descendant of prehistoric ape Gigantopithecus), the "Yeti", that systematically stalks and brutally murders the crew members one by one. After Coates is pulled through a window and killed, Ellie and Booker retreat to a radio outpost to call for help. While attempting to broadcast, the Yeti infiltrates the station and kills Booker.

Ellie flees into the woods and discovers a hidden camp where she finds Sunday Sr. alive, bound in shackles inside a cage. Upon freeing and treating him, Sunday Sr. confesses the truth: the original expedition was never to drill for oil, but to hunt down and capture a Yeti as a prize trophy. After tracking the Yeti, Sunday Sr. and his crew found a baby Yeti. Disgusted by Sunday's greed, Ellie's father, Hollis, stole the infant to protect it and locked Sunday Sr. inside the cage. The rampaging mother Yeti subsequently slaughtered the rest of Sunday Sr.'s original crew.

Sunday Sr., still consumed by his obsession, attacks Ellie in an attempt to continue his hunt. In self-defense, Ellie fights back and kills Sunday Sr. using a discarded Yeti tooth. Shortly after, Hollis arrives, holding the infant Yeti. Recognizing that the creature will never stop defending its territory, Hollis sacrifices himself to the mother Yeti to return the infant. His sacrifice appeases the mother Yeti, allowing Ellie to safely escape the wilderness by boat.

== Cast ==
- Brittany Allen as Ellie Bannister, a crippled cartographer
- William Sadler as Hollis Bannister, an adventurer & cartographer who disappeared without a trace
- Corbin Bernsen as Merriell Sunday Sr., an oil tycoon who disappeared without a trace
- Heather Lind as Marianne, Margaret's sister and Merriell, Sr.'s girlfriend
- Jim Cummings as Booker, the radio man
- Eric Nelsen as Merriell Sunday Jr.
- Christina Bennett Lind as Margaret Lamb, the rescue team's zoologist (cryptozoologist),
- Elizabeth Cappuccino as Belle Parker, aide to Merriel, Jr.,
- Gene Gallereano as Daniel 'Dynamite' Hewitt,
- Zach Franklin as Bennett

== Production ==
Gene Gallerano and William Pisciotta directed and wrote the film, in their feature directorial debuts. Johnathan Brownlee and Ross Meyerson produced the film under their Torfoot Entertainment Group production company. Jim Cummings was cast in the film by October 2024. On January 16, 2025, Brittany Allen, Eric Nelsen, Corbin Bernsen, and William Sadler were added to the cast of the film. Principal photography began at Buffalo, New York on January 20, and wrapped on February 17, with Joel Froome as the cinematographer. The creature design for the film was done by Wayne Anderson and Ali Gordon. The stunt coordinator and second unit director was provided by Freddie Poole. Frank Coppola was the production designer for the film. Christina Bennett Lind edited the film. John Hunter composed the score for the film.

== Release ==
Radiant Films acquired the international sales to the film at the American Film Market. The film has been sold to Plaion Pictures for the United Kingdom, Germany, and Italy, Aqua Pinema for Turkey, Empire Networks for India, Phoenicia Pictures for the Middle East, and Rialto Distribution for Australia and New Zealand. Well Go USA Entertainment released the film theatrically at AMC Theaters on April 4 and 8, 2026, before releasing on digital platforms on April 10. The film had its world premiere at Beyond Fest Chicago on April 3.

== Reception ==
On the review aggregator website Rotten Tomatoes, 44% of 25 critics' reviews are positive.
