= Ekkeland Götze =

German artist

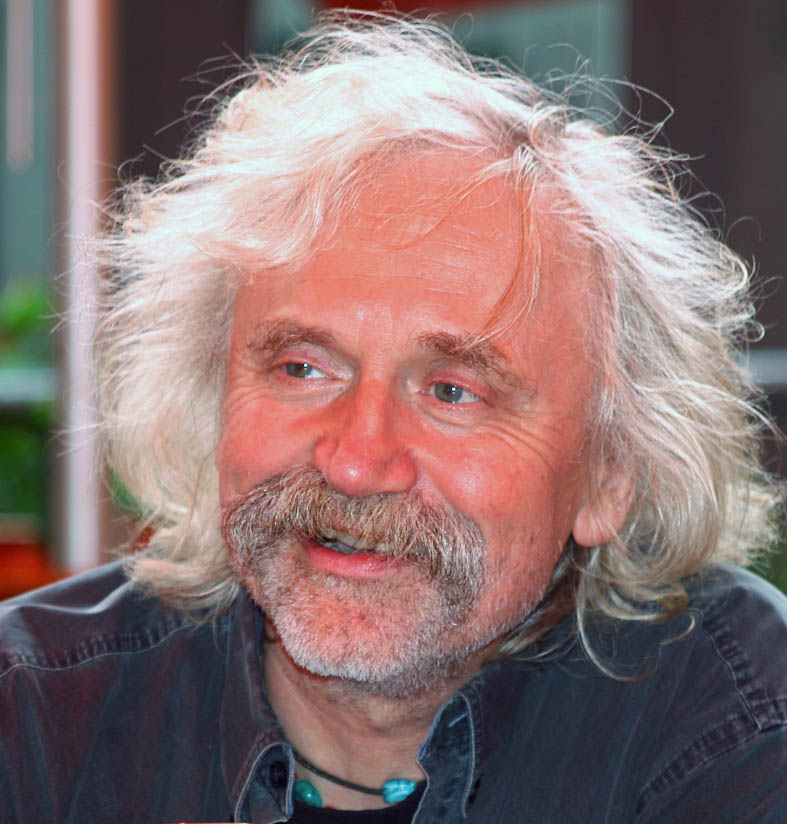
- Ekkeland Götze
- Born: Ekkehard Götze; August 14, 1948 (age 78); Dresden, Germany
- Education: Dresden Academy of Fine Arts
- Website: ekkeland.de

Ekkeland Götze (born August 14, 1948) is a German painter, printmaker and conceptual artist.

== Life ==
Götze was born in Dresden on August 14, 1948. After a training as a screen printer he educated himself as an industrial engineer through a correspondence course. He was not allowed to study painting since he was lacking the "Abitur" educational achievement, but Gerhard Kettner, president of the Dresden Academy of Fine Arts, provided him with a teaching assignment for screen printing anyway. Götze painted in his spare time, but he was not allowed to exhibit because of regulations in East Germany - formally he was a printmaker, not a painter. Because of these restrictions he filed an application for an exit permit 1985 which was granted in 1988. He immediately moved from Dresden to Munich, West Germany, where he opened up a printshop for artists. He is also co-owner of a garment company.

== Works ==
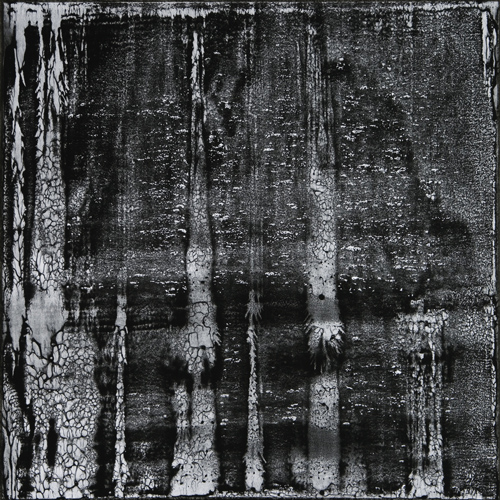
Terragraphy No. 643: Warumungu (Tennant Creek, Australia)

In 1989 Götze started to work on a project called "Erde" ("Earth"). He collects soil samples at extraordinary sites of human history around the world and applies them to paper, lime mortar or other backgrounds, making use of a standardized, self-developed technique he calls "terragraphy": He grinds the soil, mixes it with a binder and then applies it making use of a technique similar to screen printing. All backgrounds are square and of identical size. For each site the resulting works of art are given an individual name that reflects the importance of the site. According to Götze, the pictures capture th "spirit and energy" of the place where the soil was gathered. German theatre researcher Christopher Balme described Götzes role during the emergence of his works as that of a "medium in a shamanistic sense". During the course of the project, Götze visited various European and North American countries as well as e.g. Australia, Brazil, Egypt, Japan, Madagascar, New Zealand, South Africa, Tibet and Venezuela. In addition to the prints Götzes uses photos of the sites to contextualize the prints. Between 1990 and 2001, Götze compiled and published 13 artist's books depicting the "Erde" works, one site per book. For the book about New Zealand he cooperated with local artist Christina Wirihana. In 2014 he designed an album cover for German jazz trio Kolb Schindler Schubert.

Götze runs a studio in Sendling. He is a member of the Neue Gruppe, an association of Munich artists regularly exhibiting at the Haus der Kunst museum. In 2018 Götze has been awarded the Seerosenpreis, a yearly award assigned to visual artists by the city of Munich.

== Exhibitions ==
=== Solo exhibitions ===
- 2009: Bild der Erde (Berlin, Federal Foreign Office)
- 2011: Das Bild der Erde (Munich, vernissage in the Center for Advanced Studies at LMU Munich)
- 2012: Goethe-Institut, Tokyo, Japan
- 2017: Erde und Licht (Maloja, Chiesa Bianca di Maloja)
- 2022: Bild der Erde (Museum of Man and Nature, Munich)

=== Group exhibitions ===
- 2006: 4th International Artist’s Book Triennial, Vilnius
- 2009: Made in Munich: Munich Editions 1968-2008 (Munich, Haus der Kunst)
- 2012: Possible Water (Tokyo, Goethe-Institut Tokyo, with i.a. Agnes Meyer-Brandis)
- 2017: Faktor X (Munich, Haus der Kunst, with i.a. Tamiko Thiel)
