= Hindu Mahasabha =

Hindutva political party in India

Akhil Bharatiya Hindu Mahasabha
- Founder: Madan Mohan Malaviya
- Founded: 1915; 111 years ago (as organisation); 1933; 93 years ago (as political party)
- Split from: Indian National Congress
- Headquarters: New Delhi
- Newspaper: Kesari
- Paramilitary wing: Ram Sena (Note: transl. Army of Rama)
- Ideology: Hindutva; Hindu nationalism Ultranationalism; Social conservatism National conservatism Economic nationalism Right-wing populism
- Political position: Far-right
- Colours: Saffron
- ECI status: Registered Unrecognised
- Seats in Rajya Sabha: 0 / 245
- Seats in Lok Sabha: 0 / 543
- Seats in State Legislative Assembly: 0 / 4,036
- Seats in State Legislative Council: 0 / 426
- Number of states and union territories in government: 0 / 31 (Collectively 28 States & 3 UTs)

Election symbol
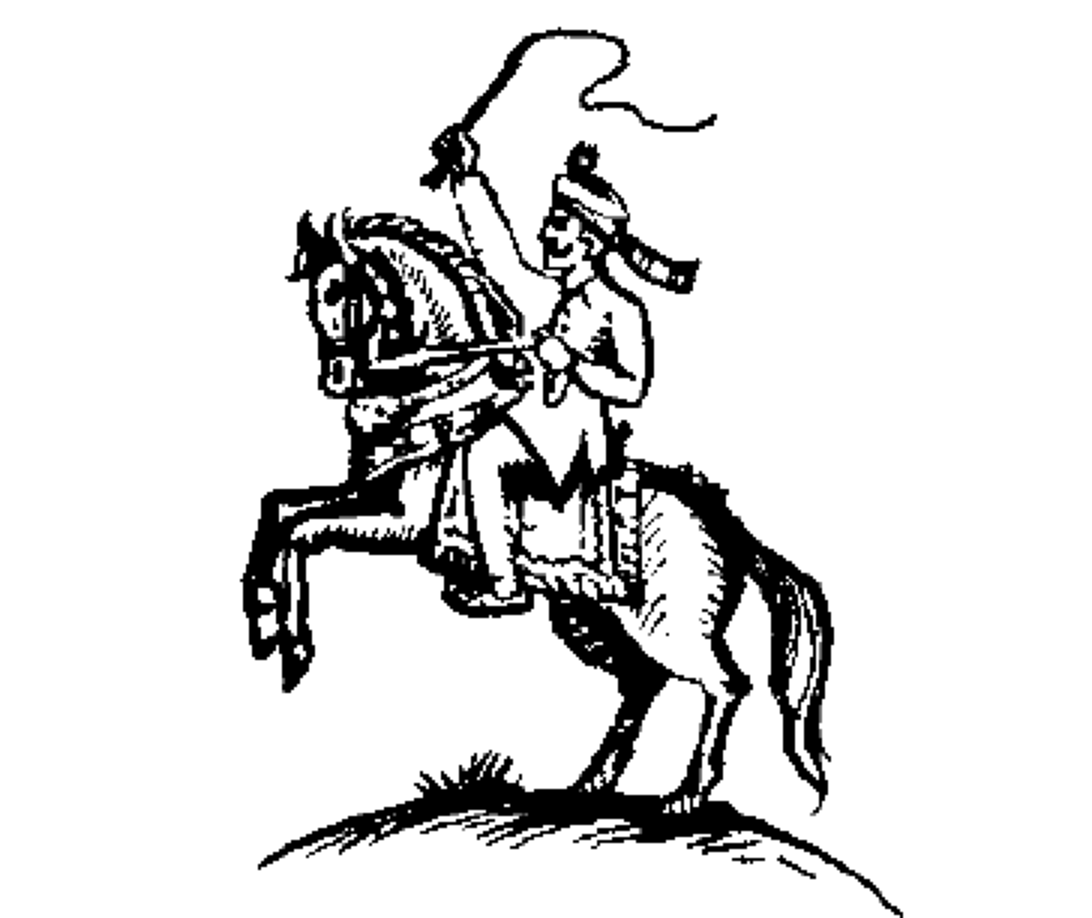

Party flag
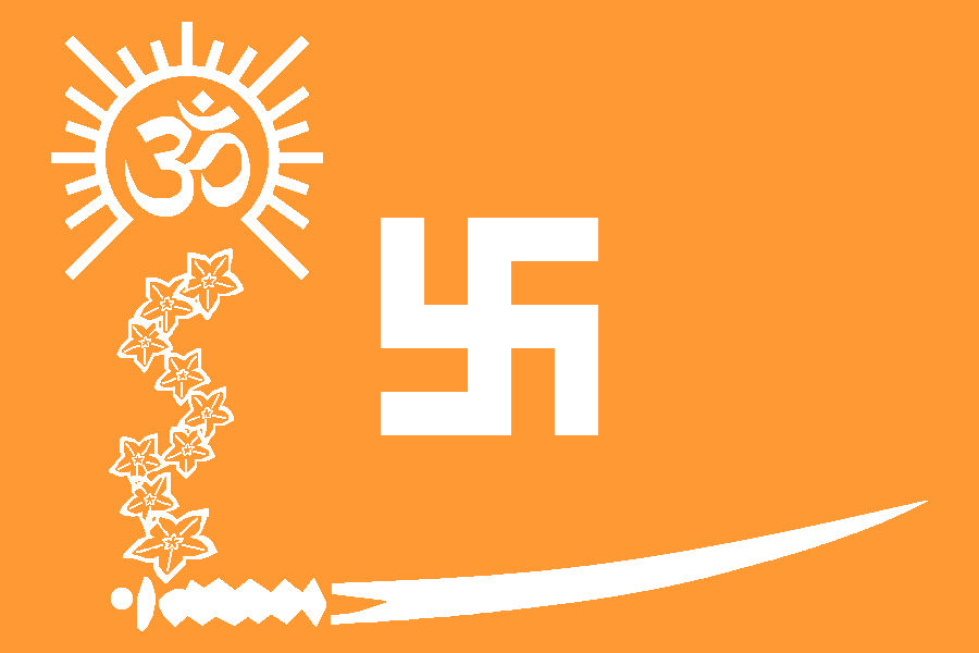

Website
- abhm.org.in

A group photo taken in Shimoga in 1944 when Vinayak Damodar Savarkar (seated fourth from right, second row) came to address the State-level Hindu Mahasabha conference. The late Bhoopalam Chandrashekariah, president of the Hindu Mahasabha State unit, is seated to Savarkar's left.

Akhil Bharatiya Hindu Mahasabha (lit. 'All-India Hindu Grand Assembly'), simply known as the Hindu Mahasabha, is a far-right Hindutva political party in India.

Founded in 1915 by Madan Mohan Malviya, the Mahasabha functioned mainly as a pressure group advocating the interests of orthodox Hindus before the British Raj from within the Indian National Congress. In the 1930s, it emerged as a distinct party under the leadership of Vinayak Damodar Savarkar, who developed the ideology of Hindutva and became a fierce opponent of the secular nationalism espoused by the Congress.

During World War II, the Mahasabha supported the British war effort and briefly entered coalitions with the Muslim League in provincial and central legislative councils. They opposed the integration of the princely states into India. The assassination of Indian leader Mahatma Gandhi was perpetrated by the Hindu Mahasabha member Nathuram Godse. The Mahasabha's fortunes diminished in post-Independence Indian politics, and it was soon eclipsed by the Bharatiya Jana Sangh.

== Name ==
The organisation was originally called Sarvadeshik Hindu Sabha ("Pan-Country Hindu Assembly"). In 1921, it changed to the present name Akhil Bharatiya Hindu Mahasabha ("All-India Hindu Grand Assembly").

== History ==
=== Antecedents ===
Local forerunners of the Hindu Mahasabha emerged in connection with the disputes after the partition of Bengal in 1905 in British India. Under the then viceroy Lord Curzon, the division of the province of Bengal was into two new provinces of East Bengal and Assam, as well as Bengal. The new province of Bengal had a Hindu majority, the province of East Bengal and Assam was mostly Muslim. The British administration justified the division for religious reasons.

The formation of the All India Muslim League in 1906 and the British India government's creation of separate Muslim electorate under the Morley-Minto reforms of 1909 was a catalyst for Hindu leaders coming together to create an organisation to protect the rights of the Hindu community members.

In 1909, Lal Chand and U.N. Mukerji established the Punjab Hindu Sabha ("Punjab Hindu Assembly"). The Sabha stated that it was not a sectarian organisation, but an "all-embracing movement" that aimed to safeguard the interests of "the entire Hindu community". On 21–22 October 1909, it organised the Punjab Provincial Hindu Conference, which criticised the Indian National Congress for failing to defend Hindu interests and called for the promotion of Hindu-centered politics. In this conference, Sabha leaders strongly proposed that Hindus need a separate nation and that Muslims should not be given any rights in that nation. The Sabha organised five more annual provincial conferences in Punjab.

The development of the broad civic framework for Hindu unity that started in the early 20th century in Punjab was a precursor for the formation of the All India Hindu Sabha. Over the next few years, several such Hindu Sabhas were established outside Punjab, including in United Provinces, Bihar, Bengal, Central Provinces and Berar, and Bombay Presidency.

A formal move to establish an umbrella All-India Hindu Sabha was made at the Allahabad session of Congress in 1910. A committee headed by Lala Baij Nath was set up to draw a constitution, but it did not make much progress. Another conference of Hindu leaders in Allahabad also took the initial step to establish an All India Hindu Sabha in 1910, but this organisation did not become operational due to factional strife. On 8 December 1913, the Punjab Hindu Sabha passed a resolution to create an All India Hindu Sabha at its Ambala session. The Conference proposed holding a general conference of Hindu leaders from all over India during 1915 Kumbh Mela in Haridwar.

=== Establishment ===
Preparatory sessions of the All India Hindu Sabha were held at Haridwar (13 February 1915), Lucknow (17 February 1915) and Delhi (27 February 1915). In April 1915, Sarvadeshak (All India) Hindu Sabha was formed as an umbrella organisation of regional Hindu Sabhas, at the Kumbh Mela in Haridwar. Gandhi and Swami Shraddhanand were also present at the conference and were supportive of the formation of All India Hindu Sabha. The Sabha emphasised Hindu solidarity and the need for social reform.

At its sixth session in April 1921, the Sarvadeshak Hindu Sabha formally changed its name to Akhil Bharat Hindu Mahasabha on the model of the Indian National Congress. Presided over by Manindra Chandra Nandi, it amended its constitution to remove the clause about loyalty to the British and added a clause committing the organisation to a "united and self-governing" Indian nation.

Amongst the Mahasabha's early leaders were the prominent nationalists, educationalists and four-time Indian National Congress president Pandit Madan Mohan Malaviya, who founded the Benaras Hindu University, the Punjabi populist Lala Lajpat Rai and Lajpat Rai's mentor Navin Chandra Rai of the Hindu Samaj who chaired the special Congress session of 1920 held at Lahore which gave the call for non-cooperation. Under Malaviya, the Mahasabha campaigned for Hindu political unity, for the education and economic development of Hindus as well as for the conversion of Muslims to Hinduism.

=== Indian independence movement ===
The Hindu Mahasabha did not unconditionally support the Indian independence movement against British rule in India. However, it became part of the movement on its conditions and with regards to protecting the interests of the Hindus. For example, it boycotted the Simon Commission. In the aftermath, it was part of the all-party committee, which came out with the Nehru Report. However, it did not accept the Report as according to Mahasabha, it gave too many concessions to Muslims. Similarly, when Mahatma Gandhi observed a fast against the Communal Award, Mahasabha worked with Gandhi and other parties to ensure Poona Pact was signed and Depressed Classes were given a fair representation.

Hindu Mahasabha opposed the Quit India Movement. Under Savarkar's leadership, the party organised Hindu Militarisation Boards which recruited for the British Indian armed forces in World War 2.

==== Civil disobedience movement ====
Under the leadership of Mahatma Gandhi, the Congress led several nationwide campaigns of non-violent civil disobedience. The Mahasabha officially abstained from participating in the Civil Disobedience Movement of 1930.

==== Alliance with Muslim League and others ====
The Indian National Congress won a massive victory in the 1937 Indian provincial elections, decimating the Hindu Mahasabha. However, in 1939, the Congress ministries resigned in protest against Viceroy Lord Linlithgow's action of declaring India to be a belligerent in the Second World War without consulting the Indian people. This led to the Hindu Mahasabha joining hands with the Muslim League and other parties to form governments, in certain provinces. Such coalition governments were formed in Sindh, NWFP, and Bengal.

In Sindh, Hindu Mahasabha members joined Ghulam Hussain Hidayatullah's Muslim League government. In Savarkar's own words:

Witness the fact that only recently in Sind, the Sind-Hindu-Sabha on invitation had taken the responsibility of joining hands with the League itself in running coalition government...

In March 1943, Sindh Government became the first Provincial Assembly of the sub-continent to pass an official resolution in favour of the creation of Pakistan. Despite the Hindu Mahasabha's avowed public opposition to any territorial division of India, the Mahasabha Ministers of the Sindh government did not resign, rather they simply "contented themselves with a protest".

In the North West Frontier Province, Hindu Mahasabha members joined hands with Sardar Aurang Zeb Khan of the Muslim League to form a government in 1943. The Mahasabha member of the cabinet was Finance Minister Mehr Chand Khanna.

In Bengal, Hindu Mahasabha joined the Krishak Praja Party led Progressive Coalition ministry of A. K. Fazlul Huq in December 1941. Savarkar appreciated the successful functioning of the coalition government.

==== Quit India Movement ====
The Hindu Mahasabha openly opposed the call for the Quit India Movement and boycotted it officially. Vinayak Damodar Savarkar, the president of the Hindu Mahasabha at that time, even went to the extent of writing a letter titled "Stick to your Posts", in which he instructed Hindu Sabhaites who happened to be "members of municipalities, local bodies, legislatures or those serving in the army...to stick to their posts" across the country, and not to join the Quit India Movement at any cost.

Following the Hindu Mahasabha's official decision to boycott the Quit India movement, Syama Prasad Mukherjee, leader of the Hindu Mahasabha in Bengal (which was a part of the ruling coalition in Bengal led by Krishak Praja Party of Fazlul Haq), wrote a letter to the British Government as to how they should respond, if the Congress gave a call to the British rulers to Quit India. In this letter, dated July 26, 1942, he wrote:

Let me now refer to the situation that may be created in the province as a result of any widespread movement launched by the Congress. Anybody, who during the war, plans to stir up mass feeling, resulting in internal disturbances or insecurity, must be resisted by any Government that may function for the time being.

Mookerjee in this letter reiterated that the Fazlul Haq led Bengal Government, along with its alliance partner Hindu Mahasabha would make every possible effort to defeat the Quit India Movement in the province of Bengal and made a concrete proposal as regards this:

The question is how to combat this movement (Quit India) in Bengal? The administration of the province should be carried on in such a manner that in spite of the best efforts of the Congress, this movement will fail to take root in the province. It should be possible for us, especially responsible Ministers, to be able to tell the public that the freedom for which the Congress has started the movement, already belongs to the representatives of the people. In some spheres, it might be limited during the emergency. Indians have to trust the British, not for the sake for Britain, not for any advantage that the British might gain, but for the maintenance of the defence and freedom of the province itself. You, as Governor, will function as the constitutional head of the province and will be guided entirely on the advice of your Minister.

Even the Indian historian R.C. Majumdar noted this fact and states:

Syama Prasad ended the letter with a discussion of the mass movement organised by the Congress. He expressed the apprehension that the movement would create internal disorder and will endanger internal security during the war by exciting popular feeling and he opined that any government in power has to suppress it, but that according to him could not be done only by persecution... In that letter, he mentioned item-wise the steps to be taken for dealing with the situation...

=== Princely states ===
Hindu Mahasabha took funding from the princely states and supported them to remain independent even after the independence of India. Savarkar particularly hailed the Hindu dominated states as the 'bedrock of Hindu power' and defended their despotic powers, referring to them as the 'citadels of organised Hindu power'. He particularly hailed the princely states such as Mysore State, Travancore, Oudh and Baroda State as 'progressive Hindu states'.

=== Pakistan debate ===
During the time when discussions surrounding the creation of Pakistan were coming to a head, some leaders of the Hindu Mahasabha advocated dividing Bengal for a second time(first was the partition of Bengal in 1905) on religious grounds, arguing that in a unified Bengal, Hindus would remain vulnerable to the dominance of the province's Muslim majority.

Dr B.R. Ambedkar writes in his book Pakistan or the Partition of India,

Strange as it may appear, Mr. Savarkar and Mr. Jinnah instead of being opposed to each other on the one nation versus two nations issue are in complete agreement about it. Both agree, not only agree but insist that there are two nations in India—one the Muslim nation and the other the Hindu nation. They differ only as regards the terms and conditions on which the two nations should live. Mr. Jinnah says India should be cut up into two, Pakistan and Hindustan, the Muslim nation to occupy Pakistan and the Hindu nation to occupy Hindustan. Mr. Savarkar on the other hand insists that, although there are two nations in India, India shall not be divided into two parts, one for Muslims and the other for the Hindus ; that the two nations shall dwell in one country and shall live under the mantle of one single constitution; that the constitution shall be such that the Hindu nation will be enabled to occupy a predominant position that is due to it and the Muslim nation made to live in the position of subordinate co-operation with the Hindu nation.

Dr. Ambedkar ends up calling the idea illogical, even if bold and clear.

=== Assassination of Mahatma Gandhi ===
On 30 January 1948, Nathuram Godse assassinated Mahatma Gandhi in New Delhi. Godse and his fellow conspirators Digambar Badge, Gopal Godse, Narayan Apte, Vishnu Karkare and Madanlal Pahwa were identified as prominent members of the Hindu Mahasabha. Along with them, police arrested Savarkar, who was suspected of being the mastermind behind the plot. While the trial resulted in convictions and judgments against the others, Savarkar was released due to lack of evidence. The Kapur Commission said:

All these facts taken together were destructive of any theory other than the conspiracy to murder (of Gandhiji).

=== Attempts at rehabilitation of Godse ===
The Hindu Mahasabha considers Nathuram Godse to be a "real forgotten hero" of the independence struggle of India and criticises Mahatma Gandhi for not having prevented the partition of India. In 2014, following the Bharatiya Janata Party's rise to power, the Hindu Mahasabha continued attempts to rehabilitate and portray him as a patriot. It requested Prime Minister Narendra Modi to install the bust of Nathuram Godse. It created a documentary film Desh Bhakt Nathuram Godse (Patriot Nathuram Godse) for release on the death anniversary of Gandhi on 30 January 2015. There were attempts to build a temple for Nathuram Godse and to celebrate 30 January as a Shaurya Diwas ("Bravery Day"). A civil suit was filed in Pune Court asking for a ban on the documentary film.

=== Karnataka controversy ===
In September 2021, the state general secretary for Hindu Mahasabha in Karnataka, Dharmendra, threatened to kill Karnataka Chief Minister Basavaraj Bommai over the demolition of an unlicensed temple in Nanjangud, Mysuru, along with comments about killing Mahatma Gandhi. For these threats, he and two other associates, Rajesh Pavitran and Prem Poolali, were arrested.

== Ideology ==
Although the Hindu Mahasabha did not call for the exclusion of other religious communities from government, it identified India as a Hindu Rashtra ("Hindu Nation") and believed in the primacy of Hindu culture, religion, and heritage. The Hindu Mahasabha was opposed to the Indian caste system and policies that endorsed untouchability, and used to organise all caste dinners in Nagpur and Kanpur.

=== Hindutva ===
The Hindu Mahasabha promotes the principles of Hindutva, a Hindu nationalist ideology developed by its pre-eminent leader Vinayak Damodar Savarkar. The Mahasabha identifies India as Hindu Rashtra ("Hindu Nation").

=== Ideological positions ===
In 2015, Vice President of All India Hindu Mahasabha, VP Sadhvi Deva Thakur stated that Christians and Muslims must undergo forced sterilisation to restrict their growing population in India, which she considered a threat to Hindus. She declared: "The population of Muslims and Christians is growing day by day. To rein in this, Union will have to impose emergency, and Muslims and Christians will have to be forced to undergo sterilisation so that they can't increase their numbers".

== Electoral history ==
=== Electoral history in Lok Sabha ===
Year	Legislature	Seats won	Change in seats	Outcome	Ref.
1951	1st Lok Sabha	4 / 489	▲4	Opposition
1957	2nd Lok Sabha	2 / 494	▼2	Opposition
1962	3rd Lok Sabha	1 / 494	▼1	Opposition
1967	4th Lok Sabha	1 / 520	Steady	Opposition
1971	5th Lok Sabha	0 / 518	▼1	-
1977	6th Lok Sabha	0 / 542	Steady	-
1980	7th Lok Sabha	0 / 542	Steady	-
1984	8th Lok Sabha	0 / 533	Steady	-
1989	9th Lok Sabha	1 / 545	▲1	Opposition
1991	10th Lok Sabha	0 / 545	▼1	-
1996	11th Lok Sabha	0 / 545	Steady	-
1998	12th Lok Sabha	0 / 545	Steady	-
1999	13th Lok Sabha	0 / 545	Steady	-
2004	14th Lok Sabha	0 / 543	Steady	-
2009	15th Lok Sabha	0 / 543	Steady	-
2014	16th Lok Sabha	0 / 543	Steady	-
2019	17th Lok Sabha	0 / 543	Steady	-
2024	18th Lok Sabha	0 / 543	Steady	-

=== Electoral history in State Election ===
==== Assembly election history ====
Year	Seats contested	Seats won	±	No. of Votes	Voteshare (%)	± (%)	Outcome
Uttar Pradesh
1969		1 / 425	▲1	67,807	0.29%		Other
1974		1 / 424	Steady	81,829	0.3%		Other
In 1977, 1980, 1985, 1989, 1991, 1993, 1996 Hindu Mahasabha contested but didn't win any seats
2002		1 / 403	▲1				Other
In 2007, 2012, 2017, 2022 Hindu Mahasabha contested but didn't win any seats

== See also ==
- List of political parties in India
- Bharatiya Janata Party
- List of Hindu nationalist political parties
- Rashtriya Swayamsevak Sangh
- Sangh Parivar
- Chakrapani (politician)

== Sources ==
- Bapu, Prabhu (2013). Hindu Mahasabha in Colonial North India, 1915-1930: Constructing Nation and History (1st ed.). London and New York: Routledge. ISBN 978-0415671651.
- Gordon, Richard (2008) [1975]. "The Hindu Mahasabha and the Indian National Congress, 1915 to 1926". Modern Asian Studies. 9 (2). Cambridge and New York: Cambridge University Press: 145–203. doi:10.1017/S0026749X00004960. ISSN 1469-8099. JSTOR 311959. S2CID 144467731.
- Jaffrelot, Christophe (2011). Religion, Caste, and Politics in India. C Hurst & Co. ISBN 978-1849041386.
- Jha, Mithilesh K. (2018). "Hindu Mahasabha". In Long, Jeffery D.; Sherma, Rita D.; Jain, Pankai; Khanna, Madhu (eds.). Hinduism and Tribal Religions. Encyclopedia of Indian Religions. Dordrecht: Springer Verlag. pp. 1–4. doi:10.1007/978-94-024-1036-5_490-1. ISBN 978-94-024-1036-5.
