= Me Nathuram Godse Boltoy =

Marathi language play by Vinay Apte

- Poster
- Original language: Marathi
- Written by: Pradip Dalvi
- Characters: Nathuram Godse

Premiere
- Directed by: Vinay Apte

Me Nathuram Godse Boltoy is a two-act play written in the Marathi language. It has been written by Pradeep Dalvi (Mauli productions). It is based on the book May It Please You Honour written by Gopal Godse, brother of Mahatma Gandhi's assassin Nathuram Godse. According to Karline McLain the play enacts Godse's defense plea and thus explores Gandhi's assassination and the trial of Nathuram from Godse's point of view.

== Staging and controversies ==
In 1989, Dalvi was denied permission by the Government of Maharashtra to stage the play. The play was first staged in 1997. It ran 13 successful shows but was banned thereafter, by the governments of Maharashtra and Kerala. The producer approached the high court in 1998, which permitted staging the play in 2001. The Supreme Court upheld the high court's ruling. It was staged in Thane's auditorium Gadkari Rangayatan in April 2001 facing opposition from parties like Indian National Congress and Nationalist Congress Party; it was not presented again in Thane until 2011. An Indian Express news story quotes director Vinay Apte regarding the intimidation that artists connected with the play faced, such as the incident when the bus used by the artists while touring was set on fire by Indian National Congress activists in Mulund a suburb of Mumbai. Despite this 627 shows were staged in other cities. In February 2011, the play re-opened to a packed house at the same Gadkari Rangayatan, in Thane. Two platoons of state reserve police and 350 regular policemen under the direction of senior officers provided security. According to Tushar Gandhi, Gandhi's great-grandson, the play creates martyrs of murderers who after "murdering him (Mohandas Karamchand Gandhi) are now trying to murder his memory". It starred Sharad Ponkshe as Nathuram Godse.

== Criticism ==
Both the play and its ban have been criticized by Shriram Lagoo a view which was considered representative of the views of other theater workers such as Vijay Tendulkar, Satyadev Dubey and Amol Palekar by The Times of India in its article Banning a play is not the solution. Civil liberties activists have opposed the ban though they consider the play "vicious".

=== Nathuramayan ===
Yashawant Dinkar Phadke in his book Nathuramayan has criticised Dalvi's play as presenting "distorted and falsified facts". Political activists opposing the play have urged Dalvi to answer questions put forward by Phadke in Nathuramayan.

== See also ==
- List of artistic depictions of Mahatma Gandhi
