= Assassination of Mahatma Gandhi =

1948 murder in New Delhi, India

Coordinates: 28°36′04.6″N 77°12′49.4″E

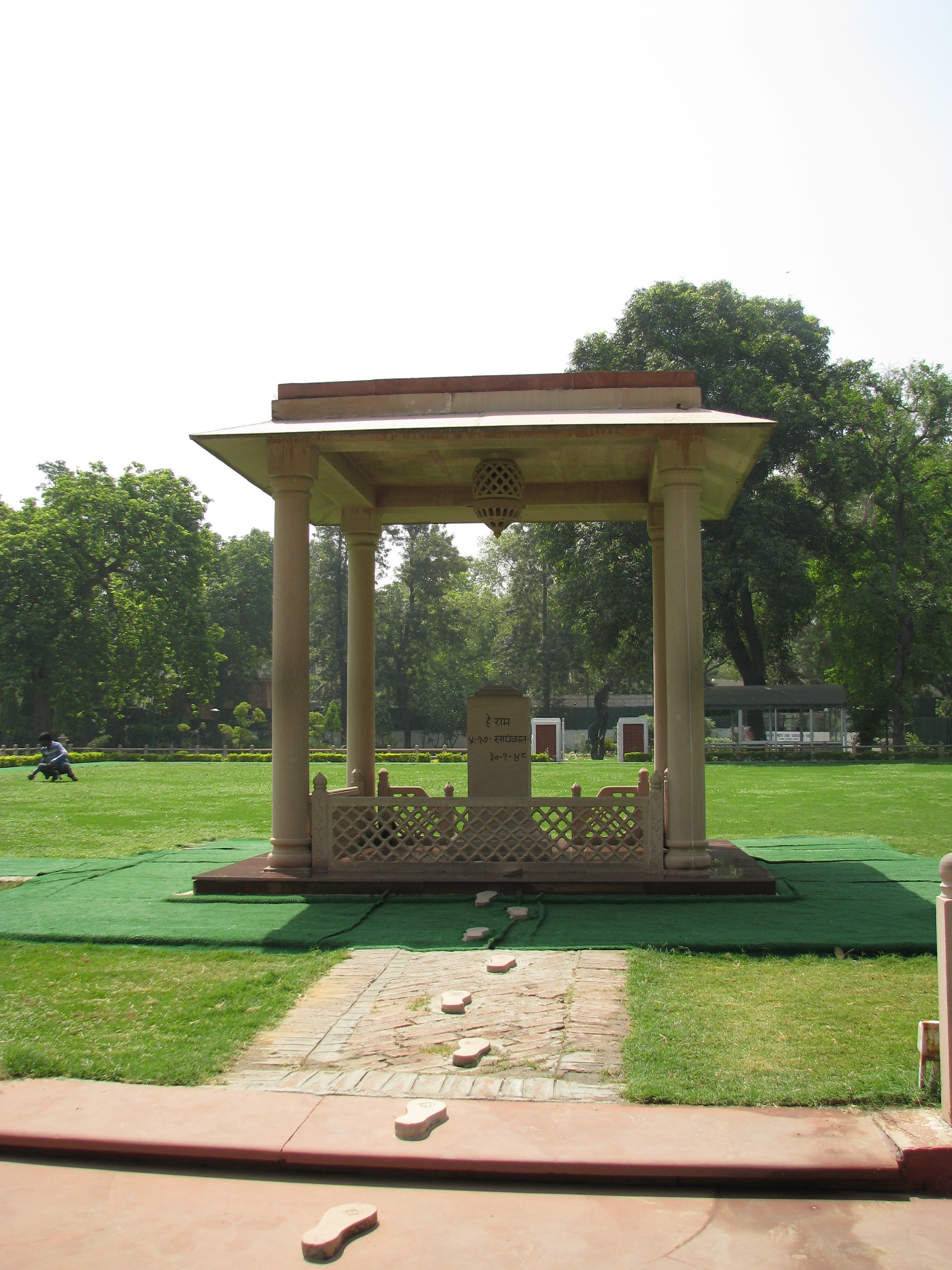
- A memorial marks the spot in Birla House (now Gandhi Smriti), New Delhi, where Mahatma Gandhi was assassinated at 5:17 PM on 30 January 1948.
- Location: New Delhi, India
- Date: 30 January 1948; 17:17 (IST)
- Target: Mahatma Gandhi
- Attack type: Assassination, murder by shooting
- Weapon: Beretta M 1934 semi-automatic pistol
- Deaths: 1 (Gandhi)
- Perpetrators: Nathuram Godse; Narayan Apte; Dattatraya Parchure; Vishnu Karkare; Madanlal Pahwa; Gopal Godse
- Accused: Digambar Badge (granted immunity); Shankar Kistaiya (acquitted on appeal); Vinayak Damodar Savarkar (acquitted)
- Convictions: Murder
- Sentence: Godse and Apte: Death by hanging Other conspirators: Life imprisonment

Mahatma Gandhi was assassinated on 30 January 1948 at the age of 78 in the compound of The Birla House (now Gandhi Smriti), a large mansion in central New Delhi. His assassin was Nathuram Godse, from Pune, Maharastra a right-wing Hindu nationalist, with a history of association with the Rashtriya Swayamsevak Sangh (RSS), a right-wing Hindu paramilitary organization, and with membership in the Hindu Mahasabha.

Sometime after 5 PM, according to witnesses, Gandhi had reached the top of the stairs leading to the raised lawn behind Birla House where he had been conducting multi-faith prayer meetings every evening. As Gandhi began to walk toward the dais, Godse stepped out of the crowd flanking Gandhi's path, and fired three bullets into Gandhi's chest and stomach at point-blank range. Gandhi fell to the ground. He was carried back to his room in Birla House from which a representative emerged sometime later to announce his death. (Note: Quote: "Mr. Gandhi was picked up by attendants and carried rapidly back to the unpretentious bedroom where he had passed most of his working and sleeping hours. As he was taken through the door Hindu onlookers who could see him began to wail and beat their breasts. Less than half an hour later a member of Mr. Gandhi's entourage came out of the room and said to those about the door: "Bapu (father) is finished." But it was not until Mr. Gandhi's death was announced by All India Radio, at 6 pm that the words spread widely."Trumbull (1948))

Godse was captured by members of the crowd—the most widely reported of whom was Herbert Reiner Jr., a vice-consul at the American embassy in Delhi—and handed over to the police. The Gandhi murder trial opened in May 1948 in Delhi's historic Red Fort, with Godse the main defendant, and his collaborator Narayan Apte, and six more, deemed co-defendants. The trial was rushed through, the haste sometimes attributed to the Minister of Home Vallabhbhai Patel's desire "to avoid scrutiny for the failure to prevent the assassination." Godse and Apte were sentenced to death on 8 November 1949. Although pleas for commutation were made by Gandhi's two sons, Manilal Gandhi and Ramdas Gandhi, they were turned down by Prime Minister of India Jawaharlal Nehru, deputy prime minister Vallabhbhai Patel, and Governor-General C. Rajagopalachari. Godse and Apte were hanged in the Ambala jail on 15 November 1949.

== Preparations ==
In May 1944, Nathuram Godse attempted to assassinate Gandhi with a knife. He led a group of 15 to 20 young men who rushed at Gandhi during a prayer meeting at Panchgani. Godse and his group were prevented by the crowds from reaching Gandhi. He was released due to Gandhi's own policy of declining to press criminal charges.

In September 1944, Godse again led another group to block Gandhi's passage from Sevagram to Mumbai. This time Godse was arrested with a dagger and he uttered threats to kill Gandhi. He was released again owing to Gandhi's policy of not pressing criminal charges.

In early September 1947, Gandhi moved to Delhi to help stem the violent rioting there and in the neighbouring province of East Punjab. The rioting had come in the wake of the Partition of India, which had accompanied the creation of the new independent dominions of India and Pakistan, and involved large, chaotic transfers of population between them. (Note: "Communal massacres sparked a chaotic two-way flight of Hindus and Sikhs from Pakistan and Muslims from India. In all an estimated 15 million people were displaced in what became the largest forced migration in the twentieth century".)

Godse and his assassination accomplices were residents of the Deccan region. Godse had previously led a civil disobedience movement against Mir Osman Ali Khan, the Muslim ruler of the princely Deccan region dominion of Hyderabad State in British India. Godse joined a protest march in 1938 in Hyderabad, He was arrested for political crimes and served a prison sentence. Once he was out of prison, Godse continued his civil disobedience and worked as a journalist reporting the sufferings of Hindu refugees escaping from Pakistan, and during the various religious riots that erupted in the 1940s.

Plans to assassinate Gandhi were initiated by Godse and his accomplices in January 1948, after India and Pakistan had already started a war over Kashmir. Jawaharlal Nehru had held up a payment to the belligerent Pakistan as part of the post-Partition division of funds of British India. But Gandhi opposed the decision and went on a fast-unto-death on 13 January 1948 to pressure the Government of India to release the payment to Pakistan. The Government of India, yielding to Gandhi, reversed its decision. Godse and his colleagues interpreted this sequence of events to be a case of Mahatma Gandhi controlling power and hurting India.

On the day Gandhi went on hunger strike, Godse and his colleagues began planning how to assassinate Gandhi. Nathuram Godse and Narayan Apte purchased a Beretta M1934. Along with purchasing the pistol, Godse and his accomplices shadowed Gandhi's movements.

== Assassination attempt on 20 January 1948 ==
Gandhi had initially been staying at the Balmiki Temple, near Gole Market in the northern part of New Delhi, and was holding his prayer meetings there. When the temple was requisitioned for sheltering refugees of the partition he moved to Birla House, a large mansion on what was then Albuquerque Road in south-central New Delhi, not far from the diplomatic enclave. Gandhi was living in two unpretentious rooms in the left wing of Birla House, and conducting prayer meetings on a raised lawn behind the mansion.

The first attempt to assassinate Gandhi at Birla House occurred on 20 January 1948. According to Stanley Wolpert, Nathuram Godse and his colleagues followed Gandhi to a park where he was speaking. One of them threw a grenade away from the crowd. The loud explosion scared the crowd, creating a chaotic stampede of people. Gandhi was left alone on the speakers' platform. The original assassination plan was to throw a second grenade, after the crowds had run away, at the isolated Gandhi but the alleged accomplice, Digambar Badge, lost his courage, did not throw the second grenade and ran away with the crowd. All of the assassination plotters ran away, except Madanlal Pahwa who was a Punjabi refugee of the Partition of India. He was arrested.

== 30 January 1948 ==
=== Manuben Gandhi ===
Manu (Mridula) Gandhi, called "Manuben" in Gujarati fashion, was Mahatma Gandhi's great niece (more precisely, a first cousin twice removed). She had come to join Gandhi's entourage during his peace mission to Noakhali in East Bengal, which had been gripped by communal violence. Abha Chatterjee (Abhaben Chatterjee) was a girl adopted by the Gandhis who would later marry Gandhi's nephew, Kanu Gandhi. Both young women were walking with Gandhi when he was assassinated. According to Last Glimpses Of Bapu, a memoir by Manuben Gandhi published in 1962, Mahatma Gandhi (Bapu) started the day in Birla House by listening to a recitation of the Bhagavad Gita. He then worked on a Congress constitution he wanted to publish in the Harijan (magazine), had his bath and massage at 8 a.m., and reprimanded Manuben to take care of herself since her health was not what it should be for an 18-year-old. Gandhi, aged 78, was weighed after his bath and was 109.5 pounds (49.7 kg). He then ate lunch with Pyarelalji discussing Noakhali riots. After lunch, states Manuben, Gandhi napped. After waking up, he had a meeting with Sardar Dada. Two Kathiawar leaders wanted to meet him, and when Manuben informed Gandhi that they wanted to meet him, Gandhi replied, "Tell them that, if I remain alive, they can talk to me after the prayer on my walk".

According to Manuben's memoir, the meeting between Vallabhbhai Patel and Gandhi went past the scheduled time and Gandhi was about ten minutes late to the prayer meeting. He began his walk to the prayer location by walking with Manuben to his right and Abha to his left, holding onto them as walking sticks. A stout young man in khaki dress, wrote Manuben, pushed his way through the crowd bent over and with his hands folded. Manuben thought that the man wanted to touch Gandhi's feet. She pushed the man aside, saying, "Bapu is already ten minutes late; why do you embarrass him?" Godse pushed her aside so forcibly that she lost her balance, and the rosary, notebook, and Gandhi's spittoon she was carrying fell out of her hands. She recalled that as she bent to the ground to pick up the items, she heard four shots, resounding booms, and she saw smoke everywhere. Gandhi's hands were folded and he was saying, "Hey Ram...! Hey Ram...!". Abhaben, wrote Manuben, had also fallen down and she saw the assassinated Gandhi in Abhaben's lap.

The pistol shots had deafened her, wrote Manuben, the smoke was very thick, and the incident complete within 3 to 4 minutes. A crowd of people rushed towards them, according to Manuben. The watch she was carrying showed 5:17 p.m. and blood was everywhere on their white clothes. Manuben estimated that it took about ten minutes to carry Gandhi back into the house, and no doctor was available in the meanwhile. They only had a first aid box, but there was no medicine in it for treating Gandhi's wounds. According to Manuben:

the first bullet from the assassin's seven-bore automatic hit the belly 3.5 inches to the right of the middle and 2.5 inches above the navel; the second hit the belly 1 inch away from middle, and the third 4 inches away to the right".

Gandhi had suffered profuse blood loss. Everyone was crying loudly. In the house, Bhai Saheb had phoned the hospital many times, but was unable to reach any help. He then went to Willingdon Hospital in person, but came back disappointed. Manuben and others read the Bhagavad Gita as Gandhi's body lay in the room. Colonel Bhargava arrived, and he pronounced Gandhi dead.

=== Herbert Reiner ===
According to several reports, while the attending crowd was still in shock, Gandhi's assassin Godse was seized by Herbert Reiner Jr., a 32-year-old, newly arrived vice-consul at the American embassy in Delhi. According to an obituary for Reiner published in May 2000 by Los Angeles Times, Reiner's role was reported on the front pages of newspapers around the world. (Note: Quote 1: "As he got to the top of the steps and approached the crowd, he took his arms from the shoulders of his friends and raised his hands in salutation. He was still smiling. A thick-set man, in his 30s I should say and dressed in khaki, was in the forefront of the crowd. He moved a step toward Mr. Gandhi, took out a revolver and fired several shots at almost point-blank range. It did not sound like a revolver but like a Chinese cracker a child might have let off. Mr. Gandhi fell. For a few seconds no one could believe what had happened; every one seemed dazed and numb, and then a young American who had come for prayers rushed forward and seized the shoulders of the man in the khaki coat. That broke the spell.". • Quote 2: In Empirical Foundation of Psychology, the authors, N. H. Pronko and J. W. Bowles introduce Robert Stimson's BBC report about Reiner as a case study, and make the observation: "The preoccupation of the audience with Gandhi's attire and actions as he entered the garden, the disrupting stimulus of Gandhi being shot, the no-response period, the new stimulus in the form of the American, and the frenzied reaction of the crowd combine to trace the sequence in a typical emotional reaction. • Quote 3: "Immediately, there was chaos. As Gandhi was cradled by his devotees and carried back to the house, the assassin was seized and pummeled by thirty-two-year-old diplomatic officer Herbert Reiner of Springdale, Connecticut. A doctor was found within minutes, but he was of no use. Mohandas Karamchand Gandhi was dead." Robert Trumbull of The New York Times, who was an eyewitness to the shooting, wrote in his front-page story the next day:"A crowd of about 500, according to witnesses, was stunned. There was no outcry or excitement for a second or two. Then the onlookers began to push the assassin more as if in bewilderment than in anger. The assassin was seized by Tom Reiner of Lancaster, Mass., a vice consul attached to the American Embassy and a recent arrival in India. He was attending Mr. Gandhi's prayer meeting out of curiosity, as most visitors to New Delhi do at least once. Mr. Reiner grasped the assailant by the shoulders and shoved him toward several police guards. Only then did the crowd begin to grasp what had happened and a forest of fists belabored the assassin as he was dragged toward the pergola where Mr. Gandhi was to have prayed. He left a trail of blood.". • Quote 4: ...the court had authority under Code 540 of the 1898 law to examine Kasar/Damle, which was not done. The government also did not call American Marine Herbert "Tom" Reiner who caught Godse, or the nephew of then Congress Minister Takthmal Jain of Madhya Bharat ministry (1948), who claimed to have heard four shots, or the person who sold the pistol to Godse at Gwalior." • Quote 5: "The unsung hero of the day, however, who wishes to remain anonymous, is an official of the American Embassy at Delhi, who is the first to realize what has happened, and leaps forward and grips the assassin by the arm. If this young American had not done what he did, Nathuram Godse would probably have shot his way out for he still had four unspent bullets in his pistol". • Quote 6: In the melee, no one had really noticed the man who had fired the fatal shots. One man who did was Herbert 'Tom' Reiner Jr, a diplomat who had just joined the US Foreign Service. ... He was standing in the front row when Godse brushed past him and fired the fatal shots. Reiner immediately seized Godse and held him till the police arrived. ... Most newspaper and wire reports on the assassination merely referred to 'an American diplomat' and Reiner's name only appeared in some American newspapers at the time."; • Quote 7: ""Bob tells me that an American Embassy official was the unsung hero of the occasion. He was the first to realize what had happened and to leap forward and grip the assassin by the arms.")

According to Stratton (1950), on January 30, 1948, Reiner had reached Birla House after work, arriving fifteen minutes before the scheduled start of the prayer meeting at 5 p.m., and finding himself in a relatively small crowd. Although there were some armed guards present, Reiner felt that the security measures were inadequate, especially in view of an attempted bomb explosion at the same location ten days before. By the time Gandhi and his small party reached the garden area a few minutes after five, the crowd had swelled to several hundred, which Reiner described as comprising "schoolboys, girls, sweepers, members of the armed services, businessmen, sadhus, holy men, and even vendors displaying pictures of 'Bapu'". At first, Reiner had been at some distance from the path leading to the dais, but he moved forward, explaining later, "An impulse to see more, and at a closer range, of this Indian leader impelled me to move away from the group in which I had been standing to the edge of the terrace steps".

As Gandhi walked briskly up the steps to the lawn, an unidentified man in the crowd spoke up, somewhat insolently in Reiner's recollection, "Gandhiji, you are late." Gandhi slowed, turned towards the man, and gave him an annoyed look as he passed directly in front of Reiner. No sooner had Gandhi reached the top of the steps than another man, a stocky Indian man in his 30s and dressed in khaki clothes, stepped out from the crowd and into Gandhi's path. He soon fired several shots up close, at once felling Gandhi. BBC reporter Robert Stimson, who was present at Birla House, reported in a broadcast that night, "For a few seconds, no one could believe what had happened; everyone seemed dazed and numb. And then a young American who had come for prayers rushed forward and seized the shoulders of the man in the khaki coat. That broke the spell. ... Half a dozen people stooped to lift Gandhi. Others hurled themselves upon the attacker. ... He was overpowered and taken away." Others, as well, described how the crowd seemed paralyzed until Reiner's action. (Note: "The crowd was paralyzed as the two grandchildren lifted the frail Gandhi and carried him into his room in Birla House. Tom Reiner, the United States vice-consul, a newcomer to India, who had attended the prayer meeting, seized the assassin ...")

Robert Trumbull of The New York Times, who was an eyewitness, described Reiner's action in a front-page story on January 31, 1948:

The assassin was seized by Tom Reiner of Lancaster, Mass., a vice consul attached to the American Embassy and a recent arrival in India. ... Mr. Reiner grasped the assailant by the shoulders and shoved him toward several police guards. Only then did the crowd begin to grasp what had happened and a forest of fists belabored the assassin ...

Reiner too had noticed a man in khaki step into the path leading to the dais, but his further view was occluded by a party of associates following Gandhi. He soon heard sounds, though, which in his words were "not loud, not ringing, and not unlike the reports of damp firecrackers ..." and which for a moment made him wonder if some sort of celebration was underway. (Note: Quote 1: "I withdrew somewhat relieved for I had been anticipating a misdirected blow or even a bullet from the angered mob to take vengeance on the culprit. It was some time before the bulk of the people realized what had happened to the side and behind them. Rumors ran rampant. One was to the effect that all shots had gone astray, another that Ava had shielded Gandhi and had herself received mortal wounds, and still another that the Mahatma while wounded was not seriously so. These were the reports that spread through the assemblage as the fatally injured Gandhi was quickly borne to his quarters. There was a reluctance to believe that the worst had really occurred, yet there was a tenseness in the air as groups related to one another their respective accounts of the assassination and made their guesses as to the communal background of the assailant. It was more than a half hour before any statement reached those outside and then it was only the terse statement in English by one of the ashram as he emerged through the porch door—"Gandhiji is finished'. The simple prayer ceremony which was to have been conducted that afternoon with its recitations from the Bhagavada Gita, the Koran, and Christian hymns never took place." Herbert Reiner Jr. in Stratton (1950). • Quote 2: "Mr. Gandhi was picked up by attendants and carried rapidly back to the unpretentious bedroom where he had passed most of his working and sleeping hours. As he was taken through the door Hindu onlookers who could see him began to wail and beat their breasts. Less than half an hour later a member of Mr. Gandhi's entourage came out of the room and said to those about the door: "Bapu (father) is finished." But it was not until Mr. Gandhi's death was announced by All India Radio, at 6 P. M. that the words spread widely."Trumbull (1948)) The details and the role of Reiner in seizing Godse vary by the source. According to Frank Allston, Reiner stated that:

Godse stood nearly motionless with a small Beretta dangling in his right hand and to my knowledge made no attempt to escape or to take his own fire. ... Moving toward Godse I extended my right arm in an attempt to seize his gun but in doing so grasped his right shoulder in a manner that spun him into the hands of Royal Indian Air Force men, also spectators, who disarmed him. I then fastened a firm grasp on his neck and shoulders until other military and police took him into custody. (Note: "Reiner recalled, "People were standing as though paralyzed. I moved around them, grasped his shoulder and spun him around, then took a firmer grip on his shoulders")

According to Tunzelmann, Godse was seized and pummeled by Reiner. According to K. L. Gauba, Reiner was the "unsung hero" and had he not acted "Godse would probably have shot his way out". Reiner was standing in the front row, states Pramod Kapoor, and he seized and held Godse until the police arrived, but his name only appeared in some American newspapers. According to Bamzai and Damle, during the assassination trial, the government did not call to the stand American marine Herbert "Tom" Reiner who caught Godse or the nephew of then Congress minister Takthmal Jain of Madhya Bharat ministry (1948), as well as many others.

=== Other reports ===
According to some reports, Godse surrendered voluntarily and asked for the police. Yet other reports state he was rushed by the crowd, beaten, arrested, and taken to jail. According to some eyewitnesses and court proceedings, Nathuram Godse was seized immediately by witnesses and an Indian Air Force officer dispossessed him of the pistol. The crowd beat him to a bloodied state. The police wrested him loose from the angry crowd, took him to jail. A FIR was filed by Nandlal Mehta at the Tughlaq Road police station at Delhi.

The 31 January 1948 issue of the Manchester Guardian, a British newspaper, described Gandhi as walking from the "Birla House to the lawn where his evening prayer meetings were held". Gandhi was a bit late for the prayer, leaning on the shoulders of two grand-nieces. On his way, he was approached by a man [Godse] dressed in a khaki bush jacket and blue trousers. According to one version, stated the Guardian, Gandhi smiled back and spoke to Godse, then the assailant pulled out a pistol and fired three times, at point-blank range, into Gandhi's chest, stomach and groin. Gandhi died at 5:40pm, about half an hour after he was shot.

According to the Guardian report, which did not mention Herbert Reiner Jr, Godse "fired a fourth shot, apparently in an effort to kill himself, but a Royal Indian Air Force sergeant standing alongside jolted his arm and wrenched the pistol away. The sergeant wanted to shoot the man but was stopped by the police. An infuriated crowd fell upon the man and beat him with sticks, but he was apprehended by the police and taken to a police station." Godse was questioned by reporters, who in English replied that he was not sorry to have killed Gandhi and awaited his day in court to explain his reasons.

Vincent Sheean was another eyewitness and an American reporter who had covered World War II events. He went to India in 1947 and became a disciple of Gandhi. He was with the BBC reporter Bob Stimson in Birla House premises when Gandhi was assassinated. They stood next to each other by the corner of a wall. According to Sheean, Gandhi walked across the grass in their direction, leaning lightly "on two of the girls", and two or three others following them. Gandhi wrapped in a homespun shawl passed them by, states Sheean's eyewitness account, and climbed up four or five steps to the prayer ground. As usual, according to Sheean, "there was a clump of people, some of whom were standing and some of whom had gone on their knees or bent low before him. Bob and I turned to watch-we were perhaps ten feet away from the steps-but the clump of people cut off our view of the Mahatma now: he was so small".

Then, states Sheean, he heard "four, dull, dark explosions". Sheean asked Stimson, "what's that?" Stimson replied, "I don't know". It was a confusing place, people were weeping and many things happening, wrote Sheean. "A doctor was found, the police took charge; the body of the Mahatma was carried away; the crowd melted, perhaps urged to do so by the police; I saw none of this." Stimson filed a BBC report, then he and Sheean walked up and down the flower bed for a while. Sheean reported that he later met a "young American from the Embassy" who had never been to a prayer meeting before. Sheean did not take in anything the young American said about the scene, but a week later learned that "it was this young man who had captured the assassin, held him for the Indian police" and after turning the assassin over, it was this young American who searched the crowd for a doctor. He experienced a tribal pride, states Sheean, that even though he was paralyzed and helpless on the day of Gandhi's assassination, "one of his breed had been useful".

According to Ashis Nandy, before firing the shots Godse "bowed down to Gandhi to show his respect for the services the Mahatma had rendered the country; he made no attempt to run away and himself shouted for the police". According to Pramod Das, Godse after firing the shots raised his hand with the gun, surrendered and called for the police. According to George Fetherling, Godse did not try to flee, he "stood silently waiting to be arrested but was not approached at first because he was still armed; at last a member of the Indian air force grabbed him by the wrist, and Godse released his weapon". Police, states Fetherling, then "quickly surrounded Godse to prevent the crowd from lynching him". According to Matt Doeden and others, "Godse did not flee the scene, and he voluntarily surrendered himself to the police".

== Death ==
According to some accounts, Gandhi died on the spot. In other accounts, such as one prepared by an eyewitness journalist, Gandhi was carried back into the Birla House, into a bedroom, where he died about 30 minutes later as one of Gandhi's family members read verses from Hindu scriptures.

== Motives ==
During the subsequent trial, and in various witness accounts and books written since, the motivation of Godse has been summarized, speculated about and debated. Godse did not deny killing Gandhi, and made a long statement explaining his motivations for the assassination of Gandhi. Some of these motivations were:

- Godse felt that the massacre and suffering caused during, and due to, the Partition of India could have been avoided if Gandhi and the Government of India had acted to stop the killing of the minorities (Hindus and Sikhs) in West and East Pakistan. He stated Gandhi had not protested against these atrocities being suffered by Hindus in Pakistan and had instead resorted to fasts. In his court deposition, Godse said, "I thought to myself and foresaw I shall be totally ruined, and the only thing I could expect from the people would be nothing but hatred... if I were to kill Gandhiji. But at the same time I felt that the Indian politics in the absence of Gandhiji would surely be proved practical, able to retaliate, and would be powerful with armed forces. No doubt, my own future would be totally ruined, but the nation would be saved from the inroads of Pakistan."
- Godse claimed that Gandhi's fast to pressure the Indian government to release the final payment to Pakistan that it had previously frozen because of the war in Kashmir, and the Indian government's subsequent policy reversal, was proof that the Indian government reversed its decision to suit the feelings of Gandhi for appeasement of Pakistan. To Godse, India was not being run by the force of public opinion, but by Gandhi's whims. Godse added that he admired Gandhi for his lofty character, ceaseless work and asceticism, and Gandhi's formidable character meant that his influence outside of the due process would continue while he was alive. Gandhi had to be removed from the political stage, so that India can begin looking after its own interests as a nation, according to Godse.
- Godse stated he did not oppose Gandhian ahimsa teachings, but added that Gandhi's talk of religious tolerance and nonviolence had already caused India to cede Pakistan to Muslims, uprooted millions of people from their home, caused immense violent loss of life and broken families. He believed that if Gandhi was not checked he would bring destruction and more massacres to Hindus. In Godse's opinion, the only answer to violent aggression was violent self-defense. Godse stated that Gandhi had betrayed his Hindu religion and culture by supporting Muslims at the expense of Hindus because his lectures of ahimsa (non-violence) were directed at and accepted by the Hindu community only. Godse said, "I sat brooding intensely on the atrocities perpetrated on Hinduism and its dark and deadly future if left to face Islam (Pakistan) outside and Gandhi inside, and... I decided all of a sudden to take the extreme step against Gandhi. I did not hate Gandhi, I revered him because we both venerated much in Hindu religion, Hindu history and Hindu culture, we both were against superstitious aspects and the wrongs in Hinduism. Therefore, I bowed before Gandhi when I met him, then performed my moral duty and killed Gandhi."

== Trial and judgments ==
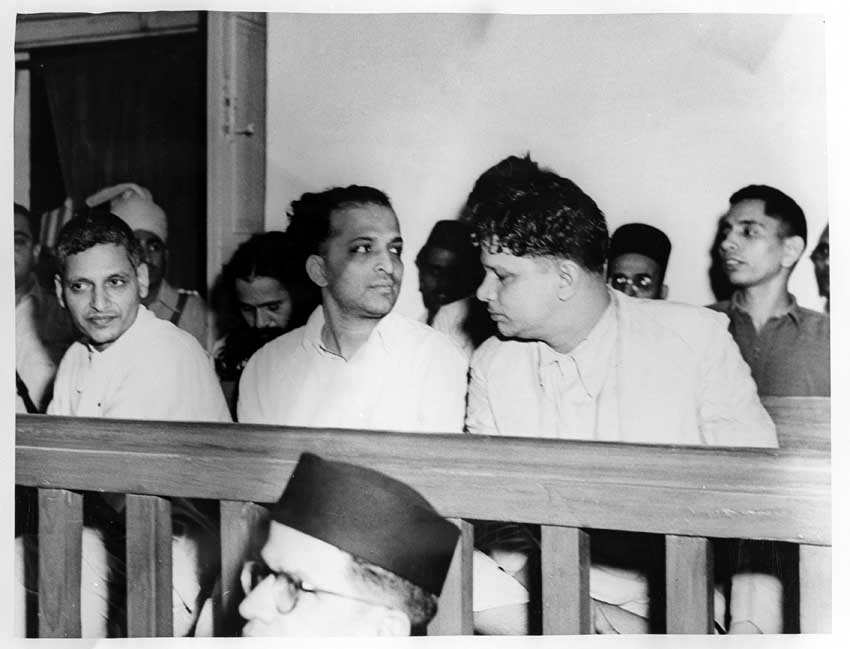
The trial of persons accused of participation and complicity in the assassination at the Special Court in Red Fort Delhi on 27 May 1948. Front row, left to right: Nathuram Godse, Narayan Apte, and Vishnu Ramkrishna Karkare. Seated behind, left to right: Digambar Badge, Shankar Kistaiya, Vinayak Damodar Savarkar, Gopal Godse, and Dattatraya Sadashiv Parachure.

The assassination was investigated, and many additional people were arrested, charged and tried in a lower court. The case and its appeal attracted considerable media attention, but Godse's statement in his defense to the court was banned immediately by the Indian government. Those convicted were either executed or served their complete sentences.

=== Investigation and arrests ===
Along with Nathuram Godse many other accomplices were arrested. They were all identified as prominent members of the Hindu Mahasabha – a nationalist organization.

Along with Godse and accomplices, police arrested the 65-year-old Vinayak Damodar Savarkar, who they accused of being the mastermind behind the plot.

== Arrested ==
The accused, their place of residence and occupational background were as follows:

1. Nathuram Vinayak Godse (Pune, Bombay State; a former member of Rashtriya Swayamsevak Sangh, editor, journalist)
2. Narayan Apte (Pune, Bombay State; formerly: British military service, teacher, newspaper manager)
3. Vinayak Damodar Savarkar (Mumbai, Bombay State; author, lawyer, politician and former president of Hindu Mahasabha)
4. Shankar Kistayya (Pune, Bombay State; rickshaw puller, domestic worker employed by Digambar Badge)
5. Dattatraya Parchure (Gwalior, Madhya Bharat; medical service, care giver)
6. Vishnu Karkare (Ahmednagar, Bombay State; orphan; odd jobs in hotels, musician in a traveling troupe, volunteer in relief efforts to religious riots (Noakhali), later restaurant owner)
7. Madanlal Pahwa (Ahmednagar refugee camp, Bombay State; former British Indian Army soldier, unemployed, Punjabi refugee who had migrated to India from Pakistan during the Partition.)
8. Gopal Godse (Pune, Bombay State; brother of Nathuram Godse; storekeeper, merchant)

Digambar Badge was alleged to be one of the conspirators and an active participant in the murder plan. After his arrest, he made a statement admitting his own guilt and incriminating his accomplices. He expressed his willingness to appear before a magistrate and repeat his statement; so, he was tendered a conditional pardon and turned King's evidence.

== Trial and sentencing: Lower Court ==
The trial began on 27 May 1948 and ran for eight months before Justice Atma Charan passed his final order on 10 February 1949. The prosecution called 149 witnesses, the defense none. The court found all of the defendants except one guilty as charged. Eight men were convicted for the murder conspiracy, and others convicted for violation of the Explosive Substances Act 1883. Vinayak Damodar Savarkar was acquitted and set free. Nathuram Godse and Narayan Apte were sentenced to death by hanging and the remaining six (including Godse's brother, Gopal) were sentenced to life imprisonment. Pahwa, Gopal Godse, and Karkare were all released from prison in October 1964.

== Appeal: High Court ==
Of those found guilty, all except Godse appealed their conviction and sentence. Godse accepted his death sentence, but appealed the lower court ruling that found him guilty of conspiracy. Godse argued, in his limited appeal to the High Court, that there was no conspiracy, he alone was solely responsible for the assassination, witnesses saw only him kill Gandhi, that all co-accused were innocent and should be released. According to Claude Markovits, Godse's declarations and expressed motivations during the appeal have been analyzed in contrasting ways. For example, "while Robert Payne, in his detailed account of the trial, dwells on the irrational nature of his statement, Ashis Nandy underlines the deeply rational character of Godse's action, which, in his view, reflected the well-founded fears among upper-caste Hindus of Gandhi's message and its impact on Hindu society."

The appeal by the convicted men was heard from 2 May 1949, at Peterhoff, Shimla (Himachal Pradesh) which then housed the Punjab High Court. The High Court confirmed the findings and sentences of the lower court except in the cases of Dattatraya Parchure and Shankar Kistayya who were acquitted of all charges.

Professor Claude Markovits, a Senior Research Fellow at the French National Centre for Scientific Research, wrote a 2004 book (The UnGandhian Gandhi: The Life and Afterlife of the Mahatma) that the trial and execution was rushed, attributing the haste to Vallabhbhai Patel's efforts "to avoid scrutiny for the failure to prevent the assassination."

== Executions ==
Godse and Apte were sentenced to death on 8 November 1949. Pleas for commutation were made by Gandhi's two sons, Manilal Gandhi and Ramdas Gandhi, but these pleas were turned down by Prime Minister of India Jawaharlal Nehru, deputy prime minister and home minister Vallabhbhai Patel and Governor-General of India C. Rajagopalachari. Godse and Apte were hanged in Ambala Jail on 15 November 1949. According to the Almanac of World Crime, at the hanging Apte's neck broke and he died instantly, but "Godse died slowly by the rope"; instead of having his neck snap he choked "to death for fifteen minutes".

== Coverage and judge's comments ==
The Government of India made the assassination trial public. According to Claude Markovits:

Godse ... tried to use the courtroom as a political forum by reading a long declaration in which he tried to justify his crime. He accused Gandhi of complacency towards Muslims, blamed him for the sufferings of Partition and generally criticized his subjectivism and pretension to a monopoly of the truth. Although his attacks were met with some echo in high-caste Hindu circles traditionally hostile to Gandhi, he could not create a groundswell of opinion in his favour.

Godse later appealed the death sentence verdict in the Appeals Court in Simla, then in Punjab. He made a plea of poverty and requested that he be allowed to appear and defend himself in person. As the request was allowed, Godse became the only accused to appear in person at the appeal. G.D. Khosla, one of the three judges who heard the appeal, later wrote of the Godse statement:

The audience was visibly and audibly moved. There was a deep silence when he ceased speaking. Many women were in tears and men were coughing and searching for their handkerchiefs. The silence was accentuated and made deeper by the sound of a[n] occasional subdued sniff or a muffled cough. It seemed to me that I was taking part in some kind of melodrama or a scene out of a Hollywood feature film. ... the audience most certainly thought Godse's performance was the only worth-while part of the lengthy proceedings ... I have no doubt that had the audience of that day been constituted into a jury and entrusted with the task of deciding Godse's appeal, they would have brought in a verdict of 'not guilty' by an overwhelming majority

== Tributes ==
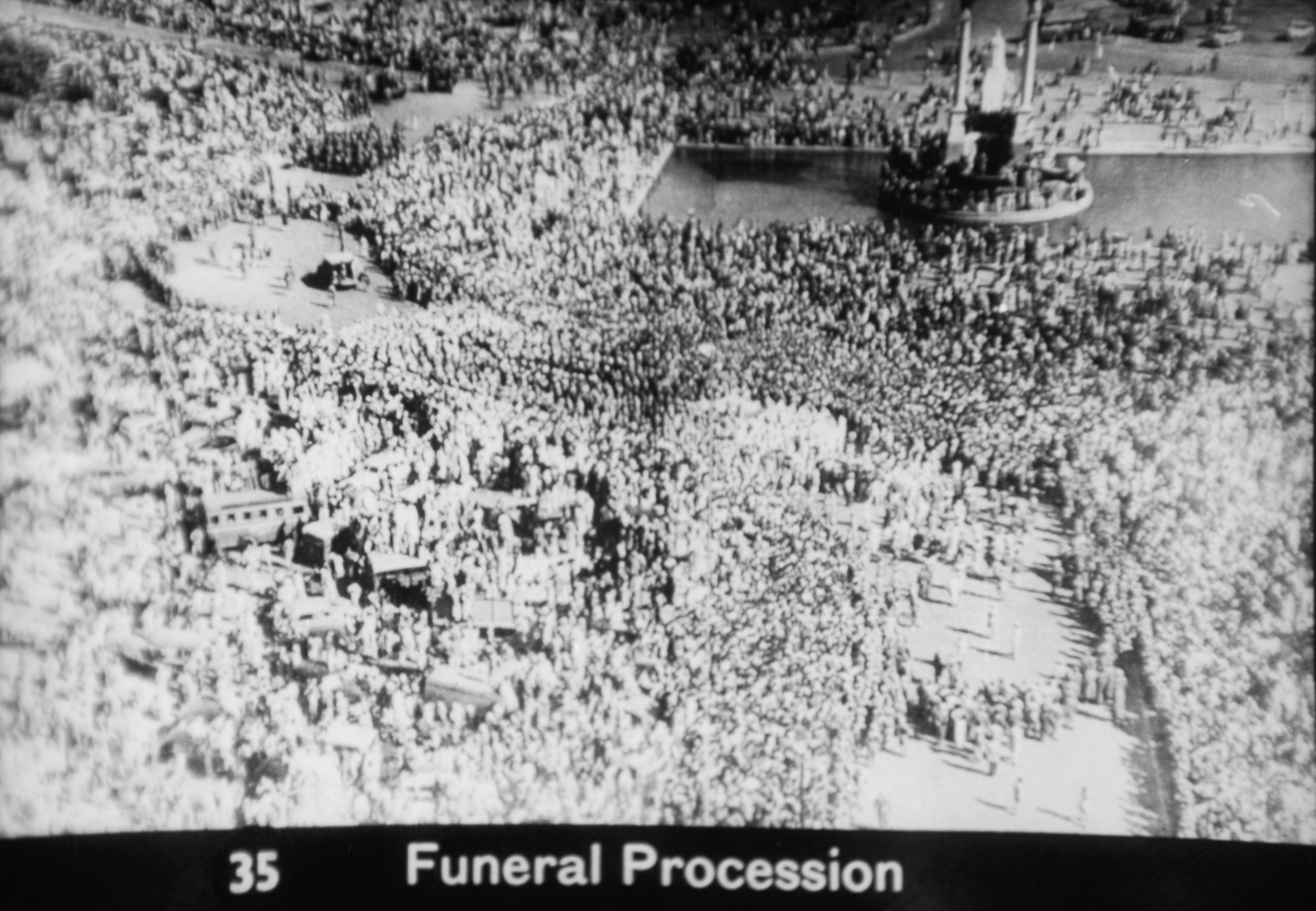
Funeral procession of Gandhi, passing the India Gate, Delhi

After the assassination, Prime Minister of India Jawaharlal Nehru addressed the nation by radio:

Friends and comrades, the light has gone out of our lives, and there is darkness everywhere, and I do not quite know what to tell you or how to say it. Our beloved leader, Bapu as we called him, the father of the nation, is no more. Perhaps I am wrong to say that; nevertheless, we will not see him again, as we have seen him for these many years, we will not run to him for advice or seek solace from him, and that is a terrible blow, not only for me, but for millions and millions in this country.

Muhammad Ali Jinnah, Governor-General of Pakistan and founder of Pakistan, on the day of Gandhi's assassination, said:

I am shocked to learn of the most dastardly attack on the life of Mr. Gandhi, resulting in his death. Whatever our political differences, he was one of the greatest men produced by the Hindu community, and a leader who commanded their universal confidence and respect. I wish to express my deep sorrow, and sincerely sympathize with the great Hindu community and his family in their bereavement at this momentous, historical and critical juncture so soon after the birth of freedom for Hindustan and Pakistan. The loss of dominion of India is irreparable, and it will be very difficult to fill the vacuum created by the passing way of such a great man at this moment.

Gandhi's death was mourned around the world. Field Marshal Jan Smuts, Prime Minister of South Africa, and once Gandhi's adversary, said:

Gandhi was one of the great men of my time and my acquaintance with him over a period of more than 30 years has only deepened my high respect for him however much we differed in our views and methods. A prince among men has passed away and we grieve with India in her irreparable loss.

The Prime Minister of the United Kingdom Clement Attlee said in a radio address to the nation on the night of January 30, 1948:

Everyone will have learnt with profound horror of the brutal murder of Mr Gandhi and I know that I am expressing the views of the British people in offering to his fellow-countrymen our deep sympathy in the loss of their greatest citizen. Mahatma Gandhi, as he was known in India, was one of the outstanding figures in the world today, ... For a quarter of a century this one man has been the major factor in every consideration of the Indian problem.

Leo Amery, the British secretary of state during the war said:

It can be said that no one contributed more to the particular way in which the charter of British rule in India has ended than Mahatma Gandhi himself. His death comes at the close of a great chapter in world history. In the mind of India, at least, he will always be identified with the opening of the new chapter which, however troubled at the outset, we should all hope, will develop in peace, concord and prosperity for India.

Lord Pethick-Lawrence, the British secretary of state in 1948 said:

What was the secret of his power over the hearts and minds of men and women? In my opinion it was the fact that he voluntarily stripped himself of every vestige of the privilege that he could have enjoyed on account of his birth, means, personality and intellectual pre-eminence and took on himself the status and infirmities of the ordinary man. When he was in South Africa as a young man and opposed the treatment of his fellow-countrymen in that land, he courted for himself the humiliation of the humblest Indian that he might in his own person face the punishment meted out for disobedience. When he called for non-cooperation with the British in India he himself disobeyed the law and insisted that he must be among the first to go to prison. ... He never claimed to be any other than an ordinary man. He acknowledged his liability to error and admitted that he had frequently-learnt by his mistakes. He was the universal brother, lover and friend of poor, weak, erring, suffering humanity.

Albert Einstein wrote:

He died as the victim of his own principles, the principle of non-violence. He died because in time of disorder and general irritation in his country, he refused armed protection for himself. It was his unshakable belief that the use of force is an evil in itself, that therefore it must be avoided by those who are striving for supreme justice to his belief. With his belief in his heart and mind, he has led a great nation on to its liberation. He has demonstrated that a powerful human following can be assembled not only through the cunning game of the usual political manoeuvres and trickery but through the cogent example of a morally superior conduct of life. The admiration for Mahatma Gandhi in all countries of the world rests on that recognition.

The New York Times in its editorial wrote:

It is Gandhi the saint who will be remembered, not only on the plains and in the hills of India, but all over the world. He strove for perfection as other men strive for power and possessions. He pitied those to whom wrong was done: the East Indian laborers in South Africa, the untouchable 'Children of God' of the lowest caste of India, but he schooled himself not to hate the wrongdoer. The power of his benignity grew stronger as his potential influence ebbed. He tried in the mood of the New Testament to love his enemies. Now he belongs to the ages.

Over two million people joined the five-mile-long funeral procession that took over five hours to reach Raj Ghat from Birla House, where he had been assassinated. Gandhi was cremated in a funeral pyre.

== Previous attempt in 1934 ==
A prior, unsuccessful attempt, to assassinate Gandhi occurred on 25 June 1934 at Pune. Gandhi was in Pune along with his wife, Kasturba Gandhi, to deliver a speech at Corporation Auditorium. They were travelling in a motorcade of two cars. The car in which the couple was travelling was delayed and the first car reached the auditorium. Just when the first car arrived at the auditorium, a bomb was thrown, which exploded near the car. This caused grievous injury to the Chief Officer of the Pune Municipal Corporation, two policemen and seven others. Nevertheless, no account or records of the investigation nor arrests made can be found. Gandhi's secretary, Pyarelal Nayyar, believed that the attempt failed due to lack of planning and co-ordination.

== Aftermath ==
In the newly formed Dominion of India, the carnage that had been set off by the Partition of India ended with the shock of Gandhi's assassination. The RSS, the Hindu paramilitary volunteer organisation, whose activities had been hidden from public view, and whose member Nathuram Godse had once been, was banned on 4 February 1948. The ban lasted one year. A few weeks before, Vallabhbhai Patel had invited the RSS and its more overtly political sister organization, the Hindu Mahasabha, to join the Congress and to build the new nation. He had warned the Hindu nationalists that they were not the only defenders of Hinduism, which was more tolerant than the variety whose ideals they upheld; he had also cautioned his colleagues in the Congress, that members of these Hindu nationalist organizations were not criminals but misguided patriots, who might prove hard to root out. Nehru argued against this viewpoint, emphasizing that the RSS had a history of easily succumbing to violent solutions, and needed to be punished and dissolved. With Gandhi's assassination, Patel's approach took the back seat.

Yasmin Khan argued that Gandhi's death and funeral helped consolidate the authority of the new Indian state under Nehru and Patel. The Congress tightly controlled the epic public displays of grief over a two-week period—the funeral, mortuary rituals and distribution of the martyr's ashes with millions participating in different events. Gandhi's death indirectly gave Nehru more power. According to historian Percival Spear, "The government was really a duumvirate between him (Nehru), who represented the idealism and left-wing tendencies of the party, and Vallabhbhai Patel, the realist and party boss from Gujarat who leaned to authoritarianism, orthodoxy, and big business." However, Gandhi's assassination had affected Patel as deeply as it did Nehru, and Patel busied himself on the integration of the princely states. After the violence of the Partition of India, the Hindu Right and its supporters within the Indian National Congress had asked if as a counterpoint to Pakistan's founding as a state for Muslims, India should not be publicly identified as a state for Hindus, but after Gandhi's assassination, the implication of the Hindu Right in it, and the revulsion felt by many for Hindu extremism as a result, secular values were reestablished in India.

According to Thomas Hansen:

Although Nathuram Godse's inspiration came from Savarkar rather than M. S. Golwalkar, the RSS was banned and 20,000 swayamsevaks were arrested during the next few months, while the Hindu Mahasabha remained legal but effectively stigmatized, especially in Maharashtra. The Chitpavan brahmins (Godse's community) were attacked in a collective retaliation against a community whose Hindu nationalist leanings were well known, and whose claims to past glory and historical dominance in the area were a contentious issue in Maharashtra.

== Terrorist act ==
The assassination of Mahatma Gandhi has been portrayed in retrospect as an act of Hindutva fanatical terror. In the 2011 book Godse's Children: Hindutva Terror in India, journalist Subhash Gatade called the assassination "the first terrorist act in independent India", and, as one scholar put it, "the harbinger of 'Hindutva terrorism' in India". In a 2012 review of Gatade's work, author Rohini Hensman concurred that if terrorism is defined as violence in pursuit of a political goal, then "the assassination of Gandhi could indeed be seen as a terrorist act".

== In media ==
Several books, plays and movies have been produced about the event:

- I, Nathuram Godse speaking is a play composed by Pradeep Dalvi based on the assassination trial. Locally produced as Me Nathuram Godse Boltoy, after seven sold-out shows it was banned in the State of Maharashtra in 1999 on directions from the then BJP-led coalition government in Delhi.
- Gandhi vs. Gandhi is a Marathi play that has been translated into several languages. Its primary plot is the relationship between Gandhi and his estranged son but it also deals briefly with the assassination.
- Nine Hours to Rama is a 1963 British movie based on Stanley Wolpert's novel of the same name, which is a fictional account of the final nine hours leading up to Gandhi's assassination.
- May It Please Your Honor was published in 1977, containing Nathuram Godse's statement to the court, after the Indian Congress party lost power for the first time since Indian independence, and the new government lifted the censorship imposed since 1948 after gaining power in national elections. The text was republished in 1993 as Why I Assassinated Mahatma Gandhi?.
- The 1982 film Gandhi is bookended by the assassination; Godse is portrayed by actor Harsh Nayyar.
- Hey Ram (2000) is a Tamil-Hindi bilingual film by Kamal Haasan about a fictitious plot to kill Gandhi by a man devastated by the partition riots and his change of heart even as the real-life plot succeeds.
- Gandhi and the Unspeakable: His Final Experiment with Truth (2012) by James Douglass is a non-fiction book that seeks to understand not only the facts of the murder but its importance in the larger struggle between non-violence and violence.
- Gandhi Godse – Ek Yudh (2023) is a fictional movie that reimagines the assassination with the survival of Gandhi.

== See also ==
- Kapur Commission
- Hindu terrorism

== Works cited ==
- Allo, Awol (2016), The Courtroom as a Space of Resistance: Reflections on the Legacy of the Rivonia Trial, Routledge, pp. 357–, ISBN 978-1-317-03711-8
- Allston, Frank J. (1995), Ready for Sea: The Bicentennial History of the U.S. Navy Supply Corps, Naval Institute Press, ISBN 978-1-55750-033-5
- Arnold, David (2014), Gandhi, Routledge, pp. 225–, ISBN 978-1-317-88235-0
- Bamzai, Kaveree; Damle, Shridhar (2016), Why Savarkar makes BJP and Sangh Parivar nervous, dailyO, archived from the original on 13 June 2022
- Bandyopadhyay, Sekhar (2009), Decolonization in South Asia: Meanings of Freedom in Post-independence West Bengal, 1947–52, Routledge, p. 146, ISBN 978-1-134-01824-6, archived from the original on 24 August 2024
- Bapu, Prabhu (2012), Hindu Mahasabha in Colonial North India, 1915-1930: Constructing Nation and History, Routledge, pp. 118–, ISBN 978-1-136-25500-7
- Cush, Denise; Robinson, Catherine; York, Michael (2008), Encyclopedia of Hinduism, Taylor & Francis, p. 544, ISBN 978-0-7007-1267-0, archived from the original on 29 March 2024
- Doeden, Matt (2013), Darkness Everywhere: The Assassination of Mohandas Gandhi, Minneapolis: Twenty-First Century Books, ISBN 978-1-4677-1659-8
- Gauba, Khalid Latif (1969), The Assassination of Mahatma Gandhi, Jaico Publishing House, p. 150, ISBN 9780882531403
- Gandhi, Manuben (1962), Last Glimpses of Bapu, Ahmedabad: Nuvajivan, Delhi: Agarwala, OCLC 255372054 (Foreword by: Sarvepalli Radhakrishnan)
- Gandhi, Rajmohan (2006), Gandhi: The Man, His People, and the Empire, University of California Press, p. 660, ISBN 978-0-520-25570-8
- Godse, N.V. (1948), Why I assassinated Mahatma Gandhi?, Surya Bharti Parkashan (Reprint: 1993), OCLC 33991989
- Goldstein, Natalie (2010), Religion and the State, Infobase Publishing, pp. 128–, ISBN 978-1-4381-3124-5
- Hansen, Thomas Blom (1999), The Saffron Wave: Democracy and Hindu Nationalism in Modern India, Princeton University Press, pp. 249–, ISBN 1-4008-2305-6
- Hardiman, David (2003), Gandhi in His Time and Ours: The Global Legacy of His Ideas, Columbia University Press, pp. 174–76, ISBN 9780231131148, archived from the original on 29 March 2024
- Haynes, Jeffrey (2016), Routledge Handbook of Religion and Politics, Routledge, pp. 73–, ISBN 978-1-317-28747-6
- Kapoor, Pramod (2014), The Dying of the Light, Outlook, archived from the original on 27 September 2023
- Khosla, G.D. (1965). The Murder of the Mahatma (proceedings by the Chief Justice of Punjab) (PDF). Jaico Publishers. Archived from the original (PDF) on 21 September 2015.
- Lelyveld, Joseph (2012), Great Soul: Mahatma Gandhi and His Struggle with India, Vintage Books, ISBN 978-0-307-38995-4
- McLain, Karline (2007). "Who Shot the Mahatma? Representing Gandhian Politics in Indian Comic Books". South Asia Research. 27 (1). SAGE Publications: 57–77. doi:10.1177/026272800602700104. S2CID 145658881.
- Mallot, J. Edward (2012), Memory, Nationalism, and Narrative in Contemporary South Asia, Palgrave Macmillan, pp. 75–, ISBN 978-1-137-00705-6
- Markovits, Claude (2004), The UnGandhian Gandhi: The Life and Afterlife of the Mahatma, Anthem Press, ISBN 978-1-84331-127-0
- Nash, Jay Robert (1981), Almanac of World Crime, New York: Rowman & Littlefield, p. 69, ISBN 978-1-4617-4768-0
- "Herbert Reiner Jr., Diplomat, 83; Captured Gandhi's killer in 1948", The Boston Globe, 21 May 2000
- Paranjape, Makarand R. (2015). The Death and Afterlife of Mahatma Gandhi. Random House. ISBN 978-81-8400-683-4.
- Pronko, N. H.; Bowles, J. W. (2013), Empirical Foundations Of Psychology, Taylor & Francis, p. 343, ISBN 978-1-136-32708-7
- Rajghatai, Chidanand (2013), US Diplomat Apprehended Gandhi's Assassin, Times of India, archived from the original on 22 September 2022
- Sheean, Vincent (2011) [1949]. Lead, Kindly Light: Gandhi and the Way to Peace. [Charleston, SC]: Nabu Press. ISBN 978-1-178-83542-7. OCLC 946610148.
- Singer, Kurt D. (1953), The Men in the Trojan Horse, Beacon Press
- Spear, Percival (1990) [1978], History of India, Volume 2: From the sixteenth century to the twentieth century, Penguin, ISBN 978-0-140-13836-8, archived from the original on 3 July 2023
- Stimson, Robert (30 January 1948), "India: The Assassination of Mahatma Gandhi (audio starts at 3:06, ends at 5:36)", Canadian Broadcasting Corporation News Roundup, archived from the original on 9 March 2022
- Stratton, Roy Olin (1950), SACO, the Rice Paddy Navy, C. S. Palmer Publishing Company
- Talbot, Ian; Singh, Gurharpal (2009), The Partition of India, Cambridge University Press, ISBN 978-0-521-85661-4, archived from the original on 29 March 2024
- Trumbull, Robert (31 January 1948), "Gandhi is killed by a Hindu; India shaken; World mourns; 15 die in rioting in Bombay", The New York Times, archived from the original on 7 February 2017
- Tunzelmann, Alex von (2012), Indian Summer: The Secret History of the End of an Empire, Simon and Schuster, p. 320, ISBN 978-1-4711-1476-2
