= Narayan Apte =

Assassin of Mahatma Gandhi

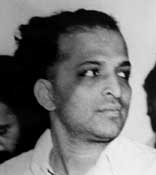
- Apte in 1948
- Born: 1911
- Died: 15 November 1949 (aged 38); Ambala Prison, East Punjab, India (now in Haryana, India)
- Cause of death: Execution by hanging
- Known for: Assassination of Mahatma Gandhi

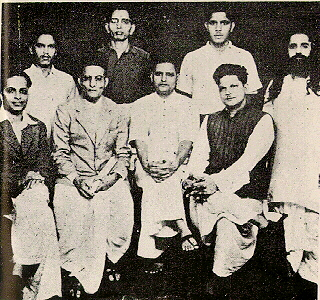
A group photo of people accused in the Mahatma Gandhi murder case. Standing: Shankar Kistaiya, Gopal Godse, Madanlal Pahwa, Digambar Badge (Approver). Sitting: Narayan Apte, Vinayak D. Savarkar, Nathuram Godse, Vishnu Karkare

Narayan Dattatraya Apte (1911 – 15 November 1949) was an Indian assassin and recruiting officer for the Royal Indian Air Force. He was executed by hanging for planning the assassination of Mahatma Gandhi.

== Family ==
Apte was born in a Chitpavan Brahmin family. His father Dattatreya Apte was a Sanskrit scholar and a historian. Narayan had 3 sisters and 4 brothers. As was the norm, his marriage was arranged; to Champa Phadtare, the daughter of an influential family from Pune. The marriage was said to have been a "perfect match" for both spouses. Champa later had a son with him.

== Life ==
Like the rest of his family, he developed a passion to learn and become a scholar. He graduated from Bombay University in 1932 with a Bachelor’s degree in Science. After three years of unemployment he was taken in as a tutor in Mission High School in Ahmednagar. He aspired to become a master in the field of education. Soon enough, he took the "Bachelor of Education" degree exam and passed. He started a shooting club in Ahmednagar which eventually gained a lot of publicity and was duplicated in places like Pune.

In 1939, he joined the Hindu Mahasabha. With the outbreak of the Second World War, the then president of the Hindu Mahasabha, Vinayak Damodar Savarkar ordered the party members to help the British in any way possible. Apte shot up the ranks to be a recruiter in the Poona region and a Flight Lieutenant of the Royal Indian Air Force.

With the recruitment scene in Poona being very poor, Narayan had a lot of time on his hands. He eventually started working closely with Nathuram Godse in the Hindu Mahasabha. At this juncture, Savarkar launched the Hindu Rashtra Dal which was intended to be a radical wing of the Mahasabha. Its aims included disrupting Congress meetings.

In 1944, Godse broached the topic of starting a newspaper called "Agranee" encompassing the ideals of the Dal and the Mahasabha. Apte became the manager of this paper and wore his uniform of a recruiter in World War 2. The newspaper seemed to be failing miserably, however, Savarkar managed to keep it alive by constantly sending generous donations. The content was highly rabid and infringed the Bombay Press Act. Just before the government issued orders to close it down, they renamed the paper to the "Hindu Rashtra". The last issue of "Hindu Rashtra" was published on 31 January 1948.

On 14 January 1948, he along with Godse took a train from Pune to Mumbai. After three days, they would fly to Delhi to assassinate Mahatma Gandhi.

On 20 January, Apte, Badge, and Kistayya drove to Birla House for planning the murder of Gandhi. Godse was suffering from severe headaches thus he stayed back.

By 27 January, Apte was no longer the leader of the murder plan. It was decided that Godse would be the one to kill Gandhi.

On 30 January, Apte stood at Godse's side until shots were fired at Gandhi by Godse.

Apte eluded arrest for two weeks before he was arrested in Mumbai.

== Execution ==
Apte was tried and found guilty of Gandhi's murder in 1949. Apte along with Godse was hanged on 15 November 1949.

== See also ==
- Assassination of Mahatma Gandhi
