= Studio Movie Grill =

American dine-in movie theater chain

Studio Movie Grill Holdings, LLC
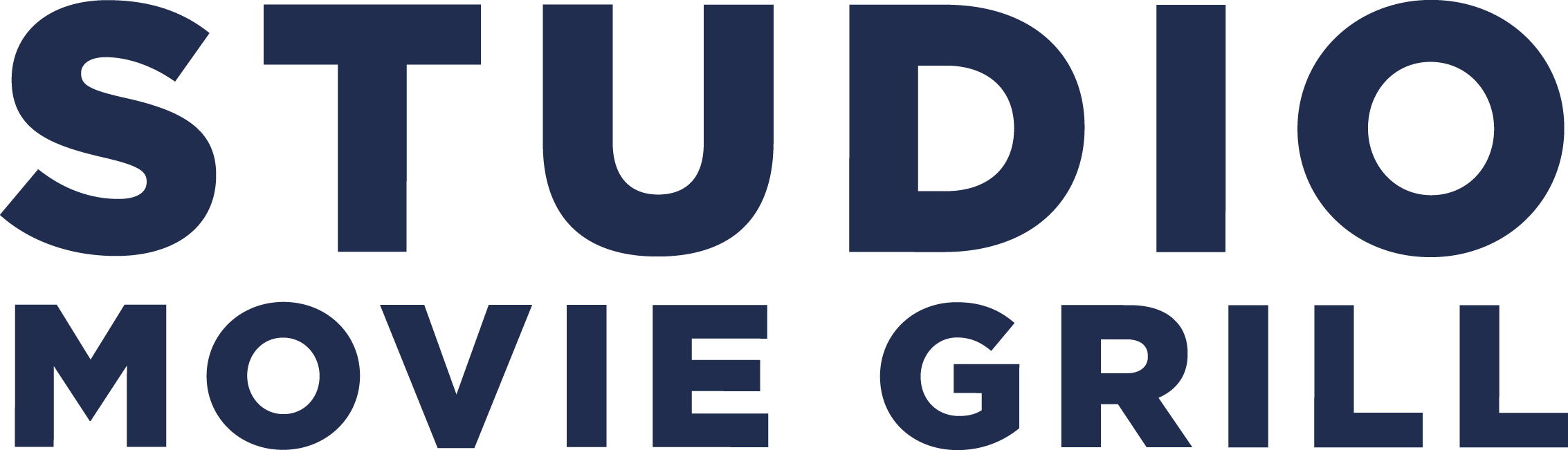
- Trade name: Studio Movie Grill
- Company type: Private
- Industry: Entertainment
- Founded: 1993; 33 years ago in Addison, Texas, U.S.
- Founders: Brian Schultz
- Headquarters: Dallas, Texas, U.S.
- Number of locations: 18 (2023)
- Key people: Ted Croft (CEO)
- Website: www.studiomoviegrill.com

Studio Movie Grill is an American dine-in movie theater chain based in Dallas, Texas. The company's theaters feature a bar and lounge area, with meals that are served in the lounge area or at the theater seat before and during the movie.

== History ==
Studio Movie Grill was founded in 1993 by Brian Schultz, who served as its CEO for twenty-seven years until April 2021.

The company originated with the opening of the Granada Prestonwood in Addison, Texas, which featured five screens with private luxury boxes and valet parking. The concept evolved into the Studio Movie Grill chain. By 2019, Studio Movie Grill had 33 locations in 10 states with of over 300 screens.

In October 2020, Studio Movie Grill filed for chapter 11 bankruptcy protection. The company's cash reserves were low due to losses caused by the COVID-19 pandemic. In April 2021, the company announced that they had emerged from bankruptcy. Longtime CFO and COO Ted Croft also became the chain's new CEO after navigating Studio Movie Grill through the pandemic, in which many of its locations stayed open for food delivery orders, and securing funding in a new equity deal. Today, Studio Movie Grill has only 18 locations situated in five states: California, Florida, Georgia, Illinois, and Texas.

== Corporate affairs ==
The headquarters is in 20,200 square feet (1,880 m^{2}) of office space in the Hidden Grove office building in North Dallas. The headquarters were previously in a 16,600-square-foot (1,540 m^{2}) area in another building, but moved in 2016.

As of 2024, Studio Movie Grill has 18 locations in 5 states with over 150 screens.
