= Gopal Godse =

Assassin of Mahatma Gandhi (died 2005)

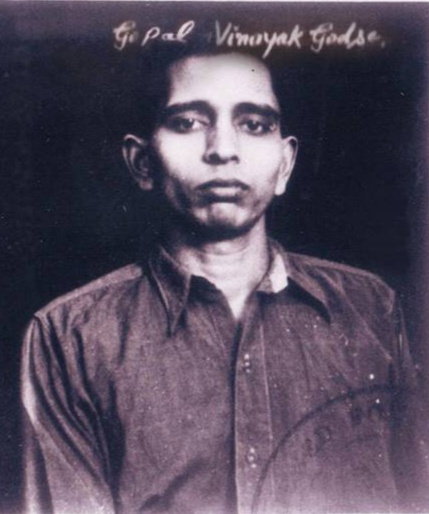
- Born: Gopal Vinayak Godse; 12 June 1919; British India
- Died: 26 November 2005 (aged 86); Pune, Maharashtra, India
- Known for: Co-conspirator in the assassination of Mahatma Gandhi
- Spouse: Sindhu Godse
- Children: 3
- Relatives: Nathuram Godse (brother)

Gopal Vinayak Godse (12 June 1919 – 26 November 2005) was an Indian Hindutva activist convicted of co-conspiring to assassinate Mahatma Gandhi in 1948.

== Biography ==
A 2021 book about Gandhi's assassination stated that Gopal Godse worked at the time at a transportation company, and had previously served in the British Army during the Anglo-Iraqi War. Godse's brother Nathuram Godse fatally shot Gandhi on 30 January 1948. Gopal Godse was among those arrested soon after for conspiring to commit the assassination. The Godse's and their co-conspirators had previously attempted to kill Gandhi ten days earlier, an abortive attempt for which conspirator Madanlal Pahwa was arrested and imprisoned. Godse was convicted, and served 16 years in prison. In November 1949, His brother Nathuram and Narayan Apte were sentenced to death and hanged for their role in the assassination.

Godse was released in 1964. He did not repent of his role in the assassination, saying in a 2003 interview that he did not regret it. Godse lived in Pune after his release, subsisting on royalties from books he wrote about the assassination. In 1993, he released Why I Assassinated Mahatma Gandhi, a book written by his brother Nathuram. In an interview shortly afterward, he stated that Nathuram, himself, and their two brothers had all been long-time members of the Rashtriya Swayamsevak Sangh (RSS), and had never left the organisation. The RSS had previously distanced itself from Gandhi's assassins. According to political commentator A. G. Noorani, two of his books, including one about the assassination, were promoted by the Organiser, the magazine of the RSS, in 1997. He died in his home on 26 November 2005, as the last surviving member of the conspiracy. He was married to Sindhu Godse, and had two daughters and a son.

The Marathi language play Me Nathuram Godse Boltoy (This is Nathuram Godse Speaking), written by Pradeep Dalvi and first performed in 1997, was based on Gopal Godse's book May It Please You Honour. According to Karline McLain the play "enacts Godse's defense plea" and thus "explores the assassination of Gandhi and the trial of Godse from Godse's point of view.
