= Soviet Union and state-sponsored terrorism =

The Soviet Union and some communist states have sponsored international terrorism on numerous occasions, especially during the Cold War. NATO and the Italian, German and British governments saw violence in the form of "communist fighting organizations" as a serious threat.

== State terrorism ==
While he denounced the terrorism which was employed by the Socialist Revolutionaries, Vladimir Lenin advocated the use of state terrorism since the earliest days of his political activities. At the third congress of the RSDLP in 1905, while he was discussing the revolution in Russia, he argued that mass terror needed to be used in order to prevent anti-revolutionary mutinies. Lenin had been influenced by the writings of radical revolutionary Sergey Nechayev and his manifesto which called for Jacobin-style terror, saying that every communist revolutionary should read him. Felix Dzerzhinsky, the founder and first director of the Cheka secret police is quoted as saying "We stand for organized terror – this should be frankly admitted. Terror is an absolute necessity during times of revolution. Our aim is to fight against the enemies of the Soviet Government and of the new order of life. We judge quickly. In most cases only a day passes between the apprehension of the criminal and his sentence. When confronted with evidence criminals in almost every case confess; and what argument can have greater weight than a criminal's own confession?"

== Support of terrorist organizations ==
According to Soviet defector Grigori Besedovsky, the NKVD was directly coordinating a number of bombings in Poland as early as in the 1920s. The largest bombing, against Warsaw Citadel on 13 October 1923, destroyed a large military ammunition storage facility, killing 28 and wounding 89 Polish soldiers. Another bombing on 23 May 1923 at Warsaw University killed a number of people, including professor Roman Orzęcki. Further bombings happened in Częstochowa, Kraków and Białystok.

Soviet secret services have been described by GRU defectors Viktor Suvorov and Stanislav Lunev as "the primary instructors of terrorists worldwide." The terrorism was seen by Soviet leadership as the only way to reduce the imbalance between USSR military and economical power against the Western world. According to Ion Mihai Pacepa, KGB General Aleksandr Sakharovsky once said: "In today's world, when nuclear arms have made military force obsolete, terrorism should become our main weapon." He also claimed that "airplane hijacking is my own invention" and that in 1969 alone, 82 planes were hijacked worldwide by the KGB-financed Palestine Liberation Organization (PLO).

After defeat of Soviet-supported Arab states in the 1967 Six-Day war, Soviet Union started a widespread undercover campaign against Israel, involving propaganda as well as direct military support (funding, arms, training) to terrorist groups declaring Israel as their enemy. Additionally, the USSR took the decision to increase anti-Israeli sentiment by disseminating anti-Zionist propaganda and even referencing previous anti-Semitic tropes from Western culture, such as the Jewish-Freemason conspiracy theories. The overall goal of the campaign was to spread the idea that the state of Israel was an oppressive, imperialist state which was built on unjust terms, a feeling expressed in the Soviet-crafted UN General Assembly Resolution 3379. Meanwhile, the cause of the Palestinian people who had suffered mass displacement and deportation with the establishment of the state of Israel and the subsequent wars in the region was promoted and the USSR gave active support to certain Palestinian rebel groups whose primary method of struggle is characterised as terrorism, such as the PLO.

The leader of the PLO, Yasser Arafat, established close collaboration with the Romanian Securitate service and the Soviet KGB in the beginning of the 1970s. The secret training of PLO guerrillas was provided by the KGB. However, the main KGB activities and arms shipments were channeled through Wadie Haddad of the Democratic Front for the Liberation of Palestine (DFLP), who usually stayed in a KGB dacha (BARVIKHA-1) during his visits to the Soviet Union. Led by Carlos the Jackal, a group of PFLP fighters accomplished a spectacular raid on the Organization of Petroleum Exporting Countries office in Vienna in 1975. Advance notice of this operation "was almost certainly" given to the KGB. Faisal al-Shammeri credits Soviet special services with sponsoring international terrorist organizations that emerged in Libya in th 1970-'80s, Palestine Liberation Organization, Popular Front for the Liberation of Palestine, as well as continuation of these policies after the fall of the USSR.

The Red Army Faction in Germany was supported by the Stasi, East Germany's security service. In 1978 part of the RAF group (Brigitte Mohnhaupt, Peter Boock, Rolf Wagner, Sieglinde Hoffmann) was hiding in a Służba Bezpieczeństwa (SB) safe house in the Mazury district in Poland, where they escaped through Yugoslavia. During the stay, they were training together with Arab operatives and also hiding from German police during an intensive search for the group's members in West Germany. Carlos the Jackal and other prominent terrorists, such as Abu Nidal, Abu Daoud and Abu Abbas, enjoyed protection at SB safe houses in Poland, especially in the 1980s. Communist Poland was also used as a transit country for money and weapon transfers for these organisations.

A number of notable operations have been conducted by the KGB to support international terrorists with weapons on the orders from the Soviet Communist Party, including:

- Transfer of machine-guns, automatic rifles, Walther pistols, and cartridges to the Official Irish Republican Army by the Soviet intelligence vessel Reduktor (operation SPLASH) in 1972 to fulfill a personal request for arms from Michael O'Riordan.
- Transfer of anti-tank grenade RPG-7 launchers, radio-controlled SNOP mines, pistols with silencers, machine guns, and other weaponry to the Popular Front for the Liberation of Palestine through Wadi Haddad, who was recruited as a KGB agent in 1970 (operation VOSTOK, "East").

== Cold War and terrorism ==
Large-scale sabotage operations may have been prepared by the KGB and GRU in case of war against the United States, Canada, United Kingdom and the rest of Europe, as alleged by intelligence historian Christopher Andrew in Mitrokhin Archive and in books by former GRU and SVR officers Victor Suvorov and Stanislav Lunev, and Kouzminov. Among the planned operations were the following:

- Large arms caches were hidden in many countries for the planned terrorist acts. They were booby-trapped with "Lightning" explosive devices. One of such cache, which was identified by Mitrokhin, exploded when Swiss authorities tried to remove it from woods near Bern. Several others caches (probably not equipped with the "Lightnings") were removed successfully.
- Preparations for nuclear sabotage. Some of the hidden caches could contain portable tactical nuclear weapons known as RA-115 "suitcase bombs" prepared to assassinate US leaders in the event of war, according to GRU defector Stanislav Lunev. Lunev states that he had personally looked for hiding places for weapons caches in the Shenandoah Valley area and that "it is surprisingly easy to smuggle nuclear weapons into the US", either across the Mexican border or using a small transport missile that can slip in undetected when launched from a Russian airplane.
- Extensive sabotage plans in London, Washington, Paris, Bonn, Rome, and other Western capitals were revealed by KGB defector Oleg Lyalin in 1971, including a plan to flood the London underground and deliver poison capsules to Whitehall. This disclosure triggered the mass expulsion of Russian spies from London.
- FSLN leader Carlos Fonseca Amador was described as "a trusted agent" in KGB files. "Sandinista guerrillas formed the basis for a KGB sabotage and intelligence group established in 1966 on the Mexican US border".
- Disruption of the power supply in all of New York State by KGB sabotage teams, which would be based along the Delaware River, in the Big Spring Park.
- An "immensely detailed" plan to destroy "oil refineries and oil and gas pipelines across Canada from British Columbia to Montreal" (operation "Cedar") had been prepared, which took twelve years to complete.
- A plan for sabotage of Hungry Horse Dam in Montana.
- A detailed plan to destroy the port of New York (target GRANIT); the most vulnerable points of the port were marked on maps.

According to Lunev, a probable scenario in the event of war would be poisoning of the Potomac River with chemical or biological weapons, "targeting the residents of Washington, D.C." He also noted that it is "likely" that GRU operatives have placed already "poison supplies near the tributaries to major US reservoirs." This information was confirmed by Alexander Kouzminov, who was responsible for transporting dangerous pathogens from around the world for the Soviet program of biological weapons in the 1980s and the beginning of the 1990s. He described a variety of biological terrorist acts that would be carried out on the order of the Russian President in the event of hostilities, including poisoning public drinking-water supplies and food processing plants. At the end of the 1980s, the Soviet Union "was the only country in the world that could start and win a global biological war, something we had already established that the West was not ready for", according to Kouzminov.

== See also ==
- Active measures
- Left-wing terrorism
- Communist terrorism
- Iran and state-sponsored terrorism
- Israel and state-sponsored terrorism
- Pakistan and state-sponsored terrorism
- Poison laboratory of the Soviet secret services
- India and state-sponsored terrorism
  - Hindu terrorism
    - Hindutva
    - Violence against Christians in India
    - Violence against Muslims in independent India
- Qatar and state-sponsored terrorism
- Saudi Arabia–United States relations#Allegations of funding terrorism
- State-sponsored terrorism#Soviet Union
- Terrorism in Russia
- United States and state-sponsored terrorism
