= Pakistan and state-sponsored terrorism =

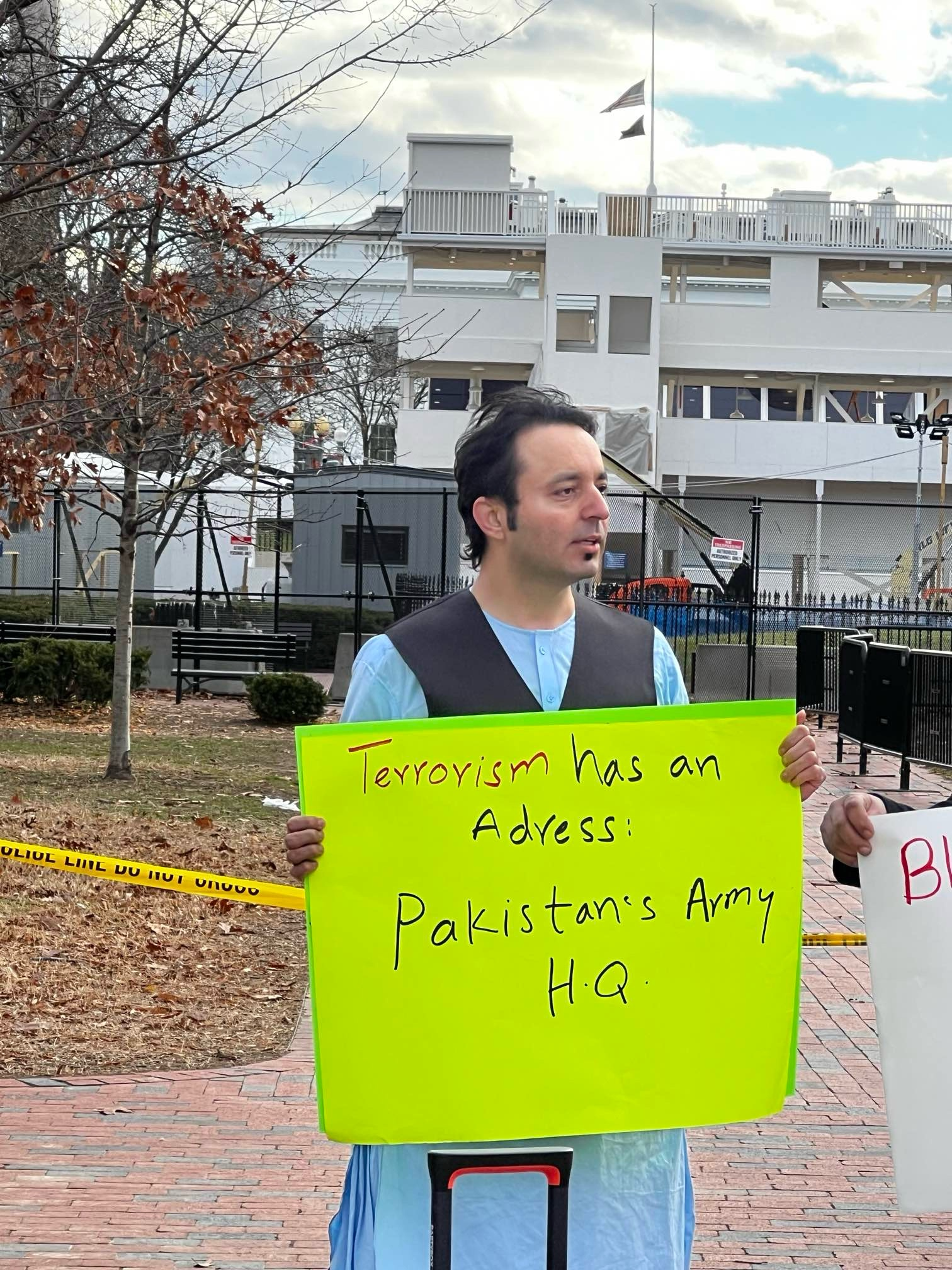
Afghans protesting against Pakistan's terrorism in front of the White House

Pakistan and state-sponsored terrorism refers to the involvement of Pakistan in terrorism through the backing of various designated terrorist organisations. Pakistan has been frequently accused by various countries, including its neighbours Afghanistan, Iran, and India, as well as by the United States, the United Kingdom, Germany, and France, of involvement in a variety of terrorist activities in both its local region of South Asia and beyond. Pakistan's northwestern tribal regions along the Afghanistan–Pakistan border have been described as an effective safe haven for terrorists by Western media and the United States Secretary of Defense, while India has accused Pakistan of perpetuating the insurgency in Jammu and Kashmir by providing financial support and armaments to militant groups, as well as by sending state-trained terrorists across the Line of Control and de facto India–Pakistan border to launch attacks in Indian-administered Kashmir and India proper, respectively.

According to an analysis published by the Saban Center for Middle East Policy at the Brookings Institution in 2008, Pakistan was reportedly, with the possible exception of Iran, perhaps the world's most active sponsor of terrorist groups, aiding groups that pose a direct threat to the United States. Pakistan's active participation has caused thousands of deaths in the region; all these years Pakistan has been supportive to several terrorist groups despite several stern warnings from the international community. Daniel Byman, a professor and senior analyst of terrorism and security at the Center For Middle East Policy, also wrote that Pakistan is probably 2008's most active sponsor of terrorism. In 2018, the former Prime Minister of Pakistan, Nawaz Sharif, suggested that the Pakistani government (see The Establishment) played a role in the 2008 Mumbai attacks that were carried out by Lashkar-e-Taiba, a Pakistan-based Islamist terrorist group. In July 2019, Pakistani Prime Minister Imran Khan, on an official visit to the United States, acknowledged the presence of some 30,000–40,000 armed terrorists operating on Pakistani soil. He further stated that previous administrations were hiding this truth, particularly from the United States, for the last 15 years during the war on terror.

The United States' State Sponsors of Terrorism designation list describes Pakistan as a terrorist safe haven where individual terrorists and terrorist groups are able to organise, plan, raise funds, communicate, recruit, train, transit, and operate in relative security because of inadequate/supportive governance, political will, or both. Osama bin Laden, the leader of al-Qaeda and mastermind behind the September 11 attacks on the United States in 2001, was killed by U.S. Navy SEALs during Operation Neptune Spear at his compound near the Pakistan Military Academy in Abbottabad, Khyber Pakhtunkhwa, Pakistan.

A terror attack claimed by the Resistance Front (who later retracted the claim) killed at least 26 civilians in Pahalgam, Jammu and Kashmir on 22 April 2025. India accused Pakistan of involvement, while Pakistan denied any such backing.

In 2025, Khwaja Muhammad Asif, Pakistan's Defence Minister, admitted in an interview with a Sky News journalist Yalda Hakim that his country had supported terrorist groups for more than three decades, saying that Pakistan has been doing the "dirty work" of the western nations when asked about supporting and financing terrorism.

== Background ==
Until Pakistan became a key ally in the war on terrorism, the US Secretary of State included Pakistan on the 1993 list of countries which repeatedly provide support for acts of international terrorism. In fact, many consider that Pakistan has been playing both sides in the fight against terror, on the one hand, demonstrating to help curtail terrorist activities while on the other, stoking it. Pakistani journalist Ahmed Rashid and author Ted Galen Carpenter had accused Pakistan's Inter-Services Intelligence (ISI) of providing help to the Taliban and separatists in Kashmir.

== Allegations of state-sponsored terrorism ==
Author Gordon Thomas states that whilst aiding in the capture of Al Qaeda members, Pakistan still sponsored terrorist groups in the Indian union territory of Jammu and Kashmir, funding, training and arming them in their war of attrition against India. Journalist Stephen Schwartz notes that several terrorist and criminal groups are backed by senior officers in the Pakistani army, the country's ISI intelligence establishment and other armed bodies of the state. According to Ted Galen Carpenter, a senior fellow for defence and foreign policy studies at the Cato Institute, without the active support of the government in Islamabad, it is doubtful whether the Taliban could ever have come to power in Afghanistan. Pakistani authorities helped fund the militia and equip it with military hardware during the mid-1990s when the Taliban was merely one of several competing factions in Afghanistan’s civil war. Only when the United States exerted enormous diplomatic pressure after the 11 September attacks did Islamabad begin to sever its political and financial ties with the Taliban. Even now it is not certain that key members of Pakistan’s intelligence service have repudiated their Taliban clients.

Afghanistan is not the only place where Pakistani leaders have flirted with terrorist clients. Pakistan has also assisted rebel & jihadist forces in Kashmir, having committed terrorist acts against civilians. A disproportionate number of the extremist madrassa schools funded by the Saudis operate in Pakistan. Pakistan's former ambassador to the U.S., Husain Haqqani has said Pakistan sponsors terrorism.

Author Daniel Byman states, "Pakistan is probably today's most active sponsor of terrorism." Writing in an article published by The Australian he stated, "Following the terror massacres in Mumbai, Pakistan may now be the single biggest state sponsor of terrorism, beyond even Iran, yet it has never been listed by the US State Department as a state sponsor of terrorism".

Former Pakistani president Pervez Musharraf has conceded that his forces trained militant groups to fight India in Indian-administered Kashmir. He confessed that the government turned a blind eye because it wanted to force India to enter into negotiations, as well as raise the issue internationally. He also said Pakistani spies in the Inter-Services Intelligence directorate (ISI) cultivated the Taliban after 2001 because Karzai's government was dominated by non-Pashtuns, who are the country's largest ethnic group, and by officials who were thought to favour India.

Pakistan has been included in the FATF greylist many times for its financial support to terrorist activities, and the last removal from it was in 2023. However, the Financial Action Task Force has warned Pakistan among other countries in 2025 and stated that it may still be subject to scrutiny over money laundering and terror financing since its removal from the greylist.

=== Inter-Services Intelligence and terrorism ===
The ISI, has often been accused of playing a role in major terrorist attacks across India including terrorism in Kashmir, the July 2006 Mumbai Train Bombings, the 2001 Indian Parliament attack, the 2006 Varanasi bombings, the August 2007 Hyderabad bombings, and the 2008 Mumbai attacks.

The ISI is also accused of supporting Taliban forces and recruiting and training mujahideen to fight in Afghanistan and Kashmir. Based on communication intercepts, US intelligence agencies concluded Pakistan's ISI was behind the attack on the Indian embassy in Kabul on 7 July 2008, a charge that the governments of India and Afghanistan had laid previously.

The ISI has been accused by British Ministry of Defence think tank of indirectly supporting terror activities in the United Kingdom, Afghanistan and Iraq. In June 2008, Afghan authorities accused the ISI of involvement in a plot to assassinate President Hamid Karzai.

The ISI, is believed to be aiding these organisations in eradicating perceived enemies or those opposed to their cause, including India, Russia, China, Israel, the United States, the United Kingdom and other members of NATO. Satellite imagery from the FBI suggest the existence of several terrorist camps in Pakistan, with at least one militant admitting to being trained in the country as part of the going Kashmir Dispute, Pakistan is alleged to be supporting separatist militias Many nonpartisan sources believe that officials within Pakistan's military and the ISI sympathise with and aid Islamic terrorists, saying that the ISI has provided covert but well-documented support to terrorist groups active in Kashmir, including the al-Qaeda affiliate Jaish-e-Mohammed.

President of Afghanistan Hamid Karzai has regularly reiterated allegations that militants operating training camps in Pakistan have used it as a launch platform to attack targets in Afghanistan. He has also urged Western military allies to target extremist hideouts in neighbouring Pakistan. In response to the militants from Afghanistan hiding in the mountainous tribal region of Pakistan, the US and Pakistan agreed to allow US Drone Strikes in Pakistan.

Several detainees at the Guantanamo Bay facility told US interrogators that they were aided by the ISI for attacks in the disputed Kashmir Region.

ISI has been accused of backing criminal organisations like Shahzad Bhatti Network to fuel terror activities in Indian Punjab. In 2025, multiple arrests were made in Delhi and Punjab linking the network to planned attacks. In August 2026, more than 250 alleged network associates were detained and weapons, IEDs, grenades, and live ammunition were seized.

=== Alleged Pakistani Army support of terrorists ===
Former Pakistan President Pervez Musharraf has admitted that Pakistan supported and trained terrorist groups like Lashkar-e-Taiba (LeT) in 1990s to carry out militancy in Kashmir. "From 1979 Pakistan was in favour of religious militancy. The Kashmiri "freedom fighters" including Hafiz Saeed and Zaki ar-Rahman Lakhvi were our heroes at that time. We trained Taliban and sent them to fight against Soviet Union. Taliban, Haqqani, Osama bin Laden and Ayman al-Zawahiri were our heroes then (during the Soviet-Afghan war). Later they became 'villains'." said Pervez Musharraf.

According to Pervez Hoodhboy, "Bin Laden was 'The Golden Goose' that the army had kept under its watch but which, to its chagrin, has now been stolen from under its nose. Until then, the thinking had been to trade in the Goose at the right time for the right price, either in the form of dollars or political concessions".

During the raid on bin Laden's Abbottabad compound, US Navy SEALs were able to recover some 470,000 computer files from a trove of ten hard drives, five computers and around one hundred thumb drives and disks. The documents recovered from the compound contained nothing to support the idea that bin Laden was protected by Pakistani officials or that he was in communication with them. Instead, the documents contained criticism of Pakistani military and future plans for attacks against Pakistani military targets.

However, Pakistan’s leaked Abbottabad Commission report concluded that bin Laden’s prolonged stay in Abbottabad reflected broad institutional failures, describing Pakistan’s elite as both highly incompetent and susceptible to 'infiltration' by extremist sympathisers. After interviewing more than 200 witnesses, the commission could not assign individual blame but held the ISI chiefly responsible for failing to uncover bin Laden’s presence, characterising its performance as either astonishingly inept or indicative of "a grave complicity" by rogue elements within ISI at unidentified levels. It further criticised the wider civil–military bureaucracy for not detecting U.S. intelligence preparations for the 2011 raid and for its ineffective response once the operation was under way.

Former Pakistan Army Chief General Ziauddin Butt had earlier claimed at an October 2011 Pakistan-U.S. relations conference that Osama bin Laden was sheltered in an Intelligence Bureau safe house in Abbottabad by former IB chief Brigadier Ijaz Shah with Musharraf’s knowledge, and suggested while later expressing doubt that General Ashfaq Pervez Kayani might also have known.

Steve Coll stated that as of 2019 no direct evidence showing Pakistani knowledge of bin Laden's presence in Abbottabad had been found, and that captured documents from the Abbottabad compound suggest bin Laden was wary of contact with Pakistani intelligence and police, especially in light of Pakistan's role in the arrest of Khalid Sheikh Mohammed.

Pakistan was also alleged to be responsible for the evacuation of about 5,000 top leaders of the Taliban and Al-Qaeda who were encircled by NATO forces during the 2001 invasion of Afghanistan. This event known as the Kunduz airlift, which is also popularly called the "Airlift of Evil", allegedly involved several Pakistani Air Force transport planes flying multiple sorties over a number of days. However, the validity of these claims has been questioned by the Pentagon. Both United States and Pakistan have rejected that any such airlift took place. General Richard Myers, chief of staff, claimed that Kunduz airfield has been "disabled" by United States attacks. Although part of the airfield could be used, the runway was not long enough for transport aircraft to take off or land. Donald Rumsfeld, US defence secretary, claimed that he had received no report validating or verifying these claims of aircraft moving in or out of the city. He further said that he doubted these claims. According to a 2001 article titled "Overview of State-Sponsored Terrorism" issued by the US Office of the Coordinator for Counterterrorism, "In South Asia, the United States had been increasingly concerned about reports of Pakistani support to terrorist groups and elements active in Kashmir, as well as Pakistani support to the Taliban, which continued to harbour terrorist groups, including Al-Qaeda, the Egyptian Islamic Jihad, al-Jama'a al-Islamiyya, and the Islamic Movement of Uzbekistan." In 2011, American troops allegedly recovered Pakistani military supplies from Taliban insurgents in Afghanistan.

=== Kashmiri insurgents ===
Between 1988 and 2026, there were a total of 63,110 terror incidents allegedly sponsored by Pakistan, in Jammu and Kashmir including 31,791 incidents targeting security forces, and 19,452 incidents involving civilians. More than 47,800 people lost their lives in these attacks. Maulana Allama Nasir Madni, a senior cleric belonging to Pakistan Markazi Muslim League (PMML), has made claims that the proscribed terrorist Hafiz Saeed sent "more than 10,000 young men" to fight in Kashmir.

LeT began carrying out operations in Indian-controlled Kashmir in the 1990s. It actively infiltrated militants across the Line of Control (LoC) from Pakistan to carry out sabotage activities with the help of the ISI and the Pakistan Army. Pakistan Army and Inter-Services Intelligence Directorate (ISI) have long considered Lashkar-e-Taiba to be the country's most reliable proxy against India and the group still provides utility in this regard as well as the potential for leverage at the negotiating table.

In May 2025, during a press briefing in New Delhi, Indian Foreign Secretary Vikram Misri presented a photograph showing a U.S.-designated terrorist leading prayers at a funeral where individuals killed in Indian airstrikes were wrapped in Pakistan’s national flag and given state honours. In September 2025, a controversy followed when Jaish-e-Mohammad commander Masood Ilyas Kashmiri, speaking at the 38th Mission Mustafa conference, claimed in a viral video that Pakistan Army Chief Asim Munir had sent generals to attend the funerals of those killed in the 7 May airstrikes during the 2025 India–Pakistan conflict.

=== Al Qaeda leaders killed or captured in Pakistan ===
Critics had accused Pakistan's military and security establishment of protecting Osama bin Laden, until he was found and killed by US forces. This issue was expected to worsen US ties with Pakistan. Bin Laden was killed in his residence of more than five years, in Abbottabad, Pakistan. It was an expensive compound, less than 100 kilometres' drive from the capital, Islamabad, probably built specifically for Bin Laden. The compound is 1.3 kilometres (3/4 mile) southwest of the Pakistan Military Academy (PMA), a prominent military academy that has been compared to Sandhurst in Britain and West Point in the United States. Pakistan's President Zardari has denied that his country's security forces may have sheltered Osama bin Laden.

Steve Coll states that as of 2019 there is no direct evidence showing Pakistani knowledge of bin Laden's presence in Abbottabad. Documents captured from the Abbottabad compound generally show that bin Laden was wary of contact with Pakistani intelligence and police, especially in light of Pakistan's role in the arrest of Khalid Sheikh Mohammed. According to Coll: "C.I.A. and other Obama administration officials have said they possess no evidence—no intercepts, no unreleased documents from Abbottabad—that Kayani or Pasha or any other I.S.I. officer knew where bin Laden was hiding. Given the hostility toward Pakistan prevalent in the American national security bureaucracy by 2011, if the United States possessed such hard evidence, it almost certainly would have leaked." In response to America's exposure of bin Laden's hiding place, Pakistan moved to shut down the informant network that led the Americans there.

In addition to Osama bin Laden and Khalid Sheikh Mohammed, Ramzi bin al-Shibh, Abu Zubaydah, Abu Laith al Libi and Sheikh Said Masri have all been captured or killed inside Pakistan with Khalid Sheikh Mohammed being arrested with Pakistan's direct assistance.

== Links to terrorist groups ==
Pakistan was alleged to be a safe haven for terrorist groups including:

1. Al-Qaeda (until 2004)
2. Lashkar-e-Taiba (LeT)
3. Jaish-e-Mohammed (JeM)
4. Sipah-e-Sahaba (until 2003)
5. Jaysh al-Adl (until 2024)
6. Al Badr Mujahideen (until 2022)
7. Harkat ul Mujahideen (until 2019)
8. ISIS-KP (until 2016)

Pakistan has, however, denied providing safe haven to any terrorist group. In 2008, the US stated that the next attack on the US could originate in Pakistan. There are instances of Pakistan hosting terrorist camps such as the following:

- In June 2009, India's army chief, General Deepak Kapoor, used a meeting with US national security adviser Jim Jones to claim that Pakistan was home to 43 "terrorist camps".
- Many Kashmiri groups also maintain their headquarters in Pakistan-administered Kashmir, which is cited as further proof by the Indian Government.
- Open public fund raising and recruitment of terrorists from Pakistani society.

=== Militant outfits about Pakistan ===
In Kashmir conflict, India has been consistent in alleging that Pakistan was involved in training and arming underground militant groups to fight Indian forces in Kashmir.

In 2005, JKLF had openly admitted that more than 3,000 militants from various nationalities were still being trained.

==== Jaish-e-Mohammed ====
Jaish-e-Mohammed – Other resources also concur, stating that Pakistan's military and ISI both include personnel who sympathise with and help Islamic militants, adding that ISI has provided covert but well-documented support to terrorist groups active in Kashmir, including the Jaish-e-Mohammed. Pakistan has denied any involvement in the terrorist activities in Kashmir, arguing that it only provides political and moral support to the so-called "secessionist" & jihadist groups. Many Kashmiri terrorist groups also maintain their headquarters in Pakistan-administered Kashmir, which is cited as further proof by the Indian Government.

==== Lashkar-e-Taiba and Jama'at-ud-Dawa ====
The militant group Lashkar-e-Taiba (LeT) is widely blamed for the 26/11 Mumbai attacks. The US has put a $10m bounty for its founder Hafiz Muhammad Saeed. Saeed now heads the Jama'at-ud-Dawa (JuD) group, widely seen as a front for LeT. LeT was banned by Pakistan in 2002 after it allegedly carried out an attack on the Indian parliament. JuD is currently banned by the US, the EU, India and Russia as a terrorist organisation. In June 2014, Washington declared JuD an LeT affiliate and announced head money for JuD's political wing chief and Saeed's brother-in-law Abd al-Rahman Makki. Zaki ar-Rahman Lakhvi, the leader of Lashkar-e-Taiba and allegedly the planner of 26/11 Mumbai attacks was released in Pakistan which caused condemnations in India. Later in 2026, Indian media alleged that Pakistan removed the photographs, LeT affiliations and detailed operational roles of two terrorists namely Muhammad Khan from Turbat, and Abdul Rehman from Bahawalnagar, from the FIA's Red Book retaining only their names. Muhammad Khan had allegedly provided the boat to Al-Hussaini to transport the attackers to Mumbai.

JuD regularly conducts mass rallies and congregation, advocating jihad in Kashmir. For its December 2014 rally, Pakistan ran two special trains to carry the crowd to Lahore. India's foreign ministry termed this as nothing short of mainstreaming of terrorism and a terrorist. The congregation was held near Pakistan's national monument, the Minar-e-Pakistan and a security of 4000 policemen was provided. JuD also asks donations for its anti-India and pro-jihad campaigns.

LeT commanders have also praised attacks in many videos. For instance, in 2026, Abu Musa Kashmiri stated in a viral video that the 2025 Pahalgam Attack propelled Pakistan's international standing forward. His remarks contradicted Pakistan's previous denials of involvement.

=== Sympathising with militants ===
==== Taliban and Haqqani Network ====
Pakistan did not designate the Afghan Taliban as a terrorist organisation. Pakistan was also accused of giving aid to the Taliban, which include[s] soliciting funding for the Taliban, bankrolling Taliban operations, providing diplomatic support as the Taliban's virtual emissaries abroad, arranging training for Taliban fighters, recruiting skilled and unskilled manpower to serve in Taliban armies, planning and directing offensives, providing and facilitating shipments of ammunition and fuel, and on several occasions apparently directly providing combat support, as stated by the Human Rights Watch. The normally reticent United Nations Organization (UNO) has also publicly increased pressure on Pakistan on its inability to control its Afghanistan border and not restricting the activities of Taliban leaders who have been declared by the UN as terrorists.

Former Chairman of the Joint Chiefs of Staff of US, Mike Mullen described the Haqqani Network as the "veritable arm of Pakistan's ISI". Mullen said the country's main intelligence agency ISI was supporting Haqqani network, who are blamed for an assault on the US embassy in Kabul in September 2011 and also the September 2011 NATO truck bombing which injured 77 coalition soldiers and killed five Afghan civilians.

"Operation Zarb-e-Azb has helped disrupt Haqqani network's ability to launch attacks on Afghan territory", a senior commander for US and NATO forces in Afghanistan, Lieutenant General Joseph Anderson said in a Pentagon-hosted video briefing from Afghanistan in 2014. He added that the Haqqani network was now fractured too.

In a November 2014 interview to BBC Urdu, Adviser to the Pakistani Prime Minister on National Security and Foreign Affairs, Sartaj Aziz said that Pakistan should not target militants like the Afghan Taliban and Haqqani Network, who do not threaten Pakistan's security. After it was raised in Pakistan's parliament, Pakistan's Foreign Office clarified that the statement was said in historical context.

In October 2017, US Secretary of State Rex W. Tillerson accused Pakistan to stop providing support and shelter to terrorist groups, including the Afghan Taliban and the Haqqani Network. He stated, "Too many terrorist groups were finding safe haven in Pakistan, with growing threat to the stability of its government. Such safe havens would no longer be tolerated."

== International isolation ==
Pakistan has been threatened in the past of international isolation on allegations of its inability in counter terrorism. The 2016 SAARC summit which was to be held in Islamabad in 2016 was cancelled after being boycotted by four nations – India, Afghanistan, Bangladesh and Bhutan. Between 2018 and 2022, Pakistan was listed on the FATF greylist for alleged money laundering and terrorism financing, which made it difficult for the country to get financial help from international institutions, including the International Monetary Fund, World Bank Asian Development Bank, and European Union.

=== United States ===
US National Security Advisor James L Jones sent a message in the past to Pakistan saying that double standards on terrorism were not acceptable.

In September 2016, the Chairman of the US House Subcommittee on Terrorism, Congressman Ted Poe from Texas, along with Dana Rohrabacher from California, introduced a bill in the United States House of Representatives calling for a declaration of Pakistan as a state sponsor of terrorism. The bill HR 6069 requires the US president to issue a report within 90 days detailing Pakistan's role in supporting international terrorism followed by discussion from the US Secretary of State. Ted Poe said in a statement that Pakistan was not only an untrustworthy ally but it has also aided and abetted the enemies of the United States. He called the 2016 Uri attack the latest consequence of Pakistan’s longstanding irresponsible policy of supporting and providing operational space for jihadi terrorist groups. U.S. Senator John McCain said that the bill would not be successful, and pointed out that it was moved by a small minority within the Congress. McCain also acknowledged Pakistan's losses in the fight against terrorism.

Under the first Trump administration, the U.S. State Department accused Pakistan of failing to respond to terrorist networks operating on its soil, and in 2018, terminated all military aid to Pakistan.

=== United Kingdom ===
In July 2010, British Prime Minister David Cameron accused the Pakistani government of double standards: "We cannot tolerate in any sense the idea that this country is allowed to look both ways and is able, in any way, to promote the export of terror, whether to India or whether to Afghanistan or anywhere else in the world." However, UK Foreign Secretary William Hague, who was travelling with the prime minister Cameron, clarified Cameron's remarks: "He wasn't accusing anybody of double dealing. He was also saying that Pakistan's made great progress in tackling terrorism. Of course there have been many terrorism outrages in Pakistan itself." Cameron's remarks sparked a diplomatic row with Pakistan, where he came under attack by officials and politicians who strongly criticised his comments. In December 2010, he attempted to visit Pakistan while on a tour to Afghanistan in an effort to mend relations. However, his visit was refused by Pakistan, notably as a snub to his remarks.

In 2002,British Prime Minister Tony Blair asked Pakistan to take action against Terror groups operating from its territory, including Islamic militant groups fighting Indian forces in Kashmir.

Furthermore, the United Kingdom investigated cases of terrorism involving British citizens with reported links to Pakistan-based networks. The 7 July 2005 London bombings included individuals who had traveled to Pakistan prior to the attacks. Official inquiries concluded that the bombers were primarily radicalised within the UK, though trips abroad were examined as part of the investigation. Similarly, the 2006 transatlantic aircraft plot, which aimed to detonate liquid explosives on flights from the UK to North America, involved suspects with reported connections to Pakistan. British and American authorities, in coordination with Pakistani officials, disrupted the plot, which was cited in UK counterterrorism assessments as an example of transnational networks affecting domestic security.

At the Raisina Dialogue held in New Delhi on 16 January 2020, Gareth Bayley, UK's Foreign and Commonwealth Office Director for South Asia, said that terror groups continued to operate from Pakistan territory and posed a threat to regional security.

=== Afghanistan ===
US intelligence officials claim that Pakistan's ISI sponsored the 2008 Indian embassy bombing in Kabul. They say that the ISI officers who aided the attack were not renegades, indicating that their actions might have been authorised by superiors. The attack was carried out by Jalaluddin Haqqani, who runs a network that Western intelligence services say is responsible for a campaign of violence throughout Afghanistan, including the Indian Embassy bombing and the 2008 Kabul Serena Hotel attack. Citizenship and Immigration Minister of Canada Chris Alexander called Pakistan a state sponsor of terrorism that threatens world security in 2014.

In response to the Afghan War documents leak, The Guardian had a very different take on allegations that Pakistan is sponsoring terrorism. Its Sunday, 25 July 2010 article by Declan Walsh states: "But for all their eye-popping details, the intelligence files, which are mostly collated by junior officers relying on informants and Afghan officials, fail to provide a convincing smoking gun for ISI complicity. Most of the reports are vague, filled with incongruent detail, or crudely fabricated. The same characters – famous Taliban commanders, well-known ISI officials – and scenarios repeatedly pop up. And few of the events predicted in the reports subsequently occurred. A retired senior American officer said ground-level reports were considered to be a mixture of "rumours, bullshit and second-hand information" and were weeded out as they passed up the chain of command".

Afghanistan–Pakistan relations have become more strained after the Afghan government began openly accusing Pakistan of using its ISI spy network in aiding the Taliban and other militants. Pakistan usually denies these allegations but has said in the past that it does not have full control of the actions of the ISI. There have been a number of reports about the Afghanistan–Pakistan skirmishes, which usually occur when army soldiers are in hot pursuit chasing insurgents who cross the border back and forth. This leads to tensions between the two states, especially after hearing reports of civilian casualties.

After the May 2011 death of Osama bin Laden in Pakistan, many prominent Afghan figures began being assassinated, including Mohammed Daud Daud, Ahmad Wali Karzai, Jan Mohammad Khan, Ghulam Haider Hamidi, Burhanuddin Rabbani and others. Also in the same year, the Afghanistan–Pakistan skirmishes intensified and many large scale attacks by the Pakistani-based Haqqani network took place across Afghanistan. This led to the United States warning Pakistan of a possible military action against the Haqqanis in the Federally Administered Tribal Areas. The U.S. blamed Pakistan's government, mainly Pakistani Army and its ISI spy network as the masterminds behind all of this.

"In choosing to use violent extremism as an instrument of policy, the government of Pakistan, and most especially the Pakistani army and ISI, jeopardizes not only the prospect of our strategic partnership but Pakistan's opportunity to be a respected nation with legitimate regional influence. They may believe that by using these proxies, they are hedging their bets or redressing what they feel is an imbalance in regional power. But in reality, they have already lost that bet."

— Admiral Mike Mullen, Chairman of the Joint Chiefs of Staff

U.S. Ambassador to Pakistan, Cameron Munter, told Radio Pakistan that the attack that took place in Kabul was the work of the Haqqani network. There is evidence linking the Haqqani Network to the Pakistan government. Other top U.S. officials such as Hillary Clinton and Leon Panetta made similar statements. Despite all of this, Afghan President Hamid Karzai labelled Pakistan as Afghanistan's "twin brother". Such words in diplomatic talks mean that Afghanistan "cannot turn enemy against the state of Pakistan to please others". The two states are working together to find solutions to the problems affecting them. This includes possible defence cooperation and intelligence sharing as well as further enhancing the two-way trade and abolishment of visas for "holders of diplomatic passports to facilitate visa free travel for the diplomats from the two nations."

After the May 2017 Kabul attack, the Afghan National Directorate of Security (NDS) claimed that the blast was planned by the Afghan insurgent group Haqqani Network, and reiterated allegations that those elements had support and presence across the border in Pakistan. Afghan President Ashraf Ghani stated that Pakistan has instigated an undeclared war of aggression against the country. Pakistan's Foreign Ministry spokesman, Nafees Zakaria rejected the Afghan allegations as "baseless".

The Washington Post claimed that the 2021 Taliban offensive was inextricably linked to Pakistan. According to The New York Times, Afghan tribal leaders said that the Pakistani military waved a surge of new fighters across the border from sanctuaries inside Pakistan.

After the Taliban took over Afghanistan in 2021, then Pakistan Prime minister Imran Khan expressed his happiness and support to the Taliban, said, Afghanistan had broken "shackles of slavery".

Despite the Taliban re-establishment of an Islamic emirate in Afghanistan, Pakistan relations have deteriorated with Afghanistan and accusing each other of supporting terrorism.

=== India ===
The government of Pakistan has been accused of aiding terrorist organisations operating on their soil who have attacked neighbouring India. Pakistan claimed that these acts were committed by non-state actors. US Secretary of State Condoleezza Rice had stated that the actors were still Pakistan's responsibility to which President Asif Ali Zardari had to agree.

India alleged that the 2008 Mumbai terror attacks originated in Pakistan, and that the attackers were in touch with a Pakistani colonel and other handlers in Pakistan. The testimonies of Ajmal Kasab, the only surviving terrorist captured, and David Headley, both who were implicated for their roles in the Mumbai attacks, pointed out to significant ISI involvement in the activities of the LeT, including the Mumbai attacks. This led to a UN ban on one such organisation, the Jama'at-ud-Da'wah, which the Pakistani government is yet to enforce. The 2008 Mumbai attacks led to a large scale deterioration in diplomatic relations between India and Pakistan in the aftermath.

On 5 April 2006, the Indian police arrested six Islamic militants, including a cleric who helped plan bomb blasts in Varanasi. The cleric is believed to be a commander of a banned South Asian Islamic militant group, Harkat-ul-Jihad al-Islami, and is linked to the ISI.

Pakistan denied involvement in militant activities in Kashmir, though President Asif Ali Zardari admitted in July 2010 that militants had been deliberately created and nurtured by past governments as a policy to achieve some short-term tactical objectives stating that they were "heroes" until 9/11.

In October 2010, former Pakistan President and former head of the Pakistan Army, Pervez Musharraf revealed that Pakistani armed forces trained militant groups to fight Indian forces in Kashmir. Many Kashmiri terror groups designated as terrorist organisations by the US still maintain their headquarters in Pakistan-administered Kashmir. This is cited by the Indian government as further proof that Pakistan supports terrorism. Many of the terrorist organisations are banned by the UN, but continue to operate under different names. Even the normally reticent United Nations (UN) has also publicly increased pressure on Pakistan on its inability to control its Afghanistan border and not restricting the activities of Taliban leaders who have been declared by the UN as terrorists. Both the federal and state governments in India continue to accuse Pakistan of helping several banned terrorist organisations, including the Indian organisations unhappy with their own Government, like the ULFA in Assam.

Apart from Kashmir, Pakistan has also been accused by India of supporting insurgency in Punjab province of India. India alleges that Pakistan has provided support to separatist Sikh terror outfits in an attempt to create independent state of Khalistan. Pakistan has rejected all accusations made by India. An Indian MLA from Punjab believes that Pakistan support to Sikh separatist outfits is an attempt to seek revenge for Indian role during the Bangladesh Liberation War. Former Pakistani army chief Mirza Aslam Beg in an interview embraced jihad against India and opportunity to use Kartarpur corridor to assist Khalistan movement.

In 2019, Pakistani Prime Minister publicly discouraged Pakistani people from going to Kashmir to do jihad. People who went to Kashmir will do an injustice to the Kashmiri people. Most of the Pakistani militants who had crossed the border over the years and were caught by the Indian security forces were found to belong to the Punjab province of Pakistan.

In April 2025, the Pahalgam Terrorist Attack was attributed to Pakistan. One of the reasons behind such an accusation by India was the discovery that Hashim Musa, an ex-Pakistan Army Special Forces soldier, was the prime suspect in the attack. Another reason was that The Resistance Front, which India views as a proxy of Lashkar-e-Taiba (LeT), had initially claimed responsibility for the attack. The attack prompted an armed response from India. The Indian forces targeted nine "terror camps" in the initial phases of Operation Sindoor. In May 2025, Indian security forces conducted Operation Keller in Shopian, Jammu and Kashmir, eliminating three terrorists affiliated with Lashkar-e-Taiba and The Resistance Front, both considered Pakistan-based terrorist groups operating in India. In late June 2025, Indian investigators stated that all three militants involved in the 22 April attack on tourists near Pahalgam in Jammu and Kashmir were Pakistani nationals affiliated with the UN-proscribed terror group LeT. The National Investigation Agency (NIA) made the claim following the arrest of two local residents accused of sheltering the attackers. Police had earlier released sketches identifying two suspects as Pakistanis and one as a local. Pakistan did not comment on the allegations. In July 2025, Indian Home Minister Amit Shah confirmed the Pakistani identity of the Pahalgam attackers through recovered Pakistani voter IDs, Pakistan-made chocolates, and identification by detained locals who had supplied them food, following their killing in a military operation dubbed "Operation Mahadev" near Srinagar. At the Eightieth session of United Nations General Assembly in September 2025, Indian External Affairs Minister S. Jaishankar referenced Operation Sindoor, stating that India had acted within its rights to protect its citizens from terrorism and had successfully held those responsible accountable. In an interview with CNN, Ambassador of India to the United States, Vinay Mohan Kwatra referred to the perpetrators of the Pahalgam Terror attack and Pakistan-sponsored terrorism in strongly critical terms, describing them as "lowlifes" and "subhuman monsters", which drew widespread attention. Following the Pahalgam Terror attack, an interview of the Indian High Commissioner to the United Kingdom, Vikram Doraiswami with Yalda Hakim on Sky News gained widespread attention, during which he discussed issues related to how Pakistan Armed Forces is sponsoring terrorism against India and in the world.

As a result of the 2008 Mumbai attacks, India has not played bilateral cricket with Pakistan and, since 2009, has not allowed Pakistani players to participate in the lucrative cricket league, the Indian Premier League (IPL), and the Indian cricket team no longer tours Pakistan. Indians also banned Pakistani actors, singers or directors to work in Hindi cinema and the Indian film industry. After the Pulwama terrorist attack, All Indian Cine Workers' Association announced a total ban on Pakistani artists and actors from working in India. A majority of the people in India also opposed against having any sports or cultural ties with Pakistan. Following the Pahalgam attack in April 2025, the Government of India suspended the Indus Waters Treaty, and revoked medical visas issued to Pakistani citizens. Furthermore, major drive nationwide to hunt and deport illegal immigrants from Pakistan and Bangladesh was also intensified, with many of these immigrants possessing fraudulent voter IDs and ration cards. During the 2025 Asia Cup and the 2026 T20 World Cup, players from Team India refused to shake hands with the Pakistani team following the toss and after India won the matches against Pakistan.

=== Bangladesh ===
In two separate incidents officials of the Pakistani High Commission in Dhaka were alleged to be financing the terrorist activities of the banned Jamaat-ul-Mujahideen Bangladesh (JMB) organisation. Diplomatic official Mazhar Khan was charged by Bangladesh's foreign ministry of running an illegal Indian currency business in Dhaka beside alleged links with militants. However, Pakistan's foreign office maintains that allegations against him are baseless and the incident is unfortunate.

In December 2015, Pakistan decided to withdraw second secretary Farina Arshad after the Bangladeshi authorities asked the diplomat to leave for reportedly having extended financial support to a suspected militant who faces spying charges. JMB operative Idris Sheikh, who also holds Pakistani nationality had claimed he had received money from her and was in contact with her for some time. Pakistan has withdrawn one of its diplomats from Bangladesh after "harassment", the foreign ministry said. A formal statement from Islamabad dismissed the charges as "baseless", adding: "An incessant and orchestrated media campaign was launched against her on spurious charges".

Pakistan has also been accused of radicalising Rohingyas in Bangladesh. In 2020, Indian intelligence claimed that Pakistan's ISI was plotting a huge conspiracy against India by funding JMB for training 40 Rohingyas in Cox's Bazar to carry out attacks in India. An installment of at least $117,000 was funnelled through Saudi Arabia and Malaysia for it.

=== Nepal ===
At a high-level seminar held in Kathmandu on July 9, 2025, Sunil Bahadur Thapa, Advisor to the President of Nepal, warned that Lashkar-e-Taiba (LeT) and Jaish-e-Mohammed (JeM)—both UN-designated terrorist organisations with ties to Al-Qaida—operate from Pakistan, pose serious threats to India, and may use Nepal as a transit route. Dr. Dinesh Bhattarai, former diplomat and advisor to Nepal’s former prime minister, condemned the Pahalgam terror attack in India, describing it as a brutal act in which victims were executed after being asked to reveal their religion.

Dr. Pramod Jaiswal, Research Director at the Nepal Institute for International Cooperation and Engagement, stated that Pakistan has long functioned as the epicentre of terrorism in South Asia, with a record of harbouring extremist groups. Sumitra Karki, Deputy Executive Director of the same institute, referenced the 1999 hijacking of Indian Airlines Flight IC-814 from Kathmandu and the 2025 Pahalgam attack by LeT, which killed 26 people—including one Nepali national—as indicators of Nepal’s exposure to cross-border terrorism supported by Pakistan.

=== United Nations ===
In September 2025, during an emergency meeting of the UN Security Council, convened in response to Israeli airstrike on Hamas leadership in Qatar, Israel’s UN Ambassador Danny Danon defended the action by drawing a parallel to the 2011 U.S. operation that killed Osama bin Laden in Pakistan. He argued that just as bin Laden was eliminated on foreign soil without questioning the legality or location, the same principle should apply to Israel’s targeting of Hamas operatives. Danon asserted that there was no immunity for bin Laden, and similarly, there should be none for members of Hamas. Danon also directly addressed Pakistan’s UN Ambassador Asim Iftikhar Ahmad, stating, "When bin Laden was eliminated in Pakistan, the question asked was not 'why target a terrorist on foreign soil?' No one asked that question. The question was, 'Why was a terrorist given shelter at all?' The same question must be asked today. There was no immunity for bin Laden, and there can be no immunity for Hamas."

During the 61st session of the UN Human Rights Council, Pakistan received criticism from activists and Islamic scholars. Islamic scholar Maulana Bisharat Hussain Sakafi from Poonch condemned Pakistan's cross-border terrorism that claimed more than 100 civilian lives in his district between 2021 and 2023. Javed Beigh, a prominent activist from Budgam, testified that children from Kashmir had been radicalised through various channels by handlers operating from Pakistan. He also criticised use of LeT to target innocents based on their religious identity.

=== Condemnation by independent groups ===
In 2020, Pakistan faced criticism from UN Watch regarding its membership in the United Nations Human Rights Council (UNHRC), particularly in response to Pakistan’s stance on freedom of expression linked to a terrorist attack in France.

In September 2025, during a United Nations session on the Israeli airstrike on Hamas leadership in Qatar, Hillel Neuer, human rights lawyer and executive director of UN Watch, accused Pakistan of being a state sponsor of terrorism. Neuer highlighted Qatar’s "harboring of terrorists" and referenced the 2011 killing of al-Qaeda chief Osama bin Laden in Pakistan. The Pakistani delegate interrupted, rejecting what it called unfounded accusations and violations of sovereignty. The UNHRC chair then allowed Neuer four seconds to finish, during which he reiterated that Pakistan was a state sponsor of terror.

== See also ==
- Inter-Services Intelligence activities in Afghanistan
- Inter-Services Intelligence activities in India
- Iran and state-sponsored terrorism
- Israel and state-sponsored terrorism
- Qatar and state-sponsored terrorism
- Saudi Arabia–United States relations#Allegations of funding terrorism
- Terrorism and the Soviet Union
- United States and state-sponsored terrorism
