= Soviet Union and state terrorism =

Soviet Union and state terrorism may refer to:

- Terrorism and the Soviet Union
- Terrorism in the Soviet Union
- The Great Purge, which is often described as state terror among people who grant recognition to that concept
