= Richard A. Falkenrath =

Richard Falkenrath
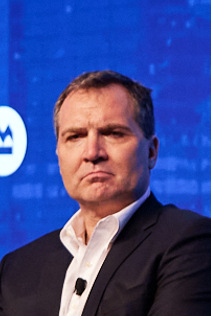

Personal details
- Born: March 25, 1969 (age 57)
- Party: Republican
- Education: Occidental College (BA); King's College London (MA, PhD)

Richard A. Falkenrath Jr. (born March 25, 1969) served as deputy commissioner of counter-terrorism of the New York City Police Department from 2006 to 2010. He was the third person to hold this position. His predecessors were Frank Libutti and Michael A. Sheehan.

== Education ==
Falkenrath is a summa cum laude graduate of Occidental College, with degrees in economics and international relations. He holds a Ph.D. from the department of war studies at King's College London, where he was a Marshall Scholar.

== Academic career ==
From September 1993 until December 2000, Falkenrath worked at the Harvard University's John F. Kennedy School of Government, first as a postdoctoral research fellow at the Belfer Center for Science and International Affairs; then as Executive Director of the Center; and finally as Assistant Professor of Public Policy.

Additionally, during this time he was founder and co-principal investigator of the Executive Session on Domestic Preparedness; a member of the Advisory Panel to Assess Domestic Response Capabilities for Terrorism Involving Weapons of Mass Destruction (the "Gilmore Commission"); a member of the board of visitors of the National Emergency Management Institute; a member of the Director of Central Intelligence's Nonproliferation Advisory Panel; a visiting research fellow at the Deutsche Gesellschaft für Auswärtige Politik; and a consultant to the Defense Science Board and the RAND Corporation.

== White House ==
In December 2000, Falkenrath joined the Bush-Cheney presidential transition team, where he was involved in preparing for the presidential transition within the National Security Council. Immediately after the January 2001 presidential inauguration, Falkenrath joined the White House staff, serving until May 2004. His initial position was director for proliferation strategy on the National Security Council staff, where he was responsible for biological weapons proliferation and preparedness, missile defense, and Asian proliferation issues.

After the terrorist attacks of September 11, 2001, Falkenrath was named Special Assistant to the President and Senior Director for Policy and Plans within the Office of Homeland Security. In January 2003, he was promoted to Deputy Assistant to the President and Deputy Homeland Security Advisor. In these capacities, he was responsible for developing and coordinating all aspects of U.S. homeland security policy and law, as well as counterterrorism threat assessment and response at all levels. He was the principal author of the National Strategy for Homeland Security and was centrally involved in the stand-up of the Department of Homeland Security, the Terrorist Threat Integration Center (the predecessor to today's National Counterterrorism Center), and the FBI's Terrorist Screening Center.

After leaving the White House, Falkenrath became the Stephen and Barbara Friedman Senior Fellow at The Brookings Institution in Washington, D.C. He was also an advisor and spokesman for Bush-Cheney 2004 reelection campaign and a security analyst at CNN.

== NYPD ==
At the NYPD, Falkenrath has criticized the federal government for reducing homeland security funding for New York City's subways.

== Bibliography ==
- Prepared Statement before the Committee on Homeland Security, United States House of Representatives, March 6, 2007
- "Right Call on Phone Records", Washington Post, May 13, 2006
- "Privacy Fiasco that Needlessly Undermines Security", Financial Times, May 31, 2006
- "Europe's Dangerous Complacency", Financial Times. July 7, 2004
- America's Achilles' Heel: Nuclear, Biological, and Chemical Terrorism and Covert Attack; coauthored with Robert Newman and Bradley Thayer (MIT Press, 1998)
- Avoiding Nuclear Anarchy: Containing the Threat of Loose Russian Nuclear Weapons and Fissile Material, coauthored with Graham T. Allison, Owen R. Cote, and Steven E. Miller (The MIT Press, 1996)
- "Grading the War on Terrorism", Foreign Affairs, January/February 2006
- "The 9/11 Commission Review Report: A Review Essay", International Security, Winter 2004
- "Problems of Preparedness", International Security, Spring 2001
- "Confronting Nuclear, Biological, and Chemical Terrorism", Survival, Autumn 1998

== Family ==
Falkenrath was raised in Mendocino, California, and currently resides in Connecticut with his wife and two children.

== Affiliations ==
He is a member of the Aspen Strategy Group.

In 2020, Falkenrath, along with over 130 other former Republican national security officials, signed a statement that asserted that President Trump was unfit to serve another term, and "To that end, we are firmly convinced that it is in the best interest of our nation that Vice President Joe Biden be elected as the next President of the United States, and we will vote for him."
