= Stanislav Lunev =

Soviet military officer

- Станислав Лунев
- Born: 1946 (age 79–80); Leningrad, Russian SFSR, Soviet Union
- Military career
- Allegiance: Soviet Union (to 1991); Russian Federation
- Branch: GRU
- Service years: ?—1992
- Rank: Colonel
- Other work: Through the Eyes of the Enemy

Stanislav Lunev (Russian: Станислав Лунев; born 1946 in Leningrad) is a former Soviet military officer, as of 1992 the highest-ranking GRU officer to defect from Russia to the United States.

== Biography ==
Stanislav Lunev was born in Leningrad, to the family of a Soviet Army officer. He graduated from the Suvorov Military School in Vladikavkaz and then from Joint Arms High Command Military Academy. He then worked as a GRU intelligence officer in Singapore in 1978, in China from 1980, and in the United States from 1988. He defected to U.S. authorities in 1992. Since then, he has worked as a consultant to the FBI and the CIA.

== Writings ==
Lunev published a book of memoirs, Through the Eyes of the Enemy. In the book, he described his work as a Soviet spy. He said that his work was extremely successful because he followed a very basic rule that "the best spy will be everyone's best friend, not a shadowy figure in the corner."

In the book, he also described some active measures against the "Main adversary" and alleged that "the GRU and the KGB helped to fund just about every antiwar movement and organization in America and abroad." According to Lunev, the Soviet Union allegedly spent more money on funding of U.S. anti-war movements during the Vietnam War than on funding and arming the Viet Cong forces.

== Nuclear sabotage operations ==
Lunev is mostly known for his description of nuclear sabotage operations that have allegedly been prepared by the KGB and GRU across the Western world. It was known from other sources that large arms caches were hidden by the KGB in many countries for these planned activities. They were booby-trapped with "Lightning" explosive devices. One such cache, which was identified by Vasili Mitrokhin, exploded when Swiss authorities tried to remove it from a location in the woods near Bern. Several others caches were removed successfully.

Lunev asserted that some of the hidden caches could contain portable tactical nuclear weapons known as RA-115 "suitcase bombs". Such bombs have been prepared to assassinate US leaders in the event of war, according to him. Lunev states that he had personally looked for hiding places for weapons caches in the Shenandoah Valley area and that "it is surprisingly easy to smuggle nuclear weapons into the US, either across the Mexican border or using a small transport missile that can slip undetected when launched from a Russian airplane.

U.S. Congressman Curt Weldon supported claims by Lunev but noted that Lunev had "exaggerated things" according to the FBI. Searches of the areas identified by Lunev, who admitted that he never planted any weapons in the US, have been conducted, "but law-enforcement officials have never found such weapons caches, with or without portable nuclear weapons."

== Poisoning of Potomac River ==
According to Lunev, a probable scenario in the event of war would have been poisoning the Potomac River with chemical or biological weapons, "targeting the residents of Washington, D.C." He also considered it "likely" that GRU operatives placed "poison supplies near the tributaries to major US reservoirs."

Those allegations have been confirmed by former SVR officer Kouzminov, who was responsible for transporting pathogens from around the world for Soviet program of biological weapons in the 1980s and the early 1990s. He described a variety of biological warfare acts that would be carried out on the order of the Russian President in the event of hostilities, including poisoning public drinking-water supplies and food processing plants.

== See also ==
- Genrikh Lyushkov, the highest-ranking NKVD defector
