= Daniel Byman =

American political scientist (born 1967)

Daniel L. Byman
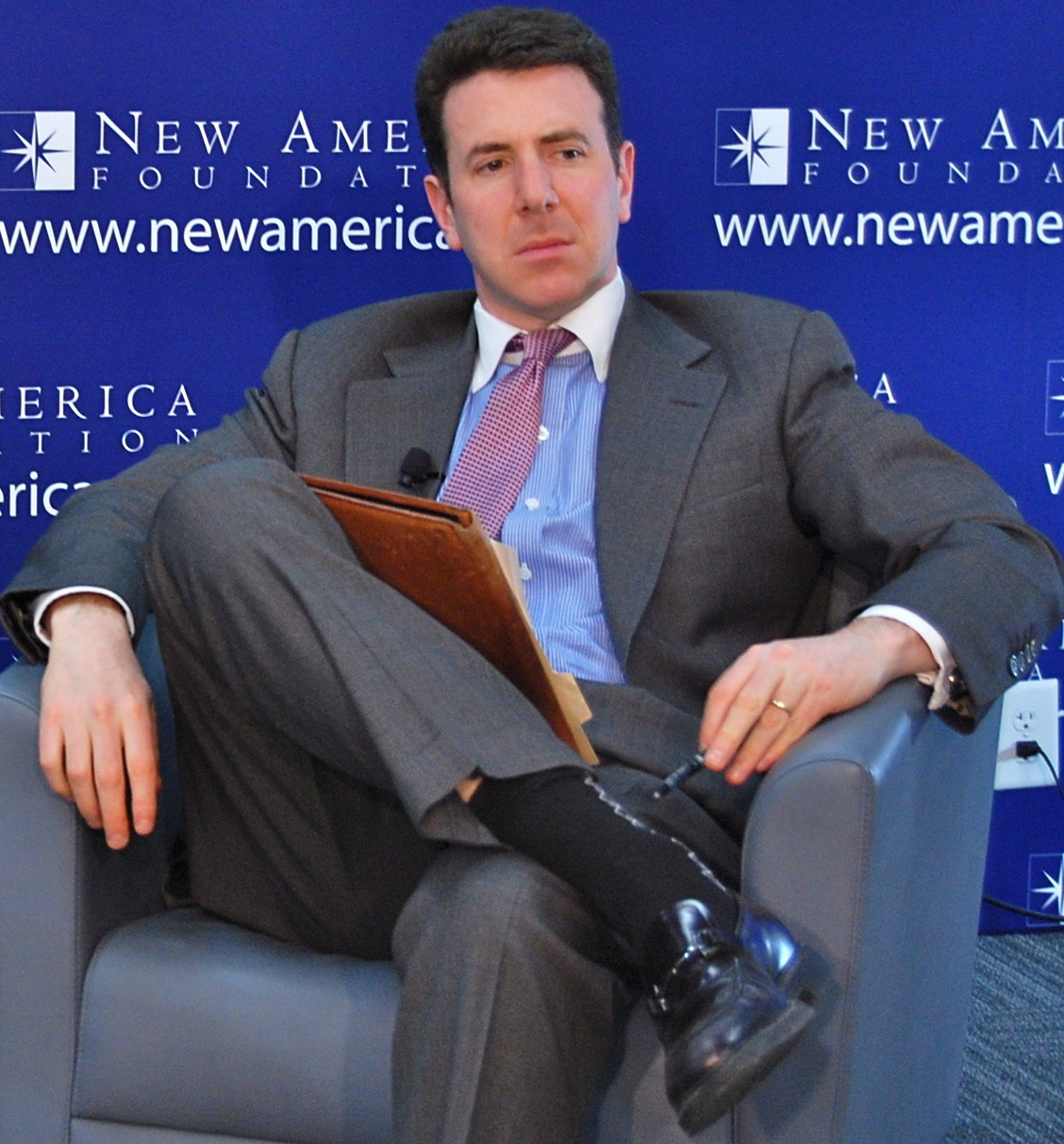
- Byman in March 2012
- Born: Daniel L. Byman; 1967 (age 58–59); United States
- Education: Amherst College (BA)
- Alma mater: Massachusetts Institute of Technology (PhD)
- Occupation: Political scientist
- Employer: Georgetown University

Daniel L. Byman (born 1967) is an American political scientist. His research focuses on terrorism, Counterterrorism and the Middle East. Byman is currently a professor in Georgetown University's Walsh School of Foreign Service and director of Georgetown's security studies program He is a former Vice-Dean of the school.

Byman is Senior Advisor to the U.S. Department of State as part of the International Security Advisory Board, a senior fellow with the Warfare, Irregular Threats, and Terrorism Project at the Center for Strategic and International Studies, and the Foreign Policy Editor for Lawfare.

Byman played key roles in the post 9/11 intelligence committees and in many distinguished think tanks. He was a senior fellow at the Center for Middle East Policy at the Brookings Institution. He was also the research director of the Center for Middle East Public Policy at the RAND Corporation.

He is also the lead course instructor for Georgetown's massive open online course on Terrorism and Counter Terrorism.

== Education ==
Byman holds a BA from Amherst College and a PhD from Massachusetts Institute of Technology.

== Career ==
Byman was a professional staff member on both the 9/11 Commission and the Joint 9/11 Inquiry staff of the House and Senate Intelligence Committees.

Early in his career, he served as an analyst for the U.S. government.

He has argued that al-Qaeda core has become very weak, and that their leader is not officially named (though Saif al-Adel is the de facto leader) is evidence of that weakness.

== Publications ==
Byman's book Road Warriors: Foreign Fighters in the Armies of Jihad, published by Oxford University Press in 2019, provides a sweeping history of the jihadist foreign fighter movement. He also authored the book, Al Qaeda, the Islamic State, and the Global Jihadist Movement: What Everyone Needs to Know, published by Oxford University Press in 2015.

Byman's article in The Atlantic entitled "Left Wing Terrorism is on the Rise" defined terrorism as "attacks or plots by a nonstate actor attempting to achieve a political end and exert a psychological influence on a broad population". With Riley McCabe, Byman analyzed 750 attacks and plots in the United States from 1994 through 2025, finding that 2025 was the first year in which far-left attacks outnumbered far-right attacks.

== Selected bibliography ==
- Trends in Outside Support for Insurgent Movements. Rand Corporation. 2001. ISBN 978-0-8330-3052-8.
- Keeping the Peace: Lasting Solutions to Ethnic Conflicts. JHU Press. 2002. ISBN 978-0-8018-6804-7.
- Daniel Byman; Matthew Waxman (2002). The Dynamics of Coercion: American Foreign Policy and the Limits of Military Might. Cambridge University Press. ISBN 978-0-521-00780-1.
- Deadly Connections: States that Sponsor Terrorism. Cambridge University Press. 2005. ISBN 978-0-521-83973-0.
- Daniel Byman; Kenneth M. Pollack (2007). Things fall apart: containing the spillover from an Iraqi civil war. Brookings Institution Press. ISBN 978-0-8157-1379-1.
- A High Price:The Triumphs and Failures of Israeli Counterterrorism. Oxford University Press, US. 2011. ISBN 978-0-19-983174-6.
- "The Wobbling Red Line in Syria", op-ed, New York Times. May 4, 2013. "Empty threats weaken America's credibility", regarding President Obama's "red line" comment on Syria's chemical weapons.
- Road Warriors: Foreign Fighters in the Armies of Jihad. Oxford University Press. 2019. ISBN 978-0-19-064651-6.
- Spreading hate: the global rise of white supremacist terrorism. New York, NY: Oxford University Press. 2022. ISBN 978-0-19-753761-9. OCLC 1306536004.
