= Suitcase nuclear device =

Nuclear weapon that can be transported in a suitcase

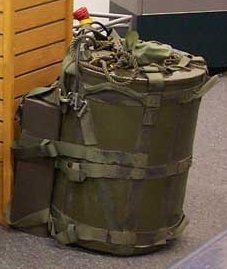
H-912 transport container for Mk-54 SADM

A suitcase nuclear device (also suitcase nuke, suitcase bomb, backpack nuke, snuke, mini-nuke, and pocket nuke) is a tactical nuclear weapon that is portable enough that it could use a suitcase as its delivery method.

During the 1950s and 1960s both the United States and the Soviet Union developed nuclear weapons small enough to be portable in specially designed backpacks.

Neither the United States nor the Soviet Union have ever made public the existence or development of weapons small enough to fit into a normal-sized suitcase or briefcase. The W48 however, does fit the criteria of small, easily disguised, and portable. Its explosive yield was extremely small for a nuclear weapon.

In the mid-1970s, debate shifted from the possibility of developing such a device for the military to concerns over its possible use in nuclear terrorism. The concept became a staple of the spy thriller genre in the later Cold War era.

== Etymology ==
The term "suitcase (nuclear/atomic) bomb" was introduced during the 1950s with the prospect of reducing the size of the smallest tactical nuclear weapons even further, albeit purely as a "figure of speech" for miniaturization, not necessarily for the delivery in actual suitcases.

== Overview ==
The value of portable nuclear weapons lies in their ability to be easily smuggled across borders, transported by means widely available, and placed close to targets of strategic value, or as means to render enemy land uninhabitable. In nuclear weapon design, there is a trade-off in small weapons designs between weight and compact size. Extremely small (as small as 5 inches (13 cm) diameter and 24.4 inches (62 cm) long) linear implosion type weapons, which might conceivably fit in a large briefcase or typical suitcase, have been tested, but the lightest of those weighed nearly 100 pounds (45 kg) and had a maximum yield of only 0.19 kiloton (the Swift nuclear device, tested in Operation Redwing's Yuma test on May 27, 1956). The largest yield of a relatively compact linear implosion device was under 2 kilotons for the cancelled (or never deployed but apparently tested) US W82-1 artillery shell design, with yield under 2 kilotons for a 95-pound (43 kg) artillery shell 6.1 inches (15 cm) in diameter and 34 inches (86 cm) long.

== Soviet Union and Russia ==
The potential existence and whereabouts of suitcase-sized Soviet nuclear bombs became an increasingly fierce subject of debate in the aftermath of the collapse of the Soviet Union. Major concerns regarding the new Russian government's overall security and control of its nuclear stockpile were raised on 30 May 1997, when an American congressional delegation sent to Russia met with General Aleksandr Lebed, former Secretary of the Russian National Security Council. During the meeting, Lebed mentioned the possibility that several portable nuclear suitcase bombs had gone missing. According to Lebed, "during his short tenure as the Secretary of the Security Council in 1996, he received information that the separatist government in Chechnya possessed small nuclear devices. In an attempt to clarify the situation, he created a special commission under the chairmanship of his assistant, Vladimir Denisov. According to Lebed, the commission was only able to locate 48 such munitions of a total of 132, an indication that 84 were lost". However, Lebed subsequently "changed the total number of suitcase nukes several times, stating in the end that the number was between 100 and 500, but probably closer to 100", although "[i]t should be noted that almost nothing is known about the methods of the commission's work". Lebed would make several press releases and give television interviews regarding the matter later in the year.

During an interview with CBS newsmagazine Sixty Minutes on 7 September 1997, Lebed would claim that the Russian military had lost track of more than a hundred out of a total of 250 "suitcase-sized nuclear bombs". Lebed stated that these devices were made to look like suitcases, and that he had learned of their existence only a few years earlier. On 10 September, the Ministry for Atomic Energy of the Russian Federation (MINATOM) rejected Lebed's claims as baseless. "'We don't know what General Lebed is talking about. No such weapons exist,' a ministry spokesman told AFP. 'Perhaps he meant old Soviet nuclear artillery shells, which are all being safely guarded.'" Russian prime minister Viktor Chernomyrdin "ridiculed Lebed's account as "absolute stupidity" and said that "all Russian nuclear weapons are under the total and absolutely reliable control of the Russian armed forces", while a spokesman for the Russian Ministry of Defence, Vladimir Utavenko, stated that "there are no nuclear bombs in Russia out of [the] control of the Russian armed forces." Utavenko also questioned the credibility of Lebed on this particular issue because "he never dealt with nuclear security questions and cannot know the situation." In an interview with Russian news agency Interfax, Lebed's former deputy, Denisov, claimed that he had led a special working group in July 1996 to explore whether any such weapons had been deployed. "According to Denisov, the working group concluded within two months that there were no such devices in the active Russian arsenal and that all the weapons were in "appropriate" storage facilities. However, he said the group could not rule out the possibility that similar weapons were located in Ukraine, Georgia or the Baltic states."

However, despite the Russian government's rejection of Lebed's claims, the resulting public interest from Lebed's television appearances would eventually provoke a congressional hearing in the United States, which was held between 1–2 October 1997 and was intended to discuss "Nuclear Terrorism and Countermeasures." Chief among these talks was the matter of the existence of portable nuclear devices in the arsenal of the former Soviet Union and the possibility of these weapons proliferating across the globe.

Although absent from the hearings himself, Lebed's interviews were frequently cited as a cause for concern throughout them, particularly his claims regarding the 84 missing nuclear devices and their apparent capability of killing 100,000 people each. Furthermore, one witness who corroborated Lebed's claims was the former chairman of the Interagency Commission on Environmental Security for the Russian National Security Council, Alexei Yablokov, who had served as "a former environmental advisor" to Russian president Boris Yeltsin, and was highly regarded by his peers in the Russian Academy of Sciences at the time.

Yablokov himself gave a television interview to Russian television channel NTV shortly after Lebed, and also drafted a letter to Novaya Gazeta affirming both the existence of suitcase-sized nuclear weapons and the possibility that some may in fact have gone missing. "I have spoken to the people who made these bombs, so I know that they exist," Yablokov stated. "He announced that 700 such devices, which he called "nuclear mines," had existed in the Soviet Union." He also clarified that these devices had existed as far back as the 1970s. In these communications, Yablokov claimed to have met with many of the researchers who had a hand in developing suitcase-sized nuclear weapons. Moreover, his primary rebuttal against Moscow's denial was that these devices were never listed on any inventory to begin with due to their highly sensitive nature, particularly as a result of their supposed use by the KGB, with targets ranging from the United States to various NATO countries in eastern Europe. Therefore, the confirmation of these weapons' existence in addition to the security and inventory of these weapons would ultimately produce misleading results. However, "Yablokov's assertion contradicts all available information about the chain of custody of nuclear weapons, which were supposedly the sole responsibility of the 12th GUMO. In addition, it should be possible to check MOD records against logs of production facilities, and then any "unaccounted" devices would be revealed."

During the hearing itself, Yablokov would also maintain his position that KGB nuclear weapon caches continued to exist independently of the recently defunct Soviet Ministry of Defense, providing further insight into why the Russian government's denials conflicted with the claims of Lebed and Yablokov. Yablokov also clarified his source of information, which up until this point had remained ambiguous, citing communications between scientists working at the Krasnoyarsk-26, Tomsk-7, Chelyabinsk-65, and Penza-19 nuclear installations located in Russia. Yablokov also explained that if these weapons were developed in the 1970s, then the warheads would need to have been replaced at least twice by that point owing to degradation of materials, although he could not guarantee that this had occurred, and "[w]ithout detailed knowledge of the design of Soviet warheads, it would be impossible to know which components needed replacement at what time intervals."

Unfortunately, "[t]he difficulty of assessing the situation stems, first and foremost, from the fact that many, if not all, participants to the 1997–98 scandal could have had ulterior motives. At that time, Lebed was running for the governor of Krasnoyarsk Krai, with an option of running for President again in 2000. Yablokov, a perennial fighter against Minatom, was ... prepared to support anything that would help his cause; from a technical point of view, his testimony is particularly questionable". On the other hand, "Russian MOD and Minatom officials could be expected to deny anything, regardless of whether allegations were completely or even partially correct. ... In the end, not a single source can be considered entirely reliable." However, it is notable that statements made by MOD and Minatom representatives "were worded very carefully and denied the existence of "nuclear suitcases," but not necessarily the existence of other small nuclear devices." Nuclear mines "are a well-known class of nuclear weapons", while "the existence of smaller devices custom-designed for Special Forces, probably analogous to American small atomic demolition munitions (SADMs), should not be ruled out either ... with a caveat that their existence cannot be viewed as an established fact." Although, "there are sufficient grounds to believe that the Soviet Union had one or more types of portable nuclear devices", reports of large numbers of these devices having been stolen or gone missing "were most probably not true", and were likely "generated by incomplete information or ulterior motives."

Stanislav Lunev, the highest-ranking GRU officer to defect to the United States, has claimed that such Russian-made devices exist and described them in more detail. The devices, "identified as RA-115s (or RA-115-01s for submersible weapons)" weigh from fifty to sixty pounds. They can last for many years if wired to an electric source. In case there is a loss of power, there is a battery backup. If the battery runs low, the weapon has a transmitter that sends a coded message either by satellite or directly to a GRU post at a Russian embassy or consulate. According to Lunev, the number of "missing" nuclear devices (as found by General Lebed) "is almost identical to the number of strategic targets upon which those bombs would be used." However, according to Igor Valynkin, head of the 12th Chief Directorate of the Ministry of Defense, RA-115 "represented a "production index" (i.e., the type of munitions) and that the whole type had already been eliminated." Valynkin further stated that although "the production of suitcase sized nuclear weapons is theoretically possible", it would be a "very expensive and ineffective undertaking" because they would only have a short life span and would require frequent maintenance."

Lunev suggested that suitcase-sized nuclear weapons might already have been deployed by GRU operatives working on US soil to assassinate US leaders in the event of war. He alleged that arms caches were hidden by the KGB in many countries, and were booby-trapped with "Lightning" explosive devices. One such cache, identified by Vasili Mitrokhin, exploded when Swiss authorities sprayed it with a high pressure water gun in a wooded area near Bern. Several other caches were removed successfully. Lunev said that he had personally looked for hiding places for weapons caches in the Shenandoah Valley area and claimed that "it is surprisingly easy to smuggle nuclear weapons into the US", either across the Mexican border or using a small transport missile that can land undetected when launched from a Russian airplane. US Congressman Curt Weldon supported the claims made by Lunev, but noted that Lunev had also "exaggerated things" according to the FBI. Searches of the areas identified by Lunev have been conducted, "but law-enforcement officials have never found such weapons caches, with or without portable nuclear weapons."

The existence of such weapons — and their potential usefulness, yield and lethality after a prolonged number of years — remains controversial. "Even assuming that some portable nuclear devices were lost, it would be very difficult to use them ... at least not in the fashion that they were originally designed for."

== United States ==
The lightest nuclear warhead ever acknowledged to have been manufactured by the U.S. is the W54, which was used in both the Davy Crockett 120 mm recoilless rifle-launched warhead and the backpack-carried version called the Mk-54 SADM (Special Atomic Demolition Munition). The bare warhead package was an 11 by 16 inches (280 by 410 mm) cylinder that weighed 51 pounds (23 kg).

The W48 nuclear shell is 155 millimetres (6.1 in) in diameter and 846 millimetres (33.3 in) long and weighs 53.5 kilograms (118 lb). It represents the smallest diameter complete, self-contained physics package to be fielded and had a yield of 72 tonnes of TNT (300 GJ). Nuclear weapons designer Ted Taylor has alleged that a 105 millimetres (4.1 in) diameter shell with a mass of 19 kilograms (42 lb) is theoretically possible.

Former Under-Secretary of Defense for Intelligence Michael G. Vickers has claimed that he, along with other Green Berets special forces troops, practiced infiltrating Warsaw Pact countries with backpack-sized nuclear weapons, with a mission to "detonate a portable nuclear bomb." These were known as Green Light teams.

In 1994, the United States Congress passed the National Defense Authorization Act for Fiscal Year 1994, preventing the government from developing nuclear weapons with a yield of less than 5 kilotons, thereby making the official development of these weapons in the US unlawful. This law was repealed in the National Defense Authorization Act for Fiscal Year 2004.

== Israel ==
Allegations were made in the 1990s that Israel had developed suitcase nuclear bombs during the 1970s.

== See also ==
- AIM-26 Falcon
- Dirty bomb
- Neutron bomb
- The Fourth Protocol, a 1984 novel about smuggling a suitcase bomb to UK
- W25 (nuclear warhead)
- W33 (nuclear warhead)
