= Oleg Lyalin =

Soviet agent who defected from the KGB

Oleg Adolfovich Lyalin (Russian: Олег Адольфович Лялин; 24 June 1937 – 12 February 1995) was a Soviet agent who defected from the KGB. His defection led to the expulsion of 105 Soviet officials suspected as being Soviet spies from Britain on 25 September 1971.

Lyalin was sent by the KGB to London in the 1960s, posing as an official with the Soviet Trade Delegation.

His defection came about after he was arrested in London by policeman Charles Shearer for drunk driving in the early morning of 31 August 1971. He was put in jail immediately as he refused to cooperate with police and lacked diplomatic immunity. His bail of £50 was paid by the Soviet Trade Delegation but he was taken to a safe house by MI5 and his drunk driving-case was eventually dropped as he decided to defect. He offered to disclose information about KGB activities in exchange for a new life with his (Russian) secretary, Irina Teplyakova, with whom he had begun an affair and took political asylum in August 1972. Lyalin later revealed that his mission was to spy across the Midlands while posing as a textile buyer, and that there was a plan to infiltrate agents disguised as official messengers into Whitehall's tunnel systems to distribute poison gas capsules. He also confirmed the existence of a section known as Department V (formerly 13) of the KGB First Main Directorate, specialising in terrorist operations, including assassinations.

The expulsion of 105 officials was the single biggest action taken against the Soviet Union by any western government. Alec Douglas-Home, foreign secretary at the time, was accused by the Labour opposition of over-reaction.

Lyalin was given a new identity by MI5 and married Teplyakova. He remained in hiding in northern England until his death on 12 February 1995 after a long illness.

Valeriy Vladimirovich Kostikov, a second secretary who had previously interacted with Lee Harvey Oswald as a consular officer, unexpectedly departed his post in Mexico at the same time of Lyalin's defection. It is speculated that Kostikov's departure, which was not to take place until three to four months later, was a result of his being "known to Lyalin."

== See also ==
- List of Eastern Bloc defectors
- List of KGB defectors
