= Gilmore Commission =

U.S. congressional advisory panel on 2000s counterterrorism policy

Gilmore Commission is the informal and commonly used name for the U.S. Congressional Advisory Panel to Assess Domestic Response Capabilities for Terrorism Involving Weapons of Mass Destruction.

The Secretary of Defense, in consultation with the Attorney General, the Secretary of Energy, the Secretary of Health and Human Services, and the director of the Federal Emergency Management Agency entered into a contract with the RAND National Defense Research Institute (NDRI), a federally funded research and development center (FFRDC), to establish the advisory panel. The advisory panel assessed the capabilities for responding to terrorist incidents in the U.S. involving weapons of mass destruction. Response capabilities at the Federal, State, and local levels were examined, with a particular emphasis on the latter two.

Chaired by former Virginia Governor Jim Gilmore, this congressionally mandated commission functioned from 1999 to 2003. Five reports were presented to Presidents Bill Clinton and George W. Bush, John Bolton, the entire United States Congress each December 15 from 1999 – 2003. Of the Gilmore Commission's 164 recommendations, 146 have been adopted in whole or in part by Congress and the federal government.

Bolton was instrumental in derailing a 2001 biological weapons conference in Geneva convened to endorse a UN proposal to enforce the 1972 Biological Weapons Convention. He argued that the plan would have jeopardized U.S. national security by allowing spot inspections of suspected U.S. weapons sites. Bolton supported the report fully. This report played an instrumental role in founding the Domestic Nuclear Detection office and the Department of Homeland Security. The reports can be found at www.rand.org.
