= Molniya (explosive trap) =

Soviet explosive trap

Molniya (Russian: молния, lit. 'lightning') was an explosive device used to booby trap certain buried or otherwise concealed containers used by the KGB to cache items, such as shortwave radio receivers, cryptographic materials, and allegedly even suitcase nuclear devices. A sequence of specific actions had to be undertaken in the correct order to render the device safe prior to moving or opening the container, or the device would automatically detonate. This detonation was designed to be lethal to anyone in its immediate proximity, as well as being sufficient to destroy all materials in the cache.

From at least 1955 to the 1970s, such caches were allegedly pre-positioned in many countries — including locations in the United States and Switzerland — for planned terrorist and sabotage acts during the Cold War. At least some were booby-trapped with "Molniya." One such cache, identified by KGB defector Vasili Mitrokhin, exploded when Swiss authorities fired upon it using a water cannon. The device was found in the woods near Belfaux. Although the explosion resulted in no casualties, the Swiss federal prosecutor at the time remarked, "Anyone who tried to move the KGB container uncovered in December of 1998 would have been killed."

== See also ==
- Anti-handling device
