= Ali Budesh =

Indian mobster

- Born: Ali Budesh; 1957; Karachi, Sindh, Pakistan
- Died: April 14, 2022 (aged 64–65); Karachi, Sindh, Pakistan
- Cause of death: Shot dead in Karachi
- Occupation: Gang leader
- Years active: 2000s–2013
- Organization: People's Aman Committee
- Known for: Founder and leader of the People’s Amn Committee (PAC)
- Criminal charges: Murder, extortion, kidnapping and related offences
- Criminal status: Deceased

Ali Baba Budesh (1957 – 14 April 2022) was an Indian criminal and extortionist who became active in the 1990s and was based in Bahrain. He left Mumbai in the late 1980s, reportedly to avoid action by the Mumbai Police, and subsequently established a base of operations in Manama. He later died while in a coma due to complications associated with diabetes.

== Early life ==
Most of the details of Budesh's early life and background are unclear. Born to an Indian mother and Arab father, he made his entrance into the Mumbai underworld as a petty pickpocket and a street ruffian. The police in Vikhroli, a north-eastern suburb of the city, had registered a case of assault against him. However, prior to his involvement in petty crime, Budesh is known to have studied at a boarding school near Pune.

== Death ==
Ali Budesh died on 14 April 2022. His death was widely reported after Amber Sharma, investigative filmmaker and founder of Mowgli Productions, broke the news. He had been admitted to Bahrain Defence Force Hospital on 12 March 2022 suffering from high sugar levels and went into a coma.

== Contact with Dawood Ibrahim ==
While living in the slums near the Pankheshah Baba shrine at Ghatkopar, Budesh came into contact with some of Dawood Ibrahim's gang members who were on the run from the police, and sought shelter in the labyrinthine slums of the Vikhroli Parksite area. Budeshi was rewarded for his initial assistance of these men, when he was sent to Dubai and met Dawood Ibrahim, the infamous head of the D-Company and India's most wanted fugitive.

== Boss of his own gang ==
Budesh later split from the D-Company, together with other key aides of Dawood Ibrahim such as the Pakistani smuggler Shoaib Khan, Irfan Goga, and Ijaz Pathan, and formed his own separate gang with its headquarters in Bahrain. He allied himself with some of Dawood Ibrahim's enemies and went on to lead them against him. These are feared gangster from Vasai-Virar, Subhash Singh Thakur, who is currently lodged in New Delhi's Tihar Central Prison. Another former Ibrahim aide, Dilawar Khan, became Budesh's right-hand man. This alliance caused some major upsets to Ibrahim's declining empire.

== Informant ==
He also began informing on members of the D-Company to law enforcement. The detention of Dawood Ibrahim's brother, Anees Ibrahim at the Bahrain International Airport at Muharraq in 1996 is believed to have been due to a tip-off from Budesh. Dawood spent over Rs 5 lakh for his brother's release. Similarly, the month-long incarceration of Abu Salem, another key underworld figure at the UAE's Al-Rafa detention centre was attributed to Budesh. Budesh also began informing on other Indian NRI gangsters such as Chhota Shakeel, Noora Ibrahim, etc., forcing them to flee the UAE for Pakistan, where they are believed to have made their base of operations in Karachi.

== Involvement in the extortion rackets ==
In spite of the falling out with his former mentor, Budesh's policy in his extortion rackets closely follow Dawood Ibrahim's modus operandi. His targets include builders, diamond merchants and figures within the Bollywood film industry. His demands from builders include an annual fee or a few flats in their projects. From diamond merchants, he seeks deposits in numbered accounts in Swiss banks. However, the biggest contributors to his extortion racket have always been the Bollywood film figures.

Those who usually refuse to pay the extortion money or hafta as it is called in the Mumbai underworld jargon, are dealt with in a severe manner. For instance, when Natwarlal Desai, a local Mumbai based builder refused to pay the hafta being demanded by Budesh's gang, he was later shot dead on 18 August 1997 at Nariman Point by the Budesh gang members. Those businessmen who were reluctant to pay the hafta to Budesh's enforcers, paid up with alacrity after the Desai killing. After this incident, no other killing by the Budesh gang was reported for a long time.

In April 1998, Keith Rodrigues, the chief steward at the Copper Chimney restaurant at Saki Naka was shot dead by Ali Budesh's gunmen. The murder was done as a warning to the restaurant's owner, Satish Bansal, who had been dodging Budesh's demand for Rs 5 lakh for months.

== Extorting Bollywood ==
Some leading Bollywood film producers also became victims of Budesh's extortion tactics. He made threatening calls to Rakesh Roshan, Mukesh Bhatt and Boney Kapoor, and demanded up to 2 khokha (Rs. 2 crore) from each of them. The Tips Cassette Company owner, Ramesh Taurani, was also being extorted for the same amount.

On 21 January 2000, Rakesh Roshan was shot at by two Budesh gang members near his office on Tilak Road at Santacruz, Mumbai. The assailants fired two bullets at him, one of which hit him on the left arm while the other grazed his chest. As the director fell to the ground, the assailants fled the scene. The assailants were later identified as Sunil Vithal Gaikwad and Sachin Kamble. The attack on Roshan was not undertaken with the intent to kill, but to signal that the Shiv Sena could no longer protect its clients. Roshan had stonewalled demands from Budesh for a percentage of the profits from the overseas sale of the Hindi blockbuster, Kaho Naa... Pyaar Hai.

== Extorting politicians ==
In 2018, several high-ranking Indian politicians claimed to have received extortion calls from Budesh.

== Clashes with the law ==
Budesh claimed responsibility for the hand-grenade attack near a hotel in Dahisar, a western suburb of Mumbai in June 1998. In the incident, some gangsters, when challenged, hurled the grenade at the police. In the blast and the subsequent police firing, two policemen and three gangsters were killed and several others were injured. However, Budesh's claim was dismissed by the Mumbai police. The following year, Tirupati Kotian and Austin Carvalho, two members of the Ali Budesh gang were shot dead in an encounter with the Mumbai police at Kandivali.

== Open war with Dawood Ibrahim ==
Budesh had a great falling out with Dawood over a property deal in Mumbai in 1997. Budesh, along with Uttar Pradesh don Subhash Singh Thakur, had hoped to extort money out of this deal from Natwar Lal Desai, a well known builder. However, Desai who had links with the D-Company, refused to pay them any cash and asked Dawood to intervene. This resulted in a verbal spat between the two dons. Dawood threatened Budesh on phone asking the latter to stay away from Desai, to which the latter did not respond well. According to the excerpts from a tape sent by Budesh to India Today in March 2010, he stated:

I told him (Dawood) that he had no right to abuse me. I told him that so far he had known me as Ali Bhai, but the day I become Ali Budesh, you will cry!

In retaliation, Budesh and Thakur had Desai killed on 18 August 1997. In March 2010, Budesh declared an open war against his former mentor, Dawood Ibrahim and his D-company, vowing to kill the former. Budesh had teamed up with underworld don Babloo Srivastava and launched Operation D against Dawood and his gang. The duo are now being seen as the most deadly threat that the D-company has ever faced, bigger than even Dawood's arch-rival, Chhota Rajan. They are in fact accused by the Nepalese and Indian authorities of being behind the murders of Dawood's three main agents in Nepal, i.e., Majid Manihar, Parvez Tanda and Jamim Shah, Nepalese media entrepreneur who was reputed to be the architect of Dawood's counterfeit currency racket in India. Dawood is believed to have entrusted his chief lieutenant, Chhota Shakeel to deal with Budesh.

== See also ==
- Chhota Rajan
- Organised crime in India
