= Bambai Meri Jaan =

Indian period crime thriller TV series (2023)

- Genre: Crime thriller
- Created by: Rensil D'Silva; Shujaat Saudagar
- Based on: Dongri to Dubai: Six Decades of the Mumbai Mafia
- Written by: Dialogues: Abbas Dalal; Hussain Dalal
- Screenplay by: Rensil D' Silva; Sameer Arora
- Story by: S. Hussain Zaidi
- Directed by: Shujaat Saudagar
- Starring: Kay Kay Menon; Avinash Tiwary; Kritika Kamra; Nivedita Bhattacharya; Amyra Dastur
- Country of origin: India
- Original language: Hindi
- No. of seasons: 1
- No. of episodes: 10

Production
- Producers: Ritesh Sidhwani; Kassim Jagmagia; Farhan Akhtar
- Cinematography: John Schmidt
- Editor: Tushar Parekh
- Running time: 30–50 minutes
- Production company: Excel Entertainment

Original release
- Network: Amazon Prime Video
- Release: 14 September 2023

Bambai Meri Jaan (transl. Bombay My Beloved) is an Indian Hindi-language period crime thriller television series produced under the banner of Excel Entertainment. The series stars Kay Kay Menon, Avinash Tiwary, Kritika Kamra, Nivedita Bhattacharya, and Amyra Dastur. It premiered on Amazon Prime Video.

== Plot ==
In 1964 Bombay, Ismail Kadri, an honest police officer from Ratnagiri and a devout Muslim and family man, is tasked with exposing the criminal nexus between the gangsters: Suleiman "Haji" Maqbool, Azeem Pathaan, and Anna Rajan Mudaliar. Ismail’s honesty is challenged constantly both personally and professionally. The trio of the aforementioned criminals rule Bombay in the 1960s and early 70s. At home, Ismail tries to discipline his second son, Dara, and faces a crisis that puts his integrity and livelihood at stake. While coming close to exposing contraband being transported by Haji's driver, Sultan, and Ismail's brother-in-law, Rahim, Ismail's fellow police officer and best friend, Ahmed, is brutally killed by Rahim. Ismail not knowing about this, leaves him at the railway station to escape from Haji and his men. He is seen by two constables helping Rahim and is reported to his seniors. He is eventually fired by the police force. As Ismail struggles to make ends meet for his family, the financial strain starts to influence Dara’s worldview.

When Ismail is pushed to the breaking point, Haji tightens his grip and forces Ismail to support him in his illegal activities. Twelve years later, in 1977, the Prime Minister imposes a state of emergency and the Bombay Police arrests the criminal trio, only to be released later on. At the same time, Dara and his company, now around 20 years old, emerges as a skillful and wise street ruffian who provokes the might of the Pathans, first extorting money from the various shopkeepers in their territory, and then burning the akhada, igniting a bloody face-off. Haji convinces Ismail to bring Dara to the trio in order to convey an apology; Ismail gets surprised when Haji actually offers Dara to work with their gang. Now, Dara and his gang, including his two brothers, Sadiq and Ajju, start working for the Pathaans, much to the dismay of Bilawal and Azeem Pathaan. During one of the nights, Haji shows his confidence in Dara and advises him to play cool if he wants to rule the city one day.

On a brutal wedding night, Dara's childhood friend, Nasir, is gravely injured by Azeem Pathaan's nephews, Irfan and Yasir. Nasir's wife, Nasreen, is brutally raped and killed, with Nasir being forced to watch. He passes away in the hospital the next day in front of his and Dara's family. A traumatized Dara seeks revenge and ignites a deadly turf war against Haji and the Pathaans by slaying many of Pathaan's men and both his nephews. Haji chides Pathaan and the rest of the gang for the murders and brings Dara and his family in to take an oath by placing their hands on the Quran, promising to do business together by giving Dara a 25% stake in his contraband. Very soon, Dara recognizes an opportunity to move up in the business thanks to a newly forged alliance with two leading Dubai Sheikhs, marking the birth of D-Company. The newly formed outfit innovates new ideas of smuggling gold via the Bombay Airport and succeeds. Finally, Dara starts to live a lavish lifestyle, attending parties in Dubai and investing money in various construction projects with the Sheikhs.

As Dara's empire expand, family tensions rise and a revengeful Pathaan plans to bring him down. D-Company comes under attack; Dara suffers a deadly personal blow when Sadiq and his lover are gunned and killed by Ganya Surve, who was hired by the Pathaans. With tensions escalating between the two gangs, Haji confirms with Dara that he was not behind Sadiq's death, although he gives him names of the real perpetrators. The body counts rise and the stakes rise higher. Dara enlists a fearless hitman, Chhota Babban, who eventually enters the Bombay Sessions Court and shoots Raiszada while he is in custody, creating a chaotic situation.

Dara ruthlessly pushes on to decimate Pathaan and Anna in an end-game; Anna is killed on his own turf. Pathaan is also killed by Dara's gang in a hotel room after the former undertook an unsuccessful attack on Dara's family in a hospital. An all-out gang war ensues in Bombay and the state government imposes a curfew in the city as the police too cross fired on the gangsters. To escape arrest, Dara decides to leave to Dubai, but not before encountering Haji on the way, who tells him that he has indeed become Bambai ka Baadshah. Dara tries to get his family to go with him, but Ismail remains stubborn and steadfast, opting to remain in Bombay till he dies. He leaves his family behind under the care of his younger sister, Habiba, who later arranges for the killing of the last surviving Pathaan, Haroon, in Gujarat.

== Cast ==
- Kay Kay Menon as Ismail Kadri, Dara's father (based on Ibrahim Kaskar)
- Avinash Tiwary as Dara Kadri, Ismail's son (based on Dawood Ibrahim)
  - Manthan Darji as Young Dara
- Kritika Kamra as Habiba Kadri (based on Haseena Parkar)
- Nivedita Bhattacharya as Sakina Kadri (based on Amina Bi Kaskar), Ismail's wife
- Mohammed Khaliq as Maulavi Sahab
- Ashwani Kumar as Nasir Edenwala, Dara’s best friend (based on Iqbal Natiq)
  - Pratyaksh Mishra as Young Nasir
- Tauqeer Alam Khan as Ahmed Ansari, Ismail's colleague and friend
- Prince Kanwal as Arvind Kaul IAS
- Alok Pandel as Rahim
- Aayushi Lahiri as Nasreen, Nasir's wife
- Karmveer Choudhary as Home Minister
- Amyra Dastur as Pari Patel, Dara's love interest (based on Sujata Kaur)
- Saurabh Sachdeva as Suleiman "Haji" Maqbool (based on Haji Mastan)
  - Syed Muddasar Ali as Young Haji
- Nawab Shah as Azeem Pathaan (based on Karim Lala; also inspired from Samad Khan, nephew of Karim Lala)
- Saksham Shukla as Hamid, Bilawal's nephew
- Dinesh Prabhakar as Anna Rajan Mudaliar (based on Varadarajan Mudaliar)
- Jitin Gulati as Sadiq Kadri (based on Shabir Ibrahim)
- Divyani Gandhi as Kainaaz Kadri, Sadiq's wife
- Vivan Bhathena as Abdullah (based on Khalid Pehelwan)
- Shiv Panditt as Inspector Ranbir Malik (potentially based on Isaque Bagwan)
- Kannar Arunachalam as Commissioner Kamath (based on D. S. Soman)
- Kundan Roy as Inspector Dutta
- Sumeet Vyas as Ganya Surve (based on Manya Surve)
- Hemant Choudhary as Nasir’s father
- Lakshya Kochhar as Ajju Kadri, Dara and Sadiq's younger brother (based on Anees Ibrahim)
  - Atharva Sharma as Young Ajju
- Aditya Rawal as Chota Babban (based on Chhota Rajan)
- Sunil Palwal as Bilawal (based on Bashu Dada)
- Jai Singh Rajput as Sultan
- Tanaya Khan Jha as Chitra
- Kamaljeet Rana as Haroon

== Production ==
=== Cast ===
Initially Angira Dhar were approached to play the female lead. Later Kritika Kamra and Amyra Dastur along with Kay Kay Menon, Avinash Tiwary and Nivedita Bhattacharya joined the cast.

=== Development ===
In August 2023, the series was announced by Excel Entertainment, consisting of ten episodes for Amazon Prime Video. It is based on S. Hussain Zaidi's Dongri to Dubai: Six Decades of the Mumbai Mafia (2021). Initially titled "Dongri To Dubai", later changed and launched with the title "Bambai Meri Jaan". The principal photography of the series commenced during the COVID-19 pandemic.

== Reception ==
Reema Chhabda of OTT Play rated the series 2.5/5 stars. Deepa Gahlot of Rediff.com rated the series 3/5 stars. Zinia Bandyopadhyay of India Today gave the series 3.5/5 stars.

The series was reviewed by Firstpost, The Indian Express, The Telegraph, and The Hindu.

== See also ==
- List of Amazon India originals
- List of Amazon Prime Video original programming
