= Haseena Parkar =

2017 film directed by Apoorva Lakhia

- Theatrical release poster
- Directed by: Apoorva Lakhia
- Written by: Suresh Nair
- Dialogues by: Chintan Gandhi
- Produced by: Nahid Khan
- Starring: Shraddha Kapoor; Siddhanth Kapoor; Ankur Bhatia; Priyanka Setia; Rajesh Tailang
- Cinematography: Fasahat Khan
- Edited by: Steven H. Bernard
- Music by: Songs: Sachin–Jigar; Score: Amar Mohile
- Production company: Swiss Entertainment
- Distributed by: AA Films
- Release date: 22 September 2017 (India)
- Running time: 124 minutes
- Country: India
- Language: Hindi
- Budget: ₹18 crore
- Box office: est. ₹9 crore

Haseena Parkar (previously titled Haseena: The Queen Of Mumbai) is a 2017 Indian Hindi-language biographical crime film directed by Apoorva Lakhia and produced by Nahid Khan. The film is based on Dawood Ibrahim's sister Haseena Parkar, who is portrayed by Shraddha Kapoor. Siddhanth Kapoor, Ankur Bhatia, Priyanka Setia, and Rajesh Tailang play supporting roles. The film was released on 22 September 2017 and received mixed reviews from critics, becoming a box-office bomb.

== Plot ==
The film opens on 22 May 2007, at the Sessions Court of Mumbai. A large crowd of media and civilians has gathered outside. Five taxis carrying a burqa-clad woman each arrive at the court. Khalid, the trusted right-hand man of Haseena Parkar, escorts them to the courtroom. The judge asks Haseena to come to the stand and confirm her identity. Subsequently, all the women lift their veils and reveal themselves. Here, the hearing begins.

Haseena Parkar (Shraddha Kapoor) lives with her close to a dozen siblings in a small house in central Mumbai. She is shown to be particularly close to one of her brothers, Dawood Ibrahim (Siddhanth Kapoor), who turns to crime growing up.

Haseena marries the kindhearted Ibrahim Parkar (Ankur Bhatia) and finds herself compelled to bear the brunt of her brother's criminal actions. As her brother rises in the underworld scene, his enemies also increase manifold. One of the enemies eliminates Ibrahim Parkar as revenge. On the other hand, the 1993 Bombay bombings send shock waves everywhere. Dawood emerges as one of the key conspirators in this ghastly crime. As he escapes to Dubai, once again it is Haseena who is in trouble.

Haseena realises that she can no longer be a victim. She hits back and emerges as Aapa (elder sister) in Mumbai's male-dominated underworld. Haseena faces 88 cases of extortion in which she is named as part of her brother's infamous D-Company. She maintains her innocence and relates the story of how she was merely a nervous new bride who was forced to turn into the Godmother of Nagpada. As Advocate Shyam Keswani and Public Prosecutor Roshni Satam (Priyanka Setia) continue to argue the case, the judge grows sympathetic towards the life and story of Haseena Parkar.

== Cast ==
- Shraddha Kapoor as Haseena Parkar
- Ankur Bhatia as Ibrahim Parkar, Haseena's husband
- Siddhanth Kapoor as Dawood Ibrahim
- Priyanka Setia as Public Prosecutor Roshni Satam
- Rajesh Tailang as Advocate Shyam Keswani
- Rakesh Bidua as Magistrate Jagdish Vora
- Navdeep Tomar as Khalid
- Tauqeer Alam Khan as Ameerzada Pathan
- Vikram Chadha as Samad Pathan
- Dadhi Pandey as Ibrahim Kaskar
- Aparna Ghoshal as Amina Kaskar
- Sunil Upadhyay as Shabir Ibrahim Kaskar
- Ayan Khan as Iqbal Kaskar
- Daya Shankar Pandey as Inspector Amol Salunkhe
- Samar Jai Singh as Inspector Ranbir Likha
- Paras Priyadarshan as Danish Parkar
- Surabhi Badgaiyan as Haseena's sister
- Harish Khatri as Haseena's father-in-law
- Swara Bharat as Haseena's mother-in-law
- Neela Pathak as Faitam
- Charanpreet Singh as David Pardesi
- Ashmita as Khushiyaan
- Muskan Bamne as Burkha Girl Umaira in court
- Sarah Anjuli as dancer in the item number "Piya Aa"

== Production ==
=== Development ===
Apoorva Lakhia had initially planned to make a biopic on Dawood Ibrahim, a topic that was taken already by several directors. Hence, he visited the family of Dawood's sister Haseena, and also met Haseena herself. He was fascinated with her life story and decided to make a biopic on her.

Sonakshi Sinha was first offered to play Haseena, however she opted out due to scheduling conflicts. In October 2016, Shraddha Kapoor was cast to play the titular role. Shraddha's brother Siddhanth Kapoor and Ankur Bhatia were cast to play Dawood Ibrahim and Ibrahim Parkar, Haseena's husband respectively.

=== Filming ===
Principal photography began in October 2016.

== Release ==
The official teaser was released on 14 June 2017. The trailer of the film was launched on 18 July 2017.

The film was scheduled to release on 14 July 2017. It was then delayed to 18 August 2017. On 9 August 2017, the makers finalized the release date as 22 September 2017.

== Reception ==
=== Box office ===
As of 6 October 2017, the film had collected est. ₹2.65 crore (US$280,000). It grossed a total of ₹9.06 crore (US$940,000) during its theatrical run against its budget of ₹18 crore (US$1.9 million) and was declared a "disaster".

=== Critical reception ===
Bollywood Hungama gave 2 out of 5 stars writing "On the whole, HASEENA PARKAR fails to impress as it's too superficial and unexciting. At the box office, the limited buzz and competition from other releases will prove detrimental". Renuka Vyavahare of The Times of India gave the film 2 out of 5 stars, stating, "The crime drama fails to offer an insight into Haseena's life". Syed Firdaus Ashraf from Rediff.com gave 2 out of 5 stars, writing, "Shraddha Kapoor tries hard to rescue the film. Shraddha Kapoor deglamorizes herself to get into the character and her sincerity as an actress reflects throughout the movie. It has all the ingredients to make it a blockbuster". Saibal Chatterjee of NDTV gave 1.5 out of 5 stars, and wrote "The film is a dreary courtroom drama in which the protagonist is hauled before the law to defend herself". Filmfare gave 2 out of 5 stars, and wrote "Haseena Parkar could have been a real thriller had it been serious about telling serious story. But it tries to add too much masala and style to story and serves up absolutely no substance. As a result, the only female who made a presence in Mumbai's fabled underworld is reduced to being a stylised character with fancy dialogue but no real meaning".

== Soundtrack ==
Haseena Parkar
Review scores
Source	Rating
News18 India	3/5 stars
Musicaloud	3/5 stars
Bollywood Hungama	1.5/5 stars

Haseena Parkar

Soundtrack album by Sachin–Jigar
- Released: 8 September 2017
- Genre: Feature film Soundtrack
- Length: 14:00
- Language: Hindi
- Label: Saregama

Sachin–Jigar chronology
Simran (2017)	Haseena Parkar (2017)	Bhoomi (2017)

The music of the film was composed by Sachin–Jigar with lyrics written by Priya Saraiya, Vayu, and Kirthi Shetty.

The soundtrack was released on 8 September 2017 by Saregama. The first song of the film, "Tere Bina", sung by Arijit Singh and Priya Saraiya, was released on 29 August 2017. Audio and lyrical versions of the song were released on 7 September 2017 and 10 September 2017 respectively. The second song, "Bantai", was launched on 8 September 2017 and its lyrical version was released on 14 September 2017. The third song, "Piya Aa" was launched on 15 September 2017. Its audio and lyrical version was released on 19 September 2017 and 29 September 2017 respectively.

All music is composed by Sachin–Jigar.

Track listing
No.	Title	Lyrics	Singer(s)	Length
1.	"Tere Bina" (Romantic Version)	Priya Saraiya	Arijit Singh, Priya Saraiya	5:10
2.	"Bantai"	Kirthi Shetty	Divine	3:33
3.	"Piya Aa"	Vayu	Sunidhi Chauhan	3:03
4.	"Tere Bina" (Sad Version)	Priya Saraiya	Priya Saraiya	2:14
Total length:				14:00
