= Bird Education Society for Travel & Tourism =

- Company type: Private
- Founded: January 21, 1998
- Founder: Vijay Bhatia, Radha Bhatia, Ankur Bhatia, Gaurav Bhatia
- Headquarters: New Delhi, India, New Delhi, Mumbai, Gurgaon, Chandigarh
- Area served: India
- Key people: Radha Bhatia (Chairperson); Dr.S Chandra (Chief Mentor); Ankur Bhatia (Executive Director); Pradeep Maharesh (CEO)
- Website: www.birdacademy.in

Bird Education Society for Travel & Tourism is an academy based in New Delhi with campuses in Chandigarh and Mumbai.

The institute offers both Full-time and Part-time courses in the field of Aviation, Travel and Tourism, Information Technology and Hospitality Management involving Soft skills Training, IATA Consultant and Foundation Course, Airport Handling and Dangerous Goods Regulation.

The Academy is an Authorised International Air Transport Association Training Centre in India.

University of Delhi has also launched Certificate Courses in Travel and Tourism. Miranda House conducts various Tourism courses in collaboration with the Academy.

== Awards and accolades ==
- Ranked amongst South Asia's 2012 Top 10 Authorised Training Centers by IATA.
- 'Certificate of Recognition' from IATA for its high graduate success rate in 2009.
- Ranked South Asia's 2011 Top 10 IATA Premier Circle - Certified Authorized Training Centers.
