= S. Hussain Zaidi =

Indian writer (born 1968)

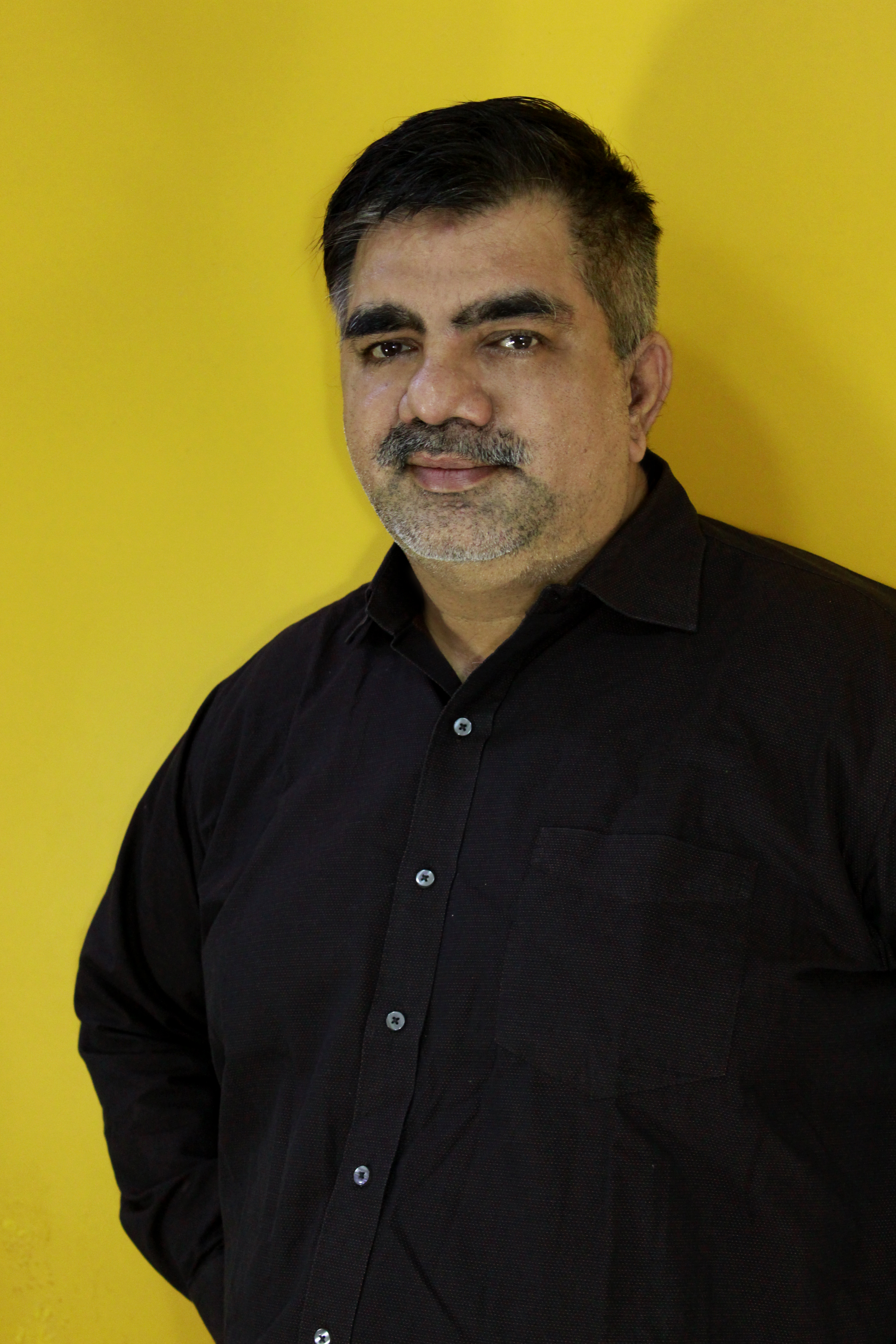
- Born: Syed Hussain Zaidi; 28 February 1968 (age 58); Mumbai, Maharashtra, India
- Occupations: Novelist, journalist, Movie Producer
- Spouse: Velly Thevar
- Writing career
- Genres: Nonfiction, fiction, crime, mafia, investigation, documentary
- Notable works: Black Friday; Dongri to Dubai: Six Decades of the Mumbai Mafia; Mumbai Avengers

Syed Hussain Zaidi (born 28 February 1968) is an Indian author and former investigative journalist. His works include Dongri to Dubai: Six Decades of the Mumbai Mafia, Mafia Queens of Mumbai, Black Friday, My Name is Abu Salem and Mumbai Avengers.

S. Hussain Zaidi is a prolific writer. He publishes under the Blue Salt imprint. The Mumbai mafia has been his focus in books such as Dongri to Dubai: Six Decades of the Mumbai Mafia, Mafia Queens of Mumbai, My Name is Abu Salem and Byculla to Bangkok.

== Career ==
Zaidi began his career in journalism while working for the newspaper The Asian Age, where he became the resident editor. Zaidi later worked for several other periodicals, including The Indian Express, Mid-Day and Mumbai Mirror. His in-depth research on the Mumbai mafia has been used by international authors, including Misha Glenny in McMafia and Vikram Chandra in his book Sacred Games. Zaidi was once kidnapped in Iraq.

Zaidi has covered the Mumbai mafia for several decades. His 2002 book Black Friday detailed the 1993 Mumbai bombings, an attack consisting of thirteen explosions that killed 250 people. The book was adapted two years later, in 2004, into a film by Anurag Kashyap also titled Black Friday. Subsequent to a petition by a group of accused perpetrators of the bombings, the Bombay High Court stayed the release of the film until a verdict was reached in the case. It was finally released on 9 February 2007 after the Supreme Court of India allowed it following the TADA court verdict in the '93 Bombay blast case.

In Dongri to Dubai: Six Decades of the Mumbai Mafia, a historical account of the Mumbai mafia, Zaidi conducted an interview with crime boss Dawood Ibrahim, who is suspected of having orchestrated the bombings. The book was adapted into the film Shootout at Wadala by Sanjay Gupta.

Zaidi was an associate producer of the HBO documentary Terror in Mumbai, which is based on the 26/11 attacks.

Zaidi interviewed former Indian spy Lucky Bisht in June 2022. Bisht was accused of murder of civilians, for which he was jailed, but was later acquitted due to insufficient evidence.

Zaidi's book R.A.W. Hitman: The Real Story of Agent Lima about the assassination of Raju Pargai and Amit Arya, is partially based on his interview with Bisht.

== Filmography ==
The 2015 Kabir Khan film Phantom, starring Saif Ali Khan and Katrina Kaif, is an adaptation of Zaidi's book Mumbai Avengers; the screenplay was written in conjunction with the author.

Farhan Akhtar and Ritesh Sidhwani of Excel Entertainment produced the web series Bambai Meri Jaan, an adaptation of Zaidi's book. The series focuses on Dawood Ibrahim's early life and the Mumbai underworld.

Shah Rukh Khan's production house Red Chillies Entertainment released the Netflix film Class of '83, starring Bobby Deol and directed by Atul Sabharwal, based on Zaidi's book of the same name.

Gangubai Kathiawadi is a Hindi-language biographical crime film directed by Sanjay Leela Bhansali and produced by Bhansali Productions in conjunction with Jayantilal Gada's Pen India Ltd. The film is based on Zaidi's book Mafia Queens of Mumbai.

London Confidential: The Chinese Conspiracy is a Hindi-language spy thriller film streaming on ZEE5 since September 2020. Written by Zaidi and directed by Kanwal Sethi, it stars Mouni Roy and Purab Kohli.

Zaidi mentored journalist Jigna Vora. The filming rights to her memoir Behind Bars in Byculla: My Days in Prison were acquired by Matchbox Pictures.

Year	Title	Notes
2004	Black Friday	Based on Zaidi’s book on the 1993 Bombay bombings
2013	Shootout at Wadala	Inspired by events documented in Zaidi’s works
2015	Phantom	Based on Mumbai Avengers
2020	Class of '83	Based on the book of the same name
2020	London Confidential: The Chinese Conspiracy	Written by Zaidi
2021	Lahore Confidential	Part of the Confidential film series
2021	Dongri to Dubai	Web series adaptation
2022	Gangubai Kathiawadi	Based on Mafia Queens of Mumbai
2023	Mumbai Mafia: Police vs Underworld	Netflix documentary
2023	Scoop	TV series based on Jigna Vora’s memoir
2023	Bambai Meri Jaan	Crime drama web series
2024	Indian Police Force	TV series
2026	O'Romeo	Based on Mafia Queens of Mumbai, also story writer

== Publications ==
- Black Friday: The True Story of the Bombay Bomb Blast (2002)
- Mafia Queens of Mumbai: Women who Ruled the Ganglands (2011)
- Dongri to Dubai: Six Decades of the Mumbai Mafia (2012)
- Headley and I (2012)
- Byculla to Bangkok (2014)
- My Name Is Abu Salem (2014)
- Mumbai Avengers (2015)
- Dangerous Minds (2017)
- The Wily Old Woman of Dongri (2017)
- Eleventh Hour (2018)
- Dawood's Mentor (2019)
- The Class of 83: The Punishers of Mumbai Police (2019)
- The Endgame (2020)
- Zero Day (2022)
- R.A.W. Hitman: The Real Story of Agent Lima (2023)
- The Black Orphan (2024)
- The Dangerous Dozen: Hitmen of the Mumbai Underworld (2024)
- R.A.W. Hitman 2: The Assassinations (2024)
- From Dubai to Karachi (2024)
- Mafia Queens of India (2025)
