= Dongri to Dubai: Six Decades of the Mumbai Mafia =

Non-fiction book by Hussain Zaidi

Dongri To Dubai
- Cover art of the Book
- Author: Hussain Zaidi
- Language: English
- Published: Roli Books
- Publication place: India
- Media type: Print (Paperback)
- Pages: 408 (paperback)
- ISBN: 978-8174368942
- Followed by: Byculla to Bangkok

Dongri to Dubai: Six Decades of the Mumbai Mafia is a book by former investigative journalist Hussain Zaidi published in 2012. The book traces the evolution of the Mumbai mafia from a group of thugs and smugglers to the present day mafia dons of organised crime. It traces the journey of Dawood Ibrahim from the by-lanes of Dongri where he first cut his teeth in crime, to Dubai, where he eventually established his empire.

The book was adapted into the film Shootout at Wadala by Sanjay Gupta. A TV adaptation is currently in the works. Bambai Meri Jaan is a web series based on this book.

== Plot ==
The book chronicles the story of notorious Mumbai gangsters like Haji Mastan, Karim Lala, Chhota Rajan, Abu Salem, and primarily Dawood Ibrahim from 1947 to 2011.

Dawood Ibrahim was initiated into crime as a pawn in the hands of the Mumbai police and went on to wipe out the competition and eventually became the Mumbai police's own enemy. The narrative encompasses several milestones in the history of crime in India, from the rise of the Pathans, formation of the Dawood gang, the first ever supari, mafia's nefarious role in Bollywood, Dawood's move to Karachi, and Pakistan's subsequent alleged role in sheltering one of the most wanted persons in the world.

The book is about how a boy from Dongri became a don in Dubai. It covers his ambition and rise to power, and describes the Mumbai mafia's rivalries for supremacy and its internal conflicts.

The narrative begins from the period of the 1950s when the eras of smugglers like Haji Mastan and Varadarajan Mudaliar flourished. Then it moves to tell stories of the menace of the Pathan gang, the short but deadly span of Manya Surve and the rise and fall of Maya Dolas whose location was tipped by Dawood Ibrahim himself in order to cut the hands reaching towards him eventually all the events leading to the making of the don - Dawood Ibrahim. It's a story of how a young boy from the streets of Dongri, a police man's own son becomes a fugitive from law to hide in Dubai and never to return to his homeland. All the events mentioned in the book leads to the 1993 Mumbai Blasts which were blamed on Dawood. It explains why Dawood was not entirely the mastermind and how due to political manipulation he went on to be called a 'deshdrohi'.
