= Anees Ibrahim =

Indian criminal

- Born: Anees Ibrahim Kaskar
- Citizenship: Indian
- Occupations: Gangster and drug dealer
- Organization: D-Company
- Relatives: Shabir Ibrahim Kaskar (brother) (deceased); Dawood Ibrahim Kaskar (brother); Iqbal Ibrahim Kaskar (brother); Haseena Parkar (sister) (deceased)
- Criminal charges: Organised crime, drug trafficking, extortion, targeted killing
- Wanted by: India
- Wanted since: 1980s

Anees Ibrahim Kaskar is a Mumbai based Indian gangster, criminal mobster and drug dealer. He is wanted by the Mumbai police in connection with more than 24 cases of murder, extortion and drug smuggling.

== Personal life ==
Anees Ibrahim is the son of a former Criminal Investigation Department's havaldar, Ibrahim Kaskar. He is the brother of Dawood Ibrahim.

== See also ==
- 1993 Bombay bombings
- Organised crime in India
