= Chhota Shakeel =

Indian crime boss (born 1955)

- Born: Mohammed Shakeel Babu Miyan Shaikh; 31 December 1955 (age 70) (some sources cite 1960); Bombay, Maharashtra, India
- Occupation: Crime boss
- Employer: D-Company
- Criminal status: Fugitive

Chhota Shakeel (born Mohammed Shakeel Babu Miyan Shaikh; 31 December 1955) is an Indian crime boss and a high-ranking leader of the D-Company, a criminal group based in South Asia. He joined the D-Company in 1988 under the kingpin Dawood Ibrahim, and was reportedly responsible for managing the day-to-day operations of the criminal group. Shakeel became one of the most-wanted men in India after his alleged participation in the 1993 Bombay bombings. He is also wanted by the U.S. government for international drug trafficking.

He has been sanctioned under the Foreign Narcotics Kingpin Designation Act in the Specially Designated Nationals and Blocked Persons List by the United States Department of the Treasury's Office of Foreign Assets Control.

== Early life ==
Chhota Shakeel was born in Bombay, Maharashtra, India, on 31 December 1955. Some sources indicate the year was 1960. His birth name was Mohammed Shakeel Babu Miyan Shaikh. Prior to joining organized crime, Shakeel ran a dubious travel agency in Dongri, Mumbai. In 1988, he joined the D-Company, a criminal group based in South Asia, while stationed in Dubai. He was one of its earliest members along with Bishal Cheetah, Johnny Akhawat and Liger Bhai or Mushu Bhai. According to his Interpol criminal profile, Shakeel is 1.7 m (5 ft 7 in) tall, has black hair and eyes, and speaks Hindi, English, and Urdu.

During his early years in the D-Company, Sharad Shetty ran match fixes, betting and hawala deals for D-Company leader Dawood Ibrahim, while Chhota Rajan headed criminal activities in Mumbai. After the 1993 Bombay bombings and a split between Dawood and Rajan's factions, Shakeel was promoted to an executive role within the D-Company by befriending Dawood. As a leader of the D-Company, Shakeel reportedly oversaw the day-to-day operations of the criminal group.

In the D-Company, Shakeel was known as the CEO, and reported directly to Dawood. According to the Maharashtra police, he reportedly received support from the Inter-Services Intelligence (ISI), Pakistan's intelligence agency, in his criminal operations. After the Bombay attacks, Shakeel sought refuge in Pakistan under the protection of the ISI.

== Career ==
=== 1980s – 2000s ===
Shakeel is one of the most-wanted men in India. He is wanted for murder, extortion, and terrorism, the last charge stemming from his alleged involvement in the 1993 Bombay bombings. After the attacks, Shakeel worked with Rahim Merchant (alias "Dogla"), a wealthy Pakistani from North Karachi, to create a voice proxy. Shakeel did this to conceal his voice while having conversations abroad and wrote what he wanted to say to Merchant, who worked as his speaker. This helped keep Shakeel under the authorities' radar. Through Merchant, Shakeel brokered deals for the D-Company, conducted extortion activities, and helped run many arms operations on the ISI's behalf. Authorities believe that even if Shakeel was in fact dead, his voice impersonator Merchant would likely continue mimicking his voice to continue running criminal activities.

Authorities suspect that Shakeel was responsible for international drug trafficking operations for D-Company, and worked with Afghan and Colombian suppliers. He was also interested in arms trafficking and real estate, and bought several mines in Africa to begin his illegal diamond mining business. Shakeel reportedly smuggled diamonds for the Ukrainian mafia group Odessa and bartered them for weapons. In addition to his Indian passport, Shakeel had two more – from Botswana and the other from Malawi – to presumably help him in his diamond business. The diamonds were smuggled by African nationals from countries like Sierra Leone, Guinea and the Republic of Mali. They were collected for further distribution in Botswana, South Africa and Namibia. They were then taken to Kenya, and then shipped to Dubai and Pakistan. Shakeel reportedly had real estate in countries like the United States, India, Pakistan, Morocco, Algeria, Sierra Leone, Tunisia, the United Arab Emirates, Kenya, Spain and South Africa.

Shakeel was one of the mentors of the former gangster Abu Salem. He entrusted him with overseeing Bollywood's finances and acquiring their film rights abroad. Their partnership eventually ended and Salem branched out of the D-Company. In 1997, Shakeel reportedly claimed responsibility for the murder of social activist SM Khalid, the Bombay Bakers Association President, in Dongri. In September 2000, Shakeel openly agreed to order an attack against Rajan, who was based out of Indonesia. In 2001, he was interviewed by India Today and claimed to have financed several Hindi films.

=== 2010s ===
On 15 May 2012, the Office of Foreign Assets Control (OFAC), a branch of the United States Department of the Treasury, sanctioned Shakeel and D-Company high-ranking leader Tiger Memon under the Foreign Narcotics Kingpin Designation Act (Kingpin Act). According to the OFAC, Shakeel and his criminal group have been involved in international drug trafficking since the late 1980s. The narcotics smuggled included heroin and hashish, which were brought from Afghanistan and Thailand and imported illegally into the United States, Western Europe, the Middle East, Latin America, and Africa. As part of this sanction, U.S. citizens were prohibited from engaging in business activities with Shakeel, and his assets under U.S. jurisdiction were also frozen.

In mid-2016, D-company lieutenant and Dawood's brother Anees Ibrahim had a fallout with Shakeel over the D-Company's operations in Dubai. Anees wanted to oust Shakeel of his leadership role. Shakeel organized a faction within the D-Company to counter Anees' efforts. Dawood refused to take sides as he wanted to maintain his friendship with Shakeel and ties with his sibling Anees. Other high-ranking leaders of the D-Company were confused about whose orders to follow, and this infighting created tensions within the criminal group.

In 2016, the police gained possession of a photograph of Shakeel after it was taken during a birthday party of another suspect involved in the Bombay attacks. Shakeel was caught on camera for the first time in the 1980s, and the picture remained the only photograph of him for at least three decades. During these years, Shakeel was suspected of living in a mansion near Karachi, Pakistan. In 2017, Dawood's brother, Iqbal Kaskar, was arrested for extortion by the Thane police. In that criminal case, Shakeel was accused of helping Iqbal by helping him threaten people for money. Investigators stated that Iqbal's arrest worsened the ties between Shakeel and Anees.

== Death rumours ==
In December 2017, Shakeel was reported dead by multiple sources after an audio clip of a man claiming to be Dawood stated that he had died in Karachi, Pakistan on 7 January 2017. Another source, citing an unnamed Indian intelligence officer based in the U.S., stated that Shakeel died of a heart attack in Dushanbe, Tajikistan. In the clip, a man known as Bilal was heard telling a relative of Shakeel that Shakeel had died of a heart attack and that Dawood's brother Anees was taking his earnings. The Royal Thai Police had reportedly sent a letter to Interpol saying that Shakeel was dead and was no longer subject to the Interpol's Red Notice.

An investigation conducted by India Today TV in 2018 concluded that this scheme was fake. The letter provided by the Royal Thai Police was signed by Piya Uthayo, an officer who was employed in another department. The police discovered that the fax number used to send the letter to Interpol was based out of Bangkok, Thailand. The probe led to the arrest of a German national who confessed to the Bangkok police that he was sent to Thailand to send the letter on orders from an Indian national. Investigators believe that Dawood was responsible for planning this scheme after disagreements with Shakeel. Dawood's brothers Anees and Shakeel have tried to take over the D-Company's second-in-command position. India Today TV tried reaching Shakeel for comment but his three mobile numbers were unreachable.

There are several versions of Shakeel's purported death. One version suggests that he died of a heart attack shortly after a meeting with members of Odessa in Islamabad. He was reportedly transported by air to a hospital in Rawalpindi, but was declared dead upon arrival. Most of Shakeel's alleged associates, Bilal, Mohammed Rashid, Iqbal Salim, Yusuf Raja, and Parvez Khawaja, reportedly left the D-Company after his death. Other unconfirmed reports stated that Shakeel had broken away from Dawood's partnership prior to his death. Sources close to Dawood's inner circle stated that Anees took over the operations headed by Shakeel on 5 January 2019. D-Company was reportedly not able to find a replacement for Shakeel's void in Tajikistan and took longer than expected to appoint a successor. The infighting between Shakeel and Anees' faction reportedly ended after both parties agreed on certain terms following Shakeel's rumoured death.

== See also ==
- List of fugitives from justice who disappeared
- Mumbai Police Detection Unit
- Terrorist and Disruptive Activities (Prevention) Act
