= Miss Guyana Universe 2009 =

- Date: July 4, 2009
- Presenters: Wanita Huburn; Stan Gouviea
- Entertainment: Adesia Lambert, Gordon Marsh, Jessica Xavier, Aspara Dancers, Wayne Marshall
- Venue: National Cultural Center, Georgetown, Guyana
- Director: Derek Moore
- Entrants: 15
- Winner: Jenel Cox
- Congeniality: Cianna Persaud
- Photogenic: Lucria Rambalak
- People’s Choice Awards: Lucria Rambalak
- Miss Body Beautiful: Janella Lewis

Miss Guyana Universe 2009 was held at National Cultural Center, Georgetown on 4 July 2009.

Jenel Cox was crowned Miss Guyana Universe 2009. She beat 14 other contestants to take the title.

Jenel Cox represented Guyana in the Miss Universe 2009 at Atlantis Paradise Island, in Nassau, Bahamas on 23 August 2009.

== Schedule of Events ==
- June 28 : Swimsuit competition at Castellani House
- July 2 : Question & Answer Segment, Live on NCN
- July 4 : Pageant Final

== Results ==
Final results	Contestants
Miss Guyana Universe 2009	Jenel Cox
1st Runner-up	Rachael Bakker
2nd Runner-up	Lucria Rambalak
3rd Runner-up	Janella Lewis
4th Runner-up	Nandani Seecharan

=== Special awards ===
Award	Name
Miss Photogenic	Lucria Rambalak
People's Choice Awards	Lucria Rambalak
Miss Body Beautiful	Janella Lewis
Miss Congeniality	Cianna Persaud

== Contestants ==
Contestant	Age	Height(ft)
Rachel Bakker	22	5 ft 7 in (1.70 m)
Jenel Cox	19	5 ft 8 in (1.73 m)
Melissa Hendrax	19	5 ft 7 in (1.70 m)
Candace Horatio	24	5 ft 8 in (1.73 m)
Althia King	19	5 ft 5 in (1.65 m)
Janella Lewis	20	5 ft 9 in (1.75 m)
Lotoya Maraj	19	5 ft 10 in (1.78 m)
Asanti Mickle	21	5 ft 8 in (1.73 m)
Faye Nicholson	19	5 ft 7 in (1.70 m)
Cianna Persaud	23	5 ft 5 in (1.65 m)
Lucria Rambalak	22	5 ft 5 in (1.65 m)
Ornella Ramcharan	19	5 ft 8 in (1.73 m)
Nandani Seecharan	26	5 ft 7 in (1.70 m)
Divya Sieudarsan	20	5 ft 5 in (1.65 m)
Shivon Siewdyal	21	5 ft 9 in (1.75 m)

== Crossovers ==
Contestants who previously competed at other beauty pageants:

- Jenel Cox, Miss Guyana Universe, was previously Miss Guyana Talented Teen 2006 and 2nd runner-up at Guyana's Next Top Model. She had competed at Miss Universe 2009 in Nassau, The Bahamas but unplaced.
- Lucria Rambalak, 2nd runner-up of Miss Guyana Universe, has finished 2nd runner-up at Miss Guyana India Worldwide 2009. She was appointed as Guyana's delegate to the Miss India Worldwide 2010 in Durban, South Africa.
- Janella Lewis, 3rd runner-up of Miss Guyana Universe, had completed at Miss Caribbean World 2008 in the British Virgin Islands.
- Ornella Ramcharan had completed at Miss Guyana India Worldwide 2011 but unplaced.
- Divya Sieudarsan has finished 2nd runner-up at Miss Guyana India Worldwide 2011. She was crowned Miss Guyana India Worldwide 2014 in Georgetown. She represented Guyana at Miss India Worldwide 2014 in Abu Dhabi, United Arab Emirates.
