= Human Cocaine =

2026 Indian crime film directed by Sarim Momin

- Theatrical release poster
- Directed by: Sarim Momin
- Written by: Sarim Momin
- Produced by: Chee Teng Joo; Harit Desai
- Starring: Pushkar Jog; Ishita Raj; Siddhanth Kapoor; Zakir Hussain
- Cinematography: Sopan Purandare
- Edited by: Sandeep Francis
- Music by: Kshitij Tarey
- Production companies: Scarlet Slate Studios; Vinelight; Textstep Services; Goosebumps Entertainment
- Release date: 30 January 2026
- Running time: 107 minutes
- Country: India
- Language: Hindi

Human Cocaine is a 2026 Indian Hindi-language action crime thriller film written and directed by Sarim Momin and produced by Chee Teng Joo and Harit Desai. The film stars Pushkar Jog, Ishita Raj, Siddhanth Kapoor and Zakir Hussain. The film was released theatrically on 30 January 2026.

== Plot ==
The film revolves around the rise of a new variant of cocaine which is manufactured through a disturbing process. The film exposes the underworld that forces audiences to confront uncomfortable realities.

== Cast ==
- Pushkar Jog as Arjun
- Ishita Raj as Liza
- Siddhanth Kapoor as Baby
- Zakir Hussain as Dino
- Suhani Gandhi as Priyanka
- Ainy Jaffry as Josh

== Marketing ==
The first look posters of the film was released on 27 October 2025. The Trailer was released on 22 December 2025.

== Release ==
The film is scheduled for a theatrical release on 16 January 2026, but it has been postponed and released on 30 January 2026.

== Reception ==
Archika Khurana of The Times of India gave 2.5 stars out of 5 and said that "Sarim Momin’s film is a watchable thriller that thrives on atmosphere and performance but falters in writing and narrative cohesion."

Film Information's review was also very mixed.
