= Suhani Gandhi =

British actor-model

- Born: Bedford, United Kingdom
- Education: University of Birmingham; Imperial College London
- Occupations: Actress, entrepreneur
- Height: 5 ft 7 in (1.70 m)
- Beauty pageant titleholder
- Title: Miss India UK 2014; Miss India Europe UK 2014
- Years active: 2014–present
- Hair color: Black
- Eye color: Brown
- Major competitions: Miss India UK 2014 (Winner); Miss India Europe UK 2014 (Winner); Miss India Europe 2014 (2nd Runner-up); Miss India Worldwide 2014 (Top 5)

Suhani Gandhi is a British actress, and beauty pageant titleholder of Indian descent.

She was crowned Miss India UK in January 2014, and had finished as 2nd runner-up at Miss India Europe 2014. She placed in the top 5 at Miss India Worldwide 2014.

== Early life and education ==
Suhani was born and brought up in Bedford, England. Her parents, Mukul Gandhi and Asmita Gandhi, are both Chartered Accountants. Suhani completed her schooling at Bedford Modern School and graduated with a law degree from the University of Birmingham and a Masters from Imperial College London.

== Career ==
Although naturally inclined towards her studies, Suhani modelled as a child and young teenager in the UK. She trained part-time for five years at LAMDA (London Academy of Music Drama and Arts), receiving a distinction in the gold medal for acting. Thereafter, she undertook theatre workshops and performed in theatre productions in England and Mumbai. Suhani was nominated by Times Now for the NRI of the Year Award.

She starred in a film based in Rajasthan as the protagonist, in which she received the Best Debut Award at the Rajasthan Cine Awards and Best Actress at the Rajasthan Film Festival. The film is based on women empowerment and education which released on 21 November 2014.

She has starred in various TV Commercials, including Margo, Dubai Tourism, Tanishq, Vivo, Xolo, Ease My Trip, Britannia, Heineken. She has acted in Aparichit which was selected as the Top 5 short films in the Best of India Film Festivals in LA and made it to the Oscars Longlist. Her short film Seasons, won 4 awards at the 7th Darbhanga International Film Festival. Suhani was also seen in Jab Harry Met Sejal, Arjun Patiala and the television film Love.

Suhani is starring as 'Adilah Farhani' in the Portuguese series Fernao Lopes premiering in 2021 on RTP1 and Netflix where she has been paired opposite Diogo Morgado. In 2022, she acted in her first Gujarati film titled Dayro, directed by Dhwani Gautam

== Filmography ==
| Year | Title | Role | Notes |
|---|---|---|---|
| 2014 | Mhaari Supatar Beendani | Rupali | Winner, Best Actress Rajasthan Cine Awards. Winner, Best Debut Actress Rajasthan Film Festival |
| 2017 | Jab Harry Met Sejal | Sunaina | Red Chillies Entertainment |
| 2018 | Arjun Patiala | Tia | Maddock Films |
| 2018 | Seasons | Nalini | Short Film |
| 2018 | Aparichit | Shaina | Short Film (Longlisted for Oscars) |
| 2019 | Pyaar Tune Kya Kiya | Natalie | TV series, Essel Vision Productions |
| 2019 | Love | Neha | ZEE5 |
| 2020 | Fernao Lopes | Adilah | RTP1 Netflix |
| 2021 | On the Seesaw | Amruta | Disney Hotstar |
| 2022 | Dayro | Cherry | Shemaroo |
| 2026 | Human Cocaine | Priyanka | Lead role |
| TBA | Badtameez Gill | Rumi | |

Awards and achievements
| Preceded by Nehal Bhogaita | Miss India UK; 2014 | Succeeded by Nandini Patel |
