= Byculla to Bangkok =

2014 nonfiction book by S. Hussain Zaidi

- Cover art of the Book
- Author: Hussain Zaidi
- Cover artist: Mohsin Rizvi
- Language: English
- Genre: Non-fiction; Organized crime; Terror
- Published: HarperCollins
- Publication place: India
- Media type: Print (paperback)
- Pages: 304 (paperback)
- ISBN: 9789351362258
- Preceded by: Dongri to Dubai

Byculla to Bangkok is the second non-fiction book on organised crime and terror in the modern-day Indian metropolitan city of Mumbai written by S. Hussain Zaidi. It was first published by HarperCollins in February 2014. The book is a sequel to Dongri to Dubai. Hussain completed the story that was left unfinished in his earlier book by including the story of the "local lads" of the infamous mobster Dawood Ibrahim. The book deals primarily with three of the mobsters of Mumbai: Chota Rajan, Arun Gawli and Ashwin Naik. The film adaptation is owned by Ram Gopal Varma and Red Chillies Entertainment.

== Storyline ==
Byculla to Bangkok is largely a story about Mumbai's gangsters. The book focuses on how young people were recruited and then they later went on to become mobsters of the city. Major characters in this book include are Arun Gawli, wheelchair user Ashwin Naik who was also a civil engineer of the city and an accomplished gangster, and Chhota Rajan. Chotta Rajan was earlier the deputy of Dawood, but later became his foe. The book is written with reference to police case files. Mumbai police's top officials like Vijay Salaskar, Pradeep Sharma and their squads, who are dubbed "encounter specialists", are also mentioned in the book. The writing style is racy.

== Critical reviews ==
Critics argued that the prequel to the book, Dongri to Dubai, was better in terms of story. The review by Mumbai Boss said:

The difference is Zaidi’s sensational style of writing that’s more suited to a cheap potboiler. The book has more clichés than a magazine of bullets. For example, "The night always seems eerier in the wilderness than in the city. Especially if death is in the air" and "Men would kill to possess her. But it seemed that those who made love to her were destined for certain death." And yet it somehow matches the personalities Zaidi profiles.

MPositive described it as "alternately spine-chilling and moving".
