= Margarita (Indian TV series) =

1997 Indian television series

Margarita is an Indian television show broadcast on Zee TV in 1997, starring Milind Soman, Rajeshwari Sachdev, Nivedita Bhattacharya, Malvika Singh, Vinay Pathak, Nadira, and Kalpana Iyer.

Margarita is a love story, set in Goa against a Portuguese backdrop. It tells the story of Pedro who is in love with Margarita, also called Tita, the youngest of the family's three children. However, a family tradition that the youngest daughter remains unmarried to take care of her aged parents prevents the two from marrying. So, Soman marries one of the other sisters to be close to his loved one.

This show was ahead of its time. The show begins in a TV studio where Suchitra Pillai narrates the story of Margarita, her grandmother from her diary kept and maintained by Margarita throughout her life.

The music has been scored by Louis Banks and the costumes designed by Wendell Rodriques.

== Cast ==
Character	Played By	Additional Notes
Margarita Braganza	Rajeshwari Sachdev	Lead Female Character of the story. The youngest daughter of Elena Braganza, commonly nicknamed as 'Tita'.
Pedro D'Costa	Milind Soman	He married Margarita's elder sister, Rose Braganza.
Rose Braganza	Nivedita Bhattacharya	Eldest daughter of Elena Braganza
Donna Elena Braganza	Kalpana Iyer	Commonly referred to as Elena, Elena Mai, or simply Mai.
Gertrude (Braganza)	Malvika Singh	Second daughter of Elena Braganza born out of wedlock from Elena with her lover Joseph. Joseph and Elena were in love with each other. However, Elena's parents were opposed and forced Elena to marry Juan Braganza. Joseph and Elena kept loving each other even after Elena's marriage to Juan. Joseph and Elena were supposed to run away together while Elena was pregnant with Gertrude however, Elena's father shot Joseph thinking he was an armed robber. Elena kept her silence and continued to live a married life with Juan, keeping Joseph in her heart. Tita came across the love letters (after Elena Mai's demise) in a box that Elena Mai had kept hidden.
Nacha	Nadira	The housemaid who raised Margarita since her birth
Chancha	Tuhina Vohra	The house help of Braganza house
Drago	Vicky Ahuja	House help of the Braganza family. He and Chancha loved each other. Later he married Chancha and they have a daughter named Kancha.
Dr. John Coelho	Vinay Pathak	Family doctor and friend, who loved and eventually married Margarita
Josephita	Suchitra Pillai	Rose and Pedro's daughter. Margarita's mother.
Josephita's daughter, Margarita	Suchitra Pillai	The narrator of the story and granddaughter of Margarita is a role duplicate resembling her mother Josephita, played by Suchitra Pillai. She is also named Margarita, after the lead female character.
Donna Pikita	Kamini Khanna	Childhood friend of Elena Braganza
Kancha	Geeta Tyagi	Daughter of Chancha, next-generation house-help to Braganza family.
Alex Coelho (child)	Not known	Child actor - son of Dr. John Coelho
Roberto	Not known	Infant actor - first child and son of Rose and Pedro. The day Rose's water broke, Chancha and Elena Mai had to leave the house in the early morning for a family emergency. Only Pedro and Tita were in the house. Tita coaxed Pedro to go on his bicycle and find the doctor for Rose's delivery. Tita did not know what to do. Suddenly, Nacha's soul appears to Tita. She helps deliver, Roberto - Rose's son with Tita's help. Rose was not able to feed Roberto after he was born. Tita once helped Roberto by trying to feed him her breast milk. To her surprise, Roberto was feeding only from Tita. Tita looked after Roberto like her own son. Roberto would find peace and solace in Tita's company. Elena Mai ordered Rose and Pedro to temporarily live in Pedro's home. Tita was unhappy with the decision since she knew Roberto couldn't accept anyone for feeding. Roberto did not survive the separation from Tita, who fed her and took great care of her. Tita held Elena Mai responsible for Roberto's death.
Alex Coelho (adult)	Atul Kumar	He is the son of Dr. John Coelho. When he was a boy, he thought he would marry little Josephita. Years after moving away from the town, the Coelho family i.e. Dr. John, his son Alex and Margarita returned to the town. This is the next generation segment of the show when the actors grew older and the children became adolescents including Alex and Josephita. Alex falls in love with Josephita unknowingly and they get married in church with theconsent of everyone in both of their families. They marry exactly one year after the death of Alex's father, Dr. John Coelho.

== Plot ==
=== Margarita's birth ===
Josephita's daughter reading out an entry from Margarita's personal diary in a cozy TV studio with small TV sets around her as she speaks live in the studio.

Flashback into the story: Nacha, the housemaid, and Elena Mai who is pregnant are cooking in the kitchen and chatting with each other when suddenly Elena's water breaks. She is in pain and worried that the child will come before they can make it to a hospital. There is no time to call a doctor or take Elena Mai to the nearest hospital. Nacha makes Elena Mai lay on the kitchen counter and delivers the baby: it's a girl. Nacha holds her in her hands proudly and looks at her with motherly love. A few days after the birth, Elena's husband dies and Elena is burdened with managing the family affairs. Nacha offers to be the foster mother for the newborn girl, who is named Margarita. Since then, Margarita is fostered and brought up under the care and love of Nacha and Margarita loves her like a mother. Margarita spends most of her life in the kitchen alongside Nacha.

It is said that chopping onions makes one cry. Margarita would never cry. Nacha had a remedy for this. She put a small onion of top of Margarita's head while she was chopping onions and Margarita immediately began to cry at.

=== Love at first sight ===
It is Christmas Eve and Donna Elena Braganza is hosting a Christmas party for family and friends. Margarita is expected to serve the guests alcoholic drink, prompting her to ask her mother, Elena Mai, when can she start drinking. Elena Mai says she is too short to drink and tells her that when she will be a few inches taller, she can drink. Once Mai leaves, Margarita looks at herself in the mirror, stands on her toes, and while whispering to herself, 'Now I am tall enough to drink some', she gulps a single shot from the tray in front of her. She sees through the mirror that there is a young man (Pedro) who is staring at her intensely.

=== The beginning of the love affair ===
Pedro cannot get Margarita out of his mind and he starts following her everywhere. Margarita is walking with chicks bundled up in her skirt when one of them falls down as she is climbing the stairs from the garden. She struggles to pick up the fallen chick as both her hands are full and as Pedro rushes to help, her skirt hikes up. Margarita realizes what is happening and while trying to quickly fix her skirt, the chicks all fall out onto Pedro. Next, Margarita is seen walking on the seashore along with Chancha, Rose, and Gertrude with Pedro following her closely. The girls giggle and smile and continue walking along the shores, while Pedro follows Margarita who is lagging behind, and asks her if she has feelings for him also. Margarita hesitates but eventually admits her feeling for him.

=== Family's old tradition ===
According to the family's old tradition, the youngest daughter cannot get married. She has to stay at home and take care of the elderly parents for the rest of their lives. Nacha, the housemaid and also Margarita's foster mother thinks that Elena Mai wouldn't be adamant to follow this absurd tradition. To her shock, Elena Mai expresses her concern and makes it clear to the entire house that according to the traditions, Tita is the youngest, and therefore she cannot marry anyone. She has to take care of her like how it has been in the family for several years. Hearing this, Nacha and Elena have a little argument over the kitchen where Nacha expresses that she thought Elena Mai would be more considerate and break such a family tradition and free her daughters to live a happily married life. Certainly, this is not the case in Braganza house.

=== Pedro's asks for Tita's hand in marriage ===
Pedro and his father, Pascal come to meet Elena Mai to ask for Margarita's hand in marriage for Pedro. Elena Mai explains the family tradition to them that Tita cannot get married according to the family's old tradition. She also states that his son-in-law to her other daughters must live with them in the Braganza house since, after her, all the property would eventually belong to him.

Pedro instead settles to marry Elena's eldest daughter, Rose. Everyone is excited in the kitchen with Chancha going back and forth getting news from the sitting hall to the kitchen. She is baffled at the thought that Pedro is agreeing to marry Rose instead of Tita. She is unable to communicate that well to the ladies in the kitchen. Finally, Elena Mai comes into the kitchen and announces that a decision has been made. The marriage will be next month, with Rose. Whilst leaving Braganza house, Pedro's father asks Pedro why he agreed to do this.

Everyone in Braganza house is shocked. Tita is quietly absorbing her tears and does not utter a word. She has immersed herself in chores. Nacha is worried about Tita. Nacha is seeing cutting onions and down came Tita's tears like rain on a deserted land.

=== Rose and Pedro's marriage ===
Tita tries on the marriage veil and accidentally red wine drops on it. The stains are hard to remove. Gertrude summons Nacha. Nacha rushes from the kitchen to solve the problem. She sprinkles some white powder on the veil and it becomes white as new again.

Nacha and Elena argue over why she consented to Rose and Pedro's marriage knowing the fact that Pedro and Tita love each other deeply. Elena says that she is the mother of their daughters and decider of their fate.

Later, Tita asks Nacha to get ready for the marriage ceremony. Nacha says she does not feel well from within, her heart is not fully happy with this marriage. She tells Tita to continue without her and asks her not to cry during the ceremony. Tita dreams of herself and Pedro getting married in the church instead of Rose. While she hallucinates back to reality, she realizes that Rose and Pedro are taking their first walk down the aisle as a married couple and bells are ringing.

Pedro finds Tita and confesses to her in one corner of the house that he has done this marriage only for the sake of him being close to Tita. He still loves Tita and will continue to love her.

The reception is held at Braganza house. Everyone is being served with the wedding cake after dinner. As each was eating those pieces of cake, everyone started to cry. Pedro and Rose ate the cake too, and cried. Gertrude, Tita's elder sister ate the cake too, Mai ate it too. All of them cried.

Elena scolds Tita that she must have definitely put something in the cake that resulted in this incident. She is pleading to Mai that she did not do anything and that she can ask Nacha herself as she was also there. They both come to see Nacha. Nacha is silent. She has died. Tita starts crying telling Nacha's body that there is no one of her own after her.

=== Post marriage Pedro and Tita's affair ===
Pedro and Tita silently exchange letters by keeping their letters in a letterbox in the sitting hall. No one knows that. This is how they exchange their romantic thoughts for each other and keep their love alive. Meanwhile, Rose and Pedro haven't consummated their marriage yet.

Pedro sees Tita working on the grinding stone in the kitchen and is wooed by her beauty.

In the bedroom, while Rose is signaling Pedro for closeness, Pedro tells Rose that she is probably tired and therefore tonight is not their night to be together. Rose is upset. The next morning while the sun is still rising, Pedro and Rose are sleeping whilst all of a sudden Pedro dreams of Tita and accidentally holds Rose's hands. Rose is elated and she feels that Pedro is getting close to her. Pedro asks for forgiveness from the Lord saying that he is doing all of this only to be together with Tita. Pedro returns to the bed and consummates his marriage with Rose.

That very day, while Tita is eagerly opening the letterbox she does not find a letter. Pedro is seen flashing the letter to Tita when all of a sudden Elena Mai comes in. She understands looking at the letter what is happening between the two of them and orders Chancha to throw the letter in the garbage bin saying there is no room for garbage in this house looking sternly at the two of them, Pedro and Tita.

Besides the letter, the only other way Pedro and Tita would talk would be by means of compliments and appreciation for the food that Tita cooks at the dining table. Each time Pedro compliments the food, Rose feels uncomfortable and Elena interjects by commenting on something inadequate in the food, sometimes salt being less, sometimes some other thing.

=== Gertrude is in love ===
Meanwhile, Gertrude and Chancha disguise themselves as men and visit a local pub. Gertrude helps herself with some drinks there and meets a soldier. She falls in love with her bravery. When she returns home late at night she is confronted by Elena Mai who is furious and angry to see her returning late, being drunk, and to top it all to be answering back to her mother. Mai locks her up in the room and tells that she will not come outside only until Mai decides and wants to. Gertrude also locks the room from inside and tells Mai that she can't come inside until she decides when to. Gertrude is a rebel.

=== Roberto - Pedro and Rose's first child ===
Rose soon gets pregnant with Pedro's first child. Tita is heartbroken. Chancha and Mai have to leave one day for a funeral. Tita, Rose, and Pedro are in the house. Tita and Pedro are in the garden. Pedro confronts Tita on why she is not speaking to him anymore and that how much he endures in the house just to be with Tita. Rose starts screaming inside the room in pain. Her water broke. Tita and Pedro hurriedly come to Rose. Tita insists Pedro take the bicycle and get Dr. Fernandes. Pedro tracks down the whereabouts of Dr. Fernandes at a funeral. However, the funeral itself is of Dr. Fernandes. There he meets Dr. John Coelho who agrees to tend to Pedro's wife's help. Pedro carries Dr. John on the passenger seat of his bicycle. Meanwhile, Rose is in pain and Tita is all alone. She cries for help. Nacha's soul appears and helps deliver the baby. Dr. John Coelho and Pedro reach only to find that Tita has delivered Rose's baby boy, Roberto. Mai and Chancha return from the funeral and are happy to receive their first grandchild. Rose has some complications posting her delivery. Dr. John offers to tend to Rose. Rose can't produce milk for Roberto. Mai and Rose are worried for Roberto since the baby cries all day and hasn't eaten or drunk anything for the first two days. Finally, Tita agrees to look after Roberto. She takes him in her room and tries to breast-feed Roberto herself. To her surprise, the baby is feeding. Pedro sees this. Tita believes it's a miracle, however, Pedro is convinced that this was bound to happen since Roberto is in a way Pedro and Tita's sign of love although Rose is her mother.

Pedro still is crazily in love with Tita. Tita befriends Dr. John and spends a good time with her in the house each day while Dr. John visits Rose for checkups. Pedro is jealous and confronts Dr. John saying that he should know that Tita cannot marry as per this house's tradition. Tita is angry at Pedro for having bust this news all of a sudden to Dr. John. Pedro is convincing Tita that he still loves her and he has done all of this to just be with her. He starts kissing her passionately while holding her in her arms. Mai sees this from the corner of the open window. She decides that it is time for Pedro, Rose, and Roberto to leave Braganza house and settle in Pedro's home. Pedro is worried that Roberto wouldn't be able to eat or drink anything without Tita around. Tita is helpless against Mai's decision.

Pedro, Rose, and Roberto leave Braganza house. A few weeks, days, or months have not passed and Elena Mai decides to send some fresh fish and other food items to Pedro's house. Drago visits Pedro's house only to learn that Roberto has died. Chancha busts the news to Mai and Tita in the kitchen. Tita is shocked, crying loudly she screams at Mai, "You killed my Roberto. You killed my Roberto!". Mai tightly slaps Tita making her nose bleed instantly. Tita continues, "You killed my Roberto" and angrily leaves the house towards the garden.

=== Margarita's shocking silence ===
After Roberto's demise, Margarita goes into a shock. She does not speak a word. Mai thinks she is going mad and therefore seeks Dr. John's help to find Margarita a decent Mental Asylum for her treatment. Dr. John is petrified at heartless Mai's words. He instead offers to help by taking Margarita in his home for a few days to which Mai agrees amicably. Margarita starts living in Dr. John's home with his son Alex. She speaks nothing for several days. According to Tita, she is trying to find herself through her silence. After a few days, she and Alex are taking a walk outside when Alex suddenly disappears. Tita thinks Alex is playing hide and seek with her and tries to find her in all places. When she cannot find Alex anywhere, her heart sinks. She feels that she will lose Alex just like she lost Roberto. She screams for Alex and finally finds him hiding in a place. This is when her silence ends. She starts living a happy life with Alex and Dr. John in their home.

=== Dacoits in Braganza house ===
Meanwhile, Drago has gone out of town to find better work to start a better life with Chancha. Chancha and Mai are alone at Braganza house. One dark evening the dacoits come hunting towards Braganza house. Chancha and Mai are alone in the house. Mai confronts the dacoits but all in vain. The dacoits attack Elena Mai and she falls off the balcony injuring herself badly. Chancha gets taken advantage of by one of the dacoits.

Few days pass by and Dr. John and Tita decide to get married. Tita intends to notify Mai of her decision as she does not feel she is obliged to stay with Elena Mai for the rest of her life anymore. She and Dr. John decide to pay a visit to Braganza house, only to find saddened faces of Chancha and Elena Mai in pain. Elena Mai hurt her back badly due to which she cannot walk anymore. She is bedridden. Chancha is depressed and in her own world. Looking at all of this, Tita decides to stay back at Braganza house to take care of Mai. Dr. John leaves. Chancha confides in Tita over the wrath of that evening and what tragedy befallen on her pride and self-esteem. Tita comforts Chancha. Elena Mai is not happy with Tita's help and she defies her every attempt for helping Mai recover with better food.

Drago comes back from town with a ring in his pocket thinking he will propose Chancha only to find Chancha's unfortunate rape news. He is heartbroken. Chancha finally agrees to marry Drago. They both hug each other.

=== Tita's engagement, Chancha's marriage ===
Few days don't pass and Mai dies. There is nothing left in Braganza house anymore. Tita finds the secluded box with love letters between Mai and his lover, Joseph. She learns the truth about Gertrude being born out of wedlock between Mai and Joseph. Rose and Pedro return to Braganza house, too. They have their daughter Josephita with them. Pedro begets a daughter with Rose after Roberto's death in order to have Rose find happiness once again in her daughter. Tita names their daughter as 'Josephita' - Probably, she coined this name knowing Mai's lover's name was Joseph too.

Dr. John officially asks for Tita's hand in marriage from Rose and Pedro, as only them being the elders of the house. Pedro is seen forcing himself on Tita on the night of their engagement after the engagement party is over.

Thereafter, a few days pass by and Chancha marries Drago in a small ceremony. At the reception, we see that Gertrude returns with her husband.

At the reception party, Tita notices Elena Mai's ghost who is troubling Tita since Tita and Pedro involved themselves in illegitimate intimacy outside of wedlock. Angrily, out of revenge, Elena's ghost attacks Pedro by transporting a flying log of firewood to him. Pedro burns his hand. Tita runs towards Pedro and takes her in her arms and starts comforting her intensely. Rose notices this and so does Dr. John. It is then that Dr. John and Rose both learn that Tita loves Pedro and this love is so intensely strong in their hearts. Rose is heartbroken.

=== Rose's depression ===
Pedro is bedridden and Tita tries to take care of him. Rose blocks Tita's actions to avoid them being together at any moment. She fears their closeness risks her marriage. Meanwhile, Gertrude learns of Tita's pregnancy and she confronts Rose and tells her the reality. Rose locks herself in a room for several days and speaks to no one. Meanwhile, Dr. John and Tita take care of Pedro.

One fine day, Rose opens the door. Chancha notices her coming out of the room, obese and ugly. Her depression led her to overeat.

Tita learns that she is no longer pregnant anymore and that it was a false alarm. She confronts Rose and tells her to express herself instead of remaining silent. Talking is better for venting out the anger. She also tells Rose that she isn't pregnant with Pedro and that whatever Gertrude told Rose that night was false. Rose couldn't care less.

Nacha appears to Tita and pleads her to detangle herself from the worries and woes of those around her and that she is not needed anymore here. She urges her to start her own life and start living. Tita leaves the Braganza house. She starts living in Dona Pikita's house. Dr. John visits Tita here and once again proposes to Tita, and she accepts.

One day while she is asleep, Pedro visits her and she touches his face, utters his name, and then dies, leaving Pedro alone.

=== Tita's marriage ===
Tita and Dr. John are getting married in the church. As they walk down the aisle as a married couple, Tita sees Rose at the church's door. She is pleasantly surprised and happy to see Rose and mentions to her that she became all well. Tita says she is so happy to see Rose back in her normal body again, rid of all obesity and beautifully smiling at her. Rose tells her that she is so happy for Tita.

Suddenly Pedro is seen arriving at the church looking for Tita. He informs Tita and Dr. John of Rose's demise. Tita is shocked and realizes that the beautiful Rose that she saw and talked to was actually Rose's soul who had come to visit Tita and congratulate her on her happy day.
