= Miss India Worldwide 2014 =

- Date: June 20, 2014
- Venue: Al Raha Beach Resort, Abu Dhabi, United Arab Emirates
- Entrants: 40
- Winner: Monica Gill; United States
- Congeniality: Yaddisha Dulangi Peterson; Sri Lanka
- Photogenic: Janine Habib; Netherlands

Miss India Worldwide 2014 was the 23rd edition of the Miss India Worldwide pageant, held on 20 June 2014. The event was held at Al Raha Beach Resort in Abu Dhabi, United Arab Emirates.

Nehal Bhogaita of the United Kingdom crowned her successor Monica Gill of United States at the end of the event.

== Results ==
Final result	Contestant
Miss India Worldwide 2014	United States - Monica Gill
1st runner-up	Switzerland - Cynferth Turrian
2nd runner-up	Bahrain - Priya D'Silva
Top 5	Spain – Angie Shamdasani; United Kingdom - Suhani Gandhi
Top 10	Grenada – Noopoor Akruwala; Netherlands – Janine Habib; India – Anugya Sharma; Oman – Niharika Pathak; United Arab Emirates – Sanna Monga

=== Special awards ===
Award	Name	Country
Miss Congeniality	Yaddisha Dulangi Peterson	Sri Lanka
Miss Photogenic	Janine Habib	Netherlands
Miss Talented	Noopoor Akruwala	Grenada
Miss Bollywood Diva	Shima Singh Mann	Sweden
Miss Beautiful Smile	Joanna Soudine-Palton	French Guiana
Miss Catwalk	Sonia Singh	Norway
Miss Beautiful Skin	Amreeta Goundar	New Zealand
Miss Beautiful Hair	Jessica Sonejee	Andorra
Miss Beautiful Face	Rachel Bianca Salema	Kuwait
Miss Beautiful Figure	Angie Shamdasani	Spain
Miss Viewer's Choice	Priya D’Silva	Bahrain
City 1016 Listener's Choice	Ritu Shah	Dominica
Miss Chairman's Professional	Harpreet Kaur	Belgium

== Contestants ==
40 contestants competed for the title of Miss India Worldwide 2014.

- Andorra – Jessica Sonejee
- Australia – Swetha Raj
- Bahrain – Priya D'Silva
- Belgium – Harpreet Kaur
- Canada – Kajol Panchal
- Denmark – Laxmi Bhandari
- Dominica – Ritu Shah
- France – Mauree Ornella
- French Guiana – Joanna Soudine-Palton
- Germany – Nieves Gautam Nagpal
- Grenada – Noopoor Akruwala
- Guadeloupe – Laurence Jiounandan
- Guyana – Divya Sieudarsan
- India – Anugya Sharma
- Indonesia – Mansi Sharma
- Italy – Revan Satinder
- Kenya – Komal Karsan Halai
- Kuwait – Rachel Bianca Salema
- Malaysia – Dhiva Sakti Yogandran
- Martinique – Coralie Couta
- Mauritius – Shyanshini Sunnassee
- Netherlands – Janine Habib
- New Zealand – Amreeta Goundar
- Norway – Sonia Singh
- Oman – Niharika Pathak
- Qatar – Trisha Verma
- Singapore – Priscilla Martin
- Sint Maarten – Kiran Jivnani
- South Africa – Gabriella Seekola
- Spain – Angie Shamdasani
- Sweden – Shima Singh Mann
- Sri Lanka – Yaddisha Dulangi Peterson
- Suriname – Darshani Khodabaks
- Switzerland – Cynferth Turrian
- Tanzania – Nida Kamaal
- Trinidad and Tobago – Shriveta Balram
- Uganda – Ruchi Vohra
- United Arab Emirates – Sanna Monga
- United Kingdom – Suhani Gandhi
- United States – Monica Gill

== Judges ==
The Miss India Worldwide 2014 final judges were:

- Harbajan Singh - Cricketeer
- Neha Dhupia - Actress and model, winner of Femina Miss India Universe 2002.
- Richa Chadda - Actress
- Nikhil Dwivedi - Actor
- Sundeep Koachar - Astrologer
- Meghana Fareed - Radio presenter
- Dharmatma Saran - Dharmatma Saran, chairman and founder of Miss India Worldwide and Mrs. India Worldwide.

=== Crossovers ===
Contestants who previously competed or will compete at other beauty pageants:

- Australia – Swetha Raj, Miss Miss India Australia, won the title of Miss India Pacific Supertalent of the World 2014 in Seoul, South Korea.
- Guyana – Divya Sieudarsan, Miss India Guyana, had completed at Miss Guyana Universe 2009. She has finished 2nd runner-up at Miss India Guyana 2011.
- Kenya – Komal Halai, Miss India Kenya, had finished 1st runner-up at Miss India UK 2014 and Miss India Europe UK 2014. She had completed at Miss India Europe 2014 and won the award of Miss Best Personality
- Malaysia – Dhiva Sakti Yogandran, Miss India Malaysia, had completed at Miss World Malaysia 2015 and won the award of Miss Photogenic.
- Singapore – Priscilla Martin, Miss Singapore India, was Miss Singapore Global Beauty Queen 2016.
- Suriname – Darshani Khodabaks, Miss India Suriname, was Miss Multiverse India 2012 and Miss Heritage Netherlands 2016.
- United Kingdom - Suhani Gandhi, Miss India UK, was previously Miss India Europe UK. She placed as the 2nd runner-up at Miss India Europe 2014.
