= Chicken Curry Law =

2019 film by Shekhar Sirrinn

- Theatrical release poster
- Directed by: Shekhar Sirrinn
- Written by: Shekhar Sirrinn
- Produced by: Shankar K. N.; Amit Kumar; Sukhdev Singh
- Starring: Natalia Janoszek; Ashutosh Rana; Nivedita Bhattacharya; Makarand Deshpande; Mukesh Hariawala
- Cinematography: Suresh Beesaveni
- Edited by: Shadab Khan
- Music by: Shekhar Sirrinn
- Production company: Seven Hillss Cine Creations
- Distributed by: Panorama Studios
- Release date: 9 August 2019
- Running time: 127 minutes
- Country: India
- Language: Hindi

Chicken Curry Law is a 2019 Indian Hindi-language legal drama film directed by Shekhar Sirrinn. The film stars Ashutosh Rana, Natalia Janoszek, Nivedita Bhattacharya and Mukesh Hariawala. It is distributed by Panorama Studios. It was theatrically released in India on 9 August 2019.

== Plot ==
A foreign belly dancer, Maya, is raped and left to die by sons (Makiya and Nana) of a Mumbai-based politician. A social activist, Satya, and a lawyer, Sitapati, leave no stone unturned to get justice for Maya. However, Satya is killed in the process, even as Sitapati continues to fight the legal battle. The court acquits the suspects. Sitapati instigates Makiya and his brother and both the brothers shoot him dead and get arrested. Maya turns into a social activist in the same NGO where Satya used to work.

== Cast ==
- Ashutosh Rana as Sitapati Shukla
- Natalia Janoszek as Maya Johnson
- Nivedita Bhattacharya Satya Deshmukh
- Makrand Deshpande as Mutthu Swamy
- Ganesh Pai as Makiya
- Zakir Hussain as Sharad Joshi
- Aman Verma as Chagan Patil

== Release ==
The film was scheduled to be released in 2018 but was postponed. It is now to be released on 9 August 2019.

The film was released theatrically on 9 August 2019.

== Soundtrack ==
Chicken Curry Law

Soundtrack album by Shekhar Sirrinn
- Released: 18 July 2019
- Recorded: 2018
- Genre: Feature film soundtrack
- Length: 21:11
- Language: Hindi
- Label: Zee Music Company
External audio
- Official Audio Jukebox on YouTube

The music of the film is composed by Shekhar Sirrinn while lyrics are written Shekhar Sirrinn, Shabbir Ahmed and Rajesh Manthan.

Track listing
No.	Title	Lyrics	Singer(s)	Length
1.	"Mera Sufi Ishq"	Shabbir Ahmed	Shalmali Kholgade	4:50
2.	"Ya Khudara Maaf Kar"	Shekhar Sirrinn	Kailash Kher	5:38
3.	"Aye Zindagi"	Shekhar Sirrinn	Shekhar Sirrinn	5:05
4.	"Isey Naam Doon Kya"	Rajesh Manthan	Jagpreet Bajwa	5:38
Total length:				21:11
