= Ishita Raj =

Indian film actress (b. 1990)

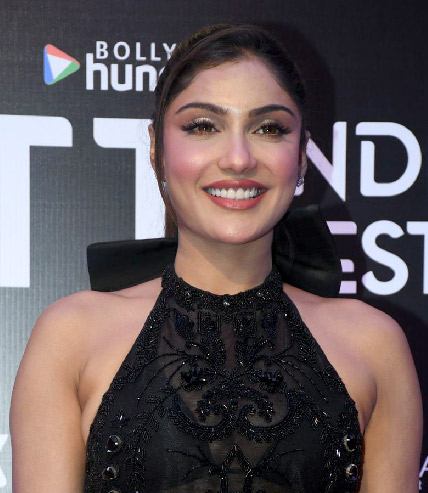
- Ishita in 2024
- Born: 11 July 1990 (age 36); Delhi, India
- Other name: Ishita
- Occupations: actor; Model
- Years active: 2011–present
- Known for: Pyaar Ka Punchnama; Pyaar Ka Punchnama 2

Ishita Raj Sharma (born 11 July 1995) is an Indian actress and model, best known for her work in Pyaar Ka Punchnama, Pyaar Ka Punchnama 2 and Sonu Ke Titu Ki Sweety.

== Career ==
Ishita acted in Pyaar Ka Punchnama (2011), produced by Wide Frame Pictures in which she played one of the three girls named Charu. The film became a sleeper hit with newcomers in the lead. It has achieved a cult status among the youth. Ishita Sharma also worked in Meeruthiya Gangsters in 2015.

Ishita was in Luv Ranjan’s Pyaar Ka Punchnama 2, in which she was paired with Omkar Kapoor. In 2018, she featured in Sonu Ke Titu Ki Sweety, which crossed more than ₹ 100 crore in India.

== Filmography ==
Year	Film	Role	Notes
2009	Kal Kisne Dekha	Bhumi	
2011	Pyaar Ka Punchnama	Charu	
2015	Meeruthiya Gangsters	Pooja	
2015	Pyaar Ka Punchnama 2	Kusum	
2018	Sonu Ke Titu Ki Sweety	Pihu	
2019	Prassthanam	Nikhat	Special appearance in song "Dil Bevda"
2019	Yaaram	Zoya	
2019	Jai Mummy Di	Young Pinky Bhalla	Special appearance
2023	Chatrapathi	Dancer	Special appearance in song "Bareilly ke Bazaar"
2024	Wild Wild Punjab	Meera	
2025	Kapkapiii	Dancer	Special appearance in song "Titli"
2026	Human Cocaine	Liza	
