= Ejaz Lakdawala =

Indian mobster

Ejaz Lakdawala is an Indian gangster from Mumbai, Maharashtra.

In May 2003, he was rumoured to have been killed when Dawood's gang-members, also known as D-Company, angered by his allegiance to Chota Rajan, opened fire at him in a crowded market in Bangkok. However, he survived and moved to Canada.

In May 2004, he was arrested by the Royal Canadian Mounted Police in Ottawa, Canada following an Interpol red corner notice for him.

In the early morning of 9 January 2020 he was arrested by Mumbai Police. His arrest comes on the heels of his daughter Sonia Lakdawala alias Sonia Shaikh's arrest a fortnight ago at Chhatrapati Shivaji Maharaj International Airport, while she was trying to fly to Nepal on a forged passport. Ejaz is involved in more than 20 cases of extortion, attempted murder and rioting.

In March 2024, he was sentenced to life imprisonment over a 1996 murder case.
