= Nivedita Bhattacharya =

Indian actress

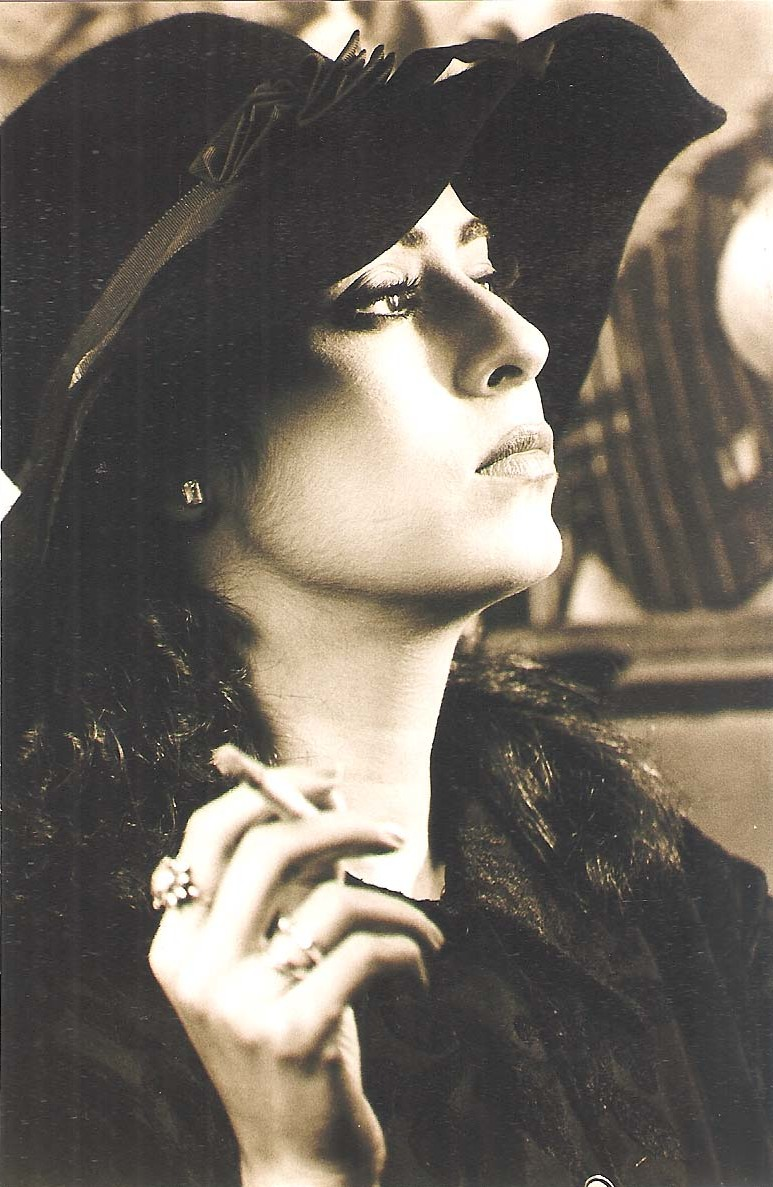
- Nivedita Bhattacharya in Cloud Seven
- Born: 21 July 1970 (age 56); Lucknow, Uttar Pradesh, India
- Education: Isabella Thoburn College, Lucknow
- Occupation: Actor
- Years active: 1997–present
- Spouse: Kay Kay Menon
- Awards: Star Guild Award for Best Actor in a Negative Role

Nivedita Bhattacharya (born 21 July 1970) is an Indian actress who works in Hindi films.

She is known for TV shows Saat Phere, Saloni Ka Safar and Koi Laut Ke Aaya Hai. Also for web-series Bambai Meri Jaan and film The Vaccine War (2023).

== Early life ==
Bhattacharya graduated from Isabella Thoburn College, Lucknow.

== Filmography ==
Key
†	Denotes films that have not yet been released

Year	Film	Role	Notes
2000	Kya Kehna	Preity Zinta's sister-in-law	
2014	Darr @ the Mall	Tisha	
2016	Phobia	Anusha	
2017	Shubh Mangal Saavdhan	Vinita	
2018	Aiyaary	News reporter	
2019	Chicken Curry Law	Satya Deshmukh	
2021	Shaadistan	Arshi's mother	
2023	The Vaccine War	Dr. Pragya Yadav	

== Television ==
Year	Show	Role	Notes
1997	Kya Baat Hai	Priyanka Mehta	Co-stars Darshan Jariwala, Dilip Joshi and Vrajesh Hirjee
1997	Margarita	Rose Braganza	Co-stars Milind Soman and Rajeshwari Sachdev
1998	X Zone		Episode 1 & 4–7
1999	Saturday Suspense	Deepa	Episodic Role (Episode 95)
1999	Suspense Hour	Madhavi	Episodic Role (Episode 12)
1999–2001	Rishtey	Various episodes	
2000–2001	Kundali	Aarti Abhishek Agarwal	Co-stars Prachi Shah and Yash Tonk
2003–2004	Kahaani Ghar Ghar Ki	Avantika Ajay Agarwal	
2001	Kaahin Kissii Roz	Monica Bose	
2001	Khatta Meetha	Anju	Co-stars Aanjjan Srivastav and Himani Shivpuri
2004	Raat Hone Ko Hai	Ruma	Episodic Role (Episode 1 – Episode 4)
2004	Bhagwan Bachaye Inko		Co-stars Dilip Joshi, Sumeet Raghavan, Amit Mistry, Hritu Deepak, Sucheta Khanna
2004	Chaudah Phere		Pankaj Tripathi, Suraj Thapar
2006–2007; 2008–2009	Saat Phere: Saloni Ka Safar	Urvashi Brijesh Singh / Urvashi Veer Singh	Negative Role
2010–2011	Gunahon Ka Devta	Bhauji, Avdhesh's sister-in-law	Negative Role
2011, 2014	Balika Vadhu	Shivani Rajadhayasak	
2017	Koi Laut Ke Aaya Hai	Ratna Shekhari	Negative Role
2022	Salt City	Vibha	Web series on SonyLIV
2023	Bambai Meri Jaan	Sakina Kadri	Web series on Amazon Prime Video
