= Siddhanth Kapoor =

Indian actor & assistant director

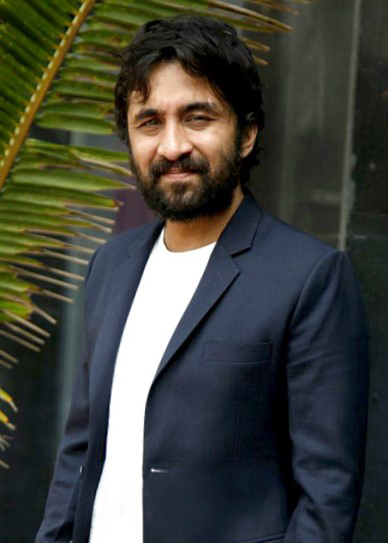
- Kapoor promoting Haseena Parkar in 2017
- Born: 6 July 1984 (age 42); Mumbai, Maharashtra, India
- Occupation: Actor
- Years active: 1997–present
- Father: Shakti Kapoor
- Relatives: Shraddha Kapoor (sister)
- Family: Kapoor family

Siddhanth Kapoor (born 6 July 1984) is an Indian actor and assistant director who works in Bollywood. Son of actor Shakti Kapoor and brother of actress Shraddha Kapoor, he started his career by working as an assistant director in various films such as the 2007 comedy horror Bhool Bhulaiya, the 2006 comedy murder mystery Bhagam Bhag, the 2006 comedy drama Chup Chup Ke and the 2007 comedy Dhol. He then started acting in Sanjay Gupta's crime film Shootout at Wadala (2013) and later featured in Anurag Kashyap's psychological thriller film Ugly (2014).

== Early life and career ==
Kapoor was born in Mumbai on 6 July 1984 to actor Shakti Kapoor and Shivangi Kolhapure. His ancestry is Marathi and Punjabi and he is the elder brother of actress Shraddha Kapoor and the nephew of actresses Padmini Kolhapure and Tejaswini Kolhapure.

Kapoor studied film making and acting at the Lee Strasberg Theatre and Film Institute. He is also a disk jockey (Stage name Bullzeye), and later went on to work as an assistant director for almost two years with director Priyadarshan in several films including Bhool Bhulaiya, Bhagam Bhag, Chup Chup Ke and Dhol. He was initially supposed to make his debut in Soham Shah's 2012 film Satte Pe Satta, which is a remake of the original Raj Sippy's action comedy ‘Satte Pe Satta’ (1982), but the film was shelved. He thus made his acting debut in 2013 with the film Shootout at Wadala alongside Anil Kapoor, John Abraham, and Kangana Ranaut. Then, he assisted Anurag Kashyap in his psychological thriller film Ugly (2014), in which he played a cameo role alongside Tejaswini Kolhapure and Ronit Roy.

In 2022, he was arrested by the police for consumption of illegal drugs at a rave in Bangalore.

== Filmography ==
Year	Title	Role	Notes
1997	Judwaa	Child artist	
2006	Bhagam Bhag	–	Assistant Director
2006	Chup Chup Ke	–	Assistant Director
2007	Bhool Bhulaiyaa	–	Assistant Director
2007	Dhol	–	Assistant Director
2013	Shootout at Wadala	Gyancho	
2014	Ugly	Siddhanth	
2015	Jazbaa	Sam Maklai	
2017	Haseena Parkar	Dawood Ibrahim	
2018	Paltan	Hawaldar Parashar	
2019	Bombairiya	Biker	
2019	Yaaram	Sahil Qureshi	
2020	Bhoot – Part One: The Haunted Ship	Captain Siddarth	
2020	Bhaukaal	Chintu Dedha	
2021	Hello Charlie	Inspector Jaidev Mathews "J. D."	
2021	Chehre	Joe Costa	
2023	Aseq	Sarim	
2024	The Heist	Viren Shah	
2024	Chalti Rahe Zindagi	Mathor	
2025	Mandala Murders	Ajay Yadav	Netflix series
2026	Human Cocaine	Baby	

=== Music videos ===
Year	Title	Singer	Label	Ref.
2021	Hum Hindustani	Various artists	Dhamaka Records	
