= Yaaram =

2019 film by Ovais Khan

#Yaaram
- Theatrical release poster
- Directed by: Ovais Khan
- Story by: Vijay Mulchandani
- Produced by: Vijay Mulchandani; Deepak Mulchandani; Karan Mulchandani
- Starring: Prateik Babbar; Siddhanth Kapoor; Ishita Raj Sharma
- Cinematography: Ovais Khan
- Edited by: Santosh Mandal
- Music by: Songs: Jeet Gannguli; Rochak Kohli; Sohail Sen; Nayeem-Shabir; Score: Amar Mohile
- Production company: Yashavvi Films
- Release date: 18 October 2019
- Country: India
- Language: Hindi

#Yaaram is a 2019 Indian romantic comedy film directed by Ovais Khan and produced by Vijay Mulchandani, Deepak Mulchandani and Karan Mulchandani. The film features Prateik Babbar, Siddhanth Kapoor and Ishita Raj Sharma. The story of the film follows inter-religious relationships. Principal photography commenced in July 2018 in Mauritius. It was released on 18 October 2019.

== Cast ==
- Prateik Babbar as Rohit Bajaj
- Siddhanth Kapoor as Sahil Qureshi
- Ishita Raj Sharma as Zoya Qureshi
- Dalip Tahil as Sangarsh Bajaj
- Anita Raj as Vijeyta Bajaj
- Adnan Azim as Mohit
- Subha Rajput as Mira
- Nataša Stanković (Special appearance in song "Baby Mera")

== Soundtrack ==
#Yaaram

Soundtrack album by Jeet Gannguli, Rochak Kohli, Sohail Sen and Nayeem-Shabir
- Released: 14 October 2019
- Genre: Feature film soundtrack
- Length: 19:39
- Label: Zee Music Company

This soundtrack of the film is composed by Jeet Gannguli, Rochak Kohli, Sohail Sen and Nayeem-Shabir with lyrics written by Kumaar and Dheeraj Kumar.

Track list
No.	Title	Lyrics	Music	Singer(s)	Length
1.	"Yaaram"	Kumaar	Rochak Kohli	Yasser Desai, Chitralekha Sen	3:34
2.	"Baby Mera"	Kumaar	Sohail Sen	Sohail Sen, Neha Bhasin	3:36
3.	"Kash Fir Se"	Kumaar	Jeet Gannguli	Mohit Chauhan	5:44
4.	"Kya Pandit"	Dheeraj Kumar	Nayeem-Shabir	Mika Singh	3:42
5.	"Kash Fir Se" (Sad Version)	Kumaar	Jeet Gannguli	Siddhanth Kapoor	3:03
Total length:					19:39
