= Ankur Bhatia =

Indian actor and model

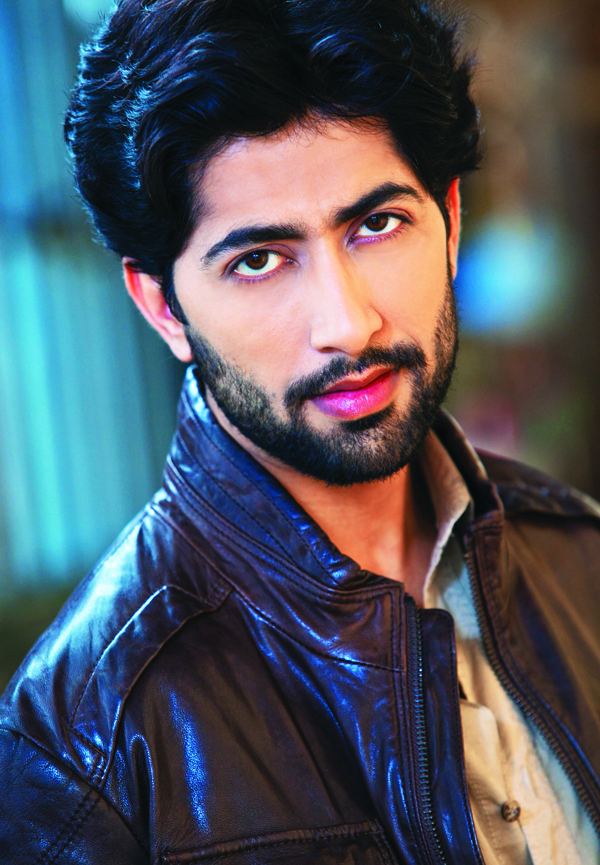
- Born: 24 May 1980 (age 45); Bhopal, Madhya Pradesh, India
- Occupation: Actor
- Years active: 2010–present
- Height: 6 ft 3 in (191 cm)

Ankur Bhatia (born 24 May 1980) is an Indian actor and model. He grew up in Bhopal, India. He made his acting debut in 2010 in Payal Sethi's Grant St. Shaving Co which was produced by Mira Nair. In 2012, he won the Best Actor Commendation Award at the NYU Tisch School of the Arts Film Festival for Coconut Grove. In 2013, Ankur played a negative role in a Bollywood/Tollywood film Zanjeer (2013 film)/Toofan, remake of Zanjeer. He appeared in Apoorva Lakhia's Haseena, starring Shraddha Kapoor, which was released in the theatres on 18 August 2017. In 2020, he played a pivotal role in Disney+ Hotstar show Aarya (Indian TV series), starring Sushmita Sen and directed by Ram Madhvani.

== Early life ==
Ankur Bhatia was born in Bhopal, India. He moved to the United States to pursue a master's degree in Mathematics and worked as an Actuary for top tier consulting firms. He changed his path to Acting as he wanted to become an actor from a very young age. Ankur attended the New York Film Academy to learn Filmmaking and Acting.

== Acting career ==
Ankur Bhatia's film debut came in 2010 in Payal Sethi's "Grant St. Shaving Co." which was produced by Mira Nair. The film was selected in over 10 film festivals worldwide, including Cannes Film Festival Short film Corner in France and River to River. Florence Indian Film Festival in Italy. It won best film awards in River to River. Florence Indian Film Festival, Smalls Film Festival, London and Mexico International Film Festival, California.

In 2012, he won the Best Actor Commendation Award at the NYU Tisch School of the Arts Film Festival for the movie "Coconut Grove", where he plays a funny, street-smart waiter. Ankur recently finished shooting for an untitled film based on insider trading, inspired by Galleon Group Scandal involving South Asian bankers and consultants in New York City. The film also stars Poorna Jagannathan.

In 2013, Ankur Bhatia played a negative role in a remake of 1973 Bollywood film Zanjeer, directed by Apoorva Lakhia in Hindi and Telugu.

In 2016, he played the role of Baldev, husband of Dalbir Kaur, essayed by Aishwarya Rai Bachchan in Sarabjit directed by Omung Kumar.

In 2017, he played Shraddha Kapoor’s husband in Apoorva Lakhia’s film Haseena.

In 2020, he plays a pivotal role in Disney+ Hotstar show Aarya (Indian TV series) alongside Sushmita Sen directed by Ram Madhvani.

== Filmography ==
=== Films ===
Year	Title	Role	Notes
2010	Rendered	Riyaz	
2010	Grant St. Shaving Co.	Bunty	
2011	Coming Home	Lover	
2011	Coconut Grove	Raj	
2012	A Dirty Business	Dev Kohli	
2013	Zanjeer	Bosco	
2016	Sarbjit	Baldev	
2017	Haseena Parkar	Ibrahim Parkar	
2021	Bhavai		
2021	Lubdh	Srikant Basu	
2023	Bloody Daddy	Vikram Chowdhary	JioCinema film
2023	Operation Mayfair	Kevin	

=== Television ===
Year	Title	Role	Platform	Notes
2020	Aarya	Sangram Singh	Hotstar	
2020	Crackdown	Tariq	Voot	
2023	Taali	Navin	JioCinema	
