= Real estate in Dubai =

Real Estate in Dubai refers to the market for property development and investment in the emirate of Dubai, United Arab Emirates. Real estate is a significant contributor to Dubai's economy, accounting for a substantial portion of the city's GDP. Dubai's real estate market has been driven by the city's rapid economic development, strategic location, and urban planning. Real estate is a driver of Dubai's economy. The city's real estate industry is regulated by the Dubai Real Estate Regulatory Agency.

== History ==
The Dubai government established the Dubai Land Department in 1960 to manage the city's land and property assets. The department is responsible for registering all real estate transactions and ensuring that all property-related laws and regulations are followed.

In the 1980s and 1990s, the city's property market was primarily driven by the oil industry. However, with the decline of the oil industry, the government of Dubai began diversifying its economy and investing heavily in real estate.

In the early 2000s, the Dubai government launched a series of projects to develop the city's real estate sector. These projects included the construction of the Burj Khalifa, the world's tallest building, and the Palm Jumeirah, one of the world's largest man-made islands.

The 2008 financial crisis led to the Dubai housing crash in 2009 and a sharp decline in property values and a slowdown in development activity. The government took a series of measures to support the industry, including increased regulation and transparency, and the establishment of the Dubai Real Estate Regulatory Agency (RERA). Since 2020, during the pandemic, developers have largely refrained from new projects.

In 2023, despite higher material costs and tighter credit, developers returned to construction due to increased demand.

== Market Trends ==
According to the Dubai Land Department, the total value of real estate transactions in Dubai in 2021 was AED 155 billion ($42.2 billion). The department also reported that there were 49,862 real estate transactions in Dubai in 2021, with 33,337 of these being sales transactions.

The luxury property market in Dubai is particularly strong, having reached a peak in 2023.

In 2025, Dubai recorded strong growth. Property sales reached AED 431 billion in the first six months, a 25% increase compared to 2024. The city’s population approached 4 million.

== Digitization ==
Dubai has partnered with Crypto.com through a new Memorandum of Cooperation to accelerate the digitization of its real estate sector, as part of the Dubai Real Estate Strategy 2033. This collaboration integrates blockchain and digital assets into property transactions, enabling the tokenization of real estate, digital payments, and streamlined processes for buying and selling properties using cryptocurrencies. Crypto.com will provide technical solutions for secure digital custody and investor verification. Dubai’s Department of Finance plans to allow government fees to be paid in cryptocurrencies, further supporting the emirate’s ambition.

== Projects ==
- Some of the most notable real estate projects in Dubai include:
- Burj Khalifa and Downtown Dubai
- Palm Jumeirah and Palm Islands
- Dubai Marina and Jumeirah Beach Residence
- Dubai Water Canal and Business Bay
- Dubai Creek Tower and Mohammad Bin Rashid City
- Dubai Frame and Dubai Mall
