= Dawood Ibrahim =

Indian criminal and terrorist (born 1955)

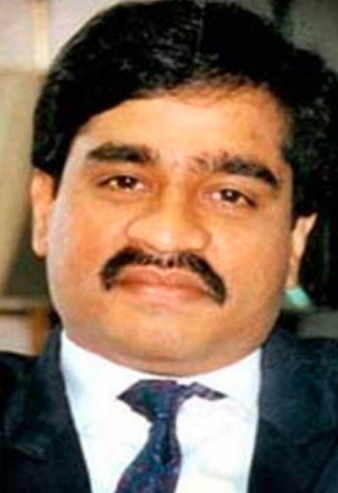
- Dawood in 2006
- Born: Dawood Ibrahim Kaskar; 26 December 1955 (age 70); Khed, Ratnagiri, Maharashtra, India
- Occupations: Gangster; crime lord; drug lord; syndicate leader
- Years active: 1976–present
- Organization: D-Company
- Opponents: DCP G. R. Khairnar; Chhota Rajan; Ali Budesh; Ejaz Lakdawala; Arun Gawli
- Spouse(s): Mahjabeen Shaikh alias Zubeena Zareen and a Pakistani Pathan woman (alleged second wife)
- Children: One son Moin Nawaz, three daughters, Mahrukh, Mehreen and Maria (deceased)
- Relatives: Five brothers Shabir (deceased), Anees, Noor (deceased), Iqbal, Ibrahim and Mustaquim and 4 sisters Saeeda (deceased), Haseena (deceased), Zaitun and Farzana
- Criminal charges: Organised crime, drug trafficking, extortion, targeted killing, terrorism, narcoterrorism burglary, raping
- Wanted by: India; United States
- Wanted since: 1993

Dawood Ibrahim Kaskar (/ɪbrəˈhiːm/; born 26 December 1955) is an Indian-born Pakistani gangster, mob boss, drug lord and narcoterrorist. He is the leader of the organised crime syndicate D-Company, which he founded in Mumbai in the 1970s. Dawood is wanted on multiple charges of murder, extortion, targeted killing, drug trafficking and terrorism among others.

He has been reported to live in Karachi, Pakistan, though the government of Pakistan denies it.

He was designated a global terrorist by the Al-Qaida and Taliban Sanctions Committee of the United Nations Security Council and by the United States in 2003 for masterminding the 1993 Bombay bombings and is said to have an influence in 26/11 attacks. The United States has a bounty of US$25 million on his head.

In a Time list of the world's most notorious mob bosses, Dawood was ranked 9th. Dawood was third on Forbes' "The World's 10 Most Wanted" list from 2010 until it stopped publishing the list in 2011. In 2011, he was named number two on "The World's 10 Most Wanted Fugitives" by the US Federal Bureau of Investigation.

== Early life ==
Dawood Ibrahim Kaskar was born on 26 December 1955 to a Konkani Muslim family in Khed in Maharashtra, India. His father, Ibrahim Kaskar, worked as a head constable with the Mumbai Police and his mother, Amina Bi, was a homemaker. He lived in the Temkar Mohalla area of Dongri, Mumbai and attended Ahmed Sailor High School, from which he dropped out.

== Crime and terrorism ==
Dawood started committing fraud, theft and robbery while still in his teens. In Dongri, he first came into contact with the gangster Haji Mastan, after he attacked two of Dawood's men. Eventually, he joined the gang of local gangster and don Baashu Dada, part of the local organised crime syndicate. In the late 1970s, he later split from the gang, creating his own gang with his elder brother Shabir Ibrahim Kaskar. After Shabir was killed by the rival Pathan gang of Karim Lala, he became the sole boss of his gang and later criminal syndicate D-Company. He was then chiefly involved in gold smuggling, real estate, extortion and drug trafficking. He fled from India to Dubai in 1986 after being wanted by the Mumbai Police for the murder of Samad Khan. In the following years, he further expanded his gang with the help of his second-in-command Chhota Rajan, with his gang having over 5000 members and bringing in hundreds of millions of rupees in revenue annually by the early 1990s.

Dawood had a long-standing feud with notorious Indian criminal Manya Surve.

Dawood is widely believed to have masterminded the March 1993 bombings in Bombay. In a public discourse in June 2017, Ram Jethmalani confirmed that after the Bombay blasts, Dawood Ibrahim had called him from London, saying that he was prepared to come to India and stand trial, on the condition that he should not be subjected to any third degree treatment from the police. Jethmalani had conveyed this to Sharad Pawar, but the politicians in power did not agree to this proposal. As per Jethmalani, their refusal to allow Dawood's return was due to their fears that he would expose their secrets.

Following the attacks, he fled Dubai for Karachi, Pakistan where he is said to live to this day.

It is reported that selective police action against the D-Company during the Shiv Sena administration and its subsequent decline through encounter killings helped strengthen former Dawood aide Chhota Rajan's position in the underworld. This is similar to how Dawood Ibrahim himself had benefitted from the 1980s police campaign against the Pathan gang. The Shiv Sena laid bare its affection for Rajan in an editorial in the Saamana newspaper, its mouthpiece, edited by Bal Thackeray. The editorial heaved a sigh of relief, attributing Rajan's survival to "good fortune" resulting from divine grace. To reinforce his reputation as a 'patriotic don', Rajan threatened to brutally murder those accused of engineering the 1993 Bombay bombings. Saleem "Kurla" in April 1998 followed by Mohammad Jindran in June 1998 and Majeed Khan on 1 March 1999 were shot dead. Rajan is believed to have assisted Indian intelligence agencies in understanding the activities of the D-Company and its members by using his intimate knowledge of the criminal organisation and its operations from his experience. The Pakistani Inter-Services Intelligence (ISI) was subsequently believed to be behind an attempted assassination of Rajan.

In February 2010, alleged Chhota Rajan associates gunned down Nepali media baron Jamim Shah point blank in broad daylight as he was driving to his residence on a public road. Shah ostensibly had links with Dawood and was the mastermind of a racket producing counterfeit Indian currency within Nepal. His anti-Indian criminal activities had rankled the Indian government for more than a decade and a half prior.

The United States Department of the Treasury keeps a fact sheet on Dawood which contains reports of his syndicate having smuggling routes from South Asia, the Middle East and Africa shared with and used by the terrorist organization al-Qaeda. The fact sheet also says that Dawood's syndicate is involved in large-scale shipment of narcotics in the United Kingdom and Western Europe. He is also believed to have had contacts with al-Qaeda leader Osama bin Laden. In the late 1990s, Dawood travelled to Afghanistan under the Taliban's protection. The syndicate has consistently aimed to destabilise India through riots, terrorism, civil unrest and pumping fake Indian currency notes into the country.

Presently, Dawood's criminal activities are terror funding, drug trafficking, gunrunning, extortion and money laundering. He has also heavily invested in the real estate of Karachi, Dubai and India. He is believed to control much of the hawala system, which is the very commonly used unofficial system for transferring money and remittances outside the view of official agents. He was linked to the financing of increasing attacks in Gujarat by the Lashkar-e-Taiba (LeT). India Today reported that Dawood provided the logistics for the 2008 Mumbai attacks perpetrated by the LeT.

His D-Company criminal syndicate spreads across Asia, Europe and Africa, with over 40% of its earnings coming from India.

== Sanctions and location ==
In 2003, he was designated a global terrorist by the Al-Qaida and Taliban Sanctions Committee of the United Nations Security Council and by the United States for masterminding the 1993 Bombay bombings. The United States has a reward of US$25 million on his head. Then Indian Deputy Prime Minister Lal Krishna Advani described it as a major development. Dawood is on the NIA Most Wanted list in India. He has also been wanted by Interpol since 1993 for organised crime and forgery.

In the United States, the United States Department of the Treasury Office of Foreign Assets Control designates Dawood as a terrorist on the Specially Designated Nationals List and under the Foreign Narcotics Kingpin Designation Act as part of its international sanctions programme, effectively forbidding US financial entities from working with him and seizing assets believed to be under his control. In 2006, the U.S. government announced that it planned to file a petition with the United Nations requesting that all UN member states freeze assets of Dawood and impose a travel ban on him in order to identify and disrupt the financial links between terrorism and organised crime.

On 21 November 2006, it was ten members of Dawood Ibrahim's D-Company were arrested by the Mumbai Crime Branch after being extradited from the United Arab Emirates. In 2013, the Nepalese government froze the assets of 224 individuals and 64 entities linked to Dawood Ibrahim as part of an anti-money laundering campaign.

In 2020, the Indian government sold off Dawood's six properties in his ancestral village in Ratnagiri district in coastal Konkan in Maharashtra. The government organized the e-auction of his properties under the Smugglers and Foreign Exchange Manipulators (Forfeiture of Property) Act (SAFEMA), 1976. In November 2017, Dawood's three properties, including the famous Rounaq Afroz Restaurant, also known as Delhi Zaika, were auctioned off by the government.

Many attempts have been made to locate Dawood by the Indian intelligence agencies, Research and Analysis Wing and Intelligence Bureau (IB), ever since he went into hiding after the 1993 Bombay bombings. Dawood has previously been reported to be in Pakistan or the United Arab Emirates at various times. His current location has been frequently traced to Karachi, Pakistan, a claim which the Pakistani authorities have frequently denied. In an interview with India Today, Chhota Rajan, a former aide of Dawood, with whom he later fell out in 1992, said, "He [Dawood] does travel out of Pakistan once in a while but Karachi is his base."

In 2006, the government of India handed over to Pakistan, a list of 38 most wanted criminals including Dawood.

On 11 May, Rajnath Singh, the then Home Minister of India, told the parliament that Dawood was in Pakistan and he will bring him back to India. The claims were further established in August 2015, when a phone call made to his home by an Indian television channel, Times Now, was answered by his wife, who confirmed his presence at their home in Karachi. According to a dossier on Dawood prepared by Indian intelligence agencies in August 2015, to be handed over to Pakistan, Dawood has nine residences in Pakistan and has three Pakistani passports which he frequently uses to travel.

A United States Congressional report claims that the world's third most wanted fugitive and Indian underworld mobster, Dawood Ibrahim's "D-Company has a 'strategic alliance' with Pakistan's Inter-Services Intelligence". Ever since he took to hiding, his location has been frequently traced to Karachi, Pakistan, a claim which Pakistani authorities have denied.

On 22 August 2020, Pakistan amid looming Financial Action Task Force sanctions issued two notifications listing and sanctioning key terrorist figures including Dawood and 87 others. In it, three addresses of Dawood Ibrahim were listed "White House, Near Saudi Mosque, Clifton" in Karachi, Pakistan; in addition to "House No. 37 – 30th Street – defence, Housing Authority, Karachi" and "Palatial bungalow in the hilly area of Noorabad in Karachi". Pakistan denied it was admitting he was in Pakistan, stating the notifications only contained what was listed in the list of sanctioned individuals and the entities belonging to the United Nations. He had been designated by the Al-Qaida and Taliban Sanctions Committee of the United Nations Security Council with those addresses in 2003.

== Personal life and family ==
Dawood's wife is Mahjabeen Shaikh alias Zubeena Zareen.

One of the most detailed report about Dawood's family comes from the alleged statement of his nephew Alishah Parkar in his statement to the National investigative Agency (NIA) in January 2023, as reported by ANI and other media outlets.

As per this media report, Dawood married a second time to a Pakistani Pathan woman, though not much further details are available.

As per Alishah's statement, Dawood has five brothers and four sisters.

Dawood has three daughters, Mahrukh, Mehreen and Maria and a son Moin Nawaz. Mahrukh married Junaid Miandad, the son of Pakistani cricketer Javed Miandad in 2016. Mehreen married Ayub, a Pakistani-American businessman in 2011, while his youngest daughter Maria has died of Malaria.

His only son Moin married Saniya, daughter of a London-based businessman on 25 September 2011.

Moin allegedly lives in Karachi, Pakistan. As per alleged confession of Dawood's brother Iqbal to Indian Investigative agencies, Moin teaches in a mosque, having memorized the Qur'an and has become a maulana, while having allegedly rejected his father's empire, leading to Dawood's depression.

In May 2015, Dawood Ibrahim's estimated net worth was US$6.7 billion.

== In popular culture ==
=== Influence over Bollywood ===
Dawood and his criminal syndicate D-Company have been linked to the financing of the Bollywood film industry. A number of Bollywood studios and films were said to have been financed by D-Company in the 1980s and 1990s. Dawood was linked to a number of celebrities during that time, including the beauty pageant contestant Anita Ayoob and the Bollywood actress Mandakini. D-Company is also known for extortion and threats targeted towards Bollywood producers and celebrities, and was allegedly involved in the murders of Bollywood producers Javed Siddique and Gulshan Kumar.

==== Bollywood murders ====
Prominent assassinations of Bollywood persons attributed to Ibrahim and his gang involve that of T series founder Gulshan Kumar in 1997, prominent film producer, Javed Siddique, in 1995 and Film producer Mukesh Duggal in 1997. All these murders were undertaken on the refusal of these Bollywood personalities to agree to the illegal demands of Ibrahim and his men.

==== Bollywood murder attempts ====
Some of the high-profile murder attempts alleged to have been carried by the D Company include the shooting at producer-director Rakesh Roshan in 2000 just outside his Santa Cruz office where he was hit by two bullets, the attack on Gupt and Mohra director Rajiv Rai in 1997, after which Rai started living in USA and the armed attack on Adlabs founder Manmohan Shetty in 2001. All these attacks are said to have been made after refusal to provide the extortion money.

==== Casting allegations ====
From the 1980s till early 2000s, many Bollywood actors are said to have been given roles in films on the asking and demand of the D Company.

Prominent among these names include that of Mamta Kulkarni, alleged to have been in relationship with Chhota Rajan, who allegedly forced director Rajkumar Santoshi to take Kulkari in 1998 film China Gate, Mandakini, whose photographs with Ibrahim in a corporate box during a cricket match in Sharjah became public, Monica Bedi, allegedly romantically linked with Abu Salem, with whom she was arrested by Interpol in Portugal in 2002 and extradited back to India, Pakistani actress Anita Ayoob, who was allegedly refused a role by producer Javed Siddique leading to his murder in 1995, and even Sanjay Dutt, with whom the connection got established through recovery of illegal weapons and intercepted phone recordings.

=== Portrayal in movies ===
Ibrahim and his D Company have been portrayed in multiple films, particularly in Hindi but also in other languages.

Vijay Maurya portrayed him in the Anurag Kashyap film Black Friday (2004), which is based on the 1993 Bombay bombings. The 2002 film Company is loosely based on D-Company's activities, as were D (2005), Risk (2007), Shootout at Lokhandwala (2007) and its sequel Shootout at Wadala (2013), Once Upon a Time in Mumbaai (2010) and its sequel Once Upon ay Time in Mumbai Dobaara! (2013), and D-Day (2013). The titular antagonist in the 2016 Indian action-drama film, Dongri Ka Raja, is based on Dawood and is portrayed by Gashmeer Mahajani. The film Haseena Parkar (2017) is a biographical crime film based on his sister, Haseena Parkar. Another 2017 film, Daddy, which is based on Arun Gawli, one of Dawood's rivals, saw Farhan Akhtar portray Maqsood, a character loosely based on Dawood. Coffee with D, a comedy film about Dawood released in 2017. In the 2025 Indian-Telugu language action thriller film, They Call Him OG, the character David Abraham (portrayed by Vincent Asokan) is inspired from Dawood Ibrahim and the film's plot is also a fictionalized version of the 1992 Bombay blasts, which was masterminded by Dawood himself in real-life. He is portrayed by Danish Iqbal in the 2026 Indian spy thriller film Dhurandhar: The Revenge.

==== Actors who have portrayed Dawood Ibrahim in films ====
Year	Film	Actor	Character's name	Lead role	Story
2002	Company	Ajay Devgn	Malik	Yes	Based on true events
2004	Black Friday	Vijay Maurya	Dawood Ibrahim	No	Biographical
2005	D	Randeep Hooda	Deshu	Yes	Fictional
2007	Risk	Vinod Khanna	Khalid Bin Jamal	Yes	Fictional
2007	Shootout at Lokhandwala	Unknown	Big Boss	No	Biographical
2010	Once Upon a Time in Mumbaai	Emraan Hashmi	Shoaib Khan	Yes	Based on true events
2013	Once Upon a Time in Mumbaai Dobaara!	Akshay Kumar	Shoaib Khan	Yes	Fictional
2013	Shootout at Wadala	Sonu Sood	Dilawar Imtiaz Haksar	No	Biographical
2013	D-Day	Rishi Kapoor	Iqbal Seth a.k.a. Goldman	Yes	Fictional
2017	Daddy	Farhan Akhtar	Maqsood	No	Biographical
2017	Haseena Parkar	Siddhanth Kapoor	Dawood Ibrahim	No	Biographical
2017	Coffee with D	Zakir Hussain	D	Yes	Fictional
2022	An Action Hero	Gautam Joglekar	Masood Abraham Katkar	No	Fictional
2025	They Call Him OG	Vincent Asokan	David Abraham	No	Fictional
2026	Dhurandhar: The Revenge	Danish Iqbal	Dawood Ibrahim	No	Based on true events

=== Video games ===
The 2018 video game Hitman 2 features a Mumbai crime lord "Dawood Rangan" who is active in the Indian film industry, presumably as a reference to Dawood himself.

=== Non-fiction books ===
Dongri to Dubai: Six Decades of the Mumbai Mafia and Byculla to Bangkok are non-fiction books by former Indian investigative journalist Hussain Zaidi. They trace the evolution of the Mumbai mafia. Shootout at Wadala is based on Dongri to Dubai.

B. V. Kumar wrote DRI and the Dons, an English-language book about Dawood Ibrahim.

== See also ==
- List of fugitives from justice who disappeared
- Organised crime in India
- Tiger Memon
- Yakub Memon
- Chhota Shakeel
