= Abu Salem =

Indian terrorist and organized crime figure

- Born: Abu Salem Abdul Qayoom Ansari; 1962 (age 63–64); Sarai Mir, Azamgarh district, Uttar Pradesh, India
- Other names: Aqil Ahmed Azmi, Captain, Abu Samaan
- Citizenship: India
- Occupation: Leader of organized crime
- Spouses: Samira Jumani (m. 1991, divorced) Monica Bedi (partner) (m. 1999–2010)
- Status: Incarcerated
- Convictions: Murder of builder Pradeep Jain; 1993 Bombay Bombings
- Penalty: Life imprisonment

Abu Salem (/ˈɑːbuː sɑːˈlɛm/ AH-boo sah-LEM; born Abu Salem Abdul Qayoom Ansari), also known as Aqil Ahmed Azmi and Abu Samaan, is an Indian criminal gangster and terrorist from Azamgarh district in Uttar Pradesh, Central India. Abu Salem worked in the D-Company (Dawood Ibrahim gang) as a driver transporting artillery and contraband. Later he rose among the ranks after he introduced a new strategy of hiring unemployed youths from his hometown Azamgarh to come to Mumbai, execute shoot-outs and return the next day remaining untraced by the Mumbai police. He is currently serving a life sentence in India.

Salem is infamous for terrorizing the Bollywood film industry by extorting money from film producers and usurping the overseas distribution rights. It is believed that Salem was the mastermind behind threatening Bollywood film producers Gulshan Kumar, Subhash Ghai, Rajiv Rai and Rakesh Roshan. While his gang members assassinated Gulshan Kumar in 1997, they failed in their attempt to assassinate Rajiv Rai and Rakesh Roshan. He was also involved in several murders and extortion, among other crimes. He was later arrested in 2002 in Portugal on charges of using a fake passport and extradited to India. He was tried and convicted in some cases and was sentenced to life imprisonment in 2015.

== Early life ==
Abu Salem was born in 1969 (according to the CBI; although the Mumbai police says, 1962; some reports suggest 1968) into a lower-middle-class family in Sarai Mir village of Azamgarh district, Uttar Pradesh. He was the second youngest amongst four brothers, though some reports maintain that he was the eldest of four brothers. His father was a lawyer by profession who was killed in a road accident. He started a small mechanic shop in his home town to support his family. He studied in a primary school in Azamgarh and left the village after completing his inter college. He moved to Delhi, where he worked as a taxi driver. In 1985, he came to Bombay to earn a livelihood. He worked as a bread delivery boy between Bandra and Andheri and worked at a garment shop in Andheri West in 1986. Later, he became a real estate broker who operated from Arasa Market in Andheri West in 1987. In 1988, he assaulted a colleague over a monetary issue, resulting in the first case against him registered at Andheri police station. In the meantime, he married Samira Jumani from Jogeshwari, whom he divorced later. He has two sons from her. He loved film and reportedly named his sons after Bollywood actors. His elder brother Abu Hatim, also known as "Chunchun Miyan", owns a shop in his native village.

== Involvement in organized crime ==
In the 1980s, he started working for his cousin Akthar who had a cheap electronics shop near Andheri railway station. Akhtar also worked for Sayyed Topi, a Dawood Ibrahim gang leader in the Andheri area. Later Abu Salem started a travel agency at Santa Cruz with J K Ibrahim who worked for the Dawood gang. From 1989 to 1993, Salem worked as a driver for the D-Company (Dawood Ibrahim gang) and he delivered weapons, illegal cash and goods to different gang members in Bombay. His proficiency at delivering goods at the right time and place earned him the nickname Abu Samaan. In 1992, he supplied weapons to film actor Sanjay Dutt. He played an active role in March 1993 Bombay serial bomb blasts which killed over 250 people, left 700 injured and damaged property worth Rs 270 million. In 1993, he left the country and moved to Dubai, United Arab Emirates when the police started rounding up suspects in serial blasts case. He had a business establishment there called Kings of Car Trading.

In the mid-nineties, many sharp shooters from D-company were killed either by the Chhota Rajan gang or in police encounters. Salem successfully introduced a new strategy of hiring unemployed Muslim youths from his hometown Azamgarh to come to Mumbai, carry off the shooting and return to Azamgarh the next day. Those youths were paid a paltry sum compared to sharp shooters and the Mumbai police also could not track them as the youths had no criminal record with the Bombay police. Soon Abu Salem got the support of Anees Ibrahim (Dawood's brother) and he rose to prominence within the gang. Because of his smooth talking skills, Salem was given the responsibility to manage the Bollywood deals and film financing for Dawood.

He organised stage shows where he invited actors. He was involved in extorting from the Hindi film industry, channelling illicit money into film production, forcibly getting the dates of stars, and usurping overseas rights. Salem first worked under Chhota Shakeel but later split and took to threatening film personalities for extortion. In mid-1997, reportedly went to Pakistan to make arrangements for the marriage of Dawood's brother Humayun. Salem is believed to be the mastermind behind the murder of music baron Gulshan Kumar on 12 August 1997 without Dawood's consent.

His gang members also attempted to shoot at Bollywood film directors, Rajiv Rai and Rakesh Roshan when they refused to yield to his extortion demands. Salem fled Dubai, fearing Dawood's wrath. He finally parted ways with Dawood after being sidelined in 1998. His friction with Shakeel and Dawood's favouring of Shakeel is believed to be the reason behind Salem's split from the D-Company. In 2000, he planned kidnapping of Milton Plastics owner for ransom of Rs 30 million. In January 2001, his men shot Ajit Diwani, personal secretary to film actress Manisha Koirala. In October 2001, four members of his gang were shot in Bandra before they could target film personalities Aamir Khan, Ashutosh Gowarikar and Jhamu Sughand. In July 2002, two shooters of Salem's gang opened fire on film director Lawrence D'souza who survived. He also attempted to kill cine figures Rajiv Rai, Rakesh Roshan and Manmohan Shetty.

== Arrest, extradition and trial ==
He was convicted for the 1993 Bombay serial blasts case, and murder of music baron Gulshan Kumar in 1996, shooting at Indian actress Manisha's secretary, murdering a property builder and more than 50 other cases.

On 20 September 2002, he was arrested along with Monica Bedi by Interpol in Lisbon, Portugal. His satellite phone was tracked using GPS technology. Monica Bedi was a film actress who reportedly had relationship with him. In February 2004, a Portugal court cleared his extradition to India to face trial in the 1993 Bombay bomb blasts case. In November 2005, Portuguese authorities handed him over to India on the assurance by the Government of India that the death penalty would not be handed out. When Salem was in Lisbon fighting India's extradition attempt, the only proof that he was indeed Salem was provided by the fingerprint and photographs taken after his arrest in 1991. Monica Bedi was also extradited to India and later convicted of passport forgery in 2006 and served her imprisonment but she was not involved in any of the businesses operated by Abu Salem.

A lower court in Portugal cancelled his extradition to India for violation of deportation rules by Indian authorities by instituting fresh cases against him that attracted the death penalty. In July 2012, the Portuguese Supreme Court of Justice questioned the legal right of Indian authorities to challenge the cancellation of extradition order.

On 27 June 2013, Salem was shot by Devendra Jagtap, an accused person in the Shahid Azmi murder case inside Taloja Central Jail in neighbouring Navi Mumbai, the police said. Salem sustained injury to his hand as Jagtap fired one round.

Abu Salem was convicted in Pradeep Jain murder case on 16 February 2015. Jain, a city-based builder, was shot dead outside his Juhu bungalow on 7 March 1995. Nameem Khan, an accused in the case had turned approver. Riyaz Siddiqui, another accused in the case had turned approver then retracted and is being tried separately. He was sentenced life imprisonment in Pradeep Jain murder case on 25 February 2015.

Abu Salem, Mustafa Dossa, and 4 others were convicted by a Special CBI court in Mumbai on 16 June 2017 in connection with the 1993 Bombay blasts case. Salem is currently lodged in Nashik Road Central Jail. Terrorist and Disruptive Activities (Prevention) Act Court Gives Life Imprisonment To Abu Salem in Mumbai 1993 Blast Case.

In 2010, a violent clash broke out between the gangster Abu Salem and Mustafa Dossa, which let to Salem's face being slashed with a sharpened spoon.

On 7 June 2018, A Delhi court held him guilty for extorting Delhi businessman Ashok Gupta and sentenced him to seven years in prison. In 2002, Salem called Gupta asking him to call a number in Dubai. Salem had threatened Gupta and his family.

In 2024, Abu Salem was represented by advocate Yatish Dilip Desale in the Mumbai serial bomb blast at the Delhi supreme court, and now representing him Mumbai Highcourt for Release Application in India.

=== Music Debut ===
In August 2013, Punjabi singer Sukhwinder Singh Maan alias Sukha Delhi wala revealed that he would release a song composed by Abu Salem while lodged in Tihar Jail, in his next Music Album. The Music Album shall also feature many other celebrities like Rahul Mahajan and Vindu Dara Singh.

== Net worth ==
Abu Salem is said to be a billionaire gangster worth Rs. 55 billion (Approx $0.67 billion). His cash and property have been valued at least Rs 10 billion, which is divided between him and his wife, Samira Jumani. While Salem stakes a claim to Rs 2 billion, his wife possess Rs 8 billion in cash and property. Salem's investments in Bollywood and hawala rackets are estimated to be at least another Rs 30 billion. The CBI arrived at the figures on the basis of one-years transactions (2000–2001), and are said to be a conservative estimate.

Salem possessed a non-immigrant work visa in the US, where he was employed as a maintenance manager for a marine engineering company. As he operated under different names, he could buy property worth crores, despite his employment background. Preliminary calculations by the CBI reveal transactions worth Rs 2 billion were carried out by Salem in the year 2000 itself. Details of his earlier transactions were not known as his whereabouts are not known. Police sources say that his anonymous but legal businesses in the Middle East are run by his close associates.

== Personal life ==
He married Samira Jumani, a 17-year-old college girl, in 1991 with whom he has a son. Samira currently lives in Duluth, Gwinnett County, Georgia, United States. Post Salem's arrest in Portugal, she told interviewers that he was a "violent psychotic man" and she was forced into marriage.

In September 2002, Abu Salem and his partner Monica Bedi, were arrested and later served prison sentences in Portugal for entering the country on forged documents. In 2006, an Indian Court convicted Bedi for procuring a passport on a fictitious name. In November 2010, the Supreme Court of India upheld her conviction but reduced the prison sentence to the period that she had already served.
