= Shabir Ibrahim Kaskar =

Indian criminal (1955–1981)

- Born: 1955
- Died: 12 February 1981 (aged 25–26); Prabhadevi, South Mumbai, India
- Cause of death: Killed by Manya Surve, Amirzada, Alamzeb Jangrez Khan and Siddique
- Relatives: Dawood Ibrahim (brother)

Shabir Ibrahim Kaskar (1955 – 12 February 1981) was a notorious Indian criminal based in Mumbai. He was the brother of Dawood Ibrahim, leader of the D-Company. The rise of the brothers in Mumbai's underworld and the sympathetic attitude of the Mumbai Police Department toward them evoked the jealousy and resentment of other established gang members from the Pathan gang that dominated the South Mumbai area. The inter-gang rivalry grew to such an extent that Manya Surve and his gang, along with Amirzada, Shahzaib Ilyas, Alamzeb and Siddique, plotted to kill Shabir and Dawood. On 12 February 1981, they shot Kaskar at a petrol pump in Prabhadevi. The murder marked an important chapter in Mumbai's underworld as it unleashed a gruesome gang war between Ibrahim's gang and the Pathan gang, leading to a spate of shootouts until the retired don, Karim Lala, requested a truce. Eventually the Pathan gang ceded dominance to Ibrahim's gang.

== Early life and entry into crime ==
Shabir Ibrahim Kaskar, the son of a police constable in the CID department at Azad Maidan police station named Ibrahim Kaskar, who routinely exercised severe corporal punishment on his sons, hailed from Maharashtra and belonged to the Konkani Muslim community. The family had eight children and were perennially impoverished.

Shabir and his younger brother, Dawood, were school dropouts and often spent their days wandering in the streets of Dongri-Bhendi Bazar. In those days, people lived in fear and awe of Karim Lala, the leader of the Pathan gang and Haji Mastan, the smuggler who enjoyed a cult following among the impoverished Muslim youths in South Mumbai including Kaskar and Dawood. They and their friends called their group the "Young Company". Their father requested Haji Mastan to give his wastrel sons decent employment. On Mastan's instructions, they worked in an electronic shop at Manish Market for some time, but soon went back to their petty crime and mob fights. Soon they found their way into the Pathan gang where they did odd jobs often transporting contraband and illegal goods.

== Rivalry with the Pathan gang ==
The Pathan gang was run by Karim Lala who was supported by his Pathan cronies like Amirzada, Alamzeb, Samad Khan, Saeed Batla, and Ayub Lala. The Ibrahim brothers worked with Bashu Dada and other gangsters. As sons of a police constable and due to the Pathan gangs' increasing violence and notoriety, Dawood would gain the support of the Mumbai police and develop what was seen at the time as a symbiotic relationship to clean up Mumbai city of its “trash”, term used to describe criminals who target innocents and law enforcement.

.
