= D-Company =

Indian criminal organization

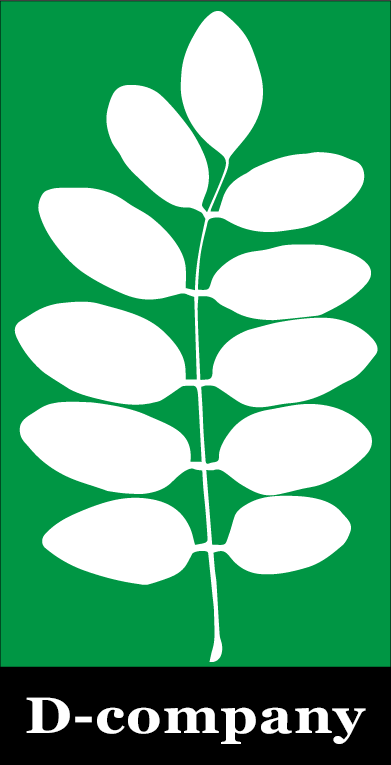
- Founded: 1970s
- Founder: Shabir Ibrahim Kaskar; Dawood Ibrahim
- Named after: Dawood Ibrahim
- Founding location: Mumbai, Maharashtra, India
- Years active: 1970s–present
- Territory: Asia, Middle East, and Africa
- Leaders: Shabir Ibrahim Kaskar (deceased); Dawood Ibrahim Kaskar
- Activities: Murder, extortion, targeted killing, drug trafficking, terrorism, multiple bombings, alleged involvement in 1993 Bombay bombings, supplying logistics for 2008 Mumbai attacks
- Allies: Dubai mafia, Mumbai underworld, Islamic militant groups, including Lashkar-e-Taiba and al-Qaeda, Pakistan's ISI (allegedly)
- Notable members: Shabir Ibrahim Kaskar, Dawood Ibrahim, Chhota Shakeel, Chhota Rajan, Tiger Memon, Abu Salem, Fazlur Rahman (Fazal Sheikh), Aslam aka (ASK)

D-Company, also called Dawood Ibrahim Organization, is a name coined by the Indian media for the organized crime syndicate founded and controlled by Dawood Ibrahim, a wanted criminal, drug dealer and wanted terrorist. In 2011, Ibrahim, along with D-Company, was ranked third on the FBI Ten Most Wanted Fugitives.

It has been designated as a Global Terrorist Organization under the SDN by the United States Department of the Treasury's Office of Foreign Assets Control, with addresses in India, Pakistan and the United Arab Emirates.

== Overview ==
Shabir Ibrahim Kaskar and Dawood Ibrahim established this so-called criminal syndicate in 1970s India.

Other prominent members of the gang include Chhota Shakeel, Tiger Memon, Yakub Memon (linked), Abu Salem and Fazlur Rahman (Fazal Sheikh). The organization has a history of rivalry with the Mumbai police and other underworld dons such as Chhota Rajan, Ejaz Lakdawala, who was arrested in Canada in 2004, and Arun Gawli.

== History ==
In the 1970s, Dawood Ibrahim worked for an Indian local smuggler named Bashu Dada. Bashu Dada was close friends with Dawood's father, who was a policeman. His father wielded immense clout among the gangsters and common people due to his sense of morality and justice, while also being a part of the Crime Branch. However, Bashu Dada and Dawood had a falling-out after Bashu Dada insulted the latter's father. In 1976, Dawood – along with seven of his close friends and his elder brother Shabir Ibrahim Kaskar – attacked Basu Dada with empty soda bottles, a first in the history of gang warfare in Bombay.

After this incident Bashu Dada's key enforcer Khalid Pehlwan persuaded Dawood to start his smuggling operations, which led to the formation of the D-Company. Dawood and his elder brother Shabir, with the help of Khalid Pehlwan, began their smuggling operations. This ultimately led them to clash with the Pathan gang, the most influential gang in Mumbai at the time. By 1986, D-Company had eliminated most of the Pathan gang leadership, emerging as the dominant gang in Mumbai.

In 1993, D-Company associates were involved in the 1993 Bombay bombings. Few have been jailed for it.

In 1997, D-Company former member Abu Salem and Fazlur Rahman were responsible for the murder of T-Series founder and Bollywood music producer Gulshan Kumar.

In 2008, D-Company provided logistics for the 2008 Mumbai attacks along with Inter-Services Intelligence.

In 2011, Indian intelligence agencies linked D-Company with the 2G spectrum case, through DB Realty and DB Etisalat (formerly Swan Telecom) promoted by Shahid Balwa. Later in March, security at CBI headquarters in Delhi was tightened after it had been suggested that D-Company might launch an attack in an attempt to destroy documents relating to the ongoing probe of the 2G spectrum case.

In 2015, a US Congressional report alleged that the D-Company was a "5,000-member criminal syndicate operating mostly in Pakistan, India, and the United Arab Emirates," which has a "strategic alliance" with ISI and has "forged relationships with Islamists, including Lashkar-e-Taiba and al-Qaeda." However, the report had no political implications, and was mainly to brief lawmakers.

Dawood was also wire-tapped by Indian investigators who found out he had real estate assets in Dubai under someone else's name.

In 2018, Dr Louise Shelley, Professor at the George Mason University, stated that the D-Company was now mainly based in Pakistan and had diversified its assets.

== In popular culture ==
At times, Dawood Company has been linked to the Bollywood film industry, as well as real estate and betting businesses, from which it is said to derive considerable revenue. The 2002 film Company is based loosely on its activities, as well as its sequel (prequel to the storyline) D (2005), Shootout at Lokhandwala (2007), and Once Upon a Time in Mumbaai (2010). Black Friday (2004) chronicles the events orchestrated by the Dawood Company that led up to 1993 Bombay Blasts. The 2013 film Shootout at Wadala and the 2021 film D Company are based on the rise of the D-Company. It also features in Salman Rushdie's 2018 novel The Golden House.

== Activity ==
D-Company makes large amounts of money through extortion, kidnapping, racketeering, drug trafficking, smuggling, narcotics, and contract killings. For example, D-Company took advantage to smuggle gold and silver during Mumbai's economic struggles of the 1980s. According to Materia Islamica, they smuggled approximately 25–30% of India's total gold and silver imports. This created a monopoly that allowed their leader, Dawood Ibrahim, to set his own selling prices throughout India.

== See also ==
- Central Bureau of Investigation (CBI)
- Organised crime in India
- Research and Analysis Wing (RAW)
- Terrorist and Disruptive Activities (Prevention) Act (TADA)
