= Bada Rajan =

Indian gangster

- Born: Rajan Mahadevan Nair; 1952; Thrissur, Travancore-Cochin State, India
- Died: 21 September 1983 (aged 31); Mumbai, Maharashtra, India
- Other names: Bada Rajan, Rajan Anna
- Occupations: Gangster; Racketeer
- Years active: Early '70s–1983
- Criminal charge: Murder

Rajan Mahadevan Nair (1952 – 21 September 1983), popularly known in the Mumbai underworld by his moniker Bada Rajan (literally Elder Rajan), was an Indian mobster and underworld don from Mumbai.

Originally from Kerala, he operated a gang active in Mumbai's eastern suburbs of Ghatkopar, Tilak Nagar and Chembur. On 21 September 1983, he was shot dead by the Pathan gang, led by Karim Lala, because he had helped Dawood Ibrahim by instructing a gang member David Pardeshi to shoot dead Amirzada from the Pathan gang.

== Early years in crime ==
Rajan Mahadevan Nair was born to a Malayali Nair family in Thrissur, Travancore-Cochin State (present-day Kerala). He lived in a town in Ghatkopar in the east Mumbai where Malayalis were dominant. He worked in a small factory in Thane. With mounting expenses and greed for excess money and to get the attention of his love interest, he got into the habit of stealing branded typewriters and selling them in the Chor Bazaar. Once he was accidentally arrested by a police team in search of another criminal and served imprisonment. When he was released, he took to full-time crime in Ghatkopar, especially black marketing of cinema tickets, spurious liquor and extortion from shopkeepers.

After a few years, a band of daring youngsters from neighbouring Tilak Nagar were released from jail. They were imprisoned on the charges of cinema ticket black marketing and beating up the police who tried to stop them. That group was led by Rajendra Nikalje alias Chhota Rajan. To increase his muscle power and clout in the area, Rajan welcomed Nikalje in his gang and they were both known as Bada Rajan (Elder Rajan) and Chhota Rajan (Younger Rajan). They soon took over most of the crime in Bombay's eastern suburbs of Ghatkopar, Chembur and Tilak Nagar.

== Rise in the underworld ==
The early 1980s saw a tectonic shift of power in the Mumbai underworld. Haji Mastan had virtually stopped his smuggling activities and Karim Lala was focusing more on his hotel business. The vicious Pathan gang started by Karim Lala was weakened by a split between his nephew Samad Khan on one side and Dawood Ibrahim on the other. The third don, Varadarajan Mudaliar from Dharavi moved in to extend his hold over north-east Mumbai. Bada Rajan often used his clout with Varadarajan to intimidate his victims and rivals like Abdul Kunju, Yeshwant Jadhav and Philip Pandhre. Just like his mentor, Varadarajan, Bada Rajan started the Sahyadri Krida Mandal to celebrate the Ganesh Chaturthi festival in his area.

In 1982, Samad Khan and his Pathan gangsters Amirzada and Alamzeb with the help of Manya Surve murdered Saabir Ibrahim, elder brother of Dawood Ibrahim. Dawood plotted revenge, offering a supari (contract) to kill Amirzada but nobody came forward. Bada Rajan saw his chance to rise in the underworld and accepted the supari. He had one of his junior gang member- an unemployed youth David Pardeshi shoot down Amirzada in the Mumbai sessions court on 6 September 1983.

== Murder ==
Malayali don Abdul Kunju had a bitter and long-standing enmity with Bada Rajan. It all started when Bada Rajan sent his men to assault some youth in Shell Colony, Chembur, for harassing a woman typist. This developed into a deadly rivalry with Kunju. Both Kunju and Rajan had sworn to kill each other.

Aware of Rajan's enormous power in the areas between Ghatkopar and Matunga, Kunju realised that he could not fight the Rajan gang on his own. Therefore, he allied himself with Bada Rajan's rival, Philip Pandhare. Pandhare's gang was further strengthened when Vijay Sawant and Francis Xavier, also known as "Shorty", from Pestom Sagar enlisted with them. After Amirzada Nawab Khan was killed outside the sessions court premises on 6 September 1983 by Bada Rajan's hitman, David Pardesi, Kunju switched sides and allied himself with Kalia Anthony and Mahesh Dholakia of the Karim Lala gang to murder Bada Rajan.

Kunju's neighbour, an autorickshaw driver named Chandrashekar Sapaliga, who was looking to make Rs. 5 million for his sister's wedding, was hired for the job. He was introduced to hotelier, Mahesh Dholakia at Caesar Palace. Dholakia offered around Rs. 5 million as "supari" (murder contract fee) and promised to give the entire money on successful killing of Rajan. Sapaliga left with only Rs. 1,00,000. The next day, Kunju provided Sapaliga with a revolver, and converted an isolated spot near Vikhroli Park site into a firing range. He was trained for the next 15 days by Ramesh Pujari, Mangesh More and Francis a.k.a. "Kaliya Anthony" (Blackie Anthony).

In a daring operation, Safalika dressed as a naval cadet with his gun hidden in the cavity of a thick book, stalked Bada Rajan outside the Esplanade court and shot him dead. The hit was carried out on 21 September 1983, exactly 15 days after Amirzada's murder. Sapaliga was caught on the spot, but managed to escape while he was being escorted to the Thane prison and was killed by the rivals later (though the police claimed to have him dead).

== Retribution for murder ==
The murder of Bada Rajan dealt a devastating blow to his gang. His right-hand man and successor, Chhota Rajan was shattered at the loss of his mentor and swore retribution against the assassins.

It was well known that Abdul Kunju was a cricket enthusiast and often managed a good-sized crowd to come and watch him play. This gave Chhota Rajan the opportunity to use Kunju's own passion against him. During one such match in 1985, as Kunju hit a boundary, three young gangsters dressed in T-shirts and sneakers, including Sanjay Raggad, Sadhu and Chhota Rajan himself, entered the arena on the pretext of retrieving the ball. After doing so, they walked right up to Kunju, pulled out their guns and shot him dead at point-blank range. Another report suggests that Chota Rajan sent Sanjay Raggad and Vijay to shoot down Kunju when he was watching a volleyball match. On spotting the two assailants, Kunju fled the match venue with the duo in pursuit. Eventually, Raggad and Vijay sprayed an array of bullets into Kunju's body that left him dead.

After Kunju's death, Dolakia went back on his word and refused to deliver the remaining Rs. 4.90 million, leaving the now fugitive Sapaliga helpless and on his own. In desperation, he turned to the Thane-based goon Abdul Majid for help. Majid invited him over for a treat at a bar in Thane, which in actuality was owned by Sadhu. Sapaliga got very drunk and stayed at the bar overnight. In the meanwhile, Sadhu tipped off Chhotta Rajan to his whereabouts and Sapaliga was woken up at around 4 a.m. by Rajan's henchmen. He was then driven in a Fiat car to Dawood Ibrahim's younger brother, Noora's hideout at Nagpada. There he was viciously interrogated, tortured and subsequently murdered the next day.

== In popular culture ==
- The 1991 Malayalam film Abhimanyu was inspired by the life of Bada Rajan; and is loosely based on his biography. In the film, Mohanlal plays a Malayali immigrant who becomes a Mumbai underworld don and is eventually shot dead.
- A character of Bada Rajan, played by Sudev Nair, appears in Malayalam film Bheeshma Parvam based loosely on Rajan's actual character.
