= Jenabai Daruwali =

Indian gangster

- Born: Zainab Daruwesh Gandhi; Dongri, India
- Other names: Jenabai Chavalwaali; "Maasi"
- Occupations: Bootlegger, underworld mediator
- Known for: Mumbai's first female "mafia queen"

Jenabai(born Zainab Daruwesh Gandhi, c. 1920s – died post‑1993) was a Mumbai's first female "mafia queen". She rose from origins in the Dongri chawls to become a bootlegging entrepreneur and mediator among crime dons including Haji Mastan, Karim Lala, Varadarajan Mudaliar, and Dawood Ibrahim.

== Early life ==
Born in the 1920s in a Muslim Memon family in Mumbai’s Dongri area, Jenabai (then Zainab) was one of six siblings. Her formative years were shaped by poverty and the upheaval of the Partition of India. A Memon by birth, she took to smuggling ration and later liquor after her husband migrated to Pakistan, leaving her alone in Mumbai with their five children. This trade evolved into smuggling ration during India's post-independence shortages.

== Bootlegging rise ==
Transitioning from grain smuggling to illicit liquor production, she earned the nickname “Daruwali” (liquor‑lady). By the 1960s and 1970s, she was a dominant bootlegger in areas like Nagpada and Mohammed Ali Road.

== Mediator and underworld influence ==
Jenabai is credited with brokering a peace treaty among rival factions under the patronage of Haji Mastan. Her relationships with figures like Dawood Ibrahim and Karim Lala made her a powerful intermediary. She was affectionately referred to as "Maasi" or "Apa" (aunt) by underworld members.

== Later life and legacy ==
By the 1980s, her influence declined as drug gangs and violence restructured Mumbai's criminal landscape. Following the 1993 Bombay bombings, she reportedly fell ill and died a few years later.

Her legacy lives on in Indian popular culture and journalism. S. Hussain Zaidi profiles her in Mafia Queens of Mumbai, and Indian news outlets have acknowledged her as a significant, gender-defying figure in the underworld.

== In popular culture ==
A fictionalized version of Jenabai inspired the 2016 Zee TV series Amma, starring Shabana Azmi as a female underworld figure.
