= Manithan (1987 film) =

1987 film by S. P. Muthuraman

- Theatrical release poster
- Directed by: S. P. Muthuraman
- Screenplay by: Panchu Arunachalam
- Story by: V. C. Guhanathan
- Produced by: M. Saravanan; M. Balasubramaniam
- Starring: Rajinikanth; Rupini; Raghuvaran
- Cinematography: T. S. Vinayagam
- Edited by: R. Vittal; S. B. Mohan
- Music by: Chandrabose
- Production company: AVM Productions
- Release date: 21 October 1987
- Country: India
- Language: Tamil

Manithan (transl. Human) is a 1987 Indian Tamil-language masala film directed by S. P. Muthuraman and produced by AVM Productions. The film stars Rajinikanth, Rupini and Raghuvaran, with Senthil, Delhi Ganesh and Srividya. It was released on 21 October 1987, and became a silver jubilee hit. A digitally remastered version was released on 11 October 2025

== Plot ==
The story revolves around Raja, who grows up in juvenile detention due to hitting his teacher with a table weight for falsely calling him a thief because he was born on Amavasya, a No Moon Day. He was born to a superstitious father who believes that a person born on Amavasya will surely turn into a criminal. When his imprisonment years are over, he joins the People Welfare Organisation in a local community and helps needy people. In due course, he gets enemies due to his good deeds. The rest of the story forms on how Raja succeeds over his enemies and disproves the false claims on him and the superstitions and prejudice that surrounded him.

== Cast ==
- Rajinikanth as Raja
- Rupini as Rooba
- Raghuvaran as Kumaravelu
- Srividya as Lakshmi
- Jai Ganesh as Inspector Sridhar
- Madhuri as Inthira
- Vinu Chakravarthy as Rathnavelu
- Cho Ramaswamy as Ponnambalam
- Senthil as Arivu
- G. Srinivasan as Chinnaya
- Delhi Ganesh as Marimuthu

== Production ==
V. C. Guhanathan developed a story named Amavasayil Pirandha Oruvanin Kadhai (transl. The story of a man born on Amavasya) which Panchu Arunachalam expanded into a screenplay. With Rajinikanth cast in the lead role, AVM titled the film Manithan (transl. Human) as they felt Rajinikanth was a fantastic human. Distributors objected to the title as there was a popular play with that title staged by the TKS Brothers, but AVM refused to change the title of their film. Rupini accepted to star in Manithan after another film she was doing, Sir I Love You, was shelved. Two streets were specifically created for the film inside AVM Studios.

== Soundtrack ==
The music was composed by Chandrabose, with lyrics written by Vairamuthu. The title song was not originally intended to be added in the film as it did not have the right situation for the song to be placed; however Rajinikanth who was impressed with this song wanted to have this song in the film so it was picturised and placed in the title credits.

Song	Singers	Length
"Kaalai Kaalai"	S. P. Balasubrahmanyam and S. P. Sailaja	04:23
"Manithan Manithan"	Malaysia Vasudevan	04:24
"Muthu Muthu Pennai"	Vani Jairam	04:19
"Vanaththai Parthen"	S. P. Balasubrahmanyam	04:32
"Vanaththai Parthen" (Sad)	S. P. Balasubrahmanyam, Vanitha and Kovai Murali	05:20
"Yedho Nadakkirathu"	K. J. Yesudas and K. S. Chithra	04:44

== Release ==
Manithan was released 21 October 1987, Diwali day. Despite facing competition from Nayakan, released on the same day, it became more successful, and a silver jubilee hit. The film's silver jubilee function was held at Rajeshwari Marriage Hall in late April 1988. (Note: In his column for Hindu Tamil Thisai, Cinema Eduthu Paar, Muthuraman said the event was held on 20 April 1988. However, in his memoir AVM Thandha SPM, he said it was celebrated on 24 April and erroneously mentioned 1998 as the year.) Chandrabose won the award for Best Music Director at the 8th Cinema Express Awards.

== Critical reception ==
N. Krishnaswamy of The Indian Express wrote, "It is a no-holds-barred commercial film, but the formula works." Jayamanmadhan of Kalki, however, reviewed the film more negatively for being too formulaic. Balumani of Anna praised the acting, humour, music and direction.

== Legacy ==
Manithan was screened alongside other films of Rajinikanth like Murattu Kaalai, Pokkiri Raja, Paayum Puli at Albert theatre, on the occasion of his birthday on 12 December 2012. The film's title inspired that of a 2016 film. The 1987 film was re-released on 11 October 2025 after being digitally remastered.

== Bibliography ==
- Saravanan, M. (2013) [2005]. AVM 60 Cinema (in Tamil) (3rd ed.). Rajarajan Pathippagam. OCLC 1158347612.
- Muthuraman, S. P. (2017) [2005]. AVM Thandha SPM (in Tamil) (3rd ed.). Vikatan. OCLC 607342391.
