= Organised crime in India =

Indian mafia
- Founded: 1940s
- Founding location: India
- Years active: 1940s–present
- Territory: India, Pakistan, Afghanistan, Nepal, Bangladesh, Thailand, Sri Lanka, United Kingdom, Australia, United States, Bolivia, Brazil, Colombia, Mauritius, Iran, Malaysia, Singapore, Kuwait, Qatar, UAE, Oman, Saudi Arabia, Jordan, Turkey, Indonesia, Nigeria, South Africa, Somalia, Fiji, Guyana, Kenya, Tanzania, France, Spain, Italy, Portugal
- Ethnicity: Indians, Indian diaspora, Indian American, British Indians, Indian French, Indian Italians, Spanish Indians, Luso-Indians
- Criminal activities: Racketeering, smuggling, extortion, loan sharking, money laundering, robbery, arms trafficking, drug trafficking, illegal gambling, illegal mining, bribery, skimming, murder, contract killing, kidnapping, forgery, assault
- Allies: Afghan mafia Russian Mafia; Italian Mafia; British Firms

There is no firm data to indicate the number of organised criminal gangs operating in India, their membership, their modus operandi, and the areas of their operations. Their structure and leadership patterns may not strictly fall in line with the classical Sicilian Mafia.

Indian organized crime is also prevalent outside of India, mainly in western countries such as Canada, the United States and the United Kingdom. In Canada Indian organized crime groups have been involved in extortion, targeted violence and terrorism. The ongoing diplomatic row between Canada and India is in relation to this. Unrelated to the established crime groups in India, are there also crime groups of Indian-origin engaging in criminal activities such as drugtrafficking, extortion, smuggling and money laundering in Canada and the United Kingdom.

== Mumbai underworld ==
Mumbai is the financial capital of India. Over a period of time, the Mumbai underworld has been dominated by several different groups and mobsters.

=== 1940s–1980s ===
The powerful trio of Haji Mastan, Varadarajan Mudaliar, and Karim Lala enjoyed backing from their communities.

Haji Mastan, originally known as Mastan Haider Mirza, was a Bombay-based Tamil mobster who became the first celebrity gangster in the city of Bombay (now Mumbai). Born in 1926 in a Tamil family in Pannaikulam, near Ramanathapuram, Tamil Nadu. At age 8, he moved to Bombay with his father. The father–son duo ran a small cycle repair shop in Crawford market. Ten years later, in 1944, Mastan joined the Bombay docks as a porter and from there entered organised crime. He worked in association with Karim Lala and by the 1960s became a rich man. He amassed millions from smuggling gold, silver, and electronic goods and expanded his clout in the film industry by investing his money with directors and studios in Bollywood film production. As Mastan's influence in Bollywood grew, he began to produce films himself and was a well-known producer.

Varadarajan Mudaliar, popularly known as Vardha Bhai, was a Bombay-based ethnic Tamil mobster. He came to be known as Vardhabhai, operated from the early 1960s to 1980, and was accorded equal clout to Haji Mastan and Karim Lala. Starting off as a porter, he had his first brush with the crime world when he began selling illicit liquor. He commanded much respect within the Tamil community and ran a parallel justice system where his verdict was the final law of the land and binding in areas such as Dharavi and Matunga, which are believed to have a large presence of Tamils. Mudaliar, in tandem with Haji Mastan, ventured into stealing dock cargo. He later diversified into contract killings and the narcotics trade. He enjoyed a successful stint in the 1970s controlling the criminal operations in the east and north-central Bombay. Karim Lala commanded south and central Bombay, and the majority of smuggling and illegal construction financing was Haji Mastan's domain.

Karim Lala and his family members' groups operated in the Bombay docks. They were often called "Afghan mafia" or "Pathan mafia", terms coined by Bombay law enforcement because the majority of this crime syndicate's members were ethnic Pashtuns from Afghanistan's Kunar province. They were especially involved in hashish trafficking, protection rackets, extortion, illegal gambling, gold smuggling, and contract killings and held a firm stranglehold over parts of Mumbai's underworld. The Bombay Underworld has been involved with Gold Smuggling and Trade with East Africa and South Africa as well. The Underworld has expanded to Turkey as well. Lala controlled bootlegging and gambling in the city in 1940, and was the undisputed king of the trade until 1985.

=== 1980s–present ===
D-Company is the organised crime group controlled by Dawood Ibrahim which originated in Mumbai. It has been argued that the D-Company is not a stereotypical organised crime cartel in the strict sense of the word, but rather a collusion of criminal terrorist groups based around Ibrahim's personal control and leadership. Ibrahim is currently on Interpol's wanted list for cheating, criminal conspiracy, and running an organised crime syndicate, and in 2008 he was number two on Forbes' list of The World's 10 Most Wanted. He is accused of heading an illegal empire against India and Indians. After the 1993 Bombay bombings, which Ibrahim allegedly organised and financed with Tiger Memon, both men became part of India's most wanted. According to the United States Department of the Treasury, Ibrahim may have had ties with Osama bin Laden. Consequently, the United States declared Ibrahim a "Specially Designated Global Terrorist" in 2003 and pursued the matter before the United Nations in an attempt to freeze his assets around the world and crack down on his operations. Indian and Russian intelligence agencies have pointed out Ibrahim's possible involvement in several other terror attacks, including the 2008 Mumbai attacks. Ever since he went into hiding, Ibrahim's location has been frequently traced to Karachi, Pakistan, a claim which Pakistani authorities have denied.

Chotta Rajan is the boss of a major crime syndicate based in Mumbai. He was a former key aide and lieutenant of Dawood Ibrahim. Starting as a petty thief and bootlegger working for Rajan Nair, also known as Bada Rajan (Big Rajan), Chota Rajan took the reins of Bada Rajan's gang after Bada Rajan's murder. Later, he was affiliated with and operated at the behest of Dawood in Mumbai and eventually fled India to Dubai in 1988. Following the split between Dawood Ibrahim and Chhota Rajan, Chhota Shakeel dispatched a hit squad that included operative Munna Jhingada to Bangkok in 2000 to launch a deadly assassination attempt on Rajan, resulting in the death of Rajan's associate Rohit Verma and Jhingada's subsequent arrest by Thai authorities. Former Chhota Rajan lieutenant Santosh Shetty also established a base in Bangkok, where he managed gang operations and orchestrated the October 2010 murder of rival gangster Bharat Nepali in a local hotel before being arrested by Thai police in August 2011. He is wanted for many criminal cases that include extortion, murder, smuggling, drug trafficking, and film finance. His brother is said to produce films financed by Rajan. He is wanted in 17 murder cases and several more attempted murders. Chhota Rajan was arrested in Bali by Indonesian police on 25 October 2015. He was extradited to India on 6 November after 27 years on the run and is currently awaiting trial in CBI custody.

Arun Gawli's gang is based at Dagdi Chawl in Byculla, Mumbai. Gawli started his criminal activities there and used the rooms there for keeping kidnapped persons, torturing them, extorting money from them, and murdering them. The police raided the premises several times and finally broke his operations. He has been arrested several times for criminal activities and detained for long periods during a trial. However, he could not be convicted in most of the cases as witnesses would not depose against him for fear. He, along with eleven others, were finally convicted for the murder of Shiv Sena politician Kamalakar Jamsandekar by a court in August 2012.

== Colonial times ==
=== Dacoity ===
Dacoity is a term used for "banditry" in the Indian subcontinent. The spelling is the anglicised version of the Hindustani word daaku, "dacoit" /dəˈkɔɪt/ is a colloquial Indian English word with this meaning, it appears in the Glossary of Colloquial Anglo-Indian Words and Phrases (1903). Banditry is criminal activity involving robbery by groups of armed bandits. The East India Company established the Thuggee and Dacoity Department in 1830, and the Thuggee and Dacoity Suppression Acts, 1836–1848 were enacted in British India under East India Company rule. Areas with ravines or forests, such as Chambal and Chilapata Forests, were once known for dacoits.

=== Thuggee ===
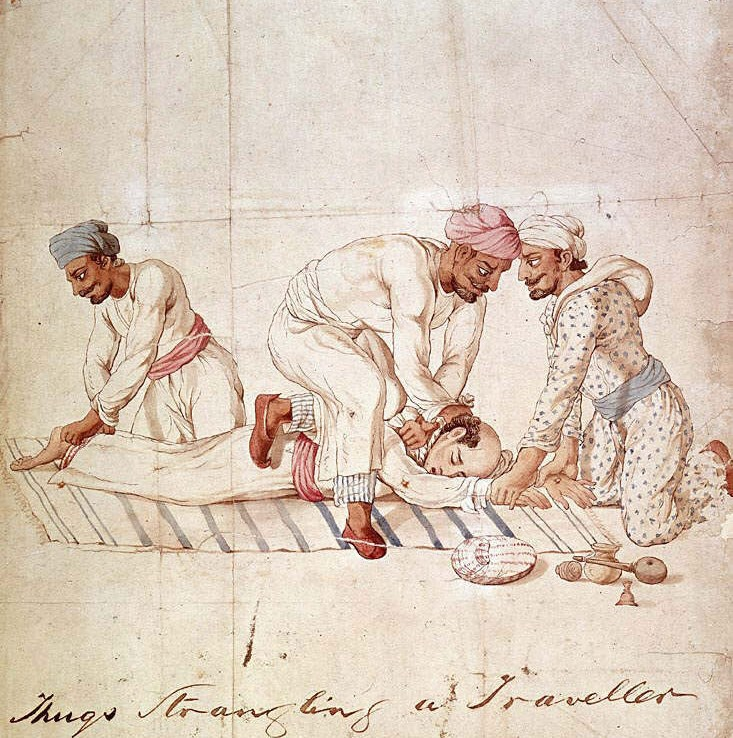
Thugs strangling a traveller.

Thuggee were crimes carried out by organized gangs of robbers and murderers which operated in the northern and eastern parts of the Indian subcontinent. Thugs were gangs of highway robbers, who tricked and strangled their victims with a handkerchief or noose. They would then rob and bury their victims. Sometimes they mutilated the corpses of their victims to avoid detection. The leader of a gang was called a 'jemadar'. The usage of military ranks like 'jemadar', 'subedar' and 'private' suggests that these gangs had military links. Although strangulation was their main method of murder, they also used blades and poison. The thugs comprised some who had inherited thuggee as a family vocation, and others who were forced to turn to it out of necessity. The leadership of many of the groups tended to be hereditary with family members sometimes serving together in the same band. Such Thugs were known as aseel. Not all thugs were trained by their family but rather by experienced thugs called 'guru'. While they usually kept their acts a secret, female thugs also existed and were called baronee in Ramasee, while an important male Thug was called baroo.

Thugs considered themselves to be the children of Kali, having been created from her sweat.

== Organised crime in Andhra Pradesh ==
There are families with blood feuds with each other in the Rayalaseema region of Andhra Pradesh and parts of eastern Karnataka in India, and associated with alleged Mafia Raj. It is locally referred to as "factionalism" and involves various crimes. Activities like illegal mining are common and one of the major social and environmental issues in the region. It also persists due to illiteracy and lack of environmental awareness in the region and public inactivity, having led to severe deforestation and desertification in the region. The vendetta between the groups originated historically during the Vijayanagara Empire. This often co-exists with mafia states. Much of the mining and real estate mafia in the region is run by such families, and to avoid punishment, they are often involved in corruption and local politics. There have been numerous murders committed by rival families, including the murders of noteworthy politicians. Factionalism is one of the main reasons for which vendetta politics is widely practiced in Andhra Pradesh, and is also a major cause of rioting and domestic terrorism in the region.

== Organised crime in Goa ==
Several local Indian, Russian, Israeli, Brazilian, and Nigerian criminal groups are reported to be heavily involved in the organised drug trade in Goa, one of the smallest states of India. Sources reveal that there are also individual players who are British, Brazilian, French, Italian, Portuguese, and of other European nationalities. Some have been visiting the state for over two decades and have their fixed international and local clientele. Organized criminal syndicates in Brazil, such as the Primeiro Comando da Capital (PCC) and Comando Vermelho, source their cocaine from Bolivia and Peru, trafficking it into India primarily via air routes using individual passengers and professional mules who conceal the drug internally or in light luggage. Goa has, in recent days, become a principal hub of the international drug trade apart from being a key point of consumption. According to estimates, drugs flowing out of different foreign locations lands on the comparatively unguarded Goan coastline as Mumbai and its hinterland are no longer considered an easy route for trafficking since checks by the Coastguard, Navy, Customs, and other government bodies began.

== Organised crime in Punjab ==
There has been a spurt in the formation and activities of such criminal gangs in Punjab over the last decade even though some gangs, have been operational in the state since the end of militancy in Punjab. Post militancy, the gangs took to contract killings. The real estate and industrial sector boom of the early 2000s saw several criminals surfacing with the primary objective of controlling unions. The flourishing of the banking sector, especially finance companies, spurred the demand for bouncers who ensured recovery of bad loans and helped in taking disputed properties. Cricket bookies also use the services of these bouncers. Around five years back when the boom in real estate ended, these gangs then turned to extortion and protection money as their source of income. Most of these are inter-state gangs as well as the ones specializing in arms smuggling, narcotics and abduction. Kidnappings for ransom in Punjab, are something which rarely happen.

== Organised crime in Gujarat ==
The Gujarati Underworld holds ties with United Arab Emirates, South Africa, and East Africa Mafia. Activities include Bootlegging, Maritime Smuggling, and Illegal Mining. Despite Gujarat’s strict prohibition laws, organized crime networks drive a pervasive bootlegging industry through inter-state smuggling. The devastating human toll of this illegal trade was highlighted by the 2022 Gujarat alcohol poisoning, in which at least 42 people died and more than 97 were hospitalized after consuming spurious liquor made with stolen toxic methyl alcohol in the Botad district. Operatives linked to the Gujarat underworld have engaged in maritime smuggling and bootlegging networks, facilitating the illicit transit of contraband—such as narcotics and illegal liquor—between the coastal state of Gujarat and East African hubs including Tanzania. Abdul Latif was an Indian gangster and bootlegger based in Gujarat state of India, and was one of the most notorious criminals from the state. He was also an associate of Dawood Ibrahim, and wanted in the 1993 Mumbai blasts case. D-Company used South Africa as an operational base to conspire with local associates, attempt recruitment, and orchestrate targeted assassinations linked to the 2002 Gujarat riots in India.

== Crime Groups ==
=== Chaddi Baniyan Gangs ===
The Chaddi Baniyan Gangs (also known as the Kachcha Baniyan Gangs) are criminal groups operating in parts of India. Gang members perform attacks while wearing only their underwear, which is the source of their name (in the local languages, chaddi, or kachcha are underpants and baniyan is undershirts). In addition to wearing undergarments, members wear face masks and cover themselves in oil or mud to protect their identities.

The gangs tend to move in groups of 5-10 people, and wear a kurta and lungi. During the day, they gather at transport hubs or disused urban spaces. They conceal themselves as beggars or common labourers to identify potential houses to rob. Before moving on to a different town, the gangs attempt to steal from multiple homes.

Gang members tie up family members, during robberies, and murder anyone who resists. They often arm themselves with rods, axes, knives, and firearms. When they rob a house, they sometimes eat and leave their excrements. The gang members often rent cars to get around, and are suspected of robbing temples.

=== Kala Kachcha Gangs ===
Kala Kachcha Gangs (also known as Kale-Kachchewale or Kale Kachche Gangs) refers to certain organized criminal gangs in Punjab, India. The Kala Kachcha gang members are robbers and dacoits, who don police uniform or 'Kale Kachche' (black underpants) to evade detection. They put grease on their body as lubricant.

There are many such gangs suspected to be active in Punjab. They usually target families living at isolated places in the countryside and always thrash their victims before robbing them.

== Activities ==
India is a major transit point for heroin from the Golden Triangle and Golden Crescent en route to Europe. India is also the world's largest legal grower of opium; experts estimate that 5–10% of the legal opium is converted into illegal heroin, and 8–10% is consumed in high quantities as concentrated liquid. The pharmaceutical industry is also responsible for much illegal production of mandrax, much of which is smuggled into South Africa. Diamond smuggling via South Africa is also a major criminal activity, and diamonds are sometimes used to disguise shipments of heroin. Finally, there is much money laundering in the country, mostly through the use of the traditional hawala system, although India criminalised money laundering in 2003.

== Popular culture ==
In the cinema of India, particularly Bollywood, crime films and gangster films inspired by organised crime in India have been produced since 1940. Indian cinema has several genres of such crime films.

=== Dacoit films ===
The dacoit film was a genre of Indian cinema that began with Mehboob Khan's Aurat (1940) and gained popularity with its remake Mother India (1957) as well as Dilip Kumar's Gunga Jumna (1961). A subgenre is the Dacoit Western, popularized by Sholay (1975). These films are usually set in rural India, and often inspired by real dacoits.

Examples of the genre:

- Aurat (1940)
- Mother India (1957)
- Gunga Jumna (1961)
- Sholay (1975)
- Bandit Queen (1994)
- Theeran Adhigaaram Ondru (2017)

=== Thuggee films ===
- The Stranglers of Bombay
- Sunghursh
- Thugs of Hindostan

=== Mumbai underworld films ===
In the early 1970s, a new genre of Indian crime films and gangster films arose, set in urban India: Bombay underworld films, later called Mumbai underworld films. These films are often inspired by real Mumbai underworld gangsters, such as Haji Mastan, Dawood Ibrahim and D-Company. These films are often set around Mumbai slums such as Dharavi or Juhu, and gangsters in these films often speak with a Tapori or Bombay Hindi street dialect.

The genre was pioneered by screenwriter duo Salim–Javed. They began the genre of gritty, violent, Bombay underworld crime films in the early 1970s, with films such as Zanjeer (1973) and Deewaar (1975). They reinterpreted the rural themes of Mehboob Khan's Mother India (1957) and Nitin Bose's Gunga Jumna (1961) in a contemporary urban context reflecting the socio-economic and socio-political climate of 1970s India, channeling the growing discontent and disillusionment among the masses, and unprecedented growth of slums, and dealing with themes involving urban poverty, corruption, and crime, as well as anti-establishment themes. This resulted in their creation of the "angry young man", personified by Amitabh Bachchan, who reinterpreted Dilip Kumar's performance in Gunga Jumna in a contemporary urban context.

By the mid-1970s, gritty, violent crime films and action films about gangsters (Bombay underworld) as well as bandits (dacoits) had become popular. The writing of Salim-Javed and acting of Amitabh Bachchan popularized the trend, with films such as Zanjeer and particularly Deewaar, a crime film inspired by Gunga Jumna that pitted "a policeman against his brother, a gang leader based on real-life smuggler Haji Mastan" portrayed by Bachchan; Deewaar was described as being "absolutely key to Indian cinema" by Danny Boyle. Along with Bachchan, other actors that rode the crest of this trend include Feroz Khan.

The crime films written by Salim-Javed and starring Amitabh Bachchan reflected the socio-economic and socio-political realities of 1970s India, channeling the growing discontent and disillusionment among the masses, and the failure of the state in ensuring their welfare and well-being, in a time when prices were rapidly rising, commodities were becoming scarce, public institutions were losing legitimacy, smugglers and gangsters were gathering political clout, and there was an unprecedented growth of slums. The cinema of Salim-Javed and Amitabh Bachchan dealt with themes relevant to Indian society at the time, such as urban poverty in slums, corruption in society, and the Bombay underworld crime scene, and was perceived by audiences as anti-establishment, often represented by an "angry young man" protagonist, presented as a vigilante or anti-hero, with his suppressed rage giving a voice to the angst of the urban poor.

Later films in the genre include Ram Gopal Verma's Satya (1998) and Company (2002), based on the D-Company, which both offered "slick, often mesmerising portrayals of the Mumbai underworld" and displayed realistic "brutality and urban violence." Another notable film in the genre was Black Friday (2004), adapted from Hussein Zaidi's book of the same name about the 1993 Bombay bombings.

The genre later inspired the film Slumdog Millionaire (2009), which drew inspiration from Mumbai underworld films. Its influences included Deewaar, Satya, Company, and Black Friday. 1970s Bollywood crime films such as Deewaar and Amar Akbar Anthony (1977) also have similarities to the heroic bloodshed crime genre of 1980s Hong Kong action cinema. Deewaar had a Hong Kong remake, The Brothers (1979), which went on to inspire John Woo's internationally acclaimed breakthrough A Better Tomorrow (1986), which set the template for the heroic bloodshed genre in Hong Kong cinema.

Examples of the Mumbai underworld film genre:

- Zanjeer (1973)
- Deewaar (1975)
- Don franchise (1978–2012)
- Nayakan (1986)
- Salaam Bombay! (1988)
- Aryan (1988)
- Parinda (1989)
- Abhimanyu (1991)
- Baashha (1995)
- Satya (1998)
- Company (2002)
- Black Friday (2004)
- Shootout at Lokhandwala (2007)
- Slumdog Millionaire (2008), a film inspired by Mumbai underworld films from Indian cinema
- Kaminey (2009)
- Once Upon a Time in Mumbaai (2010) and Once Upon ay Time in Mumbai Dobaara! (2013)
- Christian Brothers (2011)
- Businessman (2012)
- Shootout at Wadala (2013) a film is about Life Of Manohar Arjun Surve (Manya Surve)
- Thalaivaa (2013)
- Raees (2017)
- Sacred Games (2018), a Netflix-produced television series based on the Mumbai underworld
- K.G.F: Chapter 1 (2018)
- Mumbai Saga (2021)
- K.G.F: Chapter 2 (2022)
- Gangubai Kathiawadi (2022)
- Bandra (2023)
- They Call Him OG (2025)

=== Goa Drug Trade Films ===
- Dum Maaro Dum (2011)
- Toxic (2026)

=== Gujarat Underworld films ===
- Godmother (1999)
- Lateef (2005)
- Goliyon Ki Raasleela Ram-Leela (2013)
- Raees (2017)
- Samandar (2024)

=== Mafia Raj films ===
- Gangs of Wasseypur (film series)
- Omkara (2006)
- Amaran (1992)
- Mirzapur (2018)

=== Andhra Pradesh underworld films ===
- Antahpuram (1998)
- Samarasimha Reddy (1999)
- Narsimha naydu (2001)
- Indra (2002)
- Rakta Charitra (2010)
- Maryada Ramanna (2010)

=== Chaddi Baniyan Gang ===
- Delhi Crime (2022)

== See also ==
- Central Bureau of Investigation (CBI)
- Crime in India
- Goonda
- Indo-Canadian organised crime
- Mafia Raj
- Mumbai Police Detection Unit
- Terrorist and Disruptive Activities (Prevention) Act
