= Bharatiya Minorities Suraksha Mahasangh =

- Chairman: Sundar Shaekhar
- General Secretary: Munira Khan
- Founder: Haji Mastan
- Founded: 1983
- Headquarters: Sir Jamshedji Jeejeebhoy Rd, Nagpada, Mumbai, Maharashtra 400008
- Women's wing: Mahila Suraksha Seva Sanstha
- Colours: Green
- ECI status: Unrecognized Registered Party

Bharatiya Minorities Suraksha Mahasangh (Indian Minorities Protection League) is a social and political organization in India, registered as a political party. The party was led by the Indian mafia gang leader Haji Mastan until his death in 1994. From 1994 to today, the BMSM chairman has been Sundar Shaekhar.

In the Lok Sabha elections in 2004, BMSM ran three candidates in Maharashtra, who together mustered 8200 votes. The party ran one candidate in Madhya Pradesh, Bano Bee. She got 2151 votes.

As of 2019, Munira Khan was the General Secretary and contested the Maharashtra state elections from Mumbadevi that same year.

== See also ==
- List of political parties in India
