= Tilak Nagar (Mumbai) =

- Location in Mumbai, India
- Coordinates: 19.0658°N 72.8899°E
- Country: India
- State: Maharashtra
- District: Mumbai Suburban
- City: Mumbai

Government
  - Type: Municipal Corporation
  - Body: Brihanmumbai Municipal Corporation (MCGM)

Languages
  - Official: Marathi
- Time zone: UTC+5:30 (IST)
- PIN: 400089
- Area code: 022
- Vehicle registration: MH 03

Tilak Nagar is a residential colony in Chembur of Mumbai. There is also a railway station on the Harbour Line of the Mumbai suburban railway by this name. Named after freedom fighter Bal Gangadhar Tilak, this is a suburban area in Chembur West, Mumbai, India.

== Educational institutions ==
- Lokmanya Tilak High School

== Notable people lived or living in Tilak Nagar ==
- Anil Kapoor
- Anant Jog
- Vijay Patkar
- Chhota Rajan
- Bada Rajan
- Lalchand Rajput
- Macchindra Kambli
- Vaibhav Mangle
- Tony Jose
- Jay Bhanushali

== Ganpati celebrations ==
Because Tilak Nagar has a major Hindu population consisting of Maharashtrians many religious programmes are held there regularly, with additional audience from the nearby areas of Chembur and from other parts of the city. Tilak Nagar is famous for Ganpati decorations of its pandals. It also has a substantial Christian population with the Infant Jesus Chapel near the station.

== Transportation ==
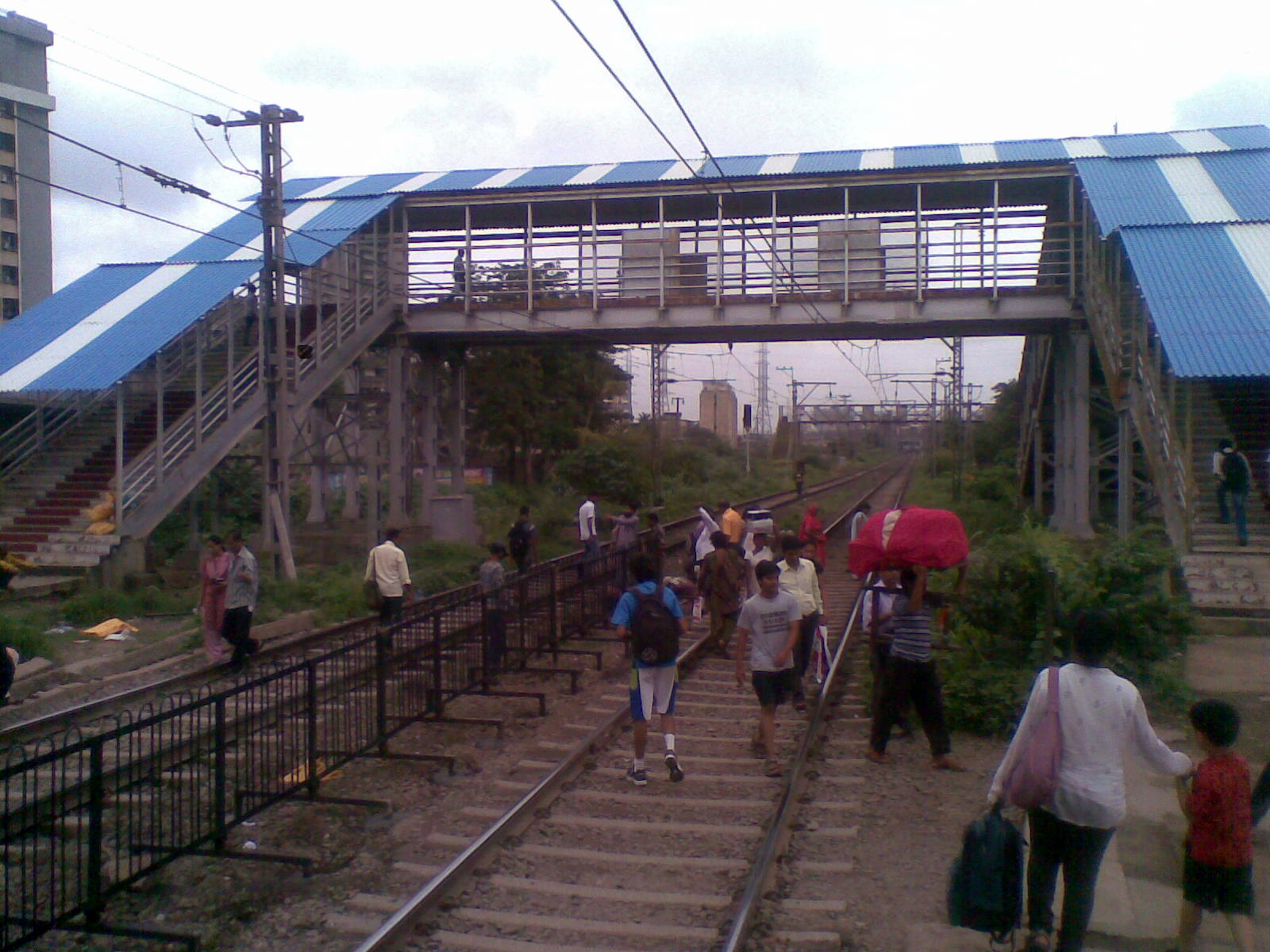
Tilak Nagar Station, Mumbai

Autorickshaws, BEST buses and trains are the public modes of transport available in Tilak Nagar. The colony is serviced by the Harbour line of the Central Railway via the Tilak Nagar railway station. The stations of Vidyavihar and Chembur are also in close proximity. The access to Lokmanya Tilak Terminus (Kurla Terminus) is also via Tilak Nagar station. Chembur monorail station and Ghatkopar metro station are also easily accessible.
