= Hello Out There (film) =

Upcoming American film

- Directed by: Otis Blum
- Screenplay by: Otis Blum
- Produced by: Thomas Mahoney
- Starring: Phil Dunster; Chloe Bennet
- Production company: Handsome Nation
- Release date: October 4, 2025 (Boise Film Festival)
- Country: United States
- Language: English

Hello Out There is a 2025 comedy drama film written and directed by Otis Blum and starring Phil Dunster and Chloe Bennet.

== Premise ==
Two cousins, a journalist and a recently sober musician, begin a mission to Nevada to expose the secrets of Area 51.

== Cast ==
- Phil Dunster as Rex
- Chloe Bennet as Minnie
- Jennifer Beals as Judith

== Production ==
The film is written and directed by Otis Blum. Thomas Mahoney is producer for Handsome Watson, with Purple Intuition providing production services. Chloe Bennett and Phil Dunster lead the cast which also includes Jennifer Beals.

Principal photography took place in New Mexico with a primarily local New Mexican crew and was completed by September 2024. Filming locations included Albuquerque, Santa Fe, Alamogordo and Roswell.

== Release ==
The film premiered at the Boise Film Festival on October 4, 2025.
