= Phil Dunster =

British actor

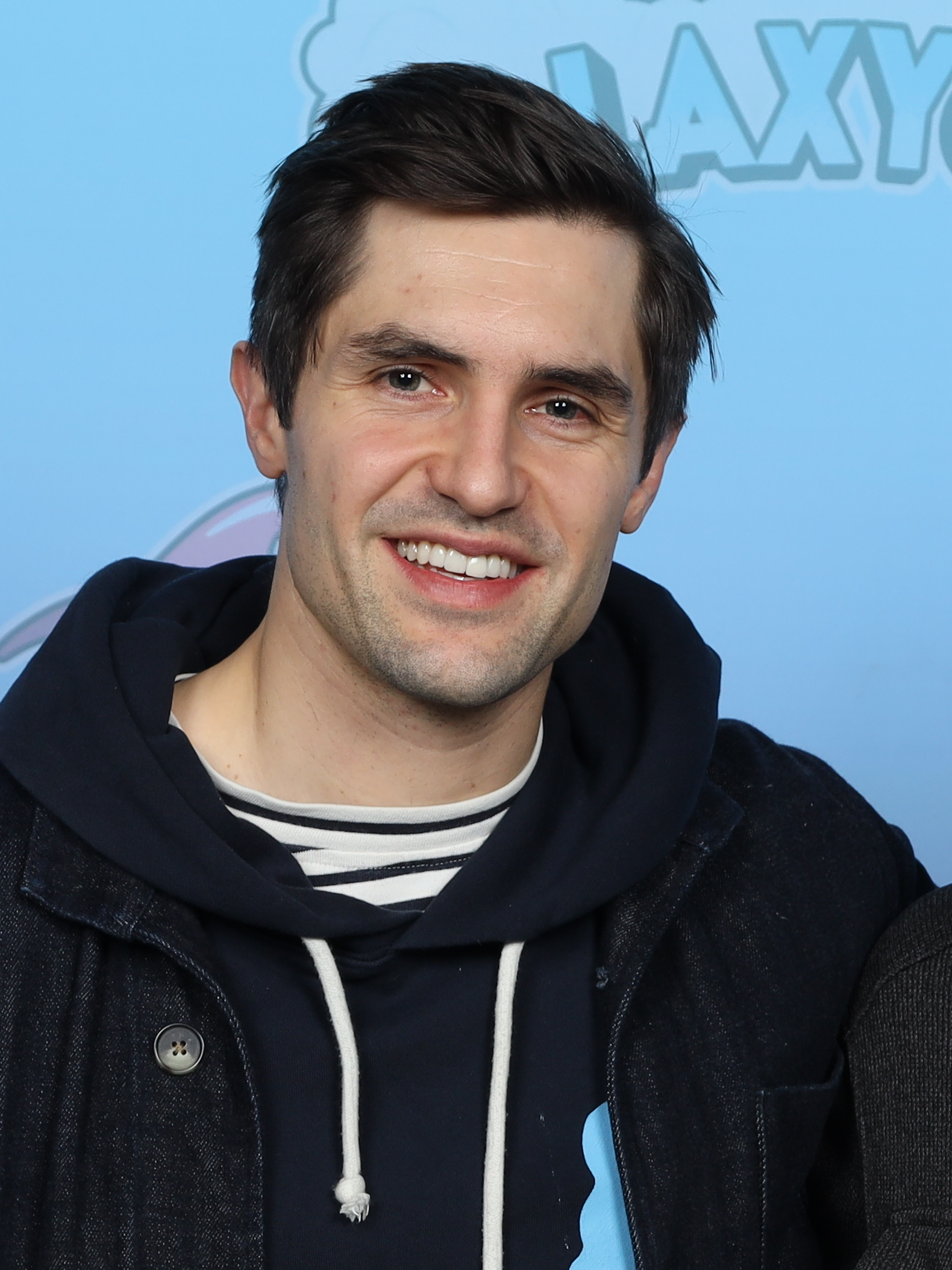
- Dunster at GalaxyCon Columbus in 2024
- Born: Philip James Dunster; Northampton, England
- Education: Bristol Old Vic Theatre School (BFA)
- Occupation: Actor
- Years active: 2012–present
- Spouse: Ellie Heydon (m. 2026)
- Website: www.phildunster.com

Philip James Dunster is an English actor. He began his career in theatre, earning a Laurence Olivier Award nomination, and the Sky One drama Strike Back (2017–2018), the Channel 4 series Humans (2018), and the ITV series The Trouble with Maggie Cole (2020). He gained prominence with his role as Jamie Tartt in the Apple TV+ sports series Ted Lasso (2020–2026), which earned him a Primetime Emmy Award nomination. He has since appeared in the Amazon Prime thriller The Devil's Hour (2022) and the Apple TV+ series Surface (2025).

== Early life and education ==
Philip James Dunster was born in Northampton, England.

He attended Leighton Park School in Reading, where he served as head boy. He played rugby as a child, though he realised at the age of fifteen that he was too small after a failed trial for London Irish. He also considered following in the footsteps of his father and brother and joining the military.

Dunster went on to train at the Bristol Old Vic Theatre School, graduating with a Bachelor of Arts in Acting in 2014.

== Career ==
In 2015, Dunster played Claudio in the Reading Theatre production of Much Ado About Nothing and made his television debut in the Channel 4 sitcom Catastrophe. He also played Dickie Baker in the low budget film The Rise of the Krays, a role he would reprise in its sequel the following year The Fall of the Krays.

Dunster starred as Arthur in Pink Mist at the Bristol Old Vic and Bush Theatre in London, for which he received an affiliate Laurence Olivier Award nomination in 2016. That same year, he appeared in The Entertainer at the Garrick Theatre and two episodes of the Sky One crime drama Stan Lee's Lucky Man.

From 2017 to 2018, Dunster was in the main cast of Strike Back as Lance Corporal Will Jensen for its sixth series, also known as Strike Back: Retribution, also on Sky One. He had recurring roles in the Sky Atlantic drama Save Me as BJ McGory, and the third series of the Channel 4 science fiction series Humans as Tristan. He also appeared in the films Megan Leavey, Murder on the Orient Express, and All Is True. In 2019, he appeared in the Sky Atlantic miniseries Catherine the Great as well as the films Judy and The Good Liar.

In 2020, Dunster began starring as footballer Jamie Tartt in the Apple TV+ sports comedy Ted Lasso, which earned him a nomination for a Primetime Emmy Award for Outstanding Supporting Actor in a Comedy Series in 2023.

In 2020 he played Jamie Cole in the ITV comedy-drama The Trouble with Maggie Cole, and appeared in the BBC One three-parter Dracula. He played Mike Stevens in the 2022 Amazon Prime thriller The Devil's Hour.

In January 2026, it was announced that Dunster would play Eret in Universal's live-action remake of How to Train Your Dragon 2.

== Personal life ==
Dunster is a lifelong football fan, supporting AFC Wimbledon. He has been in a relationship with filmmaker Ellie Heydon since November 2017. They announced their engagement In August 2024. In March 2026, Dunster confirmed the two had married.

== Filmography ==
=== Film ===
Year	Title	Role	Notes
2013	The Film-Maker's Son	Big Robbie	
2015	The Rise of the Krays	Dickie Baker	
2015	Shadows	Jogger	Short film
2016	The Fall of the Krays	Dickie Baker	
2017	Megan Leavey	Coletta	
2017	Murder on the Orient Express	Colonel John Armstrong	
2018	All Is True	Henry, the Student	
2019	Judy	Ben	
2019	The Good Liar	Roy Courtnay	
2022	Pragma	Jack Hurt	Short film; also producer
2023	Panda	Waiter	Short film
2024	Idiomatic	Alex	Short film; also writer and director
2025	Picture This	Milo Bonner	
2027	How to Train Your Dragon 2	Eret	Post-production
TBA	Hello Out There	Rex	Post-production
TBA	Hello & Paris		Filming

=== Television ===
Year	Title	Role	Notes
2015–2017	Catastrophe	Nico	2 episodes
2016	Stan Lee's Lucky Man	JC	2 episodes
2017	Benidorm	Ryan	1 episode
2017	Man in an Orange Shirt	Bruno	1 episode
2017–2018	Strike Back	Lance Corporal Will Jensen	Main role, 8 episodes
2018	Save Me	BJ McGory	Recurring role, 5 episodes
2018	Humans	Tristan	Recurring role, 6 episodes
2018	No Offence	Chief Inspector Pembroke	2 episodes
2019	Catherine the Great	Andrey Razumovsky	Miniseries, 2 episodes
2020	Dracula	Quincey Morris	Miniseries, 1 episode
2020	The Trouble with Maggie Cole	Jamie Cole	Main role, 6 episodes
2020–2025; 2026	Ted Lasso	Jamie Tartt	Main role, 35 episodes & guest appearance ("Don't Jump Around Much Anymore")
2022	Ten Percent	Jordan O’Connor	1 episode
2022–2024	The Devil's Hour	Mike Stevens	7 episodes
2023	Hannah Waddingham: Home for Christmas	Self	TV special
2025	Surface	Quinn Huntley	8 episodes
2026–present	Rooster	Archie Bates	Main role

=== Video games ===
Year	Title	Role	Notes
2022	FIFA 23	Jamie Tartt	
2023	Valorant	Max Bot	Voice

=== Audio ===
Year	Title	Role	Notes
2022	The War Master	Scarp / Kerrif	Podcast series
2024	A Beginner's Guide to Breaking and Entering by Andrew Hunter Murray	Narrator	Read by
2024	The Mysterious Affair at Styles	John Cavendish	Audible original
2025	The Impossible Thing	Narrator	Read by

== Stage ==
Year	Title	Role	Writer	Director	Venue
2015	Much Ado About Nothing	Claudio	William Shakespeare	Hal Chambers	Reading Between the Lines Theatre Company (now RABBLE Theatre)
2016	Pink Mist	Arthur	Owen Sheers	George Mann and John Retallack	Bush Theatre and Bristol Old Vic
2016	The Entertainer	Graham	John Osborne	Rob Ashford	Kenneth Branagh Theatre Company at the Garrick Theatre
2024	Oklahoma!	Curly McLain	Rodgers and Hammerstein	Bill Deamer	Theatre Royal, Drury Lane
2024	Brace, Brace	Ray	Oli Forsyth	Daniel Raggett	Royal Court Theatre

== Awards and nominations ==
Year	Award	Category	Work	Result	Ref.
2016	Laurence Olivier Awards	Outstanding Achievement in an Affiliate Theatre	Pink Mist	Nominated	
2017	Offie	Best Male Performance in a Play	Pink Mist	Nominated	
2021	Screen Actors Guild Awards	Outstanding Ensemble in a Comedy Series	Ted Lasso	Nominated	
2022	Screen Actors Guild Awards	Outstanding Ensemble in a Comedy Series	Ted Lasso	Won	
2023	Just About Write Awards	Outstanding Supporting Performance - Comedy	Ted Lasso	Won	
2023	Online Film & Television Association awards	Best Supporting Actor in a Comedy Series	Ted Lasso	Won	
2024	Hollywood Creative Alliance TV Awards	Best Supporting Actor in a Streaming Series, Comedy	Ted Lasso	Nominated	
2024	Critics' Choice Awards	Best Supporting Actor in a Comedy Series	Ted Lasso	Nominated	
2024	Primetime Emmy Awards	Outstanding Supporting Actor in a Comedy Series	Ted Lasso	Nominated	
2024	Screen Actors Guild Awards	Outstanding Ensemble in a Comedy Series	Ted Lasso	Nominated	
