= Chhota Rajan =

Indian gangster

- Rajan in the early 1990s
- Born: Rajendra Sadashiv Nikalje; 13 January 1957 (age 69); Chembur, Bombay, Bombay State, India (present-day Mumbai, Maharashtra)
- Other names: Rajan; Chota Rajan
- Occupations: Crime boss; Gangster; Drug peddler; Mobster; Extortionist
- Years active: 1978–2015
- Known for: Smuggling; Extortion; Being the former partner of Dawood Ibrahim; 70 murder cases
- Predecessor: Bada Rajan
- Opponent: Dawood Ibrahim
- Spouse: Sujata Nikalje
- Children: 3
- Conviction: Murder of Jyotirmoy Dey (2011)

Rajendra Sadashiv Nikalje (born 13 January 1957),, popularly known by his moniker Chhota Rajan, is an Indian gangster and convicted criminal who was the crime lord of a major Mumbai-based syndicate. Rajan was the Second in command and most trusted lieutenant of Dawood ibrahim and D company during the late 80s Before their split in 1993. Alongside Dawood ibrahim kaskar , Chotta Rajan was one of the most Powerful and feared Underworld Don of India during 80's and 90's.

Rajan was extradited from Bali to India on 6 November 2015 after 27 years on the run and awaited trials for ongoing cases was in custody. On 2 May 2018, he was convicted of murder of a journalist and handed life imprisonment. He was convicted of murder of a hotelier and handed rigorous life imprisonment on 30 May 2024. In India, this was the sixth case in which Chhota Rajan was convicted since his deportation.

== Criminal career ==
Rajan was born in a family in the Tilak Nagar area of Chembur, Mumbai. He worked as a cinema ticket seller in his early days.

He began his criminal career by committing petty crimes in Chembur. His mentor Bada Rajan introduced him to black marketing of cinema tickets at Sahakar cinema, Ashok Theatre in the 1980s. His mentors were Bada Rajan and Yadagiri of Hyderabad under whom he learned the tricks of the trade. Once Bada Rajan was killed, Nikalje received the throne and the title—Chhota Rajan. For a short period, Dawood Ibrahim, Rajan and Arun Gawli worked together. Then, Gawli's elder brother Papa Gawli was assassinated over a drug deal and a rift formed. He never returned. Following the 1993 Bombay bombings, Ibrahim and Rajan fell out. There were even reports that Rajan tipped off the Research & Analysis Wing about Ibrahim's network.

While living in Tilak Nagar, a big colony for the low-income group near Chembur, Mumbai, Rajan started as a petty black marketeer of cinema tickets at Sahakar Cinema in Tilak Nagar. In 1979, he and his gang were imprisoned for assaulting police constables. After being released from jail, he joined the Bada Rajan gang in 1980. After Bada Rajan was shot dead, Chhota Rajan sought refuge under Dawood Ibrahim and started controlling the gang's activities in Tilak Nagar, Ghatkopar and Chembur areas in Mumbai. During the eighties, especially after Dawood Ibrahim fled from Mumbai to Dubai, Rajan gradually rose to be his right-hand man in Mumbai. As a part of a gang war between Dawood and Arun Gawli, in 1988, Rajan and his men were involved in the murder of another gang leader Ashok Joshi from Vikhroli who was a mentor to Arun Gawli. Fearing that Gawli may take revenge, he escaped to Dubai in 1988 and never returned. In 1993, Rajan and his close aides split from Dawood. Rajan escaped from Dubai and formed an independent gang that frequently clashed with Dawood's D-Company. He is wanted for many criminal cases that include extortion, murder, smuggling and drug trafficking. He is also wanted in 70 murder cases and several more attempted murders. Rajan's social organization, "Sahyadri Krida Mandal", which organizes the Ganesh Utsav in Tilaknagar, has been his home base. Rajan's wife and two daughters continue to live in Tilak Nagar. Rajan was arrested in Bali by Indonesian National Police on 25 October 2015.

On 26 October 2015, Rajan was arrested in Bali. Acting on a tip-off from Australian police, Indonesian authorities detained Rajan on Sunday as he arrived in Bali from Sydney. Central Bureau of Investigation (CBI) director Anil Sinha confirmed the arrest saying, "Bali Police arrested Chhota Rajan yesterday at CBI’s request made through Interpol."

== Split with Dawood ==
After the split, he formed his own gang. Reports of bloody shootouts between Rajan and Dawood's hoodlums have been common since the split. In 1994, Rajan lured one of Dawood's favourite "narco-terrorist" Phillu Khan alias Bakhtiyar Ahmed Khan to a hotel room in Bangkok, where he was tortured to death, having been betrayed by his closest aide and sidekick Mangesh "Mangya" Pawar. Both Phillu and Mangya were involved in the 1993 Bombay bombings as police had filed cases on 15 March 1993, alleging their involvement in the blasts.

== Assassination attempt ==
In September 2000, Dawood tracked down Rajan to Bangkok. Sharad used his links to track down Rajan in the city, Dawood's aide Chhota Shakeel then led the hit. Posing as a pizza delivery man they gunned down the trusted Rajan hitman Rohit Varma and his wife. However, their aim of killing Rajan failed. Rajan escaped through the hotel's roof and fire-escape. He then recovered in a hospital and slipped away to evade capture. Dawood Ibrahim confirmed the attack on the telephone to Rediff.com, saying Rajan tried to escape by jumping out of the window of the first-floor room where he was attacked but broke his back in the fall and was taken to hospital. This failed assassination attempt proved costly for Dawood. Rajan's associates tracked down and shot dead Vinod Shetty in 2001 in Mumbai, as well as Sunil Soans – another Dawood associate. Both Vinod and Sunil had provided information to Dawood's associates of Rajan's whereabouts.

While the killings of Vinod Shetty and Sunil Soans did not significantly disrupt D-Company, on 19 January 2003, Rajan's associates gunned down Sharad, Dawood's chief finance manager and money-laundering agent, at the India Club in Dubai. This killing was emblematic of the shift of power between Dawood and Rajan. Not only was the execution in a very public setting, but it was also at a location that Dawood considered his operational backyard. Intelligence reports have suggested that Sharad's death was a crippling blow to D-Company since much financial and monetary information of the crime syndicate operations managed by Sharad was never fully recovered by Dawood.

== Capture ==
On 25 October 2015, Rajan was captured in Bali, Indonesia where Indian authorities contacted Interpol for deporting him back to India. The capture took place due to a tip-off by Australian police stating that Rajan had travelled to Bali with an Indian passport by the name Mohan Kumar. According to CBI sources, the underworld don was standing in a queue at the airport when the immigration authorities asked him to step aside and reveal his name. To this, the gangster first gave his original name Rajendra Sadashiv Nikalje, and then immediately corrected himself to say, Mohan Kumar, the name mentioned on his passport. This alerted the authorities, and they started questioning him. The authorities then started the identification process with the help of fingerprint tests. 11 out of 18 points of fingerprint samples given in the Red Corner notice matched with his samples, confirming that he was Rajendra Sadashiv Nikalje. Rajan was extradited to India on 6 November 2015 and is currently in Tihar Prisons, awaiting trial in almost 70 cases.

== Conviction ==
A special CBI Court in New Delhi on 25 April 2017 awarded seven years rigorous imprisonment to Rajan and three other accused in the fake passport case.

The Maharashtra MCOCA court found Chhota Rajan guilty of the murder of journalist Jyotirmoy Dey on 2 May 2018 and handed him life imprisonment.

The Maharashtra MCOCA court found Chhota Rajan guilty of the murder of hotelier Jaya Shetty and handed him rigorous life imprisonment on 30 May 2024. In India this is the 6th case in which Chotta Rajan was convicted since his deportation.

== Personal life ==
Rajan is married to Sujata Nikalje. The couple has three daughters; Ankita Nikalje, Nikita Nikalje and Khushi Nikalje. His younger brother Deepak Nikalje is associated with Republican Party of India of MP Ramdas Athawale. His native is Girvi village in the Satara district.

Rajan was addressed as 'Nana' by friends and colleagues. His group was also known as Nana Company.

== In popular culture ==
The 2002 Bollywood film, Company had a character Chandu, portrayed by actor Vivek Oberoi, with some resemblances of Chhota Rajan with real-life Dawood Ibrahim gang. Also, the 1999 film Vaastav: The Reality, starring Sanjay Dutt was loosely based on Rajan's life.

== See also ==
- Ali Budesh
- Organised crime in India
