= 8th Cinema Express Awards =

1988 Indian film awards ceremony

- Date: 3 April 1988

Highlights
- Best Picture: Nayakan

The 8th Cinema Express Awards were held on 3 April 1988, and honoured the best of South Indian films released in 1987.

== Tamil ==
Category	Recipient	Film
Best Film		Nayakan
Best Actor	Kamal Haasan	Nayakan
Best Actress	Radhika	
Best Director	Mani Ratnam	Nayakan
Best Music Director	Chandrabose	Manithan and Sankar Guru

== Telugu ==
Category	Recipient	Film
Best Film		
Best Actor	Nandamuri Balakrishna	Muvva Gopaludu
Best Actress	Suhasini	Gowthami
