= The Fall of the Krays =

- Directed by: Zackary Adler
- Written by: Ken Brown; Sebastian Brown
- Produced by: Ken Brown; Sebastian Brown; Craig Tuohy
- Starring: Simon Cotton; Kevin Leslie
- Cinematography: Luke Palmer
- Production companies: Saracen Films; Torn Pictures
- Distributed by: Signature Entertainment
- Release date: 1 January 2016
- Running time: 116 minutes
- Country: United Kingdom
- Language: English
- Budget: $2 million

The Fall of the Krays is a 2016 low-budget British crime film directed by Zackary Adler and written by Ken and Sebastian Brown based on the true story of Ronnie and Reggie Kray. The film serves as the sequel to The Rise of the Krays.

== Cast ==
- Simon Cotton as Ronnie Kray
- Kevin Leslie as Reggie Kray
- Josh Myers as Frankie Fraser
- James Hepburn as Charlie Richardson
- Dan Parr as Teddy Smith
- George Webster as The Author
- Alexa Morden as Lisa
- Adrian Bouchet as Frank
- Martin Ross as Police Commissioner John Du Rose
- Phil Dunster as Dickie Baker
