= Bright Lights Film Journal =

American popular-academic film magazine

- Home page screen shot
- Categories: Film
- Frequency: Quarterly
- Publisher: Quimby Melton (Studio Hyperset, Inc.)
- Founded: 1974; 52 years ago
- Final issue: 1995 (print)
- Country: United States
- Website: brightlightsfilm.com
- ISSN: 0147-4049

Bright Lights Film Journal is an online popular-academic film magazine, based in Oakland, California, United States. It is edited by Gary Morris and published by Quimby Melton of Studio Hyperset, Inc.

Originally a print publication established in 1974, it was discontinued in 1980 to be restarted and re-discontinued in 1993, and 1995 respectively. The magazine moved to online publishing exclusively in 1996 and has continued publication ever since. It is indexed in academic research databases such as MLA (Modern Language Association) ProQuest and the Film and Television Literature Index.

In 2009, select interviews from the journal were compiled in a print anthology, Action!: Interviews with Directors from Classical Hollywood to Contemporary Iran, published by Anthem Press as part of its "New Perspectives on World Cinema" series.

== See also ==
- Senses of Cinema
- The Moving Arts Film Journal
- List of film periodicals
