= The Moving Arts Film Journal =

- Editor-in-chief: Eric M. Armstrong
- Categories: Film
- Frequency: Daily
- Founded: 2004
- Final issue: 2006 (print)
- Country: United States
- Based in: Wichita, Kansas
- Website: www.themovingarts.com
- ISSN: 2159-9297

The Moving Arts Film Journal is an online film magazine. It is based in Wichita, Kansas, United States. It is edited and published by Eric M. Armstrong, member of the Online Film Critics Society.

The Moving Arts Film Journal publishes lists of the best movies ever made. The most recent list, TMA's 100 Greatest Movies of All Time, received wide coverage.

The article Krull Weddings: The Awkward Teenage Years of Movie Marketing received wide attention.

Originally conceived as print only publication in 2004, the magazine later evolved into an online only daily by 2006 and has continued publication in that medium ever since.

== See also ==
- Senses of Cinema
- Bright Lights Film Journal
