= Varadarajan Mudaliar =

Indian mob boss

Varadharajan Mudaliyar
- Born: 9 October 1926; Tuticorin, Madras Presidency, British Raj (present-day Tamil Nadu India)
- Died: 2 January 1988 (aged 61); Madras, Tamil Nadu, India

Sathuvachari Varadharajan Mudaliar (9 October 1926 – 2 January 1988), also known as Varadhabhai or Varadha, was an Indian crime boss. From the early 1960s to the 1980s, he was, along with Karim Lala and Haji Mastan, one of the most powerful mob bosses in Bombay. His origin is Sathuvachari in Vellore, North Arcot district of Tamil Nadu, from where his father migrated to Tuticorin to work in shipping business. He was born in Thoothukudi, Madras Presidency, British Raj (present-day Tamil Nadu, India).

== History ==
Varadarajan was born in Thoothukudi, Tamil Nadu in 1926. He moved to Mumbai in 1945. Working as a porter at Chhatrapati Shivaji Terminus, he began his criminal life by stealing dock cargo. Varada, as he was fondly called, was hugely popular among the poor Tamil residents in the Dharavi slums. He used the massive Dharavi slums as a safe haven to expand his criminal activities into an underworld empire of extortion, kidnapping, contract killing, land encroachment, illegal gambling and liquor dens, manufacturing illicit liquor and bootlegging. Varada had total control over the distribution racket of illicit liquor.

In the early 1980s, after Haji Mastan gave up his smuggling operations and Karim Lala's Pathan gang was weakened by a split between Samad Khan and Dawood Ibrahim, Varadarajan emerged as a powerful contender in the Mumbai underworld. Varadarajan ran a parallel judicial system within the Tamil community in his strongholds. Starting the 1980s, police officer Y.C. Pawar targeted Varadarajan Mudaliar. Most of his gang members were eliminated or imprisoned. His illegal gambling and liquor dens were closed down and finally by the end of 1983, Varadarajan was forced to abandon his underworld empire and flee from Mumbai to Tamil Nadu.

== Personal life ==
While a porter at Chhatrapati Shivaji Terminus, Varadarajan began offering food to the poor at the nearby dargah of Bismillah Shah Baba and kept the tradition up as his fortunes rose.

His opulent pandals at Matunga railway station during the annual Ganesh Chaturthi celebrations were quite famous and visited by celebrities. However, after the collapse of the cotton mills in Mumbai in the mid-1980s, their relevance ended.

During the period of Varadarajan's fading influence, his hugely popular Ganesha pandal was served an eviction notice at the behest of the police in the mid-1980s. This was also the time when most members of his gang were jailed or eliminated, forcing him to flee Bombay for Madras, where he led a retired life until his demise in January 1988, following a heart attack. Haji Mastan brought his body to Mumbai in a chartered Indian Airlines plane for last rites as per Varda's wishes. Many people mourned his death. Life came to a standstill in Dharavi, Matunga and Sion Koliwada when his body was flown into the city. Varadarajan's dear friend, Selva, was with him throughout his adult life, until his death.

A daughter, Mahalakshmi, died of suffocation in a fire at her home at age 50, along with her husband, Hemachander, in 2010 at Foreshore Estate, Chennai.

== In popular culture ==
- In the highly acclaimed 1983 film, Ardh Satya, the character of Rama Shetty played by Sadashiv Amrapurkar was loosely based on Varadarajan.
- In 1984, Amrish Puri played a character called Varadarajan of Dogharbhatti in Mashaal.
- In 1987, Mani Ratnam made Nayakan, which was loosely based on Varadarajan's life. Kamal Haasan portrayed Varadarajan and received the National Film Award for Best Actor in a Leading Role for his iconic performance.
- The 1988 Hindi remake of Nayakan, Dayavan, starred Vinod Khanna as a North Indian iteration of Varadarajan.
- One of the characters in the 1991 Malayalam film, Abhimanyu, which was based on the Mumbai underworld activities, holds resemblance to Varadarajan with the character's name being the same.
- In a television interview, Amitabh Bachchan stated that he modeled his dialogues and mannerisms in Agneepath after Varadarajan's.
- In the 2007 film, Thottal Poo Malarum, Rajkiran portrayed Varadarajan as Varadarajan Vaandaiyar.
- In 2010 Hindi film, Once Upon a Time in Mumbaai, the character of Vardhan played by Ravi Khanvilkar was inspired by Varadarajan Mudaliar.
- In the 2013 Tamil film, Thalaivaa, Sathyaraj's character is mainly extracted from Varadarajan's life.
- In the 2015 Tamil movie Yagavarayinum Naa Kaakka, Mithun Chakraborty portrayed a character mainly extracted from Varadarajan's life.
- In the 2018 Tamil film, Kaala, where the lead role played by Rajinikanth was inspired by Varadarajan's life.
- In the 2023 web series, Bambai Meri Jaan, Varadarajan was portrayed by Dinesh Prabhakar as Anna Rajan Mudaliar.

== See also ==
- Organised crime in India
