= Nayakan =

1987 Indian film by Mani Ratnam

- Theatrical release poster
- Directed by: Mani Ratnam
- Screenplay by: Mani Ratnam
- Dialogues by: Balakumaran
- Produced by: Muktha Srinivasan; Muktha Ramaswamy
- Starring: Kamal Haasan; Saranya Ponvannan
- Cinematography: P. C. Sreeram
- Edited by: B. Lenin; V. T. Vijayan
- Music by: Ilaiyaraaja
- Production company: Muktha Films
- Distributed by: Sujatha Films
- Release date: 21 October 1987
- Running time: 156 minutes
- Country: India
- Language: Tamil
- Budget: ₹10 million (US$772,000)

Nayakan (/nɑːjəɡən/ also known as Nayagan; transl. The Hero) is a 1987 Indian Tamil-language epic crime drama film directed by Mani Ratnam who wrote the screenplay, with dialogues by Balakumaran. Produced by Muktha Films, the film stars Kamal Haasan and Saranya Ponvannan (in her feature debut), with Karthika, Janagaraj, Vijayan, M. V. Vasudeva Rao, Delhi Ganesh, Nizhalgal Ravi and Nassar in supporting roles. It revolves around the evolution of Velu Naicker (Haasan) from an ordinary slum dweller to a highly respected crime lord in the Bombay underworld.

Nayakan is loosely based on the life of the Bombay underworld don Varadarajan Mudaliar and the American film The Godfather (1972). Ratnam was initially approached to remake the Hindi film Pagla Kahin Ka (1970) for Srinivasan and Haasan, but refused. He instead suggested two other stories, one of which impressed Haasan and became Nayakan. Cinematography was handled by P. C. Sreeram, art direction by Thota Tharani and editing by B. Lenin and V. T. Vijayan. Filming began in late 1986, taking place primarily in Madras and to a lesser extent, Bombay.

Nayakan was released on 21 October 1987, Diwali day. The film became a critical and commercial success, running for over 175 days in theatres. It won the National Film Awards for Best Actor in a Leading Role (Haasan), Best Cinematography (Sreeram) and Best Art Direction (Tharani). The film was India's official submission for Best International Feature Film at the 60th Academy Awards. It was also screened as "Kamal Haasan Focus" at the International Film Festival Rotterdam, Netherlands. Nayakan was selected as one of the 100 greatest films of all time by American magazines Time and The Moving Arts Film Journal. It was also selected as one of the 100 best Indian films of all time by the British magazine Time Out. The film was remade in Hindi as Dayavan (1988).

== Plot ==
In Thoothukudi, young Sakthivel "Velu" is arrested by the police, and an inspector tricks him into revealing the whereabouts of his anti-government union leader father. The police track his father and the inspector shoots him dead in front of Velu. After his father's funeral, an enraged Velu kills the inspector by stabbing him with a bayonet before fleeing to Bombay. All alone in Bombay, he is attacked by a group of boys, one of whom named Selva, recognising Velu as a fellow Tamilian, takes him to a house where he is adopted by Hussain, a benevolent smuggler residing in the Dharavi slum.

Years later, when Hussain falls ill, a young adult Velu manages a smuggling operation on his behalf. Velu's demand for a higher commission enrages Durai and his team of rival smugglers, who conspire with a corrupt police inspector, Kelkar, to arrest Hussain and murder him in custody under the guise of suicide. Velu enraged learning the truth, kills Kelkar with a hammer. Driven by guilt, he quietly supports Kelkar's widow and her mentally disabled son, Ajit; the widow, recognizing her husband’s corruption, accepts the aid.

Velu later rescues Neela, a young schoolgirl forced into prostitution, and marries her. They have two children, Surya and Charumathi. Velu’s influence grows exponentially as he protects the Dharavi residents, establishing himself as a parallel authority. When rival smugglers, the Reddy brothers, lose a high-stakes maritime smuggling bet to Velu, they launch a retaliatory assassination attempt through their men. Velu survives, but Neela is killed. After executing the first Reddy brother with a gun and having Selva and his men kill the remaining Reddy Brothers in revenge, Velu sends his children to Madras for their safety.

Decades later, Velu has transitioned into an unchallenged underworld don affectionately called "Velu Naicker." Surya and Charumathi return as adults. Surya gradually joins his father's syndicate despite Velu's warning. When Velu is unwell, Surya hires an assassin to kill a former henchman of Velu who had agreed to testify against him in court. But the police manage to track Surya and the assassin, and as they attempt to flee from the police, Surya accidentally hits a petrol station causing an explosion which kills him on the spot. Blaming her father's violent lifestyle for her brother's death, Charumathi severs all ties with Velu.

Years later, a relentless new Assistant commissioner of police (ACP), Patil, arrives with a directive to dismantle Bombay's criminal empires, prioritizing Velu. When Velu schedules a meeting with Patil, he discovers that the ACP is married to his estranged daughter Charumathi. As Patil launches a sweeping crackdown and arrests Velu's inner circle, Velu goes into hiding. Seeing many of his supporters in hospital, enduring immense pain because of the police beatings, a grief-stricken Velu coordinates a peaceful surrender through Charumathi.

Velu is arrested, but the prosecution's case collapses because the public, out of fierce loyalty to Velu, refuses to testify against him. Desperate, Patil locates Kelkar's widow and the adult Ajit, urging them to reveal the truth of the decades-old murder. The widow staunchly defends Velu's righteousness and refuses to cooperate, but a shocked Ajit learns for the first time that Velu had killed his father. Overcome with emotion, Velu briefly reconciles with Charumathi and meets his young grandson, Sakthivel before entering the court. However, due to lack of sufficient evidence, the court exonerates Velu. As a triumphant Velu steps out of the courthouse to greet a massive crowd of adoring supporters, Ajit emerges dressed in Kelkar's uniform and shoots Velu avenging his father's death. Velu dies surrounded by his mourning people as Ajit is apprehended.

== Cast ==
- Kamal Haasan as Sakthivel "Velu" Naicker
  - Manikandan G. as Young Sakthivel "Velu" Naicker
- Saranya as Neela
- Janagaraj as Selvam
- Delhi Ganesh as Iyer
- Karthika as Charumati
  - Neena as young Charu (uncredited)
- Nizhalgal Ravi as Surya
- Nassar as ACP Patil
- Tinnu Anand as Ajit Kelkar
- Vijayan as Durai
- M. V. Vasudeva Rao as Hussain Bhai
- Tara as Shakila
- Kuyili (special appearance in "Nila Adhu Vanathumele")
- R. N. Sudarshan, R. N. K. Prasad and R. N. Jayagopal as the Reddy brothers
- Pradeep Shakthi as Inspector Kelkar
- A.R.S as Commissioner Raghavan
- Raja Krishnamurthy as Rathnavel Naicker, Velu's father
- Aditya V. Modi as Sakthivel

== Production ==
=== Development ===
The two years I studied in Bombay (1975–77), he [Varadarajan Mudaliar] was at his peak. People in the Matunga belt thought he was God. I used to wonder how anyone could treat a fellow human as God. I never understood why they would do this. It fascinated me. It was such a dramatic story, this man going from Tamil Nadu to Bombay and ruling the city. I outlined this thought to Kamal Haasan and he said fine. That's it. It was done. Decided.

— Mani Ratnam on his inspiration to make the film

In the mid-1980s, Muktha Srinivasan narrated a story inspired by the American film The Godfather (1972) to Sivaji Ganesan who agreed to act in the film. Amala and Kamal Haasan were also confirmed to act. However Ananthu, then an associate of Haasan, felt that it would be a Ganesan-focused film and not a Haasan film. The project was dropped. Haasan later told Srinivasan about the-then upcoming director Mani Ratnam. Ratnam had previously wanted to cast Haasan as the protagonist in his directorial debut, Pallavi Anu Pallavi (1983), but the collaboration could not materialise then as Haasan was committed to Raja Paarvai (1981) at that time.

Srinivasan came to Ratnam's house and gave him an envelope, which contained a cassette of the Hindi film Pagla Kahin Ka (1970). Ratnam, after watching the film, met Haasan and rejected the offer to remake the film. After Haasan asked him the kind of film he preferred to make, Ratnam suggested two stories: one was in the action genre similar to Dirty Harry (1971) and Beverly Hills Cop (1984), while the other was based on the life of the Bombay underworld don Varadarajan Mudaliar; the latter was finalised. Ratnam had earlier narrated this story, when it was only an idea, to producer R. C. Prakash, but it was not picked up then. Cinematography for Nayakan was handled by P. C. Sreeram, and editing by B. Lenin and V. T. Vijayan.

=== Casting ===
In September 1986, Haasan gave his schedule dates for the film to Srinivasan, and was paid ₹17.5 lakh (US$145,583 in 1987) (Note: The exchange rate in 1987 was 12.9658 Indian rupees (₹) per 1 US dollar (US$).) for playing Velu. Ratnam wanted Haasan to have as realistic a look as possible. He preferred Haasan in traditional Hindu attire. Haasan was initially hesitant regarding his look and wanted to sport a beard similar to that of his old-aged look in Sagara Sangamam (1983), as he felt it would not give away his jaw line, which would reveal that the character was portrayed by a younger person. Ratnam, in turn, did not want Haasan to sport a look similar to Sagara Sangamam or any of his other previous films. Haasan ultimately sported dentures to provide some weight around his jaw for Velu's old-age look.

Neela, the wife of Velu, was played by Saranya, who made her debut in the film. The character was created by Srinivasan to reduce the violent content and help the film cater to family audiences. Ratnam wanted a "new face" to portray Neela as he felt only then the character would have the required zest and gusto. Saranya sent her photograph to Ratnam to audition for the role. She was later cast after a successful screen test. Saranya's father was against her being cast, but she and her mother managed to convince him. Though Ratnam has stated that Saranya was "the first and only person we saw for the role", Debashree Roy claimed that she was approached, but refused as she considered that speaking in Tamil would be difficult for her. The dubbing voice for Saranya was provided by actress Uma Bharani. According to Suhasini, Ratnam considered her for the role of Velu's daughter Charumati; however, the role ultimately went to Karthika.

Ratnam believes that Nassar was suggested to him by Haasan, when Raghuvaran was being considered for the role of the assistant commissioner Patil. Raghuvaran declined as the script required him to cut his hair short. Nassar shot for six days and initially believed there was nothing special in his role. He later admitted his surprise of the reach of his character post-release. Although Tara was then known mainly for playing leading roles, she accepted the supporting role of Velu's sister Shakila. She later recalled, "I didn't know what to accept and what to reject. I just grabbed whatever was offered irrespective of the character. That was a mistake." Raja Krishnamoorthy (later known as Kitty), then the General Manager at Royal Enfield, quit to portray Velu's father, with Nayakan being his debut film. Haasan wanted Tinnu Anand for the role of Ajit, the son of Inspector Kelkar (Pradeep Shakthi). Anand was reluctant since he wanted to focus on his career as a director, but accepted after Haasan insisted.

=== Filming ===
Ratnam initially planned to complete the shooting in 60 days and 70 rolls of film. The initial budget was ₹60 lakh (US$500,000 in 1987), but time and cost overruns increased the budget to beyond ₹1 crore (US$830,000 in 1987). According to Srinivasan, principal photography commenced in November 1986 and the first schedule lasted for 10 days, but the scenes shot during this period were scrapped because Haasan disliked them, prompting script rewrites and causing shooting to be delayed; the rewritten script had more violence, and scenes taken from The Godfather and Once Upon a Time in America (1984). According to Ratnam, a three-day test shoot involving Haasan, unknown to Srinivasan, was done in December 1986 as the script was not yet complete. While the shots taken did not make the final cut, they helped to get the technical aspects of the film on the right track.

Ratnam said the first "real schedule" of Nayakan began in January 1987. 15 days of shooting took place in the slum areas of Dharavi. Using photographs taken there, the art director Thota Tharani created a set at Venus Studios in Madras. Thousands of junior artists were hired to recreate the atmosphere of the slum areas. Additionally, pigeons were brought for the same. Haasan helped in the make-up for the other actors in the film and asked Janagaraj and Delhi Ganesh to cut their hair so as to make their characters Selvam and Iyer in their old age scenes look convincing. One scene involved Velu telling Iyer, "Udamba paathukonga" (transl. Please take care of your health) and Ganesh spontaneously said "Naa poraen. Naa irundhu enna panna poraen. Nee nalla irukkanum, Naickerae" (transl. I'll take leave. What can I do by staying here? You should be well, Naicker); an impressed Haasan told Ratnam to retain the improvised dialogue. Haasan used attar perfume for the female cast.

Ratnam had marked around ₹12 lakh (US$100,000 in 1987) for the film's action sequences. To make the sequences slick and entertaining, cinematographer and stunt sequence director Jim Allen, who was known for his work stunt sequences in Sholay (1975) was chosen. But after three days, he was removed from the film as he charged ₹200,000 per day (US$16,000 in 1987) and Srinivasan could not afford the money. Haasan brought his own gun, sparing Ratnam the usage of a prop. In the scene where Haasan chases Kelkar, he uses his own bottle of sugar glass, which he had brought from the United States. The remaining portions were shot at Bombay (now Mumbai), including the portions involving Velu's childhood life in the city. The scene featuring Neela studying for her mathematics examination was suggested by Srinivasan. Velu's childhood portions before he moves to Bombay were canned in Old Mahabalipuram Road for one and a half days. This was also the last part of the principal photography.

The song "Naan Sirithal Deepavali" was shot at the spot where the Taj Club House is located today. The old building previously located at that spot was called the "Indian Express Building" by film industrialists as it was adjacent to the Old office of Indian Express. Thota Tharani converted the building's exterior into a brothel and used the opposite end of the building for Velu's house location. Nayakan was notable for using frame-within-the-frame technique of filmmaking. Ratnam and Haasan met Mudaliar in person, when Ratnam asked Mudaliar how he would foresee his own death; Mudaliar replied that it would be in a public riot amidst much panic and tension, this inspired the film's climax.

=== Post-production ===
When the film was completed and the first print was ready, it was three hours long. Although Ratnam and Haasan wanted Srinivasan to release the film uncut, he felt audiences would never see the entire film due to its length, so he requested Lenin to remove the scenes which he felt were unnecessary. The result, according to Srinivasan, "gave life to the movie, along with the theme music Thenpandi seemayilae."

== Themes ==
Haasan, Ratnam and Srinivasan have acknowledged to Nayakan being inspired by The Godfather in various scenes. These include Velu's killing of the Reddy brothers, the murder of Velu's son Surya, and Velu crying at Surya's corpse. One scene in the film involves Velu and Selvam tying their illicit cargo to large bags of salt attached to rubber inner tubes which they then dump into the sea; the cargo sinks from the weight of the salt, but when the salt dissolves the cargo bobs to the surface, by which time they have passed the customs officers. This was described by Lalitha Gopalan in her 2002 book Cinema of Interruptions as an homage to Once Upon a Time in America, a view that was shared by S. Shiva Kumar of The Hindu.

According to historian S. Theodore Baskaran, the film "tends to glorify violence and portrays the anti-social, smuggler-king in an approving and sympathetic way, modelling him on Robin Hood." Lalitha Gopalan notes that the film "attempts faithfully to re-create a historical period by carefully managing different aspects of the mise en scène. More than any other detail in the mise en scène, automobiles – different models of cars, jeeps, and vans – indicate the passage of time within the diegesis." According to a New Straits Times article, the film does not extol crime or violence; rather it narrates the story of a tragic character who rises from slums to untold riches and unbridled power. Ratnam has stated that the question asked by Velu's grandson, whether he is good or bad, "puts across the moral dilemma of the man in a nutshell".

== Music ==
The soundtrack was composed by Ilaiyaraaja, this being his 400th film soundtrack. Pulamaipithan wrote the lyrics for all the songs except "Nila Adhu Vanathumele", which Ilaiyaraaja himself wrote. Ilaiyaraaja composed the film score using ancient instruments, for the film. The song "Andhi Mazhai Megam" is set in the Carnatic raga Natabhairavi. "Nee Oru Kaadhal Sangeetham", set in the Hindustani raga Desh, is featured on both sides of the original LP record as the second track. The theme song "Thenpandi Cheemayile" plays for most of the film. "Nila Adhu Vanathumele" is set in the Carnatic Keeravani raga.

== Release ==
Nayakan was released on 21 October 1987, Diwali day. The Censor Board at Madras initially refused to permit the film's release as it was based on a living person. When Srinivasan appealed to the revising committee at Bombay, they said that they would permit the film's release if he produced a letter stating that it was not based on Mudaliar's life. Through writer Mathioli Shanmugam, Srinivasan met Mudaliar, who gave him a letter, after which the censor appellate board at Bombay permitted the release of the film. G. Venkateswaran of Sujatha Films bought the rights of the film after Srinivasan distributed the film. It was dubbed into Telugu as Nayakudu and into Hindi as Velu Nayakan. Despite the Hindi dub, it was later remade in Hindi as Dayavan (1988). In 2015, Nayakan was screened at the Habitat Film Festival.

=== Box office ===
Nayakan became a major success in many states. The film completed 214 days run in Tamil Nadu and completed 100 days in both Andhra Pradesh and Karnataka. The film ran for 25 weeks at Madras' Anand Theatre, 105 days at Grelan, 105 days at Udhayam, 175 days at Madurai Minipriya, 100 days at Salem, 85 days at Trichy's Kalaiyarangam, 100 days at Jupiter, 105 days at Coimbatore's Archana, 100 days at Bombay's Dinora and 224 at Bangalore's Pallavi. The Telugu dubbed version Nayakadu also completed 100 days of theatrical run.

=== Critical reception ===
Nayakan received critical acclaim. Varadarajan Mudaliar, who saw the film during a preview in Madras, expressed appreciation and said it "wasn't at all what I had expected". He added that it "made me realise that I could have been a better man". On 23 October 1987, N. Krishnaswamy of The Indian Express said, "[Nayakan] is a rare Tamil film. Sensitivity is its hallmark. Authenticity is its lifebreath. It has the stamp of nativity. It has class. Yet, it is not an Art film. It could be a watershed in Tamil cinema; an artistically made film that could make money as well." On 1 November, Ananda Vikatan stated that Haasan underplayed his role well and demonstrated his histrionics as a godfather in the film well, adding that the film stood out for its sets, taking, colour, richness and international quality camera work. The magazine gave the film one of its highest marks of 60.

Jayamanmadhan of Kalki lauded the film, saying it could be watched more than once. A 1988 review published in Bombay: The City Magazine described Haasan as having given a "powerhouse performance". Writing for India Today in 1989, Madhu Jain believed Nayakan deserved "a permanent place in the Indian cinema pantheon" after watching it at the 12th International Film Festival in Delhi. Balumani of Anna praised the acting of Haasan and Janagaraj, Ilaiyaraaja's background score and noted that the actors and technicians who participated in this film are completely united in the film and work with a combined activity that can be called a team spirit which can be seen in every frame of the film.

== Accolades ==
Award	Category	Recipients	Result	Ref.
35th National Film Awards	Best Actor	Kamal Haasan	Won	
35th National Film Awards	Best Cinematography	P. C. Sreeram	Won	
35th National Film Awards	Best Art Direction	Thota Tharani	Won	
8th Cinema Express Awards	Best Film – Tamil	Nayakan	Won	
8th Cinema Express Awards	Best Actor – Tamil	Kamal Haasan	Won	
8th Cinema Express Awards	Best Director – Tamil	Mani Ratnam	Won	

The film was India's official submission for the Academy Award for Best Foreign Language Film in 1987 at the 60th Academy Awards; however, it was not shortlisted among the final nominees.

== Legacy ==
Nayakan became a "landmark" of popular Indian cinema. As a part of its legacy, the film has been acclaimed for being a box-office success whilst being a critical success. English journalist Phil Hardy stated in his 1997 book The BFI Companion to Crime, "From the films that followed in the wake of The Godfather, the most interesting is Mani Rathnam's Nayakan (1987) starring [Kamal Haasan] in a fictional version of the Bombay gangster Varadarajan Mudaliar's life." In 2005, the magazine TIME included Nayakan in its list of "All-Time 100 Best Films". After the film was selected by TIME as one of the best, insiders of the magazine spoke about Ratnam's work in the film, saying "Ratnam has no such difficulty blending melodrama and music, violence and comedy, realism and delirium, into a two-and-a-half-hour demonstration that, when a gangster's miseries are mounting, the most natural solution is to sing in the rain." The tagline given to the film by TIME was "A terrific gangster epic in the Godfather style."

The film was also ranked 82nd in The Moving Arts Film Journal list of greatest films of all time. Nayakan was also included in NDTV's list "India's 20 greatest films" at no 13. In April 2013, on the centenary of Indian cinema, News18 included the film in its list of "100 greatest Indian films of all time". When questioned by Baradwaj Rangan if he would make a sequel to Nayakan, Ratnam said, "Never. When you finish a film, you're glad to be rid of it. You're happy you don't have to go back to that script again."

== In popular culture ==
The scenes and dialogues from the film have been parodied in various films, including Dumm Dumm Dumm (2001), and Chellamae (2004). When stand-up comedian and television anchor Bosskey launched a quirky play titled Dada in October 2005, he named the cast after famous characters in Tamil films. Accordingly, Anniyan (one of Vikram's character in the film), Badshah (Rajinikanth in Baashha) and Velu Naicker (Haasan's role in Nayakan) play the central characters of a family of brothers. Similarly, in the 2013 comedy film Onbadhule Guru, in which the characters were named after popular protagonists of Tamil cinema, a member of the supporting cast was christened Velu Naicker. According to the Telugu newspaper Eenadu, Rajinikanth, after being impressed with Nayakan, requested Ratnam to write a similar script, but the project never materialised; its similarities with Pa. Ranjith's script for Kabali (2016) made him accept to star in the latter film. The famous line in the film, "Neenga nallavara kettavara?" (Are you good or bad?) was used in "The Punch Song", a song from the film, Aaha Kalyanam (2014). The dialogue "Naalu peruku nalladhuna edhuvum thappilla" (Nothing is wrong if some people benefit from it) inspired a film of the same name. Delhi Ganesh reprises his role as Iyer in the 2022 film Vendhu Thanindhathu Kaadu.

== Controversy ==
In October 2012, coinciding with the 25th anniversary of Nayakan, Haasan published an article in The Hindu, titled "Of course Velu Nayakan doesn't dance", in which he recounted the making of the film. In the article, he described Srinivasan as stingy and being unhappy about shooting the film in Bombay, adding that films "were a business" for him and he "wasn't interested in films as art". In response, Srinivasan accused Haasan of defaming him, and wrote an article titled "Living in past glory" as a rejoinder, in which he accused Haasan of "distorting the facts" and undermining the contributions of others to the film. He also accused Haasan of interfering with the original screenplay by Ratnam to include sequences copied from The Godfather and Once Upon a Time in America. Srinivasan, however, concluded by writing that he was not against Haasan taking credit for the film's success, as long as it was not at his expense.

== See also ==
- List of submissions to the 60th Academy Awards for Best Foreign Language Film
- List of Indian submissions for the Academy Award for Best International Feature Film

== Bibliography ==
- Baskaran, S. Theodore (1996). The eye of the serpent: an introduction to Tamil cinema. Chennai: East West Books. OCLC 645890539.
- Gopalan, Lalitha (2002). Cinema of Interruptions: Action Genres in Contemporary Indian Cinema. British Film Institute.
- Hardy, Phil (1997). The BFI Companion to Crime. Continuum International Publishing Group. ISBN 978-0-304-33215-1.
- Joshi, Rajmohan (2006). Environmental Biotechnology. Isha Books. ISBN 81-8205-366-8.
- Rajadhyaksha, Ashish; Willemen, Paul (1998) [1994]. Encyclopaedia of Indian Cinema. British Film Institute and Oxford University Press. ISBN 0-19-563579-5.
- Rangan, Baradwaj (2012). Conversations with Mani Ratnam. India: Penguin Books. ISBN 978-0-670-08520-0.
- Sundararaman (2007) [2005]. Raga Chintamani: A Guide to Carnatic Ragas Through Tamil Film Music (2nd ed.). Pichhamal Chintamani. OCLC 295034757.
