= The Rise of the Krays =

2015 film

The Rise of the Krays is a 2015 low-budget biographical film about the Kray twins who terrorised London during the 1950s and 1960s. The film was funded by Terry Brown and David Sullivan and was in development before the production team learned of Legend, the larger-budgeted studio film scheduled for release the same year.

== Plot ==
The film focuses on the early life of the Krays before their downfall. In comparison with Legend it aims for a gritty authenticity with less glamorising, portraying The Twins as "horrible pieces of work".

== Cast ==
- Simon Cotton as Ronnie Kray
- Kevin Leslie as Reggie Kray
- Nicola Stapleton as Violet Kray
- James Hepburn as Charlie Richardson
- Phil Dunster as Dickie Baker
