= Karim Lala =

Indian mobster (1911–2002)

- کریم لالا
- Born: Abdul Karim Sher Khan; 1911; Kunar Province, Protectorate of Afghanistan, British Raj (present-day Afghanistan)
- Died: 19 February 2002 (aged 90–91); Mumbai, Maharashtra, India
- Other name: Bade Baba
- Occupations: Smuggling, narcotics, extortion, contract killing, illegal gambling, forced property evictions

Karim Lala (1911 – 19 February 2002), born Abdul Karim Sher Khan in the Samalam village of the Shegal District of Kunar Province, Afghanistan,was infamous as one of the three "mafia dons of Mumbai" in India for more than two decades from the sixties to the early eighties, the other two being Haji Mastan and Varadarajan Mudaliar.

== Background ==
Karim Lala was an Afghan Pashtun who emigrated from Kunar, Afghanistan to Mumbai (then Bombay) in the 1920s. His family settled in one of the most densely populated and impoverished Muslim communities of Bhendi Bazaar in South Mumbai. Starting as an ordinary worker in the Mumbai docks, he later joined a gang of ethnic Pashtuns (called Pathans in India) who worked as illegal recovery agents for Marwari and Gujarati money lenders, landlords, and businessmen. These money lenders and landlords employed the burly Pathans whose tall imposing size and intimidating demeanor made it easy to recover money from defaulting debtors and evicting tenants and owners from prime properties in the expensive south Mumbai area. For over two decades, he was the leader of the dreaded "Pathan Gang" that operated in impoverished and crime-infested Muslim ghettos of South Mumbai like Dongri, Nagpada, Bhendi Bazaar, and Mohammad Ali Road. The Pathan Gang was involved in operating illegal gambling (satta) and liquor dens, illegal money recovery, illegal land evictions, kidnapping, protection racket (hafta), contract killing (supari), distribution of Narcotic and Counterfeit money. Lala soon rose up the ranks to be the chief of the "Pathan Gang" that became notorious for contract killings, forced evictions from property, kidnapping, and extortion. The gang operated several "carrom clubs" that were a facade for illegal moneylending, gambling, and betting rackets. In the 1970s, Lala agreed to a pact with the other two ganglords, Haji Mastan and Varadarajan Mudaliar to divide Mumbai amongst themselves so that they could freely run their criminal activities without any conflict between each other. His two brothers Lal Gul Sher Khan & Rahim Khan were not directly involved with the Pathan Gang. Lal Gul Sher Khan's son Ahmed Khan and Rahim Khan's son Samad Khan later got involved. Samad was killed in 1984 and Rahim khan was shot dead in 1986. Ahmed Khan's son Asif Ahmed Khan was one among the later generations kept away from the Gang activities.

== Later life ==
Due to failing health during the late seventies, Lala gradually transferred the leadership of the Pathan gang to his nephew, Samad Khan son of Rahim Khan and then managed his hotel and transport business. Although Lala had several illegitimate businesses, his legitimate business included two hotels (Al Karim Hotel and New India Hotel) and a travel and passport agency called New India Tours and Travels. Lala remained friendly with his other counterparts - Haji Mastan and Varadarajan. He was also close to Shiv Sena supremo Bal Thackeray In 1980, Lala unsuccessfully tried to mediate peace between his nephew, Samad Khan and his rivals, Shabir Ibrahim Kaskar and Dawood Ibrahim. Lala died on 19 February 2002 at the age of 90 or 91.

== In popular culture ==
During his peak, Lala frequently invited several personalities from Bollywood to his daawats (parties) and Eid celebrations. Many characters from Bollywood movies closely resemble Karim Lala and his mannerisms and accent.

The 1973 movie, Zanjeer, the writer duo, Salim–Javed created a Pathan character called "Sher Khan" (played by actor Pran) whose mannerisms resembled Karim Lala.

Widely considered to be the inspiration for the magnanimous crime lord Abdel Khader Khan in the 2003 bestselling novel Shantaram, Karim shares personal and behavioral similarities with the fictional mafia don.

Malayalam movie Christian brothers (2011) had a similar character named Karim Lala played by R. Sarathkumar

Ajay Devgn played the character of Karim Lala in Sanjay Leela Bhansali's 2022 film Gangubai Kathiawadi.

He was portrayed by Nawab Shah by name of 'Pathan' in Amazon Prime series Bambai Meri Jaan

== See also ==
- Organised crime in India
