= Haji Mastan =

Indian mafia leader (1926–1994)

Haji Mastan Mirza
- Born: 1 March 1926; Ramanathapuram, Madras Presidency, British Raj (now in Tamil Nadu, India)
- Died: 25 June 1994 (aged 68); Mumbai, Maharashtra, India
- Political party: Bharatiya Minorities Suraksha Mahasangh
- Spouse(s): Safra Bai; Sona Mastan Mirza
- Children: 3

Haji Mastan (1 March 1926 – 25 June 1994) was an organised crime gang leader, originally from Tamil Nadu and based in Mumbai. He was one of the infamous trio of mafia gang leaders in Mumbai for over two decades from the 1960s to the early 1980s, along with Karim Lala leader of the Pathan gang in Mumbai and Chennai, and Varadarajan Mudaliar, another famous gang leader from Tamil Nadu in South India.

At his peak, Mastan operated a powerful smuggling syndicate in Mumbai and along the Gujarat coast and later diversified into film financing and real estate business.

Mastan was known to be a shrewd businessman and a cunning deal-maker. He is known to be the only Bombay don who ruled without sustaining an injury. His illegal smuggling business was not caught by the government or police during his lifetime. He always maintained friendly relations with the police and government officials and often promoted peace between rival gangs, and was good friends with Lala, Mudaliar, Hassan Patni and Shiv Sena supremo Bal Thackeray.

Very early in his career, Mastan realized the importance of being seen among famous personalities from politics and the film industry as a symbol of power. Therefore, he hobnobbed among the city's rich and famous and was frequently seen with Bollywood personalities at public functions.

Mastan was arguably the most influential mafia don of his time. He was also seen as a "style icon" by many due to his extravagant lifestyle including immaculate white clothes, white shoes, white Mercedes cars and expensive gold watches. Mastan flaunted an extravagant lifestyle to appear affluent and influential. His life served as an inspiration for the film Deewar (1975) and the character Sultan Mirza in the film Once Upon a Time in Mumbaai (2010).

== Early life ==
Haji Mastan was born in 1926 in a Tamil Muslim family in Panaikulam, in the Madras Presidency of British Raj (present-day Chennai, India). He lived in the coastal town of Cuddalore before migrating to Mumbai with his father at the age of 8.

Mastan started doing odd jobs as a small boy in the famous Crawford Market and soon joined the docks and started working long hours there. During his early twenties, due to the high import duty on gold, people started smuggling gold from overseas. Working in the docks made it easy for him to participate in smuggling and soon Mastan started his own business. Mastan began making a decent sum of money by diverting his sectors into this business. At an early age he also went on Hajj, after which he got the prefix Haji with his name.

== Adult life and death ==
Mastan joined hands with Sukkur Narayan Bakhia, a smuggler from Daman to control the illegal items smuggled into Mumbai and Daman from the countries in the Persian Gulf. Mastan purchased properties at various locations in South Mumbai including a sea-facing bungalow at Gopalrao Deshmukh Marg. He lived in a small room built on the roof of his bungalow.

Mastan ventured into film financing later in his life, providing producers in Mumbai with some much-needed funds. He eventually turned into a film producer himself. He also had business interests in real estate, electronic goods, and hotels. He owned several electronic shops in Musafir Khana near Crawford Market.

Mastan maintained good relations with the other gang leaders. When inter-gang rivalry in Mumbai began to increase, he called all the top gang leaders together and split Mumbai between the gangs so that they could operate without coming into conflict. In this the mafia queen, Jenabai Daruwali helped him. Earlier Jenabai was known as Chavalvali, as she was doing business of selling ration in black market. But as she was ambitious, she developed contacts with the then liquor producer and seller, Varadarajan Mudliar alias Varda Bhai. After this, she came to be known as Jenabai Daruwali. Jenabai had good relations with Mastan, the Dawood Ibrahim family, and Karim Lala Pathan. So with the consent of Mastan she arranged a meeting of all rivals under one roof of Mastan's pedder road bungalow called Batul Suroor.

Later in life, Mastan did not take a direct role in running his gang, but instead, he depended on right-hand men like Lala and Mudaliar to carry out his smuggling operations and intimidate rivals and debtors. Mastan was especially close to Mudaliar as they were both from Tamil Nadu. When Mudaliar died, Mastan hired a private chartered plane to bring his body to Mumbai for the final rites.

During the Emergency, he was imprisoned. Whilst in prison, he was influenced by the ideals of politician Jayaprakash Narayan and also began learning Hindi.

After his release from prison, Mastan entered politics and formed a political party in 1980-81, which was named Dalit Muslim Surakhsha Maha Sangh in 1985, and later renamed as Bharatiya Minorities Suraksha Mahasangh, currently led by Sundar Shaekhar.

Haji Mastan Mirza died of cardiac arrest in Mumbai on 25 June 1994.
