= Abhimanyu (1991 film) =

- DVD Cover
- Directed by: Priyadarshan
- Written by: T. Damodaran
- Produced by: V. B. K. Menon
- Starring: Mohanlal; Geetha
- Cinematography: Jeeva
- Edited by: N. Gopalakrishnan
- Music by: Songs: Raveendran; Background Score: Johnson
- Production company: Anugraha Cine Arts
- Distributed by: Anugraha Release
- Release date: 21 December 1991
- Country: India
- Language: Malayalam
- Budget: ₹ 35 lakhs
- Box office: ₹ 85 lakhs(25 days)

Abhimanyu is a 1991 Indian Malayalam-language crime drama film directed by Priyadarshan and written by T. Damodaran. It stars Mohanlal in title role. The plot revolves around the Bombay (now Mumbai) underworld and the transformation of an innocent guy into a crime boss in the city. The movie is loosely based on the life of Bada Rajan. The tagline of the movie is Crime Never Pays.

The Film Got A Certificate from Censorboard.The film was a superhit at the box office. The film is noted for its screenplay, direction and background score. Mohanlal won the Kerala State Film Award for Best Actor. Its Tamil dubbed version Arasan was also a superhit. The movie was later dubbed and released in Hindi as Satyaghath - Crime Never Pays. It was unofficially remade in Tamil as Thalai Nagaram (2006), which was remade in Telugu as Nagaram (2008) and in Kannada as Devru (2009). Art direction was by Thotta Tharani.

== Plot ==
Harikrishnan is an immigrant in Mumbai, who, like many thousands of immigrants, is struggling to make ends meet. He shares a room with a group of Malayali guys, who have their personal problems and difficulties. The film begins with Harikrishnan witnessing the murder of a journalist, and being asked by police to appear at an identification parade, which he does. Hari and his friends stay in a room at Kamathipura, which also houses the largest red lighted area in India. He accidentally meets Kiran, a Telugu girl in the brothel, for whom he develops feelings. In a short attempt to make money, Hari and his friends start making local hooch which is then supplied by their friend Manikandan, who is a taxi driver. One of the friends Shekhar, falls in love with Mani's sister Radha without the knowledge of anyone else.

One fine morning, Mudaliar, a Tamil don who ruled the streets is shot dead by Abbas Ali, his own henchman who shifted his loyalty to Amar Bakia, another cold blooded don. With the death of Mudaliar, Amar Bakia becomes the undisputed don of the city, and Abbas Ali his lieutenant. Abbas, after coming to know about the small scale smuggling activities of Hari and his gang, threatens him and asks him to come and meet him on the day of Vinayak Chathurthi and pay him a large amount as fine.

In midst of the celebration, Hari enters the house of Abbas Ali and shoots him down, inviting the enmity of Amar Bakhia. Chotta Shankar, a local goon belonging to Bakhia gang, attacks Hari, but Hari beats them up mercilessly. He is soon arrested by the police and beaten up in the cell by the inspector and Bakhia in an attempt to make him confess for the murder of Abbas. Assuming that he is dead, they throw him into the street. He is discovered alive and saved by the lady owner of the brothel and she along with Kiran takes care of him. With this incident, Hari becomes the local leader and within a short span Chotta and others join his gang. Hari thus becomes Hari Anna, who also becomes a negotiator in land disputes, financial matters and local business stiffs.

Amar Bakhia is now in serious efforts to end the gang of Hari, but Hari on the other hand, is getting stronger day by day. Shekhar gets a job at a Marwari business group and ditches Radha for a rich woman which leaves her heartbroken. Radha calls him in a telephone booth one night and begs Shekhar not to leave her but he refuses to listen. Hari overhears the call and comforts her. The next day, Hari and the gang confront him. Radha, who is pregnant by then, commits suicide. Hari beats up Shekhar and confronts him hard. Mani, shocked by this incident, is unaware of Shekhar's involvement with his sister and indirect cause of her suicide. Hari decides to marry Kiran and with the help of his friends plan to start up a new life outside Mumbai. Amar Bakhia orchestrates attacks on Hari and his gang, leaving many of Hari's friends dead. Chotta betrays Hari and stabs him. Hari plots revenge and executes those responsible including Chotta and Amar, and prepares to escape with Kiran.

Meanwhile, Mani gets a letter written by his sister to Hari, which he misunderstands as it's Hari who is responsible for his sister's death. Mani informs the police about Hari's plan to leave Mumbai. While parting, Hari informs Mani about Shekhar and expresses regret for not being able to save her. On realizing the truth, Mani reveals the ambush plans and asks Hari to escape before police reaches the spot. But it is too late by then, as police surround him and shoot him down. The film ends sad as Hari dies in Kiran's arms with her crying and screaming his name.

== Cast ==
- Mohanlal as Harikrishnan (Hari Anna), a welder turned crime boss
- Geetha as Kiran, Hari's girlfriend
- Renuka as Savithri, Hari's former girlfriend
- Shankar as Shekhar, Hari's friend
- Mahesh Anand as Amar Bakhia, the main antagonist and powerful underworld don of Bombay
- Rami Reddy as Abbas Ali, Amar Bakia's lieutenant
- Cochin Haneefa as Chotta Shankar, Hari's enemy turned ally who turns back into enemy
- Jagadish as Manikandan (Mani), Hari's friend
- Poornam Viswanathan as Mudaliar
- K. B. Ganesh Kumar as Gopi, Hari's henchman
- Sukumari as Kalyani, Mani's and Radha's mother
- Nandu
- Manjula Vijayakumar as Madam of the brothel
- Suchitra Murali as Radha, Mani's younger sister and Shekar's ex-girlfriend
- Rajesh as Commissioner Duraiswamy

== Box office ==
The film collected a gross of ₹85 lakhs from 25 centres when it completed 25 days run, as per Mathrubhumi daily, which was a huge at that time and finally the film declared as a superhit at box office .

== Music ==
The film score was composed by Johnson while the original songs featured in the film were by composed by Raveendran and lyrics penned by Kaithapram Damodaran Namboothiri. This consisted of 5 songs:

Song	Singer(s)	Duration	Other notes
"Classical bit"	K. S. Chithra	02:40	
"Ganapathi"	M. G. Sreekumar	05:00	Raagam: Madhyamavati
"Kandu Njan"	M. G. Sreekumar	04:47	Raagam: Reetigowla
"Mamala Mele"	M. G. Sreekumar, K. S. Chithra	04:44	
"Ramayanakatte"	M. G. Sreekumar, K. S. Chithra	05:00	Raagam: Natabhairavi

== Awards ==
Kerala State Film Awards

- Best Actor - Mohanlal
- Best Editor - N. Gopalakrishnan
- Best Sound Editor - Deepan Chetterji
