= Yakub Memon =

Convicted terrorist (1962–2015)

- Born: Yakub Abdul Razzaq Memon; 30 July 1962; Bombay, Maharashtra, India
- Died: 30 July 2015 (aged 53); Nagpur Central Jail, Maharashtra, India
- Cause of death: Execution by hanging
- Resting place: Bada Qabrastan Mumbai
- Occupation: Terrorist
- Known for: 1993 Bombay bombings
- Relatives: Yusuf Memon (brother); Tiger Memon (brother)
- Status: Executed at 06:35 IST on 30 July 2015
- Conviction: Criminal conspiracy (27 July 2007)
- Penalty: Death

Details
- Country: India
- Location: Mumbai
- Killed: 257
- Injured: 654
- Date apprehended: 5 August 1994
- Imprisoned at: Nagpur Central Jail

Yakub Abdul Razzaq Memon (30 July 1962 – 30 July 2015) was an Indian gangster and a convicted terrorist apprehended over his financial and criminal involvements in the 1993 Bombay bombings, and the brother of one of the prime suspects in the bombings, Tiger Memon. After his appeals and petitions for clemency were all rejected, he was executed at Nagpur Central Jail on 30 July 2015. Memon financially assisted his brother Tiger Memon and Dawood Ibrahim in planning and executing the bombings. Memon handled Tiger's funds, funded the training of 15 youths who were sent to a secret location to learn handling arms and ammunition, purchased the vehicles used in the bombings, and stockpiled weapons.

== Early history ==
Yakub Memon was born into a Memon family on 30 July 1962 in Mumbai and grew up in the Byculla neighborhood where he attended Antonio D'Souza High School. He completed a master's degree in Commerce at the Burhani College of Commerce and Arts. In 1986, Memon enrolled in the Institute of Chartered Accountants of India and completed studies as a chartered accountant in 1990.

In 1991, Memon founded the chartered accountancy firm 'Mehta & Memon Associates' with his childhood friend Chetan Mehta. The following year, they parted ways, and he founded another accountancy firm 'AR & Sons'. Named after his father, it was successful, and Memon won the "Best Chartered Accountant of the Year" award from the Memon community of Mumbai. He also formed the export company 'Tijarath International' to export meat products to the Persian Gulf region and Middle East.

== 1993 Bombay bombings ==
=== Part in the bombings ===
Memon financially assisted his brother Tiger Memon and Dawood Ibrahim in planning and executing the bombings. Memon handled Tiger's funds, funded the training of 15 youths who were sent to a secret location to learn handling arms and ammunition, purchased the vehicles used in the bombings, and stockpiled weapons.

=== Arrest ===
The Indian Central Bureau of Investigation claims that Memon was captured at New Delhi railway station on 5 August 1994. However, Memon claims that he surrendered to police in Nepal on the 28 July 1994. Memon was captured with a briefcase which contained a recording of a conversation he had in Karachi.

=== Trial ===
Justice P. D. Kode, in a Terrorist and Disruptive Activities (Prevention) Act (TADA) court, found Memon guilty of the following offences on 27 July 2007:

Crime	Sentence
Criminal conspiracy to carry out terrorist act and disruptive activities, and murder	Death
Aiding and abetting and facilitating in a terrorist act	Life imprisonment
Illegal possession and transportation of arms and ammunition	Rigorous imprisonment for 14 years
Possessing explosives with intent to endanger lives	Rigorous imprisonment for 10 years

=== Subsequent appeals and petitions ===
Memon had filed an appeal before the Supreme Court of India under Section 19 of the TADA Act and State of Maharashtra filed a reference before the court for the confirmation of Memon's death sentence. On 21 March 2013, the Supreme Court confirmed Memon's conviction and death sentence for conspiracy through financing the attacks. The court held that Memon's role was limited not only to the extent of correspondence between the masterminds and all other accused, but he was also entrusted with task of handling the explosive bags and for their safe keeping, which is stated in the confessional statements of various co-accused persons. It also held that Memon was actively involved in hawala transactions for the purpose of facilitating the blasts. The judges called him the "mastermind" and "driving force" behind the bombings. Memon has consistently claimed innocence.

Memon then filed a Review Petition seeking review of Supreme Court's judgment confirming his death sentence. On 30 July 2013, Supreme Court bench headed by Chief Justice P. Sathasivam and Justice B.S. Chauhan rejected Memon's application for oral hearing and dismissed his review petition by circulation. Memon then filed a Writ Petition before the Supreme Court as the issue of oral hearing of review petitions against death sentences was being heard by the Supreme Court.

On 6 August 2013, Memon's brother Suleman filed a mercy petition before the President of India. However, Indian President Pranab Mukherjee rejected Memon's petition for clemency on 11 April 2014.

On 1 June 2014, Justices J. Khehar and C. Nagappan imposed a stay of execution while a plea from Memon, that review of death penalties should be heard in an open court rather than in chambers, was heard by a constitution bench of the Supreme Court which was then extended in December 2014. On 24 March 2015, open court hearing began on Memon's review petition. Senior Counsel Jaspal Singh represented Memon. On 9 April 2015, Supreme Court dismissed Memon's review petition.

On 30 April 2015, Maharashtra Government issued a death warrant setting 30 July 2015 as the date for Memon's execution. Memon then filed a curative petition before the Supreme Court on 22 May 2015, which was rejected on 21 July 2015. Meanwhile, Memon then filed a mercy petition with the Governor of Maharashtra and then filed a Writ before the Supreme Court of India for a stay on his execution till the mercy petition is decided. He claimed that the death warrant was illegal, as it had been issued before he had exhausted all his legal avenues of appeal. The death sentence given to Yakub Memon has been criticized by a few eminent personalities, including Salman Khan, Research and Analysis Wing officer B. Raman, former Supreme Court judge Justice H. S. Bedi, Former Supreme Court judge Markandey Katju, Hussain Zaidi, Ram Jethmalani, Asaduddin Owaisi, R. Jagannathan and a few Muslim bodies, who asked for implementation of the Srikrishna Commission report. On 26 July 2015, a petition was handed over by some eminent personalities and political leaders to President Mukherjee to reconsider Memon's mercy plea.

On 28 July 2015, Memon filed a fresh writ petition before the Supreme Court challenging the order passed in the curative petition contending that the required quorum was not present based on the interpretation of the Supreme Court Rules. After the hearing, the two judges disagreed on the issue and passed an order requesting the Chief Justice of India (CJI) to urgently constitute a larger bench. On 29 July, the Supreme Court rejected his petition. Memon also submitted a petition for clemency to Maharashtra Governor C. Vidyasagar Rao and a fresh petition to President Mukherjee, both of which were rejected. As a final resort Memon's lawyers filed a plea for 14-day stay of execution with Supreme Court Chief Justice citing that there needs to be 14-day period between a mercy plea rejected by president and the execution. A three-judge bench convened at 2:30 IST to hear the arguments. After hearing the arguments the bench upheld the execution, rejecting Memon's lawyers arguments.

=== Imprisonment ===
Memon was originally held at Yerwada Central Jail, and was transferred to Nagpur Central Jail in August 2007. While in prison, he studied at Indira Gandhi National Open University and earned two master's degrees: the first, in 2013, in English literature and the second degree, in 2014, in political science.

=== Execution ===
Memon was executed at Nagpur Central Jail at around 6:30 a.m. IST on 30 July 2015, his 53rd birthday. He had been woken up at 4:00 a.m., permitted to take a warm bath, and was provided with a fresh set of clothing. He was allowed to read the Quran and pray Salah, eat a last meal of his choice, have a final phone call with his daughter as per his last wish, and he underwent a final medical examination before the execution. A Pune police constable who had previously hanged Ajmal Kasab carried out the execution. He became the 24th person and the first convict in 31 years to be hanged at Nagpur Central Jail since 1947.

His execution set off a debate on capital punishment in India, with many commentators and activists calling for its abolition.

== In media ==
Memon was portrayed by actor/director Imtiaz Ali in Anurag Kashyap's film Black Friday. The film includes some of the actual footage of Yakub Memon's interview given to Madhu Trehan of Newstrack, where he states that the conspiracy was orchestrated by his brother Tiger Memon and his underworld associates.
