= Digi Yatra =

Indian aviation check-in system based on facial recognition technology

- Slogan: A New Digital Experience for Air Travellers
- Owner: Digi Yatra Foundation (DYF)
- Country: India
- Launched: 1 December 2022; 3 years ago At Delhi, Varanasi, and Bengaluru Airports
- Status: Active
- Website: https://digiyatrafoundation.com/

Digi Yatra (lit. 'Digital Journey') is an industry-led digital initiative coordinated by the Ministry of Civil Aviation in India. Digi Yatra utilizes facial recognition to verify passenger identities at various checkpoints, such as check-in, security, and boarding gates, without the need for physical documents. Specific queues and check-ins have been set up in fifteen airports for passengers who have registered through the Digi Yatra app. Another 13 airports are expected to be launched in April 2024. It aims to provide a paperless travel experience to air passengers.

== Ownership ==
Digi Yatra was launched by the "Digi Yatra Foundation", which is a private not-for-profit company owned by the Airports Authority of India (26%) and 5 other private airports - Hyderabad, Cochin, Bangalore, Mumbai and Delhi all having a 14.8% stake each. Being a private company, it is not answerable to RTI requests under the Right to Information Act, 2005.

== History ==
The app was developed by Hyderabad-based startup Dataevolve Solutions. The company was selected through the national start-up challenge conducted by NITI Aayog under Atal Innovation Mission (AIM).

It was launched on 1 December 2022 in its first phase in Bangalore, Varanasi and Delhi. In April 2023, it was expanded to Vijayawada, Kolkata, Hyderabad, and Pune airports. In June 2023, Delhi Airport’s Terminal 3 (T3), announced that passengers traveling from T3 could use Digi Yatra from the airport premises without using the Digi Yatra mobile application. In the same month, Digi Yatra announced that their service reached one million users. In August 2023, Ahmedabad's Sardar Vallabhbhai Patel International Airport implemented the Digi Yatra system.

During the 2024 CrowdStrike incident, DigiYatra and most other airport and airline digital infrastructure at the Delhi Airport were unusable.

== Privacy concerns and controversies ==
Western media and affiliates have been highlighting issues with Digi Yatra. According to a January 2024 survey, 29% of passengers in the Digi Yatra biometric system were signed up without their knowledge. Security personnel and staff at Indian airports have allegedly been capturing the face biometrics of passengers and non-consensually enrolling them in Digi Yatra, without even informing the passenger what they are doing it for. Another 15% of passengers only signed up for the app because they could not find the regular gate.

In April 2024, the app stopped working without passengers being given any prior notice. The app remained down for several days, and the foundation issued a statement about it being down for infrastructure upgrades. They had to migrate users to a new app, and in process, completely bricked the old app to ensure everyone moved to the newer version. A major difference between the two apps was that the new app was published on Google Play Store under a domain controlled by the foundation, while the previous app was published under a domain owned by Data Evolve, the company that initially developed the app. Avinash Kommireddi, the CEO of Dataevolve solutions, had also been arrested for siphoning ₹36.5 crores of funds from Andhra Pradesh Police in an e-challan scam just a few months before this change.

Digi Yatra also forces users to sign up using Aadhaar. They have stated that there are plans to integrate other ID proofs, but there has been no progress on this as of December 2024.

The Internet Freedom Foundation has raised concerns about the "privacy, surveillance, exclusion errors and lack of institutional accountability and transparency" with Digi Yatra. Privacy experts have said that Digi Yatra suffers from a poor governance structure and the lack of information and disclosures, despite it being a partly government-run service, have made it unreliable. In 2026, in response to a PIL filed in Kerala alleging commercial use of personal data by Digi Yatra, the Kerala HC is seeking cooperation through a data protection board as an adjudicatory body established under compliance with the Digital Personal Data Protection Act, 2023 and Digital Personal Data Protection Rules, 2025.
