= Nandakumar Chaugule =

Indian police officer

Nandkumar Chaugule
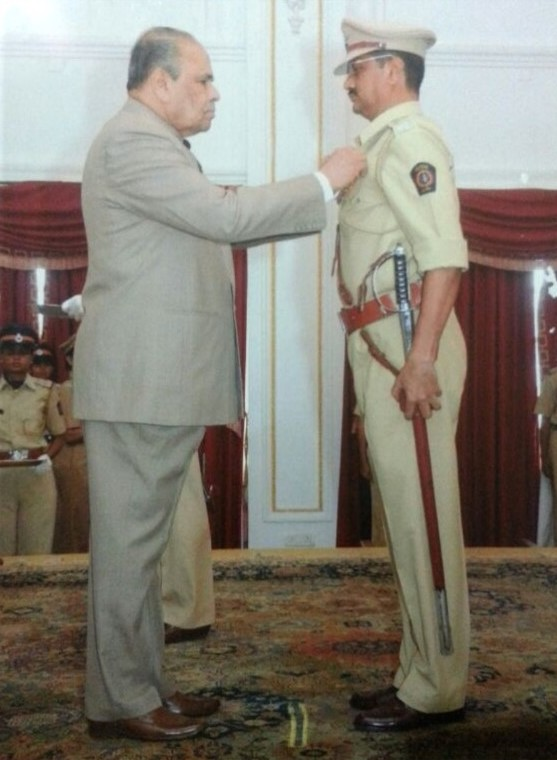
- Nandkumar Chaugule receiving President’s Police Medal by Shri K Shankarnarayan-Hon Governor, for Meritorious Service in 2008
- Born: Nandkumar Chaugule; 14 October 1955 (age 70); Mumbai, Maharashtra, India
- Occupation: ex-Deputy Commissioner of Police

Nandakumar Chaugule (born 14 October 1955) is an ex-Deputy Commissioner of Police, Maharashtra, India. He has served 38 years in the police service and has received the President's Medal for Meritorious Service on 24 January 2010. During the 1993 Bombay bombings, he was in charge of the bomb detection and disposal squad and played a vital role in promoting safety and the capture of the accused within 24 hours; his work is described in the book Black Friday: The True Story of the Bombay Bomb Blasts by Hussain Zaidi. He was played by Zakir Hussain as Inspector NandKumar Chougale in the film Black Friday (2007).

== Early life ==
Post completion of a two-year training course at Police Training College, Nasik, Chaugule was selected for the post of Sub-Inspector of Police in October 1975.

== Career ==
He has served his services in several regions across Mumbai Kherwadi, Sahar Airport, Thane, Oshiwara, Navi Mumbai and Nashik. Chaugule has worked across several sections such as State CID (Int), M.S. Mumbai, Bomb Detection and Disposal Squad, Airport Security and Administration and Traffic Branch.

His exceptional cases include:

- Detention of drug dealer Amir Khan under MPDA
- Arresting armed Tamil terrorist Elango Natrajah of LTTE
- In charge of the Bomb Detection and Disposal Squad, he played a crucial role during the 1993 bomb blast including recovering lethal weapons, vital evidence from the 12 blast sites which were key in arrests of the accused within 24 hours.
- One of the biggest RDX hauls ever seized in the country of over 1000 kg of RDX
- Several other cases of arrests, bomb blasts and capture of terrorists.

He retired in 2013 and now lives in Mumbai.
