= Tiger Memon =

Indian criminal

- Tiger Memon
- Born: Ibrahim Mushtaq Abdul Razzaq Memon; 24 November 1960 (age 65); Bombay, Maharashtra, India
- Criminal status: Fugitive
- Spouse: Shabana Ibrahim Memon
- Children: 8
- Relatives: Yusuf Memon (brother); Yakub Memon (brother)

Ibrahim Mushtaq Abdul Razzaq Memon (born 24 November 1960), better known by the nickname Tiger Memon, is a gangster and terrorist, reputed to be one of the masterminds behind the 1993 Mumbai bombings. He is wanted by Interpol and the Central Bureau of Investigation (CBI). He is a former member of D-Company, a gang led by Dawood Ibrahim. He got the nickname Tiger after helping a petty drugs and weapons smuggler to evade the crime branch of Mumbai Police by driving his car over 100km/h on one-way roads.

He has been sanctioned under the Foreign Narcotics Kingpin Designation Act in the Specially Designated Nationals and Blocked Persons List by the United States Department of the Treasury's Office of Foreign Assets Control.

== 1993 Bombay bombings ==
Memon's role as the prime accused in the blasts was confirmed by a Special Court set up under the terms of the Terrorist and Disruptive Activities (Prevention) Act after the conviction of the others accused in the case.

On 15 September 2014, the special TADA court, hearing the long-drawn-out case around the 1993 Bombay bombings, convicted four members of the Memon family: Yakub, Essa, Rubina and Yusuf. Three other members of the family—Suleiman, Hanifa and Rahil—were acquitted because the judge gave them benefit of doubt. The four convicted Memons have been held guilty on charges of conspiring and abetting acts of terror. They face jail terms ranging from a minimum of five years to life imprisonment. Yakub Memon, the younger brother of prime accused Tiger Memon, had been charged for possession of unauthorised arms and was executed by hanging on 30 July 2015 in Nagpur jail.

On 26 June 2020, his other brother Yusuf Memon died while imprisoned at the Nashik Central Jail. As of 2024, Memon is still at large; one of his addresses is listed in Karachi by the US Treasury, where Dawood Ibrahim is also based.

== In popular culture ==
The activities of Tiger Memon were a major part of Anurag Kashyap's film Black Friday (2004), which is based on the book of Hussain Zaidi named Black Friday: The True Story of the Bombay Bomb Blasts about the 1993 Bombay Bombings. Memon was played by Bollywood actor Pavan Malhotra.

== See also ==
- List of fugitives from justice who disappeared
