= 1993 Bowbazar bombing =

Bomb explosion in Kolkata, India

The Bowbazar bomb blast was an explosion which occurred in the central business district of Bowbazar, Calcutta, India on the night of 16 March 1993. In total, it claimed the lives of 45 people.

== Explosion ==
In 1993, Mohammed Rashid Khan ran gambling establishments in the Bowbazar area and had a workshop above his office where he made small bombs. He began stockpiling explosives. Preparations were made secretly until, on the night of 16 March, the entire stockpile blew up accidentally. If the blast had occurred in the daytime, the death toll would have been much higher.

== Trial and punishment ==
Khan and five others were sentenced to life imprisonment in 2001 by the Calcutta High Court under the Terrorist And Disruptive (Prevention) Act (TADA).

== See also ==
- 1993 Bombay Bombings
- 2002 attack on American cultural centre in Kolkata
