= Azam Ghauri =

- Died: 6 April 2000; Jagityal
- Organization(s): People's War Group (PWG); Tanzim Islahul Muslimeen(TIM); Lashkar-e-Taiba; Indian Muslim Mohammadi Mujahideen (IMMM)

Azam Ghauri was a member of the proscribed Islamist group Lashkar-e-Taiba. He was wanted for various crimes including the 1993 serial bomb blasts.

== History ==
In 1990, Azam Ghauri was part of People's War Group. He was seriously injured during an attack that he carried out in Warangal. To escape arrest he fled Andhra Pradesh and went to Pakistan and joined Lashkar-e-Toiba. He received training at the hands of Taliban in Afghanistan.

In 1992, he returned to India and was involved in the murder of G Krishna Prasad, an Additional Superintendent of Police in Hyderabad.

In 1993 he was part of the criminal group that carried out the 1993 serial bomb blasts in Bombay which caused over 250 fatalities and 700 injuries. He fled again to Pakistan to escape prosecution and received further weapons training.

Ghauri infiltrated back into India and came to Hyderabad and started recruiting Muslim youths for disruptive activities in India and founded Indian Muslim Mohammadi Mujahideen outfit with the stated objective "to eradicate western culture from India".

On 6 April 2000 he was killed by Hyderabad Police in a police shoot out, after he pulled out a 7.65 mm Mauser pistol to fire at policemen.

Police records show Ghauri was involved in as many as 60 crimes such as extortion, killings and theft.

== See also ==
- Islamic fundamentalism
- Jihadism
- Islamic terrorism
- Revolutionary communism
