= Deepak Salvi =

Advocate Deepak Salvi (D N Salvi) is a criminal lawyer in the High Court of Bombay. The State of Maharashtra in 2018 appointed him as a Retainer Counsel and Special Legal Advisor on matters relating to Reservation of Scheduled Casts, Scheduled Tribes and Socially and Educationally Backward Classes of people. He is a member of the PCPNDT committee of the State of Maharashtra as their Legal Expert. He was appointed as the Retainer Counsel for the Central Bureau of Investigation in 2009. He was appointed by the CBI as a special prosecutor in the cases of the 1993 Bombay bomb blasts cases, Jalgaon murder case, Sohrabuddin Sheikh fake encounter case. He is known for his contribution in the Adarsh Society Scam Case in helping the Bombay High Court monitor the probe. The High Court of Bombay has appointed him as amicus curiae in several criminal law cases.
