= Black Friday (2004 film) =

2004 film by Anurag Kashyap

- Theatrical release poster
- Directed by: Anurag Kashyap
- Written by: Anurag Kashyap
- Based on: Black Friday: The True Story of the Bombay Bomb Blasts by Hussain Zaidi
- Produced by: Arindam Mitra
- Starring: Pawan Malhotra; Kay Kay Menon; Aditya Srivastava; Imtiaz Ali; Pratima Kazmi; Zakir Hussain
- Cinematography: Natarajan Subramaniam
- Edited by: Aarti Bajaj
- Music by: Indian Ocean
- Production companies: Mid Day Multimedia Limited; Big Bang Pictures; Mirror Films
- Distributed by: Jhamu Sughand; Adlabs
- Release dates: 13 August 2004 (Locarno); 9 February 2007 (India)
- Running time: 162 minutes
- Country: India
- Language: Hindi
- Budget: ₹6.5 crore
- Box office: ₹8 crore

Black Friday is a 2004 Indian Hindi-language crime drama film written and directed by Anurag Kashyap. Based on Black Friday: The True Story of the Bombay Bomb Blasts, a book by Hussain Zaidi about the 1993 Bombay bombings, it chronicles the events that led to the blasts and the subsequent police investigation. Produced by Arindam Mitra of Mid-Day, the film stars Pawan Malhotra, Kay Kay Menon, Aditya Srivastava, Kishor Kadam and Zakir Hussain.

Mitra, director of operations for Mid Day, approached Kashyap with the book and wanted him to write a television series based on it for the Aaj Tak TV news channel. Kashyap wrote the script in episodes for the six-part miniseries but later felt a feature film was more appropriate for the topic. Aaj Tak backed away from the project, and it was shelved. Kashyap then suggested to the director Aditya Bhattacharya that he make it into a film. When Kashyap told him he felt there was a film to be made about the event, Bhattacharya gave it to him to direct. The film's soundtrack album and the background score were composed by the band Indian Ocean, while the lyrics were written by Piyush Mishra. Natarajan Subramaniam served as the director of photography, while Aarti Bajaj was its editor.

Black Friday premiered at the 2004 Locarno International Film Festival and was supposed to be released the same year in India. However, after a petition filed by a group accused of the 1993 bomb blasts challenging the film's release, the Bombay High Court issued a stay. Until judgement was delivered on the case, it could not be released. On 9 February 2007, after the verdict was announced, the Supreme Court of India allowed its release. The film received critical acclaim. It won the Grand Jury Prize at the Indian Film Festival of Los Angeles and was a nominee for the Golden Leopard award at the Locarno International Film Festival. Made on a production budget of ₹6.5 crore (US$670,000), it grossed a total of ₹8 crore (US$830,000) at the box office.

== Plot ==
On 9 March 1993, a low-level criminal named Gul Mohammed is detained at the Nav Pada police station in Bombay. During his interrogation, he confesses to an active, large-scale conspiracy to detonate explosives at major commercial and strategic locations across the city. The local police dismiss his statement as a desperate bluff. Three days later, on 12 March 1993, a devastating series of coordinated explosions tears through the metropolis, resulting in 257 fatalities and leaving nearly 1,400 individuals injured. Subsequent forensic investigations reveal that the highly volatile explosive RDX was utilized, having been smuggled into the country through maritime routes with the active collusion of corrupt customs officials and border police.

The primary architect of the tragedy is Tiger Memon, a powerful underworld don whose Mumbai offices and businesses were incinerated during the preceding communal riots. Deeply affected by the targeted persecution of Muslim minorities during the unrest, Memon attends a clandestine summit of South Asian underworld syndicates in Dubai to plan a retaliatory strike. Memon argues that a massive, synchronized attack directly targeting the financial capital of Bombay will send the most definitive and devastating message of retribution.

The breakthrough in the investigation occurs on 14 March 1993, when the police arrest Asgar Muqadam, Memon's personal secretary. Under intense physical coercion, Muqadam yields critical details regarding the logistics and personnel involved in the blasts, initiating a full-scale police inquiry. Deputy Commissioner of Police Rakesh Maria is officially appointed to lead the dedicated task force. The local accomplices and foot soldiers, recruited under the guise of religious duty, find themselves abruptly abandoned. Forced into hiding across India, they lead a paranoid existence of anonymity as Maria's team systematically tracks them down. Their vulnerability worsens upon discovering that their passports have been deliberately destroyed on Memon’s orders to prevent them from fleeing the country.

On 10 May 1993, the police apprehend Badshah Khan, one of Memon's trusted henchmen who had fled Bombay. While in hiding, Khan and his associates realize that the underworld high command has blatantly refused to grant them financial aid, safe passage, or asylum. Disillusioned by the betrayal of his handlers, exhausted by a life on the run, and recognizing the lack of moral justification for the mass casualty attack, Khan agrees to cooperate with the authorities and becomes a state witness.

On 4 November 1993, the Mumbai Police file a comprehensive charge sheet naming 189 accused individuals, after which the Central Bureau of Investigation formally takes over the prosecution. The geopolitical dynamics shift on 5 August 1994, when Tiger’s brother, Yakub Memon, willingly surrenders to the Indian authorities. In a candid interview broadcast on national television via the Newstrack program, Yaqub publicly denounces the attacks and explicitly names his brother, Tiger Memon, alongside Pakistani intelligence operatives, as the masterminds who engineered the entire conspiracy.

== Cast ==
- Pavan Malhotra as Tiger Memon
- Kay Kay Menon as DCP Rakesh Maria
- Aditya Srivastava as Badshah Khan
- Kishor Kadam as ACP Bhaskar Dangle
- Zakir Hussain as Inspector Nandakumar Chaugule
- Savi Sidhu as Commissioner Amarjit Singh Samra
- Sharad Ponkshe as DCP Arup Patnaik
- Vijay Maurya as Dawood Ibrahim
- Imtiaz Ali as Yakub Memon
- Murali Sharma as Inspector Virendra Vani aka VV Vani
- Ravi Kale as Inspector Sawant
- Bharat Ganeshpure as Inspector Kadam
- Pankaj Jha as Anwar Theba
- Pratima Kazmi as Mrs. Khan, Badshah's mother
- Raju Shrestha as Pervez Shaikh
- Nawazuddin Siddiqui as Asgar Mukadam
- Raghunath Singh as Sheikh Ali Terrorist
- Dibyendu Bhattacharya as Yeda Yakub
- Gajraj Rao as Dawood Phanse
- Sanjay Gandhi as DCP K.L Bishnoi
- Prakash Jais as Farooq Pawle
- Goutam Maitra as Nasir Deklu
- Raj Arjun as Akram / Nasir
- Ragesh Asthana as Mohammad Dossa
- Raj Singh Chaudhary as Mushtaq Tarani
- Ramdas Jadhav as Inspector Srirang Nadgouda
- Jeetu Shastri as Salim Phansopkar
- Aliya Curmally as Shabana Memon
- Pranay Narayan as Imtiaz Gawate
- Ashraful Haque as Bashir Khan
- Asif Basra as Shanawaz Qureshi
- Anurag Kashyap as ISI agent at landing boat

== Production ==
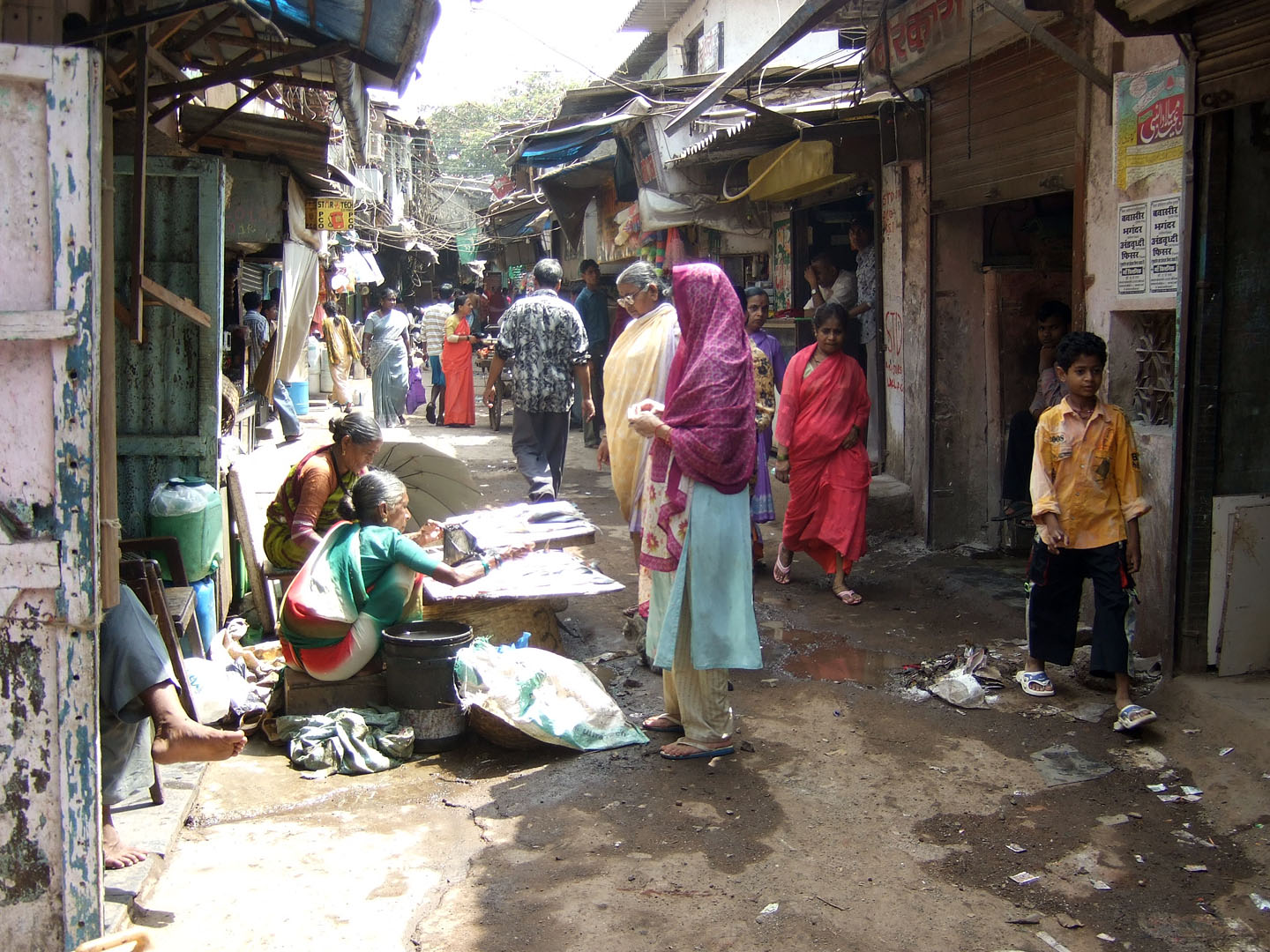
Some portions were also shot at the Dharavi slums.

On 12 March 1993, a series of 12 bomb blasts took place in Mumbai, Maharashtra. The attacks were carried out in retaliation for the Bombay riots that occurred earlier in the year. They resulted in 257 deaths and 713 injuries. Anurag Kashyap's feature film directorial debut Paanch ran into censorship trouble and had been shelved when Arindam Mitra, director of operations for Mid-Day, approached him with the book Black Friday: The True Story of the Bombay Bomb Blasts written by Hussain Zaidi, their chief crime correspondent. He wanted Kashyap to write a television series based on it for Aaj Tak, to be directed by Aditya Bhattacharya. Kashyap read an unedited version of the book, which had not been released at that point, and was "fascinated" by it. He wrote the script in episodes for the mini series but later felt it was better suited as a feature film.

Aaj Tak backed off from the project after their executives read the first episode and the project was abandoned. Kashyap then suggested Bhattacharya to make it into a film to which Bhattacharya offered him to direct instead. Zaidi wrote the book following three years of research on the subject. Kashyap researched for a year, including attending court to see how criminals look and to observe how court procedures work. He discovered criminals look normal and cast his actors based on this observation. The film's characters are all real people, including: Kay Kay Menon playing investigating officer Rakesh Maria, Pawan Malhotra as Tiger Memon and Aditya Srivastava as Badshah Khan, the police approver who helped them crack the case. Filmmaker Imtiaz Ali portrayed the role of Yakub Memon. To get their perspective, Kashyap also read Voices, a book recommended by Zaidi, which includes the testimony of several individuals who were arrested. He asked Devashish Makhija, who was his assistant director, to do the research. Makhija described the research material he found, and Kashyap continued to write. This resulted in the script being completed in 36 hours.

To recreate several of the film's locations, Kashyap watched actual footage from the government's Film Division, read all the newspapers describing the incident, and looked at press photographs. The most challenging thing for the crew, since the film was being shot in 2003, was to recreate 1993 when there were no cell phones or satellite television in India. The film was shot on the streets of Mumbai to avoid modern cars. It could not be shot from low angles because the hoardings and neon signs were contemporary. The crew had to make sure there were no mobile phones visible in the film. Kashyap said in an interview that he needed the city and had to "trim" it: "I shot mostly from the top angle and focused on my characters. There was a lot of guerrilla type shooting where nobody in the city came to know-we shot with hidden cameras. The police were [sic] supportive, Mid Day was at the job for permissions and all those things." He retained the actual names of people in the film who were involved in the blast.

Kashyap shot the film without permission on actual locations. In the film, Dawood's house was shot in three locations including Dubai and Lonavala. Because of the film's low-budget, the crew slept inside buses at night, shot the film during the day and moved to the next location. Kashyap shot at Behrampura, the site where the actual bomb was planted, using two hidden cameras, while the crew used walkie-talkies to communicate to avoid attracting a crowd. The film's principal photography began in October 2003 and was completed in 70 days. A twelve-minute police chase sequence in the film was improvised and shot in the Dharavi slums. It was neither in the script nor in the book. Kashyap wanted it because he felt it was boring to show normal arrests. He also wanted to use the chase to show the criminals' background and the exhaustion of the police. Natarajan Subramaniam served as the director of photography, while Aarti Bajaj was the editor.

== Soundtrack ==
The band Indian Ocean composed the soundtrack album and the background score, while Piyush Mishra wrote the lyrics. It was Indian Ocean's first film soundtrack and consisted of nine tracks—three songs and six instrumentals. The album was released on 15 June 2005 under the Times Music label, and in DVD format on 23 July 2005. Kashyap said he opted for the band because he "wanted to use someone away from the pollution of Mumbai kind of music, sounds that are virgin, which have an eccentricity too". K. J. Singh served as the sound producer.

== Release ==
Black Friday premiered at the 2004 Locarno International Film Festival and was screened at festivals in Germany, Estonia, South Korea and the United States. It was ready for screening in India on 29 December 2005. A petition was filed by Mustaq Moosa Tarani, one of the accused, who stated the film could prejudice the case. His petition noted the final verdict in the trial had not yet been released and demanded a ban on the film until then. The Bombay High Court agreed and directed that the film not be released. Mid Day appealed to the Supreme Court, challenging the High Court's judgment. However, the court lifted the ban only after the verdicts were delivered in 2006.

Kashyap did not feel the long delay before the film's release would "impair" its impact. He said: "It's a timeless film with a universal theme of religious intolerance leading to terrorism." He said that he was getting dressed in a suit, ready for the film's premiere on the release day, when he heard of the ban. He wore the same suit for a month and went into depression. The film was released after a twenty-month ban on 9 February 2007 on 100 screens in India, 10 in the United States, and three in South Africa. The worldwide distribution rights were acquired by Adlabs Films. The film was released in DVD format on 5 April 2007 and is also available on online streaming services Hotstar and Netflix.

Black Friday was made on a production budget of ₹6.5 crore (US$670,000) and grossed a total of ₹8 crore (US$830,000) at the box office. It won the Grand Jury Prize at the Indian Film Festival of Los Angeles, and was a nominee for the Golden Leopard (Best Film) at the 57th Locarno International Film Festival.

== Critical reception ==
Upon its release, Black Friday received critical acclaim. Rajeev Masand gave it a positive review and said it is "one of the best" films he'd watched in recent years. He wrote: "Please don't dismiss it as a boring art film, don't confuse it for a documentary, it's a dramatic feature that will rock your boat." Prithiviraj Hegde of Rediff.com noted: "While the film stays true as a dark, brooding, evil tale, it is told with a droll, dry humour that brings a smile even as the protagonists head toward their final unforgiving denouement." Anupama Chopra said the film had "several memorable sequences" but felt it was "static" as the screenplay does not allow the "characters to evolve or engage". Taran Adarsh praised the actors' performances calling the film "hard-hitting" with "the courage to say what it says". Nikhat Kazmi called it a "powerful, pointed and hard-hitting cinema that needs to be seen."

Deepa Gahlot of Sify called it a "fabulously crafted and superbly enacted film, but not stark enough to be documentary and not fictional enough to be a feature". She felt that Kashyap tried to justify Memon's actions in the film. Rahul Desai of Film Companion wrote that the film is "more of a feeling—singularly shocking, stirring, cataclysmic, yet journalistic and depressingly objective, and one of the great achievements in Indian cinema". Baradwaj Rangan mentioned in his review that the film is a series of "superbly-orchestrated sequences" saying the "only thing you could fault it for is that it doesn't know when to stop". Namrata Joshi of Outlook called it an "audacious, daring and explosive piece of cinema". In 2014, Raja Sen called it Kashyap's "possibly best" and a "gripping, gloriously gritty film". Khalid Mohamed called the film "defiantly uncompromising" and Kashyap's direction "unbelievably mature and searching". A review carried by The Hindu cited it as "one of the finest Indian films of recent years".

Among overseas critics, Matt Zoller Seitz of The New York Times described the film as "epic and raw, and cut out from the same bloody cloth as Salvador and Munich". The Hollywood Reporter's Kirk Honeycutt compared the film's "journalistic inquiry into cataclysmic social and political events" to that of Gillo Pontecorvo's The Battle of Algiers. He noted the film is objective without any "lurid sensationalism". Maitland McDonagh felt the film "humanizes the bombers without excusing their actions". She also said it "owes more to films like Munich than mainstream commercial spectacle".

David Chute of LA Weekly described it as "a rigorously naturalistic docudrama about a complex police investigation". Ethan Alter of Film Journal International called it "a potent reminder that Indian filmmaking isn't limited to Bollywood super-productions". Variety's Derek Elley called it a "fact-based procedural whose drama gets lost amid its analytical detail." A review carried by Time Out called the film a "post-9/11 food for thought and a vivid reminder not to get arrested in India, where the prisoners' bill of rights is very short".

== Legacy ==
Black Friday is cited by several critics and film scholars as Kashyap's best work. The film was included in IBN Live's 2013 list of the 100 greatest Indian films of all time and Mint's list of 70 iconic films of Indian cinema. In 2010, Raja Sen mentioned it in The Top 75 Hindi Films of the Decade list. It was included in critic and author Shubhra Gupta's book, 50 Films That Changed Bollywood, 1995-2015. Danny Boyle cited Black Friday as an inspiration for his 2008 Academy award-winning film Slumdog Millionaire. He stated that a chase in one of the opening scenes was based on a "12-minute police chase through the crowded Dharavi slum" in Black Friday. In 2014 filmmaker Vikramaditya Motwane, when asked about the most important films in last decade, replied Lage Raho Munna Bhai (2006) and Black Friday.
