= GDPR fines and notices =

European Union regulatory standards

The General Data Protection Regulation (GDPR) is a European Union regulation that specifies standards for data protection and electronic privacy in the European Economic Area, and the rights of European citizens to control the processing and distribution of personally-identifiable information.

Violators of GDPR may be fined up to €20 million, or up to 4% of the annual worldwide turnover of the preceding financial year, whichever is greater. The following is a list of fines and notices issued under the GDPR, including reasoning.

== Fines and notices ==
Date	Organisation	Amount	Issued by	Reason(s)
2018-10	Hospital do Barreiro	€400,000	Portugal (CNPD)	"...based on access policies to databases, which allowed technicians and physicians to consult patients’ clinical files, without proper authorization."
2018-11-21	Knuddels.de (German social network)	€20,000	Germany (LfDI)	"...unauthorized access to and disclosure of personal data of around 330,000 users, including passwords and email addresses."
2019-01-21	Google LLC	€50,000,000	France (CNIL)	Insufficient transparency, control, and consent over the processing of personal data for the purposes of behavioural advertising.
2019-03-07	Unnamed bank	€1,560	Hungary (NAIH)	Failure to erase and correct data at the request of the data subject.
2019-03-07	Unnamed debt collector	€1,560	Hungary (NAIH)	Breaching the principles of transparency and data minimisation.
2019-03-15	Bisnode (business, credit and market information)	€220,000	Poland (UODO)	Covert scraping of personal data.
2019-03-16	Lower Silesian Football Association	€13,000	Poland (UODO)	Listing personal information of 585 referees on its website.
2019-04-04	Rousseau (participatory democracy platform)	€50,000	Italy (GPDP)	Failing to protect users' personal data.
2019-05-08	The Municipality of Bergen	€170,000	Norway (Datatilsynet)	File with login credentials for 35,000 students and employees found in a public storage area.
2019-05-16	MisterTango UAB (payment services)	€61,500	Lithuania (ADA)	Processing more personal data than is necessary for effecting of the payment.
2019-05-28	Unnamed Belgian mayor	€2,000	Belgium (GBA/APD)	Misuse of personal data collected for local administrative purposes for election campaign purposes.
2019-06	La Liga	€250,000	Spain (AEPD)	Poorly disclosing purpose for requesting GPS and microphone permissions within the football league's mobile app. When the app was open, it transmitted the user's location if it detected an acoustic fingerprint embedded within game telecasts. This was used to help pinpoint the locations of venues that may be screening the games from unauthorized feeds.
2019-06-11	IDDesign A/S (furniture)	DKK 1,500,000	Denmark (Datatilsynet)	Failure to delete personal data from an older system: processing personal data for a longer time than necessary.
2019-06-18	Unnamed police officer	€1,400	Germany (LfDI)	Autonomously processing personal data for non-legal purposes.
2019-06-18	Sergic (real estate services)	€400,000	France (CNIL)	Failure to implement appropriate security measures; failure to define appropriate data retention periods for the personal data of unsuccessful rental candidates.
2019-06-18	Uniontrad Company (translation services)	€20,000	France (CNIL)	Excessive video surveillance of employees; single, shared password for messaging system; ignoring earlier CNIL order to change practices.
2019-06-24	EE (telecoms)	£100,000	UK (ICO)	Sending over 2.5 million direct marketing messages to its customers, without consent.
2019-06-27	UniCredit Bank Romania	€130,000	Romania (ANSPDCP)	Failure to implement appropriate technical and organisational measures
2019-07-08	British Airways	£183,000,000	UK (ICO)	Use of poor security arrangements that resulted in a 2018 web skimming attack affecting 500,000 consumers. Was later reduced to £20 million
2020-10-30	Marriott International	£18,400,000	UK (ICO)	Failure to keep millions of customers’ personal data secure
2019-07-03	Cathay Pacific	£500,000	UK (ICO)	Failure to protect the security of its customers’ personal data. Between October 2014 and May 2018 Cathay Pacific’s computer systems lacked appropriate security measures which led to customers’ personal details being exposed
2019-07-16	HagaZiekenhuis	€460,000	The Netherlands (AP)	Insufficient security of medical records
2019-07-25	Active Assurances	€180,000	France (CNIL)	Failure to implement appropriate security measures.
2019-07-25	PricewaterhouseCoopers	€150,000	Greece (HDPA)	Unlawful processing of employee data.
2019-08-21	Skellefteå High School Board	€20,000	Sweden (SDPA)	Using facial recognition technology to monitor the attendance of students in school on an invalid legal basis; processing sensitive biometric data unlawfully and failure to do an adequate impact assessment including seeking prior consultation with the Swedish DPA.
2019-??-??	Unnamed company	€3,135	Hungary (NAIH)	Infringing a data subject's access rights.
2019-08-12	Unnamed medical company	€55,000	Austria (DSB)	Not appointing a DPO, not publishing its contact details or reporting those to the supervisory authority, obligatory consent of data subjects (Art. 7), not providing information (Art. 13, 14), no DPIA despite handling sensitive data (Art. 35).
2019-08-12	Unnamed online retailer	€7,000	Latvia (DSI)	Nonconformity with data subjects rights to erasure and non-cooperation with the supervisory authority.
2019-09-19	Unnamed retailer	€10,000	Belgium (GBA/APD)	Demanding an electronic identity card to create a customer loyalty card.
2019-10-17	Vueling Airlines	€30,000	Spain (AEPD)	Failing to obtain valid consent to process customer cookies, as per privacy notice.
2019-12-09	1&1 Ionos	€9,550,000	Germany (BfDI)	Insufficient protection of personal data, failing to put “sufficient technical and organizational measures” in place to protect customer data in its call centers. Violation of article 32 of GDPR
2019-12-17	Doorstep Dispensaree	£275,000	UK (ICO)	"cavalier attitude to data protection”, having left 500,000 patient records in an unsecured location
2020-01-15	TIM S.p.A.	€27,800,000	Italy (GPDP)	Unlawful processing for marketing purposes
2020-03-10	Google LLC	SEK 75 M (€7 M)	Sweden (SDPA)	Right-to-be-forgotten violations
2020-07-06	BKR	€840,000	The Netherlands (AP)	Failing to give access to personal data free of charge, failing to provide easy means of accessing the data, putting unreasonable limits on the number of requests per individual
2020-07-14	Google LLC (Google Belgium)	€600,000	Belgium (GBA/APD)	Failure to respect a citizen's right to be forgotten.
2020-10-01	H&M	€35,300,000	Germany (HmbBfDI)	Illegal surveillance of several hundred employees
2020-12-10	Amazon Europe Core Sarl	€35,000,000	France (CNIL)	Deposit of cookies without obtaining consent and lack of information provided to users
2020-12-10	Google LLC	€60,000,000	France (CNIL)	Deposit of cookies without obtaining consent, lack of information provided to users and defective "opposition" mechanism
2020-12-10	Google Ireland Limited	€40,000,000	France (CNIL)	Deposit of cookies without obtaining consent, lack of information provided to users and defective "opposition" mechanism
2021-01-26	Grindr LLC	NOK 65 M (€6.5 M)	Norway (Datatilsynet)	Sharing special category data without valid consent
2021-03-10	Filigrana Comunicación	€8,000	Spain (AEPD)	Violation of Article 6(1)(a), 6(1)(f), 13 and 14 GDPR by collecting and re-using data from the Andalusian Education Department without a legitimate basis, and not fulfilling their information obligations.
2021-03-17	Miljø- og Kvalitetsledelse AS	€3,500 (NOK 35,000)	Norway (Datatilsynet)	Violation of Article 6(1) and Article 5(1)(a) of the GDPR by sharing a CCTV recording of a data subject vandalising a property with the data subject's employer, without a legal basis.
2021-03-18	Air Europa Líneas Aéreas S.A.	€600,000	Spain (AEPD)	infringement of Articles 32(1) and 33 GDPR, due to the lack of appropriate technical and organisational measures and of an adequate level of security and due to the delay in the notification of a personal data breach.
2021-03-22	FURNISHYOURSPACE SL	€3,000	Spain (AEPD)	Infringing the Spanish Law regulating cookies after an investigation launched due to a complaint referred by the Berlin DPA, for offering unclear information and not giving the option of rejecting the cookies.
2021-03-24	CP&A B.V.	€15,000	The Netherlands (AP)	Violation of Article 4(15) GDPR, Article 9 GDPR and Article 32 GDPR by processing the health data of sick employees, and for failing to implement appropriate security measures regarding such processing
2021-04-07	Orange Espagne, S.A.U.	€150,000 (reduced to €90,000)	Spain (AEPD)	Violation of Articles 6(1)(a) and 7 GDPR, as well as Article 21(1) LSSI, by sending bulk unsolicited commercial communications without adequately obtaining the consent of the users.
2021-04-14	Natural person (landlord)	€3000	Spain (AEPD)	Violating Articles 5(1)(c) and 13 GDPR in relation to a video surveillance system in an apartment building.
2021-04-15	Vodafone Espana, S.A.U.	€150,000 (reduced to €90,000)	Spain (AEPD)	Violation of Article 6(1)(a) GDPR by processing personal data without consent or any other legal basis. When imposing the fine, the AEPD took into account: The type of data affected: basic identifiers such as names, surnames, phone number.; The relation between the processing and the business activities of the respondent.; The previous fines on the same grounds.; The lack of diligence regarding the erasure request.; The AEPD finally fined Vodafone €150,000, that was reduced to €90,000 due to the assumption of responsibility and the early payment.
2021-04-22	Cyfrowy Polsat Spółka Akcyjna	€250,000	Poland (UODO)	Violation of Articles 24(1) and 32(1) and (2) GDPR by not implementing appropriate technical and organisational measures to ensure the security of personal data when cooperating with a courier company
2021-05-04	EDP Comercializadora, S.A.U.	€1,500,000	Spain (AEPD)	Violation of Articles 6, 13, 22 and 25 GDPR by not providing sufficient information to data subjects, and for not implementing adequate measures to avoid or mitigate risks related to the data processing.
2021-05-04	EDP ENERGÍA, S.A.U.	€1,500,000	Spain (AEPD)	Violation of Articles 6, 13, 22 and 25 GDPR by not providing sufficient information to data subjects, and for not implementing adequate measures to avoid or mitigate risks related to the data processing.
2021-05-06	Owner's association in Iasi	€500 (RON 2,463.30)	Romania (ANSPDCP)	Violation of Articles 58(1)(a), 58(1)(e), 83(5)(e) GDPR as well as of Article 8 of Government Ordinance No 2/2001, by violating the obligation to cooperate with the DPA during an investigation by failing to provide the information requested
2021-05-11	PVV (Overijssel)	€7,500	The Netherlands (AP)	Violation of Articles 4(12), 9(1) GDPR and 33(1) GDPR by unauthorised disclosure of a mailing list containing 101 email addresses, and failing to notify this breach to the DPA. The email addresses constituted special category data revealing political party opinions.
2021-05	Locatefamily.com	€525,000	The Netherlands (AP)	Failure to appoint a representative pursuant to article 27
2021-06-16	Amazon Europe Core Sarl	€746,000,000	Luxembourg (CNPD)	The largest fine for violating GDPR at the time. Related to targeted advertising.
2021-09-02	WhatsApp Ireland Ltd	€225 M	Ireland	
2021-12-16	Psykoterapiakeskus Vastaamo	€608,000	Finland	Failure to protect sensitive medical data.
2022-12-14	Viking Line	€230,000	Finland	The Office of the Data Protection Ombudsman's Sanctions Board has imposed an administrative fine on Viking Line Oy Abp for data protection violations related to the processing of its employees' health data.
2023-05-12	Meta Platforms	€1.2 billion	Ireland	Transferring data from the European Union to the United States without adequate privacy protections
2024-12-09	Sky Italia	€842,062	Italia (Garante)	Violations in telemarketing activities
2024-10-23	Selectra	€80,000	Italia (Garante)	Unlawful processing, data minimization, and storage limitation principles
