= Digital Personal Data Protection Act, 2023 =

Act of the Parliament of India

Parliament of India
- Long title: An Act to provide for the processing of digital personal data in a manner that recognises both the right of individuals to protect their personal data and the need to process such personal data for lawful purposes and for matters connected therewith or incidental thereto.
- Citation: Act No. 22 of 2023
- Territorial extent: India
- Passed by: Lok Sabha
- Passed: 7 August 2023
- Passed by: Rajya Sabha
- Passed: 9 August 2023
- Assented to by: President of India
- Assented to: 11 August 2023
- Commenced: 13 November 2025 (Sub-section (2) of section 1, section 2, sections 18 to 26 sections 35, 38, 39, 40, 41, 42, 43, and subsections (1) and (3) of section 44 of the Act) 13 November 2026 (sub-section (9) of section 6 and clause (d) of sub-section (1) of section 27 of the Act) 13 May 2027 (Remaining provisions)

Legislative history

Initiating chamber: Lok Sabha
- Bill citation: Bill No. 113 of 2023
- Introduced by: Ashwini Vaishnaw Minister of Electronics and Information Technology, Minister of Communications, Minister of Railways
- First reading: 3 August 2023

Keywords
- Consent, Data privacy, Data breach
- Status: In force

The Digital Personal Data Protection Act, 2023 (also known as DPDP Act or DPDPA-2023) is an act of the Parliament of India to provide for the processing of digital personal data in a manner that recognises both the right of individuals to protect their personal data and the need to process such personal data for lawful purposes. This is the first Act of the Parliament of India where "she/her" pronouns were used unlike the usual "he/him" pronouns.

== Timeline ==
- 18 November 2022: The Ministry of Electronics and Information Technology released the Digital Personal Data Protection Bill, 2022 for public consultation.
- 5 July 2023: The cabinet approved the Digital Personal Data Protection Bill, 2023 which was the revised version of the 2022 bill.
- 3 August 2023: Digital Personal Data Protection Bill, 2023 was introduced in Lok Sabha, the lower house of the Parliament of India.
- 7 August 2023: Digital Personal Data Protection Bill, 2023 was passed by Lok Sabha.
- 9 August 2023: Digital Personal Data Protection Bill, 2023 was introduced and passed by Rajya Sabha, the upper house of the Parliament of India.
- 11 August 2023: President of India gave assent to the Digital Personal Data Protection Bill, 2023 which made it the Digital Personal Data Protection Act, 2023.
- 13 November 2025: Provisions in respect of establishment of the Data Protection Board of India bought into force.

== Background ==
- On 24 August 2017, the Supreme Court of India gave the Right to Privacy verdict. In the case of Justice K. S. Puttaswamy (Retd.) and Anr. vs Union Of India And Ors., the Supreme court held that the Right to Privacy is a fundamental right protected under Article 21 and Part III of the Indian Constitution.
- After the verdict the Government of India has set up a data protection framework which started taking steps towards the creation of the data protection legislation after the Supreme Court of India's privacy verdict.
- On 22 December 2018, the constitution of committee of experts to deliberate on a data protection framework for India takes place by the chairmanship of Justice B.N. Srikrishna.
- After the Government of India has constituted an expert committee under, the committee has sought public consultation on various white papers on data protection framework for India.
- The Personal Data Protection Bill, 2018 draft was released.
- The committee of experts under chairmanship of Justice B.N. Srikrishna has released their Data Protection Committee report.
- On 14 August 2018, the Ministry of Electronics and Information Technology sought feedback on the Draft Personal Data Protection Bill.
- On 4 December 2019, after further deliberations the Bill was approved by the cabinet ministry of India.
- On 11 December 2019, the Personal Data Protection Bill, 2019 was tabled in Lok Sabha.
- On 11 December 2019, the Personal Data Protection Bill, 2019 was referred to the Joint Parliamentary Committee.
- On 16 December 2021, the standing committee has submitted its report on the bill.
- On 3 August 2022, the Personal Data Protection Bill, 2019 was withdrawn.
- On 18 November 2022, the Ministry of Electronics and Information Technology released the draft legislation of the data protection framework for public consultation.
- On 3 August 2023, the Digital Personal Data Protection Bill, 2023 was introduced in the Lok Sabha

=== Personal Data Protection Bill, 2019 ===
The Ministry of Electronics and Information Technology set up a committee to study issues related to data protection. The committee was chaired by retired Supreme Court judge Justice B. N. Srikrishna. The committee submitted the draft version of Personal Data Protection in July 2018. The report was later modified several times by the Government of India and, after receiving the approval of central cabinet, the draft legislation was tabled in the Parliament of India on 11 December 2019.

==== As bill ====
The Bill aims to:

to provide for protection of the privacy of individuals relating to their personal data, specify the flow and usage of personal data, create a relationship of trust between persons and entities processing the personal data, protect the fundamental rights of individuals whose personal data are processed, to create a framework for organisational and technical measures in processing of data, laying down norms for social media intermediary, cross-border transfer, accountability of entities processing personal data, remedies for unauthorised and harmful processing, and to establish a Data Protection Authority of India for the said purposes and for matters connected there with or incidental thereto.

It provided for extensive provisions around collection of consent, assessment of datasets, data flows and transfers of personal data, including to third countries and other aspects around anonymized and non-personal data.

==== Criticism and withdrawal ====
The revised 2019 Bill was criticized by Justice B. N. Srikrishna, the drafter of the original Bill, as having the ability to turn India into an "Orwellian State". In an interview with Economic Times, Srikrishna said that, "The government can at any time access private data or government agency data on grounds of sovereignty or public order. This has dangerous implications.”

The role of social media intermediaries is being regulated more tightly on several fronts. The Wikimedia Foundation is hoping that the PDP bill will prove the lesser evil compared with the Draft Information Technology [Intermediary Guidelines (Amendment) Rules] 2018.

Forbes India reports that "there are concerns that the Bill gives the government blanket powers to access citizens' data."

The bill after being tabled was referred to the JPC which was chaired by Meenakshi Lekhi. After it received criticism from stakeholders, opposition and experts the bill was withdrawn from the Parliament of India on 3 August 2022.

=== Digital Personal Data Protection Bill, 2023 ===
==== Aim ====
The Bill provides for the processing of digital personal data in a manner that recognizes both the rights of the individuals to protect their personal data and the need to process such personal data for lawful purposes and for matters connected therewith or incidental thereto.

The Digital Personal Data Protection Bill, 2023 is the draft version of the Digital Personal Data Protection Act, 2023, initially the government has released its the Digital Personal Data Protection Bill, 2022 on 18 November 2022 for public consultation till 2 January 2023 and approved the revised version of the earlier draft which was released for public consultation making it the Digital Personal Data Protection Bill, 2023.

==== Timeline, introduction and passage ====
- On 18 November 2022, the Digital Personal Data Protection Bill, 2022 was released for public consultation, the deadline for receiving comments was 17 December 2022
- On 17 December 2022, the Ministry of Electronics and Information Technology has extended the deadline for receiving public comments till 2 January 2023
- On 5 July 2023, the cabinet has approved the Digital Personal Data Protection Bill, 2023 which is the revised version of the bill which was put up for public consultation earlier.
- On 3 August 2023, the revised version of the Digital Personal Data Protection Bill, 2022 which is the Digital Personal Data Protection Bill, 2023 was introduced by Ashwini Vaishnaw, Minister of Electronics and Information Technology in Lok Sabha.
- On 7 August 2023, the bill was passed by Lok Sabha. The bill was then introduced and passed in the upper house of the Indian Parliament Rajya Sabha on 9 August 2023.
- On 11 August 2023, Draupadi Murmu, President of India has given assent to the Digital Personal Data Protection Bill, 2023 which made it the Digital Personal Data Protection Act, 2023.

== Overview ==
The Act protects digital personal data (that is, the data by which a person may be identified) by providing for the following

- The obligations of Data Fiduciaries (that is, persons, companies and government entities who process data) for data processing (that is, collection, storage or any other operation on personal data)
- The rights and duties of Data Principals (that is, the person to whom the data relates)
- Financial penalties for breach of rights, duties and obligations
- Establishment of Data Protection Board of India

== Comparison with GDPR ==
The Digital Personal Data Protection Act, 2023 (DPDP Act) and the European Union's General Data Protection Regulation (GDPR) share similar principles but differ in key aspects. The DPDP Act-2023 applies only to digital personal data, while GDPR covers all forms of personal data. Unlike GDPR, DPDP Act-2023 does not distinguish between personal and sensitive personal data. Both laws grant similar rights to individuals but differ in their approach to legal bases for data processing.

Comparison of Digital Personal Data Protection Act, 2023 (DPDP Act-2023) and General Data Protection Regulation (GDPR)
Feature	Digital Personal Data Protection Act, 2023 (DPDP Act-2023)	General Data Protection Regulation (GDPR)
Scope	Regulates digital personal data processing; includes extraterritorial application for offering goods/services in India.	Covers all personal data, digital or otherwise; applies to any organization processing data of individuals within the EU, irrespective of location.
Type of Data	Limited to digital personal data.	Covers all personal data, including non-digital.
Legal Basis for Processing	Consent required with some legitimate use cases (e.g., employment, legal obligations, emergencies). Does not include contractual necessity or legitimate interests.	Consent if alternative bases do not apply e.g. legitimate interests, contractual necessity, legal obligations, emergencies ("vital interests") etc.
Data Principal Rights	Right to access, correction, erasure, grievance redressal. Unique rights: appoint another to exercise rights on data principal’s behalf in event of death/incapacity.	Rights to be informed, access, rectification, erasure, restriction of processing, data portability, objection, not to be subject to automated decisions.
Cross-Border Data Transfers	Permitted unless to jurisdictions restricted by Indian Government.	Permitted based on adequacy decisions.

== Data Protection Board of India ==
Under section 18 of the Digital Personal Data Protection Act, 2023, the Data Protection Board of India is a body that adjudicates the dispute(s) between those whose personal data has been given to a platform and the platform which has in turn breached the obligations under the law.

== Rights and provisions ==
- Right to access personal data
- Right to correction and erasure of data
- Right to revoke consent
- Special provisions for the protection of data related minors (under 18 children)
- Minimum penalty for breach is 50 crore INR
- The terms and conditions and information related to collection of data should be made available in all the 22 languages in the 8th schedule of the Indian constitution
- Right to grievance redressal
- Right to nominate a consent manager to manage their data related requests on behalf of a data principal (The right to nominate a person to exercise rights in case of death or incapacity)
- The Act does not permit processing which is detrimental to well-being of children or involves their tracking, behavioral monitoring or targeted advertising
- The Act requires notification of data breaches to Data Protection Board and affected individuals

== Exemptions ==
The Act has made exemptions from the regulations related to the Act, they are:

- The processing of personal data is necessary for enforcing any legal right or claim
- The processing of personal data by any court or tribunal or any other body in India which is entrusted by law with the performance of any judicial or quasi-judicial or regulatory or supervisory function, where such processing is necessary for the performance of such function
- Personal data is processed in the interest of prevention, detection, investigation or prosecution of any offence or contravention of any law for the time being in force in India
- Personal data of Data Principals not within the territory of India is processed pursuant to any contract entered into with any person outside the territory of India by any person based in India
- The processing is necessary for a scheme of compromise or arrangement or merger or amalgamation of two or more companies or a reconstruction by way of demerger or otherwise of a company, or transfer of undertaking of one or more company to another company, or involving division of one or more companies, approved by a court or tribunal or other authority competent to do so by any law for the time being in force
- The processing is for the purpose of ascertaining the financial information and assets and liabilities of any person who has defaulted in payment due on account of a loan or advance taken from a financial institution, subject to such processing being in accordance with the provisions regarding disclosure of information or data in any other law for the time being in force.

== Criticism ==
Several points of criticism have been recorded by Editors guild of India, Press Club of India, RTI activists and INDIA Bloc.

- The Act is only applicable to the data collected digitally and when offline data gets digitized. Not having the applicability on offline personal data was criticized as there is no framework on how such data is handled.

== See also ==
- General Data Protection Regulation
- Digital Personal Data Protection Rules, 2025
- Information privacy law
- Data Protection Act 2018
- Data security
