= Personal Data Protection Bill, 2019 =

Data Protection Bill of India

Parliament of India
- Long title: Personal Data Protection Bill 2019
- Territorial extent: India
- Enacted by: Parliament of India

Legislative history
- Introduced by: Ravi Shankar Prasad Minister of Electronics and Information
- Introduced: 11 December 2019
- Committee report: Joint Parliamentary Committee (JPC) on Personal Data Protection
- Status: Withdrawn

The Personal Data Protection Bill, 2019 (PDP Bill 2019) was a proposed legislation by the Parliament of India which was withdrawn. The bill covers mechanisms for protection of personal data and proposes the setting up of a Data Protection Authority of India for the same. Some key provisions the 2019 Bill provides for which the 2018 draft Bill did not, such as that the central government can exempt any government agency from the Bill and the Right to Be Forgotten, have been included.

== Background and timeline ==
- In July 2017, the Ministry of Electronics and Information Technology set up a committee to study issues related to data protection. The committee was chaired by retired Supreme Court judge Justice B. N. Srikrishna.
- The committee submitted the draft Personal Data Protection Bill, 2018 in July 2018.
- After further deliberations the Bill was approved by the cabinet ministry of India on 4 December 2019 as the Personal Data Protection Bill 2019 and tabled in the Lok Sabha on 11 December 2019.
- In March 2020 the Bill was being analyzed by a Joint Parliamentary Committee (JPC) in consultation with experts and stakeholders. The JPC, which was set up in December 2019, was headed by Meenakshi Lekhi, Member of Parliament. While the JPC was tasked with a short deadline to finalize the draft law before the Budget Session of 2020, it has sought more time to study the Bill and consult stakeholders.
- The bill was withdrawn in August 2022.

== Provisions ==
The Bill aims to:

to provide for protection of the privacy of individuals relating to their personal data, specify the flow and usage of personal data, create a relationship of trust between persons and entities processing the personal data, protect the fundamental rights of individuals whose personal data are processed, to create a framework for organisational and technical measures in processing of data, laying down norms for social media intermediary, cross-border transfer, accountability of entities processing personal data, remedies for unauthorised and harmful processing, and to establish a Data Protection Authority of India for the said purposes and for matters connected there with or incidental thereto.

It provided for extensive provisions around collection of consent, assessment of datasets, data flows and transfers of personal data, including to third countries and other aspects around anonymized and non-personal data.

== Criticism ==
The revised 2019 Bill was criticized by Justice B. N. Srikrishna, the drafter of the original Bill, as having the ability to turn India into an “Orwellian State". (Note: Orwellian State is a term to denote draconian control of its people by a state as described in the novel ‘Nineteen Eighty Four’ by George Orwell.) In an interview with Economic Times, Srikrishna said that, "The government can at any time access private data or government agency data on grounds of sovereignty or public order. This has dangerous implications.” This view is shared by a think tank in their comment number 3.

Fresh criticism on the international level comes from an advisor to a group proposing an alternative text. A moderately critical summary is available from an India scholar working with an American co-author.

The role of social media intermediaries is being regulated more tightly on several fronts. The Wikimedia Foundation is hoping that the PDP bill will prove the lesser evil compared with the Draft Information Technology [Intermediary Guidelines (Amendment) Rules] 2018.

Forbes India reports that "there are concerns that the Bill [...] gives the government blanket powers to access citizens' data."

Jaiveer Shergill, a prominent Supreme Court Lawyer has shared the pitfalls and gaps of the current version of the draft bill. There are serious loopholes of how the bill is unable to identify the scope of governmental bodies in distinguishing who has access to the personal data of the citizens and missing state bodies to monitor the personal data.

== Withdrawal ==
The Data Protection Bill was withdrawn from the Lok Sabha and the Parliament as reported in the Bulletin - Part 1 No. 189 dated August 3, 2022. The withdrawal of the Data Protection Bill come with reports that a more comprehensive version of the Bill may be introduced.

The Digital Personal Data Protection Act, 2023 was passed by the Parliament of India and received the assent of the President of India making it the country's data protection legislation after the withdrawal of Personal Data Protection Bill, 2019.

== See also ==
- Information Technology (Intermediary Guidelines (Amendment) Rules) 2018
- Digital Personal Data Protection Act, 2023
- UK Data Protection Act 2018
- EU General Data Protection Regulation
- UK Data Protection Act 1998
- Data security
