= Srikrishna Commission =

Public inquiry in India

Srikrishna Commission or Justice B. N. Srikrishna Commission of Inquiry was constituted by the Government of Maharashtra, India, under Justice Srikrishna for investigating the causes of the Bombay riots. For five years until 1998, he examined victims, witnesses and alleged perpetrators. The commission was disbanded by the Shiv Sena-led government in January 1996 and on public opposition was later reconstituted on 28 May 1996; though when it was reconstituted its terms of reference were extended to include the Mumbai bomb blasts that followed in March 1993.

The report of the commission stated that the tolerant and secular foundations of the city were holding even if a little shakily. Justice Srikrishna indicted those he alleged as largely responsible for the second phase of the bloodshed and to some extent the first, the Shiv Sena.

The Shiv Sena government rejected its recommendations. Since under the Commissions of Inquiry Act, an Inquiry is not a court of law (even if it conducts proceedings like a court of law) and the report of an inquiry is not binding on Governments, Srikrishna's recommendations cannot be directly enforced. To date, the recommendations of the Commission have neither been accepted nor acted upon by the Maharashtra Government. Many indicted policemen were promoted by the government and indicted politicians continue to hold high political office even today.

On 10 July 2008, a Mumbai court sentenced former Shiv Sena MP Madhukar Sarpotdar and two other party activists to a year's rigorous imprisonment in connection with the riots. However, he was immediately granted bail. He died on 20 February 2010 without serving his sentence.
