= Joint parliamentary committee =

Indian ad hoc committee

Joint Parliamentary Committee overview
- Type: Ad hoc Committee of Parliament of India
- Jurisdiction: India
- Joint Parliamentary Committee executive: Jagdambika Pal, Chairman
- Parent agency: Parliament of India

Joint Parliamentary Committee (JPC) is one type of ad hoc parliamentary committee constituted by the Indian parliament.

== Formation ==
Joint Parliamentary Committee is formed when motion is adopted by one house and it is supported or agreed by the other house.

Another way to form a Joint Parliamentary committee is that two presiding chiefs of both houses can write to each other, communicate with each other and form the joint parliamentary committee.

== Membership ==
The number of Lok Sabha members is twice that of Rajya Sabha members. For example, if the Joint Parliamentary Committee has 10 Lok Sabha members, then 5 members will be from the Rajya Sabha, making the total number of JPC members 15. The strength of a JPC may vary each time.

== Powers ==
A JPC can obtain evidence of experts, public bodies, associations, individuals or interested parties suo moto or on requests made by them. If a witness fails to appear before a JPC in response to summons, his conduct constitutes a contempt of the House.

The JPC can take oral and written evidence or call for documents in connection with a matter under its consideration. The proceedings of parliamentary committees are confidential, but in the case of the joint committee which went into "Irregularities in Securities and Banking Transactions", the committee decided that considering the widespread public interest in the matter, the chairman should brief the press about deliberations of the committees.

Ministers are not generally called by the committees to give evidence. However, in case of the Irregularities in Securities and Banking Transactions probe again, an exception was made, with the JPC, with the permission of the Speaker, seeking information on certain points from ministers and calling Minister of Finance and Ministry of Health and Family Welfare.

The government may withhold or decline to produce a document if it is considered prejudicial to the safety or interest of the State. The Speaker has the final word on any dispute over calling for evidence against a person or production of a document.

== List of former JPCs ==
=== Bofors scandal (1987) ===
The first JPC was formed in August 1987 to investigate the Bofors scandal. It was chaired by Congress politician B. Shankaranand. It was formed on a motion moved by the then defence minister K.C. Pant in the Lok Sabha on August 6, 1987. The Rajya Sabha endorsed it a week later. The committee, held 50 sittings and gave its report on April 26, 1988. Opposition parties boycotted the committee on the ground that it was packed with Congress members. The JPC report was tabled in the Parliament, but it was rejected by the Opposition.

=== Harshad Mehta Stock market scam (1992) ===
The second JPC was formed in August 1992. It was headed by former Union minister and senior Congress leader Ram Niwas Mirdha. It was set up to probe Irregularities in Securities and Banking Transactions in the aftermath of the Harshad Mehta scandal. The motion was moved by the then minister for parliamentary affairs Ghulam Nabi Azad in the Lok Sabha on August 6, 1992. The Rajya Sabha concurred with it the next day. The recommendations of the JPC were neither accepted in full nor implemented.

=== Ketan Parekh share market scam (2001) ===
The third JPC was formed in April 2001. It was assigned to probe the Ketan Parekh share market scam. Then parliamentary affairs minister Pramod Mahajan piloted a motion in the Lok Sabha on April 26, 2001, to put it in place. Senior BJP member Lt Gen Prakash Mani Tripathi (retd) was named the chairman. The committee held 105 sittings and gave its report on December 19, 2002. The committee recommended sweeping changes in stock market regulations. However, many of these recommendations were diluted later.

=== Soft drink pesticide issue (2003) ===
The fourth JPC was set up in August 2003 to look into pesticide residues in soft drinks, fruit juice and other beverages and other essential things and to set safety standards. It was headed by Nationalist Congress Party chief Sharad Pawar. The JPC held 17 sittings and submitted its report to Parliament on February 4, 2004. The report confirmed that soft drinks did have pesticide residues and recommended stringent norms for drinking water.

This JPC made a recommendation about National Standards Body of India which was agreed by Parliament and the Govt. It recommended that Bureau of Indian Standards should be headed by an eminent scientist. No action has however been taken on this recommendation even after 16 years.

=== 2G spectrum case (2011) ===
The fifth JPC has been constituted in February 2011 to probe 2G case. It is headed by P.C. Chacko. It has 30 members. 15 opposition members belonging to BJP, JD (U), CPI, CPM, Trinamool Congress, BJD, DMK and the AIADMK in the 30-member panel accused P.C. Chacko of being "partisan" and demanded his removal (They submitted a memorandum to the Lok Sabha Speaker expressing their “no-confidence”) as they criticised the draft report for giving clean chit to Prime Minister Manmohan Singh and Finance Minister P Chidambaram. So PC Chacko agreed to amend the JPC draft report.

=== VVIP Chopper scam (2013) ===
The Government has moved a motion in the Rajya Sabha on February 27, 2013, which was adopted by voice vote-for formation of a JPC "to inquire into the allegations of payment of bribes in the acquisition of VVIP helicopters by the Ministry of Defence from M/s Agusta Westland and the role of alleged middlemen in the transaction." The JPC will have 10 members from the Rajya Sabha and 20 from the Lok Sabha and shall give its report within three months of its first sitting.

=== Land Acquisition (2015) ===
The Right to Fair Compensation and Transparency in Land Acquisition, Rehabilitation and Resettlement (Second Amendment) Bill, 2015 has been referred to a Joint Parliamentary Committee of both the Houses under the Chairmanship of Shri S.S.Ahluwalia.

=== Personal Data Protection Bill (2019) ===
The Personal Data Protection Bill 2019 (PDP Bill 2019) was tabled in the Indian Parliament by the Ministry of Electronics and Information Technology (MEITy) on 11 December 2019. In March, 2020 the Bill was being analyzed by a Joint Parliamentary Committee (JPC) in consultation with experts and stakeholders. The JPC, which was let up in December, 2019, is headed by BJP Member of Parliament (MP) Meenakshi Lekhi. While the JPC was tasked with a short deadline to finalize the draft law before the Budget Session of 2020, it has sought more time to study the Bill and consult stakeholders. However the bill was withdrawn in August 2022 and later a more comprehensive bill, the Digital Personal Data Protection Act, 2023 was passed by the Parliament of India.

=== Waqf (Amendment) Bill (2024) ===
The Waqf (Amendment) Bill (2024) was introduced by the government to the Indian parliament on the 8th of August 2024 with an objective to streamline the Waqf Board's works and ensure an efficient management of waqf properties. The Bill was referred to the JPC following the Congress-led Opposition's Protest against the bill. The JPC meetings were held on September 18, 19 and 20, 2024.

=== One Nation, One Election (2024) ===
In December 2024, the Indian Parliament established a 39-member Joint Parliamentary Committee (JPC) to evaluate the feasibility of implementing the "One Nation, One Election" initiative, which proposes conducting simultaneous elections for the Lok Sabha, state assemblies, and local bodies. The committee is chaired by BJP MP PP Chaudhary, a former Union Minister and legal expert. It comprises 27 members from the Lok Sabha and 12 from the Rajya Sabha, including prominent figures such as Anurag Thakur, Bansuri Swaraj, Sambit Patra, Priyanka Gandhi Vadra, Manish Tewari, and Supriya Sule. The JPC's mandate is to scrutinize the Constitution (129th Amendment) Bill, 2024, and the Union Territories Laws (Amendment) Bill, 2024, both introduced by Union Law Minister Arjun Ram Meghwal. The committee is tasked with analyzing these bills and submitting its report by the last week of the next parliamentary session.

== See also ==
- Joint committee (legislative)
