= Black Friday: The True Story of the Bombay Bomb Blasts =

2002 book by Hussain Zaidi

- First edition
- Author: Hussain Zaidi
- Language: English
- Genre: Non-fiction; Crime
- Publisher: Penguin Books
- Publication date: 2002
- Publication place: India
- Media type: Print (paperback, hardback)
- Pages: 286
- ISBN: 9780143028215

Black Friday: The True Story of the Bombay Bomb Blasts is a 2002 Indian non-fiction crime novel written by journalist Hussain Zaidi. It retraces the events that led to the 1993 Bombay bombings and the investigation that followed. It was first published by Penguin Books in 2002 and later in 2008. The novel was adapted into a feature film of the same name directed by Anurag Kashyap.

== Development ==
Hussain Zaidi was a journalist and was doing a story as a free-lancer for Blitz about the torture on the accused of the 1993 Bombay bombings. The article was published in 1994 and the editor of the magazine paid Zaidi double the amount that was promised after seeing the amount of research put into the story. Zaidi then continued covering the underworld, cops and the politicians.

In 1997, author Vikram Chandra was writing Sacred Games and wanted help from someone who "knew the underworld in and out" and approached Zaidi who gave him a lot of information in a year. Chandra then suggested him to write a book since he had so much information about the subject. He then set up a meeting with the editor of Penguin Books. Zaidi started writing about the serial bomb blasts and started collecting statements, evidence, FIRs and interviews with Dawood Ibrahim and Tiger Memon and finished it in four years.

== Adaptation ==
Black Friday was the film adaptation written and directed by Anurag Kashyap. The film stars Kay Kay Menon, Aditya Srivastava, Pavan Malhotra, Kishor Kadam, Zakir Hussain and was released in India on 9 February 2007.
