= Bombay riots =

Riots in Mumbai in December 1992 and January 1993

- Location: Bombay, Maharashtra, India
- Date: 6 December 1992 – 26 January 1993
- Target: Muslims
- Attack type: Rioting, pogrom
- Deaths: 900 (estimate), 575 Muslims, 275 Hindus, 50 Others
- Perpetrator: Shiv Sena
- Motive: Reaction to heightened communal tensions due to the demolition of the Babri Masjid, religious persecution

The Bombay riots took place in Bombay (present-day Mumbai), Maharashtra, India, between December 1992 and January 1993. An estimated 900 people, predominantly Muslims, were killed. The riots were mainly due to escalations of hostilities after large scale protests by Muslims in reaction to the 1992 Babri Masjid Demolition by Hindu Karsevaks in Ayodhya; and by Hindus in regards with the Ram Temple issue.

The Shiv Sena, a Hindutva political party in Maharashtra, is said to have organised the riots. A high-ranking member of the special branch later stated that the police were fully aware of the Shiv Sena's capabilities to commit acts of violence, and that they had incited hate against Muslims.

Historian Barbara Metcalf has described the riots as an anti-Muslim pogrom, where the official death toll was of 575 Muslims, 275 Hindus and 50 others. The riots were followed by the 1993 Bombay Bombings.

== Background ==
The Bombay riots can be considered a result of larger communal tensions throughout India. The Babri Mosque demolition on 6 December 1992, an act of communal violence by Hindutva activists, is considered to be the immediate cause of the riots.

== Overview of the riot ==
As determined by the government's Srikrishna Commission; the riots started as a result of communal tension prevailing in the city after the Babri Mosque demolition on 6 December 1992. The Commission identified two phases to the riots. The first was mainly a Muslim instigation as a result of the Babri Masjid demolition in the week immediately succeeding 7 December 1992 led by political leaders representing Hindutva in the city of Ayodhya. The second phase was a Hindu backlash occurring as a result of the killings of Hindu Mathadi Kamgar (workers) by Muslims in Dongri (an area of South Bombay), stabbing of Hindus in Muslim majority areas and burning of six Hindus, including a disabled girl in Radhabai Chawl. This phase occurred in January 1993, with most incidents reported between 6 and 20 January.

The Report asserted that the communal passions of the Hindus were aroused to fever pitch by the inciting writings in print media, particularly Saamna and Navaakal which gave exaggerated accounts of the Mathadi murders and the Radhabai Chawl incident. From 8 January 1993, many riots occurred between Hindus led by the Shiv Sena and Muslims potentially funded by the Bombay underworld at that time. An estimated 575 Muslims and 275 Hindus were killed at the end of the riot. The communal violence and rioting triggered off by the burning at Dongri and Radhabhai Chawl, and the following retaliatory violence by Shiv Sena was hijacked by local criminal elements who potential opportunity to make quick gains. By the time the right wing Hindu organization Shiv Sena realised that enough had been done by way of "retaliation", the violence and rioting was beyond the control of its leaders who had to issue an appeal to put an end to it.

== Role of the Shiv Sena ==
The violence was widely reported as having been orchestrated by the Shiv Sena, a Hindu-nationalist political party in Maharashtra. A high-ranking member of the special branch later stated that the police were fully aware of the Shiv Sena's capabilities to commit acts of violence, and that they had incited hate against the minority communities. Historian Barbara Metcalf has stated that the riots were anti-Muslim pogrom. Bal Thackeray, the leader of the Shiv Sena, was arrested in July 2000 for his complicity in the riots and for 'inflammatory writings' that may have helped propagate the riots. The case was later dismissed.

== Justice B.N. Srikrishna Commission ==
Justice Srikrishna, then a relatively junior Judge of the Bombay High Court, accepted the task of investigating the causes of the riots, something that many of his colleagues had turned down. For five years until 1998, he examined victims, witnesses and alleged perpetrators. Detractors came initially from left quarters who were wary of a judge who was a devout and practising Hindu. The commission was disbanded by the Shiv Sena led government in January 1996 and on public opposition was later reconstituted on 28 May 1996; though when it was reconstituted its terms of reference were extended to include the Bombay bomb blasts that followed in March 1993.

The report documented the active complicity of the Bombay Police in targeting Muslims while protecting the Shiv Sena activists during the riots.

The report of the commission stated that the tolerant and secular foundations of the city were holding even if a little shakily. Justice Srikrishna indicted those he alleged as largely responsible for the second phase of the bloodshed and to some extent the first, the Shiv Sena.

The report was criticised as "politically motivated". For a while, its contents were a closely guarded secret and no copies were available. The Shiv Sena government rejected its recommendations. Since under the Commissions of Inquiry Act, an Inquiry is not a court of law (even if it conducts proceedings like a court of law) and the report of an inquiry is not binding on Governments, Srikrishna's recommendations cannot be directly enforced.

According to the commission report, the causes of these riots were listed as

1. Class Conflict
2. Economic Competition
3. Decline of employment
4. Population density
5. Changing political discourse.

The immediate causes were listed as

1. the demolition of Babri Masjid
2. the aggravation of Muslim sentiments by the Hindus with their celebration rallies
3. the insensitive and harsh approach of the police while handling the protesting mobs which initially were not violent.

== Arrests, convictions and verdict ==
Only 3 convictions happened in the 1992-93 Bombay riots cases. On 10 July 2008, a Mumbai court sentenced former Shiv Sena MP Madhukar Sarpotdar and two other party activists to a year's rigorous imprisonment in connection with the riots. However, he was immediately granted bail. He died on 20 February 2010 without serving his sentence.

== In popular culture ==
The riots are portrayed in several different films:

- They are the key plot in the 1995 film Bombay in which the protagonists, a Muslim wife and her Hindu husband, are separated from their children during the riots.
- The 2004 Hindi film Black Friday deals with the events leading to the riots and the aftermath which led to the 1993 Bombay bomb blasts, and related investigations, told through the different stories of the people involved – police, conspirators, victims, middlemen.
- The violence is also an instrumental part of the plot of the film Slumdog Millionaire. The protagonist, Jamal Malik's mother is among those killed in the riots, and he later remarks "If it wasn't for Rama and Allah, we'd still have a mother."
- The event also appeared in 2010 film Striker, 2000 film Fiza and 2013 film Shahid.
- The Bombay Riots set the background for the popular Netflix TV Series Sacred Games, which began in 2018. The TV Series shows the rivalry of the protagonist, Ganesh Gaitonde's gang & Isa's gang amidst religious clashes.

== See also ==
- List of massacres in India

== Sources ==
- Dawood and ISI's role in riots, archived from the original on 16 July 2011
- 275 Hindus dead(32%)575 Muslims(67%) officially dead (45 unidentified)
- Detailed Report
- Official Supreme Court of India Biography, archived from the original on 17 January 2006
- Justice B.N. Srikrishna, "Skinning a Cat", (2005) 8 SCC (Jour) 3 (a critique of judicial activism in India).
- Justice B.N. Srikrishna, "Maxwell versus Mimamsa", (2004) 6 SCC (Jour) 49 (a critique of Indian and Western interpretative techniques).
- Praveen Swami A welter of evidence: How Thackeray and Co. figure in the Srikrishna Commission Report, archived from the original on 24 November 2002 (examining the Justice Srikrishna Commission's indictment of Bal Thackeray and the Shiv Sena).
- Draupadi Rohera (16 August 1998), "The sacred space of Justice Srikrishna", Sunday Times (discussing Justice Srikrishna's Hindu beliefs and his work with the commission).
- Suketu Mehta (2004), "Maximum City: Bombay lost and found", Wall Street Journal
