= B. N. Srikrishna =

Indian judge (born 1941)

Bellur Narayanaswamy Srikrishna

Judge of the Supreme Court of India
- In office 3 October 2002 – 21 May 2006
- Nominated by: Bhupinder Nath Kirpal
- Appointed by: A. P. J. Abdul Kalam

Chief Justice of the Kerala High Court
- In office 6 September 2001 – 1 October 2002

Personal details
- Born: 21 May 1941 (age 85) Bangalore, Kingdom of Mysore

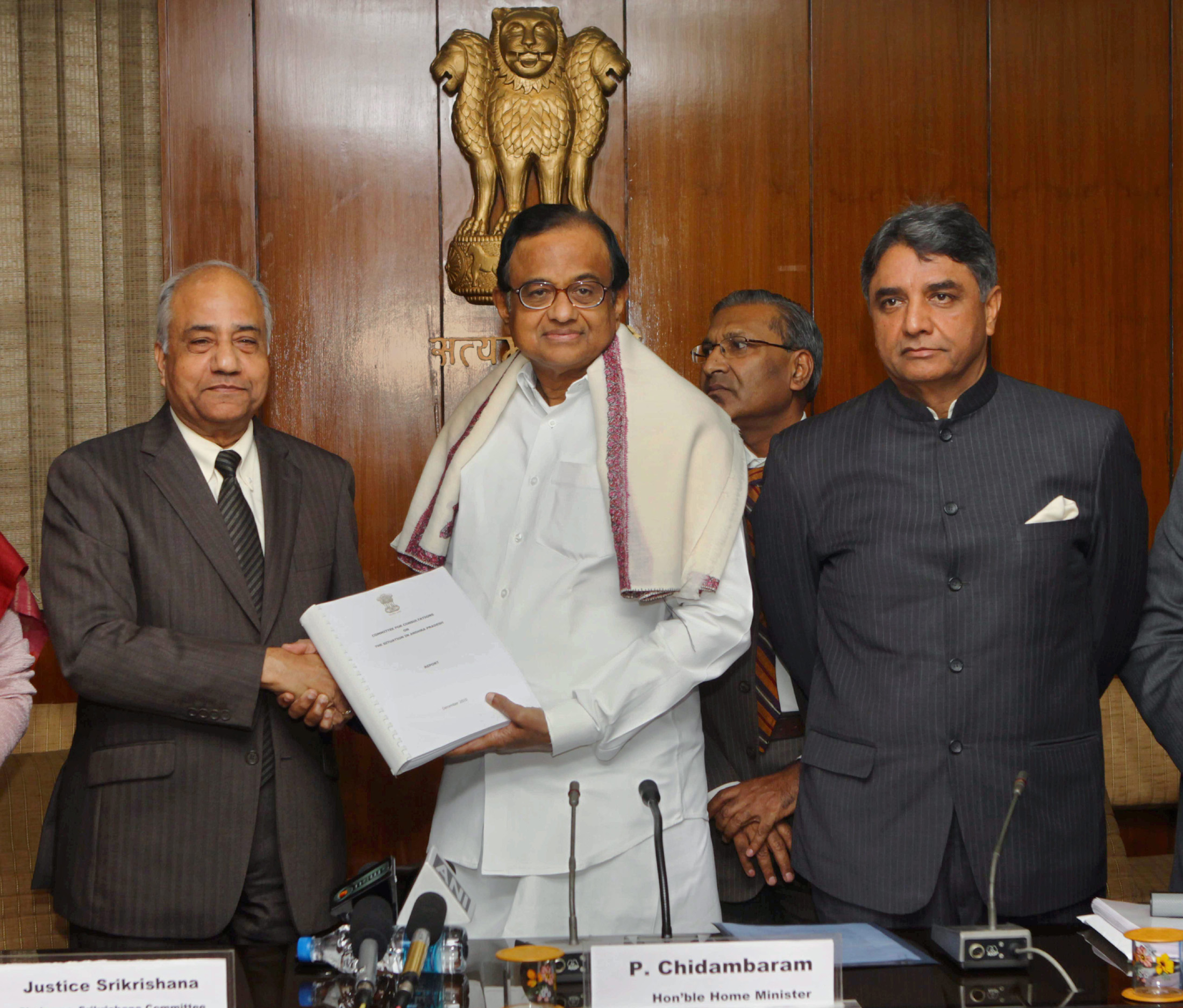
Srikrishna (left) holding the Srikrishna Committee Report

Bellur Narayanaswamy Srikrishna (born 21 May 1941) is an Indian jurist and a retired judge of the Supreme Court of India. From 1993 to 1998, he headed the Srikrishna Commission that investigated causes for the Bombay riots of 1992–93. In 2010, he headed the Srikrishna Committee that was constituted to look into the demand for separate statehood for Telangana. He is the chairman of the Financial Sector Legislative Reforms Commission (FSLRC) and also works as an independent arbitrator.

== Early life ==
Srikrishna was born in Bangalore, to B. Narayanaswamy and his wife, Sharadamma. His father, B. Narayanaswamy was a lawyer, practising at the Bombay High Court. Srikrishna was brought up in Bombay (now Mumbai) and graduated with a bachelor's degree in Science from the Elphinstone College of the University of Bombay, received a Bachelor of Laws from the Government Law College, Mumbai, a Master of Laws from the University of Bombay, and stood second in the university. In addition, he holds a Master of Arts degree in Sanskrit from the University of Mysore, a diploma in Urdu and a postgraduate diploma in Indian Aesthetics from the University of Bombay. He knows ten languages including his mother tongue, Kannada.

== Career ==
In 1967, Srikrishna entered commenced his practice at the Bombay High Court, specialising in labour and industrial law. He was engaged as a counsel for a number of large corporations. Besides appearing in the High Court, he also argued cases before the Supreme Court of India and was designated as a Senior Advocate in 1987.

Srikrishna was appointed as an additional judge of the Bombay High Court in 1990 and as a permanent judge in 1991. In 1993, he assumed charge of the Commission of Inquiry into the riots that took place in Bombay in 1992–93. The Srikrishna Commission submitted its report in 1998.

In September 2001, Srikrishna was appointed as the Chief Justice of the Kerala High Court and on 3 October 2002, he was appointed as a judge of the Supreme Court of India. On 21 May 2006, on reaching the age of superannuation of sixty-five years, he retired from the Supreme Court.

== Mumbai Riots 1992 case ==
The Bombay Riots usually refers to the riots in Mumbai, in December 1992 and January 1993, in which around 900 people died. The riots were mainly due to escalations of hostilities after large scale protests (which were initially peaceful, but eventually turned violent) by Muslims in reaction to the 1992 Babri Masjid Demolition by Hindu Karsevaks in Ayodhya. Srikrishna, then a judge of the Bombay High Court, accepted the task of investigating the causes of the riots. The Committee examined victims, witnesses, and alleged perpetrators for five years, until 1998. The commission was disbanded by the Shiv Sena-led government in January 1996. However, on public opposition, the committee was later reconstituted. In 1998, the Committee delivered its findings. However, as an inquiry is not a court of law, its report is not binding on governments. Thus, the recommendations cannot be directly enforced. To this date, the recommendations of the Commission have neither been accepted nor acted upon by the Government of Maharashtra.

== The Sixth Central Pay commission ==
The Sixth central pay commission was set up by Union Cabinet of India on 5 October 2006.Justice Srikrishna to head 6th pay panel– Rediff.com Business The commission, was headed by Srikrishna.

== Report on Madras High Court Riots ==
Srikrishna headed a one-man commission to inquire about the 19 February 2009 Madras High Court incidents. He submitted an interim report on 4 March 2009 with his findings to the Supreme Court of India.

He is interested in refugee law and human rights issues, and besides being a member of the International Association of Refugee Law Judges, has presented papers on the subject. He was invited by the United Nations High Commissioner for Refugees to Geneva for a seminar on New Forms of Persecution in 2000, and on the Justiciability of Economic, Social and Cultural rights to New Delhi in 2001.

His study of Indian Philosophy & Jurisprudence, has also published a number of articles on the subject, including an article on "Conflict and Harmony: The Genesis of Legal and Social Systems", which is published in the journal, History of Science and Philosophy of Science. He is on the editorial board of the Journal of the Indian Law Institute.

He is a Life Member of the National Institute of Personnel Management, is also associated with the Western Region Committee of the Employers Federation of India, the Industrial Relations Research Association (USA), and the International Bar Association (UK).

== Committee for separate Telangana ==
A five-member committee was constituted, with Srikrishna as the chairman, on 3 February 2010. The committee submitted its report 30 December 2010, recommending the creation of the state of Telangana. Other members of the committee were:

- Vinod Duggal – former Union Home Secretary
- Ravindar Kaur – professor at IIT Delhi
- Abusaleh Sharif – is a senior research fellow at the New Delhi Office of International Food Policy Research Institute
- Ranbir Singh - Vice-Chancellor, National Law University

== Committee to study issues related to data protection ==
In August 2017, the Union Ministry of Electronics & Information Technology (MEITY) constituted an Expert Committee to study and identify key data protection issues and recommend methods to address them. The ten-member committee was headed by Supreme Court Judge (retired) Justice B N Srikrishna and included members from government, academia, and industries. The committee also had the mandate to propose a draft bill for data protection.

The Committee released its Report and proposed Personal Data Protection Bill 2018 (India) in July 2018. The Draft was open for comments from the public until 10 October 2018.

== Personal life ==
Srikrishna is a connoisseur of art, culture, drama, and classical music, in general, and Carnatic music in particular. He tries to find time to pursue what he says is his "real passion" — Indian classical music and culture. He is married to Purnima and has two daughters, Sushma and Sowmya.

== Cultural activities ==
Mumbai has several cultural centers, and Srikrishna takes part during his free time. Srikrishna was the invited speaker, at the 2017 Golden Jubilee lecture at The Mysore association, Mumbai.

== Works ==
- Book on riot survivors released by Srikrishna in Mumbai, 2012,
- A Heritage of Judging: The Bombay High Court through One Hundred and Fifty Years. (Co-author)
- Skinning a Cat
- Indian judges.
- Foreword of Gujarat Files, self-published by Rana Ayyub.
