= Italian Data Protection Authority =

Italian data protection agency

Agency overview
- Formed: 1996
- Jurisdiction: Italy
- Headquarters: Rome, Italy
- Employees: 170
- Agency executive: Pasquale Stanzione, President
- Website: www.garanteprivacy.it

The Italian Data Protection Authority (Italian: Garante per la Protezione dei Dati Personali) is an agency of the Italian Government responsible for the protection of fundamental rights and freedoms and respect for dignity in the processing of personal data.

The authority is based in Rome, and from 2020 the authority is presided over by Pasquale Stanzione.
