= Vishram Patil murder case =

The Vishram Patil murder case gained national attention in India when the widow of the murder victim accused Pratibha Patil, the presidential nominee of the United Progressive Alliance, of shielding her brother, G. N. Patil, in relation to it.

== Murder ==
G. N. Patil was nominated by the Maharashtra Pradesh Congress Committee to be president of the District Congress Committee of Jalgaon in 2004. In 2005, an election by secret ballot was held for the position. He contested the election but lost to his opponent, V. G. Patil, by 13 votes.

Vishram Girdhar "V. G." Patil was a professor of English in a Jalgaon college that was affiliated to the North Maharashtra University. After his election, he instituted an enquiry into misappropriation of funds collected for felicitation of Pratibha Patil and for tsunami relief. On 21 September 2005, he was murdered near his house in broad daylight. The local police arrested two alleged assailants, Raju Mali and Raju Sonawane, but were then instructed by officials in Mumbai to transfer the case to the CID. In a letter to the police, Patil's widow, Rajani Patil, accused Ulhas Patil, a former Indian National Congress Member of Parliament from Jalagaon, and G. N. Patil as conspirators.

== High court order and CBI inquiry ==
In February 2007 the Aurangabad bench of Mumbai High Court acted on a petition from Rajani Patil, directing the Central Bureau of Investigation (CBI) to take over the probe from the CID. The judge stated in his ruling that:

We have scrutinized the entire record with the help of counsel for both sides. We have considered the chequered history of the present case, the developments which have taken place after filing of chargesheet, issues involved, and the reference to alleged conspiracy by the influential political leaders of the region. Having regard to the importance of issues involved and the alleged complicity of the influential political leaders referred to in paragraphs no. 3 and 4 of the petition, in our considered opinion, this is a fit case where the investigation should be conducted by the CBI.

A CBI team visited Jalgaon on 4 April 2007. Three days later, Raju Mali died in mysterious circumstances while in police custody.

On 23 June 2007 the district and sessions court of Jalgaon allowed the CBI to file the supplementary charge-sheet in the murder case against G. N. Patil.

== Murder case in media ==
The Hindi news channel AAJ TAK in October 2006 telecast a 20-minute investigative report on this murder case in its weekly programme ‘Hatyaara Kaun?’ (who is murderer). The report claimed that both G. N. Patil and Ulhas Patil had made numerous calls from their mobiles, before as well as on the day of murder, and that in September 2006, the two alleged assailants — Mali and Sonawane — went on an indefinite fast inside the Jalgaon district jail. Mali said, "We have been simply made scape goats in the case, whereas the real culprits are untouched."

== Allegation of shielding by Pratibha Patil ==
On 22 June 2007, Rajni Patil claimed in a NDA-facilitated press conference that her husband was murdered by Pratibha Patil's brother, G. N. Patil. She accused Pratibha Patil of shielding her brother. She further said that she had written to INC leader Sonia Gandhi and the President of India, Abdul Kalam, giving details of her allegation. Copies of her memorandum to Kalam were distributed to the press by Sudheendra Kulkarni, an aide to the BJP leader, L. K. Advani.

On 13 July 2007 Rajani Patil asked the court to insist that the CBI "interrogate" Pratibha Patil and her brother in connection with the case before the presidential poll on 19 July. She argued that if matters were left until after the election then Pratibha Patil might benefit from presidential immunity.

The lawyer Mahesh Jethmalani said that two CDs have surfaced which contain incriminating material against G. N. Patil. The CDs allegedly contain footage of the elections for the district Congress presidency in Jalgaon. Jethmalani offered to place both CDs on record, saying "These contain vital information showing the political link behind the murder."

=== Timeline and detailed quotes about allegation ===
On 22 June 2007, a press conference was organised at the residence of Sukhbir Singh Dhindsa, a leader of the Akali Dal which is member of the BJP-led NDA coalition.

BJP spokesman Ravi Shankar Prasad later told reporters:

These are all stark, important and disturbing facts much in existence even before she was considered as a candidate for the highest constitutional office of the country ... Therefore, consistent with the norms of dignity, transparency and constitutional propriety relating to such a high office, the BJP would like Pratibha Patil herself to satisfactorily reply to some of the most disturbing questions that have emerged from Rajni Patil's revelations.

The same day, the UPA refuted the allegations. Nagaland Post reported:

It is a matter that the CBI (Central Bureau of Investigation) is probing. Anyway, her brother's name was not in the FIR (first information report) nor in the charge sheet," said Pawar, former Maharashtra chief minister. Both ministers blamed the opposition National Democratic Alliance (NDA), of which the Akali Dal is a constituent, for the slur campaign against the presidential candidate. "I met Dhindsa in the morning and he said he did not have any idea about the press conference. Punjab Chief Minister Parkash Singh Badal was shocked to see how his colleague's house was being used for dirty politics," Pawar remarked. Referring to reports that Sudheendra Kulkarni, a former Prime Minister's Office (PMO) official, had brought the woman to the national capital, Pawar said: "It looks like NDA was behind it." Dasmunsi added: "The malign campaign by an ex-PMO official close to the former prime minister (Atal Bihari Vajpayee) is most unfortunate. It reflects their frustration and desperation and is a sign of their losing the election.

Sushma Swaraj, NDA spokesperson and BJP leader Sushma Swaraj clarified:

No one in the NDA knows who this Rajni Patil is who is reported to have made some allegation against Ms. Pratibha Patil.
