= Terrorist and Disruptive Activities (Prevention) Act, 1987 =

Repealed Indian legislation (1985–2000)

Parliament of India
- Long title: An Act to make special provisions for the prevention of, and for coping with, terrorist and disruptive activities and for matters connected therewith or incidental thereto.
- Citation: Act No. 28 of 1987
- Territorial extent: India
- Enacted by: Parliament of India
- Assented to: 3 September 1987
- Commenced: 24 May 1987

Amended by
- Act 16 of 1989, Act 43 of 1993
- Status: Repealed

Terrorist and Disruptive Activities (Prevention) Act, 1987, commonly known as TADA, was an Indian anti-terrorism law which was in force during the governments of Rajiv Gandhi and P.V. Narasimha Rao, between 1985 and 1995 (modified in 1987) amid the Punjab insurgency and applied to the whole of India. It was originally assented to by the President on 23 May 1985 and came into effect on 24 May 1985. This act was intended to halt the Khalistan Movement, an armed Sikh separatist movement present in Indian Punjab. It later expanded to encompass other states as well. The Act had a sunset provision for lapsing after two years post-commencement, which it did on 24 May 1987. The Parliament not being in session, the life of the Act could not be extended. But the provisions were kept alive by an ordinance effective from the expiry date of the Act. This ordinance was later replaced with the Terrorist and Disruptive Activities (Prevention) Act, 1987. It was assented to on 3 September 1987, and made effective in two parts from 24 May 1987 and 3 September 1987. This also had a sunset provision of two years from 24 May 1987. It was renewed in 1989, 1991 and 1993 before being allowed to lapse in 1995 due to increasing unpopularity after widespread allegations of abuse. It was the first anti-terrorism law legislated by the government to define and counter terrorist activities.

The Act's third paragraph gives a very thorough definition of "terrorism":

"Whoever with intent to overawe the Government as by law established or to strike terror in the people or any section of the people or to alienate any section of the people or to adversely affect the harmony amongst different sections of the people does any act or thing by using bombs, dynamite or other explosive substances or inflammable substances or lethal weapons or poisons or noxious gases or other chemicals or by any other substances (whether biological or otherwise) of a hazardous nature in such a manner as to cause, or as is likely to cause, death of, or injuries to, any person or persons or loss of, or damage to, or destruction of, property or disruption of any supplies or services essential to the life of the community, or detains any person and threatens to kill or injure such person in order to compel the Government or any other person to do or abstain from doing any act, commits a terrorist act."

== Powers ==
The law gave wide powers to law enforcement agencies for dealing with national terrorist and 'socially disruptive' activities. The police were not obliged to produce a detainee before a judicial magistrate within 24 hours. The accused person could be detained up to 1 year. Confessions made to police officers was admissible as evidence in the court of law, with the burden of proof being on the accused to prove his innocence. Courts were set up exclusively to hear the cases and deliver judgements pertaining to the persons accused under this Act. The trials could be held in camera with the identities of the witnesses kept hidden. Under 7A of the Act, Police officers were also empowered to attach the properties of the accused under this Act. Under this act police have no rights to give third degree or harassed anyone to speak as mentioned in the act.

== Criticism ==
The Act was widely criticised by human rights organisations as it contained provisions violating human rights. The criticism are centred on the following facts:

- Under the Act, whoever advocates directly or indirectly for cession or secession in any part of India is liable to be punished.
- The Act provides that a person can be detained up to one year without formal charges or trial against him.
- Section 20 of the Act provides that detainee can be in police custody up to 60 days, which increases the risk of torture. Also the detainee need not be produced before a judicial magistrate but instead may be produced before an executive magistrate, who is an official of police and administrative service and is not answerable to the high court.
- The trial can be held secretly at any place, with the identity of the witnesses being secret, which violates international standards of fair trials.
- The Act reverses the presumption of innocence of the accused under the Act. Under section 21 of the Act, the person who is accused of committing a terrorist act if arms and explosives were recovered or made confessions to someone other than a police officer or provided financial assistance for the commission of the terrorist act or by suspicion that the person has arms or explosives or financial assistance to commit the terrorist act, that person shall be presumed to be guilty unless the contrary is proved.
- Confessions to a police officer not below the rank of superintendent of the police can be used as evidence against a person.
- Section 19 of the Act bars appeals by persons accused under it except to the Supreme Court.

== Impact ==
The number of people arrested under the act had exceeded 76,000, by 30 June 1994. Twenty-five percent of these cases were dropped by the police without any charges being framed. Only 35 percent of the cases were brought to trial, of which 95 percent resulted in acquittals. Less than 2 percent of those arrested were convicted. The TADA act was ultimately repealed and succeeded by the Prevention of Terrorist Activities Act (2002-2004) and this act was subsequently repealed after much controversy as well. Yet many continue to be held under TADA.

== Supreme Court ruling ==
The Supreme Court has held that mere membership of a banned organisation does not make the member liable for the punishment under this Act.

== See also ==
- Anti-terrorism legislation

== Sources ==
- Zaidi, S. Hussain (2002). Black Friday – The True Story of the Bombay Bomb Blasts. Mumbai, India: Penguin Books. ISBN 978-0-14-302821-5..
