= List of accolades received by Gangubai Kathiawadi =

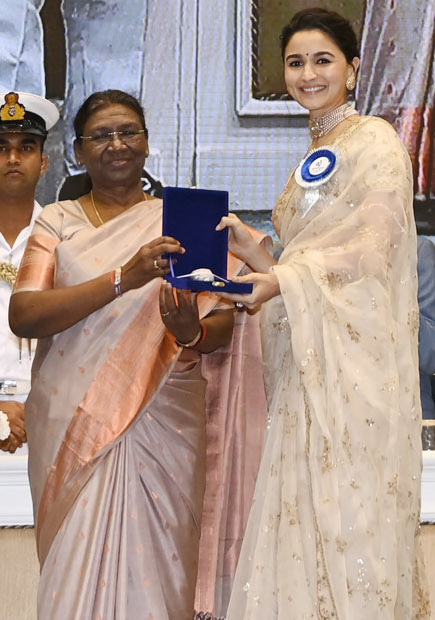
Alia Bhatt won several awards for playing the title role in Gangubai Kathiawadi

Gangubai Kathiawadi is a 2022 biographical film directed by Sanjay Leela Bhansali and starring Alia Bhatt in the title role of a young aspiring actress turned prostitute. Based on a chapter of Hussain Zaidi's book Mafia Queens of Mumbai, the screenplay was written by Bhansali and Utkarshini Vashishtha, with Prakash Kapadia also contributing to the dialogues. Bhansali also edited the film and composed its music.

At the 69th National Film Awards, Gangubai Kathiawadi won five awards, including Best Actress for Bhatt, Best Screenplay (Adapted) for Bhansali and Vashishtha, and Best Editing for Bhansali. At the 68th Filmfare Awards, the film received a leading 17 nominations and won a leading 11 awards, including Best Film, Best Director (Bhansali), and Best Actress (Bhatt).

== Accolades ==
Award	Date of the ceremony	Category	Recipients	Result	Ref.
Filmfare Awards	27 April 2023	Best Film	Gangubai Kathiawadi	Won	
Filmfare Awards	27 April 2023	Best Director	Sanjay Leela Bhansali	Won	
Filmfare Awards	27 April 2023	Best Actress	Alia Bhatt	Won	
Filmfare Awards	27 April 2023	Best Male Debut	Shantanu Maheshwari	Nominated	
Filmfare Awards	27 April 2023	Best Music Director	Sanjay Leela Bhansali	Nominated	
Filmfare Awards	27 April 2023	Best Lyricist	A. M. Turaz for “Jab Saiyaan”	Nominated	
Filmfare Awards	27 April 2023	Best Female Playback Singer	Janhvi Shrimankar for “Dholida”	Nominated	
Filmfare Awards	27 April 2023	Best Female Playback Singer	Shreya Ghoshal for “Jab Saiyaan”	Nominated	
Filmfare Awards	27 April 2023	Best Screenplay	Sanjay Leela Bhansali, Utkarshini Vashishtha	Nominated	
Filmfare Awards	27 April 2023	R. D. Burman Award	Janhvi Shrimankar for “Dholida”	Won	
Filmfare Awards	27 April 2023	Best Dialogue	Utkarshini Vashishtha, Prakash Kapadia	Won	
Filmfare Awards	27 April 2023	Best Art Direction	Subrata Chakraborty, Amit Ray	Won	
Filmfare Awards	27 April 2023	Best Choreography	Kruti Mahesh for “Dholida”	Won	
Filmfare Awards	27 April 2023	Best Cinematography	Sudeep Chatterjee	Won	
Filmfare Awards	27 April 2023	Best Sound Design	Sanal George	Won	
Filmfare Awards	27 April 2023	Best Background Score	Sanchit Balhara, Ankit Balhara	Won	
Filmfare Awards	27 April 2023	Best Costume Design	Sheetal Sharma	Won	
Indian Film Festival of Melbourne	14 August 2022	Best Film	Gangubai Kathiawadi	Nominated	
Indian Film Festival of Melbourne	14 August 2022	Best Director	Sanjay Leela Bhansali	Nominated	
Indian Film Festival of Melbourne	14 August 2022	Best Actress	Alia Bhatt	Nominated	
International Indian Film Academy Awards	26–27 May 2023	Best Actress	Alia Bhatt	Won	
International Indian Film Academy Awards	26–27 May 2023	Best Film	Gangubai Kathiawadi	Nominated	
International Indian Film Academy Awards	26–27 May 2023	Best Director	Sanjay Leela Bhansali	Nominated	
International Indian Film Academy Awards	26–27 May 2023	Best Supporting Actor	Vijay Raaz	Nominated	
International Indian Film Academy Awards	26–27 May 2023	Best Male Debut	Shantanu Maheshwari	Won	
International Indian Film Academy Awards	26–27 May 2023	Best Music Director	Sanjay Leela Bhansali	Nominated	
International Indian Film Academy Awards	26–27 May 2023	Best Lyricist	A. M. Turaz for “Jab Saiyaan”	Nominated	
International Indian Film Academy Awards	26–27 May 2023	Best Female Playback Singer	Shreya Ghoshal for “Jab Saiyaan”	Nominated	
International Indian Film Academy Awards	26–27 May 2023	Best Story	Hussain Zaidi, Jane Borges	Nominated	
International Indian Film Academy Awards	26–27 May 2023	Best Screenplay	Sanjay Leela Bhansali, Utkarshini Vashishtha	Won	
International Indian Film Academy Awards	26–27 May 2023	Best Dialogue	Prakash Kapadia, Utkarshini Vashishtha	Won	
International Indian Film Academy Awards	26–27 May 2023	Best Cinematography	Sudeep Chatterjee	Won	
Mirchi Music Awards	3 November 2023	Album of The Year (Listeners' Choice)	Gangubai Kathiawadi	Nominated	
Mirchi Music Awards	3 November 2023	Song of The Year (Listeners' Choice)	"Dholida"	Nominated	
Mirchi Music Awards	3 November 2023	Album of The Year	Gangubai Kathiawadi	Nominated	
Mirchi Music Awards	3 November 2023	Song of The Year	"Jab Saiyaan"	Nominated	
Mirchi Music Awards	3 November 2023	Song of The Year	"Dholida"	Nominated	
Mirchi Music Awards	3 November 2023	Female Vocalist of The Year	Shreya Ghoshal for “Jab Saiyaan”	Won	
Mirchi Music Awards	3 November 2023	Female Vocalist of The Year	Neeti Mohan for “Meri Jaan”	Nominated	
Mirchi Music Awards	3 November 2023	Female Vocalist of The Year	Janhvi Shrimankar for “Dholida”	Nominated	
Mirchi Music Awards	3 November 2023	Music Composer of The Year	Sanjay Leela Bhansali	Won	
Mirchi Music Awards	3 November 2023	Lyricist of The Year	A. M. Turaz for “Jab Saiyaan”	Nominated	
Mirchi Music Awards	3 November 2023	Best Song Producer - Programming & Arranging	Shail Hada for “Jab Saiyaan”	Nominated	
Mirchi Music Awards	3 November 2023	Best Song Producer - Programming & Arranging	Shail Hada for “Dholida”	Nominated	
Mirchi Music Awards	3 November 2023	Best Song Engineer - Recording & Mixing	Tanay Gajjar, Kunal Dabholkar for “Jab Saiyaan”	Nominated	
Mirchi Music Awards	3 November 2023	Best Background Music Score	Sanchit Balhara, Ankit Balhara	Nominated	
National Film Awards	24 August 2023	Best Actress	Alia Bhatt (tied with Kriti Sanon for Mimi)	Won	
National Film Awards	24 August 2023	Best Screenplay (Adapted)	Sanjay Leela Bhansali, Utkarshini Vashishtha	Won	
National Film Awards	24 August 2023	Best Screenplay (Dialogue)	Utkarshini Vashishtha, Prakash Kapadia	Won	
National Film Awards	24 August 2023	Best Editing	Sanjay Leela Bhansali	Won	
National Film Awards	24 August 2023	Best Makeup	Preetishsheel Singh D'Souza	Won	
Zee Cine Awards	26 February 2023	Best Film	Gangubai Kathiawadi	Nominated	
Zee Cine Awards	26 February 2023	Best Film (Critics)	Gangubai Kathiawadi	Nominated	
Zee Cine Awards	26 February 2023	Best Director	Sanjay Leela Bhansali	Nominated	
Zee Cine Awards	26 February 2023	Best Actress	Alia Bhatt	Nominated	
Zee Cine Awards	26 February 2023	Best Actress (Critics)	Alia Bhatt	Won	
Zee Cine Awards	26 February 2023	Best Music Director	Sanjay Leela Bhansali	Nominated	
Zee Cine Awards	26 February 2023	Best Lyricist	A. M. Turaz for “Jab Saiyaan”	Nominated	
Zee Cine Awards	26 February 2023	Best Female Playback Singer	Shreya Ghoshal for “Jab Saiyaan”	Nominated	
Zee Cine Awards	26 February 2023	Best Dialogue	Prakash Kapadia, Utkarshini Vashishtha	Won	
Zee Cine Awards	26 February 2023	Best Costume Design	Sheetal Sharma	Won	
Zee Cine Awards	26 February 2023	Best Production Design	Subrata Chakraborty, Amit Ray	Won	
Reel Awards	26 February 2023	Best Film	Gangubai Kathiawadi	Nominated	
Reel Awards	26 February 2023	Best Director	Sanjay Leela Bhansali	Nominated	
Reel Awards	26 February 2023	Best Actress	Alia Bhatt	Nominated	
Reel Awards	26 February 2023	Best Performance in a Negative Role	Vijay Raaz	Nominated	
Reel Awards	26 February 2023	Best Female Playback Singer	Neeti Mohan for “Meri Jaan”	Nominated	
Reel Awards	26 February 2023	Best Music	Sanjay Leela Bhansali	Nominated	
Reel Awards	26 February 2023	Best Debut	Shantanu Maheshwari	Won	
