= 69th National Film Awards =

Indian ceremony celebrating cinema of 2021

- Awarded for: Best of Indian cinema in 2021
- Awarded by: NFDC
- Presented by: Droupadi Murmu (President of India)
- Announced on: 24 August 2023
- Presented on: 17 October 2023
- Official website: www.nfdcindia.com

Highlights
- Best Feature Film: Rocketry: The Nambi Effect
- Best Non-Feature Film: Ek Tha Gaon
- Best Book: Music by Laxmikant Pyarelal: The Incredibly Melodious Journey
- Best Film Critic: Purushothama Charyulu
- Dadasaheb Phalke Award: Waheeda Rehman
- Most awards: RRR (14)

The 69th National Film Awards ceremony was an event during which the National Film Development Corporation of India presented its annual National Film Awards to honour the best films of 2022 in Indian cinema. The awards ceremony was originally slated to be held on 3 May 2021 but was postponed due to delays after the COVID-19 pandemic. The winners were announced on 1 August 2022, by the Ministry of Information and Broadcasting in a press conference. The winners along with the Dadasaheb Phalke Award recipient were felicitated by the President, Droupadi Murmu on 6 October 2022 at the Vigyan Bhawan, New Delhi.

== Selection process ==
The National Film Development Corporation of India invited online entries on 31 March 2023 with the acceptable last date for entries until 10 May 2023. Feature and Non-Feature Films certified by the Central Board of Film Certification between 1 January 2021, and 31 December 2021, were eligible for the film award categories. Books, critical studies, reviews or articles on cinema published in Indian newspapers, magazines, and journals between 1 January 2021, and 31 December 2021, were eligible for the best writing on cinema section. Entries of dubbed, revised or copied versions of a film or translation, abridgements, edited or annotated works and reprints were ineligible for the awards.

For the feature and non-feature Films sections, films in any Indian language, shot on 16 mm, 35 mm, a wider film gauge or a digital format, and released in cinemas, on video or digital formats for home viewing were eligible. Films were required to be certified as a feature film, a featurette or a Documentary/Newsreel/Non-Fiction by the Central Board of Film Certification.

== Dadasaheb Phalke Award ==
Introduced in 1969, the Dadasaheb Phalke Award is India's highest award in the field of cinema given to recognise the contributions of film personalities towards the development of Indian cinema and for distinguished contributions to the medium, its growth and promotion. The recipient is awarded with 'Golden Lotus Award' (Swarna Kamal), cash prize of ₹1 million (US$10,000) and a shawl. The 2021 recipient is Waheeda Rehman.

A committee consisting five eminent personalities from Indian film industry was appointed to evaluate the lifetime achievement award, Dadasaheb Phalke Award. Following were the jury members:

- Jury Members

• Asha Parekh
• Chiranjeevi
• Paresh Rawal
• Shekhar Kapur
• Prosenjit Chatterjee

Award	Image	Awardee(s)	Awarded As	Cash prize
Dadasaheb Phalke Award		Waheeda Rehman	Actress	₹1,000,000 (US$10,000)

== Feature films ==
=== Golden Lotus Awards ===
Official Name: Swarna Kamal

All the awardees are awarded with 'Golden Lotus Award (Swarna Kamal)', a certificate and cash prize.

Award	Film	Language	Awardee(s)	Cash prize
Best Feature Film	Rocketry: The Nambi Effect	Hindi	Director: R. Madhavan	₹250,000
Best Direction	Godavari	Marathi	Nikhil Mahajan	₹250,000
Best Popular Film Providing Wholesome Entertainment	RRR	Telugu	Producer: D. V. V. Danayya; Director: S. S. Rajamouli	₹200,000 each
Best Children's Film	Gandhi & Co.	Gujarati	Producer: MD Media Corp; Director: Manish Saini	₹150,000 each
Best Debut Film of a Director	Meppadiyan	Malayalam	Producer: Unni Mukundan; Director: Vishnu Mohan	₹125,000 each

=== Silver Lotus Award ===
Official Name: Rajat Kamal

All the awardees are awarded with 'Silver Lotus Award (Rajat Kamal)', a certificate and cash prize.

Award	Film	Language	Awardee(s)	Cash prize
Best Feature Film on National Integration	The Kashmir Files	Hindi	Producer: Abhishek Agarwal Arts; Director: Vivek Agnihotri	₹150,000 each
Best Film on Environment Conservation/Preservation	Aavasavyuham	Malayalam	Producer and Director: Krishand	₹150,000 each
Best Film on Other Social Issues	Anunaad – The Resonance	Assameese	Producer: Assam State Film Corporation; Director: Reema Borah	₹150,000 each
Best Actor	Pushpa: The Rise	Telugu	Allu Arjun	₹50,000
Best Actress	Gangubai Kathiawadi	Hindi	Alia Bhatt	₹50,000 each
Best Actress	Mimi	Hindi	Kriti Sanon	₹50,000 each
Best Supporting Actor	Mimi	Hindi	Pankaj Tripathi	₹50,000
Best Supporting Actress	The Kashmir Files	Hindi	Pallavi Joshi	₹50,000
Best Child Artist	Chhello Show	Gujarati	Bhavin Rabari	₹50,000
Best Male Playback Singer	RRR (For the song "Komuram Bheemudo")	Telugu	Kaala Bhairava	₹50,000
Best Female Playback Singer	Iravin Nizhal (For the song "Mayava Chayava")	Telugu/Tamil	Shreya Ghoshal	₹50,000
Best Cinematography	Sardar Udham	Hindi	Avik Mukhopadhyay	₹50,000
Best Screenplay • Screenplay Writer (Original)	Nayattu	Malayalam	Shahi Kabir	₹50,000
Best Screenplay • Screenplay Writer (Adapted)	Gangubai Kathiawadi	Hindi	Sanjay Leela Bhansali; Utkarshini Vashishtha	₹50,000
Best Screenplay • Dialogues	Gangubai Kathiawadi	Hindi	Utkarshini Vashishtha; Prakash Kapadia	₹50,000
Best Audiography • Location Sound Recordist	Chavittu	Malayalam	Arun Asok; Sonu KP	₹50,000
Best Audiography • Sound Designer	Jhilli	Bengali	Aneesh Basu	₹50,000
Best Audiography • Re-recordist of the Final Mixed Track	Sardar Udham	Hindi	Sinoy Joseph	₹50,000
Best Music Direction • Songs	Pushpa: The Rise	Telugu	Devi Sri Prasad	₹50,000
Best Music Direction • Background Score	RRR	Telugu	M. M. Keeravani	₹50,000
Best Editing	Gangubai Kathiawadi	Hindi	Sanjay Leela Bhansali	₹50,000
Best Production Design	Sardar Udham	Hindi	Dmitri Malich-Konkov; Mansi Dhruv Mehta	₹50,000
Best Costume Design	Sardar Udham	Hindi	Veera Kapur Ee	₹50,000
Best Make-up Artist	Gangubai Kathiawadi	Hindi	Preetisheel Singh D'Souza	₹50,000
Best Lyrics	Konda Polam	Telugu	Chandrabose ("Dham Dham Dham")	₹50,000
Best Special Effects	RRR	Telugu	V. Srinivas Mohan	₹50,000
Best Choreography	RRR	Telugu	Prem Rakshith ("Naatu Naatu")	₹50,000
Best Stunt Choreographer	RRR	Telugu	King Solomon	₹50,000
Special Jury Award	Shershaah	Hindi	Producer: Karan Johar, Dharma Productions; Director: Vishnuvardhan	₹2,00,000 each
Special Mention	Nallandi; Aranya & Bithan; Indrans; Jahanara Begum	Tamil; Bengali; Malayalam; Assamese	Kadaisi Vivasayi; Jhilli; Home; Anur	Certificate only

=== Regional awards ===
National Film Awards are also given to the best films in the regional languages of India. Awards for the regional languages are categorised as per their mention in the Eighth schedule of the Constitution of India. Awardees included producers and directors of the film. No films in languages other than those specified in the Schedule VIII of the Constitution were eligible.

Award	Film	Awardee(s)		Cash prize
Award	Film	Producer	Director	Cash prize
Best Feature Film in Assamese	Anur	Gopendra Mohan Das	Monjul Baruah	₹1,00,000 each
Best Feature Film in Bengali	Kalkokkho	Anjan Bose	Rajdeep Paul, Sarmistha Maiti	₹1,00,000 each
Best Feature Film in Gujarati	Chhello Show	Pan Nalin, Dheer Momaya, Siddharth Roy Kapur, Marc Duale	Pan Nalin	₹1,00,000 each
Best Feature Film in Hindi	Sardar Udham	Ronnie Lahiri, Sheel Kumar	Shoojit Sircar	₹1,00,000 each
Best Feature Film in Kannada	777 Charlie	G. S. Gupta, Rakshit Shetty	Kiranraj K.	₹1,00,000 each
Best Feature Film in Maithili	Samanantar	Niraj Kumar Mishra, Atul Pandey	Niraj Kumar Mishra	₹1,00,000 each
Best Feature Film in Malayalam	Home	Vijay Babu	Rojin Thomas	₹1,00,000 each
Best Feature Film in Manipuri	Eikhoigi Yum	Romi Meitei & Chingsubam Sheetal	Romi Meitei	₹1,00,000 each
Best Feature Film in Marathi	Ekda Kaay Zala	Saleel Kulkarni, Siddharth Mahadevan, Soumil Shringarpure, Siddharth Khinvasara, Soumendu Kuber, Arundhati Datye, Anoop Nimkar, Nitin Prakash Vaidya	Saleel Kulkarni	₹1,00,000 each
Best Feature Film in Odia	Pratikshya	Anupam Patnaik	Anupam Patnaik	₹1,00,000 each
Best Feature Film in Tamil	Kadaisi Vivasayi	M. Manikandan	M. Manikandan	₹1,00,000 each
Best Feature Film in Telugu	Uppena	Naveen Yerneni, Y. Ravi Shankar	Buchi Babu Sana	₹1,00,000 each

== Non-Feature films ==
Non-feature films made in any Indian language and certified by the Central Board of Film Certification as a documentary/newsreel/fiction are eligible for non-feature film section.

=== Golden Lotus Award ===
Official Name: Swarna Kamal

All the awardees are awarded with 'Golden Lotus Award (Swarna Kamal)', a certificate and cash prize.

Award	Film	Language	Awardee(s)	Cash prize
Best Non-Feature Film	Ek Tha Gaon		Producer & Director: Srishti Lakhera	₹1,50,000 each
Best Director of Non-Feature Film	Smile Please	Hindi	Bakul Matiyani	₹1,50,000

=== Silver Lotus Award ===
Official Name: Rajat Kamal

All the Awardees are awarded with 'Silver Lotus Award (Rajat Kamal)' and cash prize.

Award	Film	Language	Awardee(s)	Cash prize
Best Debut Non-Feature Film of A Director	Paanchika		Producer: Shreya Kapadiya; Director: Ankit Kothari	₹ 75,000/- each
Best Biographical Film	Beyond Blast	Manipuri	Producer: Konjengbam Sushila Leima Director: Saikhom Ratan	₹ 50,000/- each
Best Biographical Film	Rukhu Matir Dukhu Majhi	Bengali	Producer: Somnath Mondal; Director: Somnath Mondal	₹ 50,000/- each
Best Arts / Cultural Film	T. N. Krishnan Bow Strings to Divine		Producer: National Film Development Corporation of India; Director: V. Packirisamy	₹ 50,000/- each
Best Environment Film	Munnam Valavu	Malayalam	Producer: Sree Gokulam Movies; Director: R S Pradeep	₹ 50,000/- each
Best Promotional Film	Endangered Heritage		Producer: Baba Cinemas; Director: Hemant Verma	₹ 50,000/- each
Best Film on Social Issues	Mithu Di		Producer: Asim Kumar Sinha; Director: Asim Kumar Sinha	₹150,000 each
Best Film on Social Issues	Three Two One		Producer: Film and Television Institute of India; Director: Himanshu Prajapati	₹150,000 each
Best Educational Film	Sirpigalin Sirpangal	Tamil	Producer: KKV Media Venture; Director: B. Lenin	₹ 50,000/- each
Best Ethnographic Film			Producer: Director:	₹ 50,000/- each
Best Exploration Film	Ayushman	English; Kannada	Producer: Mathew Varghese; Dinesh Rajkumar N. Naveen Francis; Director: Jacob Verghese	₹50,000/- each
Best Investigative Film	Looking for Challan	English	Producer: IGNCA; Director: Bappa Ray	₹50,000/- each
Best Animation Film	Kandittundu	Malayalam	Producer: Studio Eeksaurus Productions Pvt. Ltd. Director: Adithi Krishnadas	₹50,000/-
Best Short Fiction Film	Dal Bhat	Gujarati	Producer & Director: Nemil Shah	₹50,000/- each
Best Film on Family Values	Chand Saanse	Hindi	Producer: Chandrakant Kulkarni; Director: Pratima Joshi	₹50,000/- each
Best Cinematography	Pataal-Tee	Bhotiya	Bittu Rawat	₹50,000/- each
Best Audiography	Ek Tha Gaon	Garhwali; Hindi	Re-recordist: Krishnanunni N R	₹50,000/-
Best Location Sound Recordist (Location/Sync Sound)	Meen Raag	Rajasthani	Production Sound Recordist: Suruchi Sharma	₹50,000/-
Best Editing	If Memory Serves Me Right	English	Abhro Banerjee	₹50,000/-
Best Music Direction	Succulent	Hindi; English; Marathi	Ishaan Divecha	₹50,000/-
Best Narration / Voice Over	Hati Bondhu	English; Assamese	Kulada Kumar Bhattacharjee	₹50,000/-
Special Jury Award	Rekha	Marathi	Shekhar Bapu Rankhambe	₹1,00,000/-
Special Mention Award	Karuvarai	Tamil	Ganesh Babu, Srikanth Deva	
