= Gangubai =

- Gender: female

Origin
- Origin: Karnataka, India

Gangubai is a female name in the Indian subcontinent.

- Gangubai Hangal, Gangubai Hangal ( Hindi: गंगुबाई हंगल) a Noted Indian classical singer of the Kirana Gharana.
- Saloni Daini, a.k.a. 'Gangubai' 8 year old Indian Comedy Star, famous for her Gangubai act
- Gangubai Kothewali (1939-2008), a former brothel owner in Mumbai

== See also ==
- Gangubai Kathiawadi, a film based on the life of Gangubai Katiawadi
