= Anur (film) =

- Release poster
- Directed by: Monjul Baruah
- Based on: Bhal Poar Xomoi by Anuradha Sharma Pujari
- Starring: Rajat Kapoor; Jahanara Begum
- Cinematography: Sumon Dowerah
- Edited by: Twenchang
- Music by: Tarali Sarma
- Release date: 27 January 2023
- Running time: 162 minutes
- Country: India
- Language: Assamese

Anur (transl. Eyes on the Sunshine) is a 2023 Indian Assamese-language film directed by Monjul Baruah based on the short story Bhal Poar Xomoi by Anuradha Sharma Pujari. The film stars Rajat Kapoor, Jahanara Begum, Boloram Das and Rajashree. It premiered at the International Film Festival of Kerala in 2022 and won the National Film Award for Best Feature Film in Assamese at India's 69th National Film Awards.

== Cast ==
- Rajat Kapoor
- Jahanara Begum
- Boloram Das
- Rajashree Sharma
- Udayan Duarah
- Bibhuti Bhushan Hazarika
- Bidya Bharati

== Reception ==
Kalpa Jyoti Bhuyan from The News Maill wrote "The audience who are old enough to be peering through the binoculars of time, noting how distant the past appears, and wondering when and how their last day will arrive will be the ones most affected by ‘Anur – Eyes on the Sunshine’". Prathajit Baruah from North East Film Journal says "The scene in which Anupama's son is shown driving a car with his little daughter in a foreign nation may infuriate the audience because the filmmaker ould have used enormous canvas to illustrate the scene. Anur, a film about loneliness and love in old age, will captivate audiences with its unique perspective".
