= Filmfare Award for Best Dialogue =

Annual award for Hindi films

- Awarded for: Best Performance by a Dialogue Writer
- Country: India
- Presented by: Filmfare
- First award: Rajinder Singh Bedi, Madhumati (1959)
- Currently held by: Sneha Desai; Laapataa Ladies (2025
- Website: Filmfare Awards

The Filmfare Best Dialogue Award is given by the Filmfare magazine as part of its annual Filmfare Awards for Hindi films. Here is a list of the award winners since 1958 and the films for which they won.

== Superlatives ==
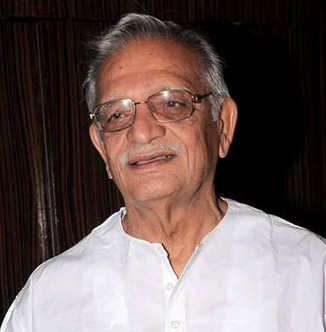
Gulzar holds the record of maximum wins in this category.

Wins	Recipient
4	Gulzar, Rajkumar Hirani
3	Rahi Masoom Raza, Aditya Chopra, Abhijat Joshi
2	Wajahat Mirza, Rajinder Singh Bedi, Akhtar ul Iman, Javed Akhtar, Kader Khan

Achla Nagar, Juhi Chaturvedi, and Ishita Moitra are the only women to have won the award for Best Dialogue, winning for Nikaah, Gulabo Sitabo, and Rocky Aur Rani Kii Prem Kahaani respectively.

== List ==
Year	Winner	Film
2025	Sneha Desai	Laapataa Ladies
2024	Ishita Moitra	Rocky Aur Rani Kii Prem Kahaani
2023	Prakash Kapadia & Utkarshini Vashishtha	Gangubai Kathiawadi
2022	Dibakar Banerjee & Varun Grover	Sandeep aur Pinky Faraar
2021	Juhi Chaturvedi	Gulabo Sitabo
2020	Vijay Maurya	Gully Boy
2019	Akshat Ghildial	Badhaai Ho
2018	Hitesh Kewaliya	Shubh Mangal Saavdhan
2017	Ritesh Shah	Pink
2016	Himanshu Sharma	Tanu Weds Manu Returns
2015	Rajkumar Hirani & Abhijat Joshi	PK
2014	Subhash Kapoor	Jolly LLB
2013	Anurag Kashyap, Zeishan Quadri, Abhishek Jaiswal & Sachin Ladia	Gangs of Wasseypur
2012	Farhan Akhtar	Zindagi Na Milegi Dobara
2011	Habib Faisal	Do Dooni Chaar
2010	Rajkumar Hirani & Abhijat Joshi	3 Idiots
2009	Manu Rishi	Oye Lucky! Lucky Oye!
2008	Imtiaz Ali	Jab We Met
2007	Rajkumar Hirani & Abhijat Joshi	Lage Raho Munnabhai
2006	Prakash Jha	Apaharan
2005	Aditya Chopra	Veer-Zaara
2004	Abbas Tyrewala	Munnabhai M.B.B.S.
2003	Gulzar; Jaideep Sahni	Saathiya; Company
2002	Karan Johar	Kabhi Khushi Kabhie Gham
2001	O. P. Dutta	Refugee
2000	Hriday Lani	Sarfarosh
1999	Rajkumar Santoshi & K.K. Raina	Chinagate
1998	Aditya Chopra	Dil To Pagal Hai
1997	Gulzar	Maachis
1996	Aditya Chopra, Javed Siddiqi	Dilwale Dulhania Le Jayenge
1995	K. K. Singh	Krantiveer
1994	Prof. Jay Dixit	Sir
1993	Kader Khan	Angaar
1992	Rahi Masoom Reza	Lamhe
1991	Suraj Sanim	Daddy
1990	Javed Akhtar	Main Azaad Hoon
1989	Kamlesh Pandey	Tezaab
1986	Rahi Masoom Reza	Tawaif
1985	Sai Paranjpye	Sparsh
1984	Mahesh Bhatt	Arth
1983	Achla Nagar	Nikaah
1982	Kader Khan	Meri Aawaz Suno
1981	Shabd Kumar	Insaaf Ka Tarazu
1980	Pt. Satyadev Dubey	Junoon
1979	Rahi Masoom Reza	Main Tulsi Tere Aangan Ki
1978	Vrajendra Gaur	Dulhan Wahi Jo Piya Man Bhaye
1977	Sagar Sarhadi	Kabhi Kabhie
1976	Salim–Javed	Deewaar
1975	Kaifi Azmi	Garam Hawa
1974	Gulzar	Namak Haraam
1973	Ramesh Pant	Amar Prem
1972	Gulzar	Anand
1971	Rajinder Singh Bedi	Satyakam
1970	Pt. Anand Kumar	Anokhi Raat
1969	S. Ali Raza	Saraswatichandra
1968	Manoj Kumar	Upkar
1967	Vijay Anand	Guide
1966	Akhtar ul Iman	Waqt
1965	Govind Moonis	Dosti
1964	Arjun Dev Rashk	Dil Ek Mandir
1963	Akhtar ul Iman	Dharmputra
1962	Wajahat Mirza	Ganga Jamuna
1961	Aman, Kamal Amrohi, Wajahat Mirza, Ehsan Rizvi	Mughal-e-Azam
1960	Ramanand Sagar	Paigham
1959	Rajinder Singh Bedi	Madhumati

== See also ==
- Filmfare Award
- Bollywood
- Cinema of India
