= O'Romeo =

2026 Indian film by Vishal Bhardwaj

- Theatrical release poster
- Directed by: Vishal Bhardwaj
- Screenplay by: Vishal Bhardwaj; Rohan Narula
- Dialogues by: Vishal Bhardwaj
- Story by: Hussain Zaidi
- Based on: Mafia Queens of Mumbai by Hussain Zaidi
- Produced by: Sajid Nadiadwala
- Starring: Shahid Kapoor; Triptii Dimri; Nana Patekar; Avinash Tiwary; Tamannaah Bhatia; Disha Patani; Farida Jalal; Aruna Irani; Rahul Deshpande
- Cinematography: Ben Bernhard
- Edited by: Aarif Sheikh
- Music by: Vishal Bhardwaj
- Production companies: Nadiadwala Grandson Entertainment; VB Pictures
- Distributed by: Pen Marudhar
- Release date: 13 February 2026
- Running time: 178 minutes
- Country: India
- Language: Hindi
- Budget: 150 crore
- Box office: est. ₹123.10 crore

O'Romeo is a 2026 Indian Hindi-language romantic action thriller film written and directed by Vishal Bhardwaj. Produced by Sajid Nadiadwala for Nadiadwala Grandson Entertainment with VB Pictures, it is partially based on the non-fiction book Mafia Queens of Mumbai by Hussain Zaidi. The film stars Shahid Kapoor, Triptii Dimri, Nana Patekar, Avinash Tiwary and Farida Jalal, with Tamannaah, Vikrant Massey and Disha Patani in special appearances.

Principal photography began in January 2025 and took place primarily in Mumbai and Spain. O' Romeo was released on 13 February 2026, coinciding with the Valentine's Day weekend, and received mixed reviews from critics.

== Plot ==
Ustara is a feared gangster and hitman in 1995 Bombay who kills his targets using a barber's razor. Ismail Khan, an intelligence officer who had saved Ustara from Jalal, a gangster established in Spain after Ustara killed Jalal's brother Mohsin a long time ago, has been using Ustara as a covert operative for himself since. Ismail gives Ustara the contract of killing Jayesh Duggal, Jalal's financier. Ustara finds Duggal in a theater and takes down a swarm of bald bodyguards. Just as Duggal is about to escape, Ismail enters and kills him. Fed up of working for Ismail, Ustara plans on escaping to Fiji. Ustara then meets Afshan, a widow, who wants him to kill Inspector Pathare, Ansari, Shankar and Jalal. But Ustara refuses and humiliates her.

It is revealed that her childhood love and husband, Billu, began working in Jalal's gang for money. After Afshan tells him to leave the gang, Billu attempted to do so, but Shankar and Pathare killed him. Advocate Ansari fabricated fake evidence and framed Billu as a dangerous criminal and Pathare as an honest officer, thus leaving Afshan no choice but to take matters in her own hands.

A few days later, Afshan steals Ustara's gun and unsuccessfully attempts to kill Inspector Pathare at a cafe, but then finds Ansari alone in the cafe washroom and points her gun at him, but Ansari deceives her, grabbing her gun, and as he is about to kill her, Ustara enters and slits his throat.

Ustara, upon seeing her conviction, cancels his plan to escape India and decides to help Afshan. With time Afshan and Ustara bond, and he falls in love with her, but as Afshan is scared and reluctant to pursue her quest for revenge further, Ustara motivates her and trains her in combat and shooting. Ismail orders Ustara to help seize Jalal's upcoming drug shipment in Kathmandu, Nepal. Ustara, Afshan, and the gang leave for the mission to seize Jalal's docket, but the gang is trapped and caught by Jalal's men, and several of Ustara's gang members are killed. After Afshan helps the gang to escape, Ustara cremates his dead men, and confesses his love to her.

The next day, Ustara finds Afshan missing, and Jalal orders his men to double the drug production, as Jayesh Duggal, the financer who could have helped them cope with the losses, had been killed by Ustara as well. Jalal's wife Rabia is revealed to be psychologically unstable after losing her child, for which Jalal considers Ustara responsible. As Jalal has recently suffered a huge loss and has speeded up the drug work to cope, Ismail suggests Ustara that it would be a great time to attack Jalal's drug factory and eradicate Jalal's drug empire in India. In return, Ustara asks for Ismail's help to find Afshan.

A few days later, enraged by still not finding Afshan, without consulting Ismail, Ustara singly handedly storms and burns down Jalal's drug factory. Enraged, Jalal orders Pathare and Shankar to kill Ustara within a week. Ismail, worried about what might happen to Ustara orders him to leave the country. Meanwhile, Ustara learns that Afshan has been secretly working with Ismail and has been acting as Pathare's wife under the false name "Rani Sharma" to get close to Shankar. One day, amidst the chaos of Ganesh Chaturthi, Afshan kills Shankar.

Pathare, further enraged by Shankar's death, follows Ismail in hope of finding Ustara whenever the two meet. Ismail enters a local train to meet Afshan. Pathare gathers his team on the next station to illegally encounter Ustara. Ustara gets tipped about Ismail and Afshan's meeting and Pathare's plan by his men, and frightened that Afshan's identity might be revealed to Pathare, he enters the train to warn the two. But before Ustara can explain, the situation heats up and Ustara and Ismail have to act as bait in order to let Afshan escape.

Pathare enters the train, leading to a shootout in which both Ismail and Ustara are shot and brutally injured. Pathare takes his wife, Rani Sharma, in reality a disguised Afshan, to Jalal's carnival in Portugal for a honeymoon. There, she tries to kill Jalal but gets caught, as Pathare had found her ID from Ismail's pocket during the shootout and knew her true identity all along. Jalal then forces Afshan to kill Pathare for his mess, and imprisons her.

A few months later, Ustara invades Jalal's palace and encounters Rabia while killing his bodyguards. It is revealed that a few years ago, it was the then pregnant Rabia, who had informed Ismail about Jalal's terrorism plans with the ISI; however, she accidentally shot Mohsin dead in a state of commotion after he caught her redhanded. The trauma caused Rabia to lose her unborn baby in a stillbirth; in order to save her, Ustara had taken the blame and had fled with Ismail's help. Back in the present, Rabia sides with Ustara out of gratitude and hands over the keys and directions to Afshan's cell. Rabia flees the scene and arrives at Jalal's bullfighting arena, while Ustara reunites with Afshan and subsequently kills Jalal's men in a shootout, then enter the arena with his gang members.

One of Jalal's henchmen who had survived Ustara's ambush informs him about Rabia's truth on a phone, and an enraged Jalal confronts the unstable Rabia and beheads her. In the arena, Ustara and Jalal fight, and Ustara brutally injures Jalal with his razors, and Afshan takes his life with a sword.

The film ends with Afshan becoming a classical music teacher like her father and a hospitalized Ismail reminding Ustara that until all drug lords like Jalal are finished, Ustara shall always dance on his orders.

== Cast ==
- Shahid Kapoor as Ustara
- Triptii Dimri as Afshan Qureshi / Rani Sharma
- Nana Patekar as DCP Ismail Khan
- Avinash Tiwary as Jalaluddin "Jalal" Shah
- Tamannaah Bhatia as Rabia Jalaluddin Shah (special appearance)
- Vikrant Massey as Mehmood "Billu" Qureshi (special appearance)
- Disha Patani as Julie (special appearance)
- Aruna Irani as Brothel Owner (special appearance)
- Farida Jalal as Dadi
- Hussain Dalal as Chhotu
- Rahul Deshpande as Inspector Pathare
- Rohit Pathak as Shankar
- Resh Lamba as Anjum Ansari
- Shaurya Shah as Meerasi
- Allauddin Khan as Bhagheera
- Gourav Sharma as Ram
- Goutam Sharma as Shyam
- Sarthak Khurana as Anwar Ali
- Ajay Jadhav as matchmaker
- Roshni Walia as Roshni Chopra
- Natasha Bharadwaj as Nargis

== Production ==
In August 2017, it was reported that Deepika Padukone and Irrfan were cast to play the lead roles in the film. Director Honey Trehan was earlier slated to direct the film, but was replaced by Vishal Bhardwaj by December 2017, due to creative differences. In 2018, the film was postponed due to Irrfan and Padukone's health issues. In 2024, Kartik Aaryan was reported to play the lead role with a reworked version of the script. Soon after, Shahid Kapoor and Triptii Dimri joined the film, with the former replacing Aryan in the role of Ustara.

=== Filming ===
Principal photography commenced in January 2025. Filming concluded in August 2025.

== Music ==
The music for the film was composed by Vishal Bhardwaj, with lyrics written by Gulzar. The audio rights of the film were acquired by T-Series. The first single, titled "Hum To Tere Hi Liye The," was released on 16 January 2026. The second single titled "Aashiqon Ki Colony" was released on 27 January 2026. The third single titled "Ishq Ka Fever" was released on 2 February 2026.

== Release ==
=== Theatrical ===
O'Romeo was theatrically released on 13 February 2026, coinciding with Valentine's Day weekend. It received an "A" (Adults Only) certificate from the CBFC for graphic violence and strong language.

=== Home media ===
The post-theatrical digital streaming rights of the film were acquired by Amazon Prime Video. The film began streaming on the platform on 10 April 2026.

== Reception ==
=== Critical response ===
O'Romeo received mixed reviews from critics. On the review aggregator website Rotten Tomatoes, 46% of 13 critics' reviews are positive, with an average rating of 6.4/10.

Kashvi Raj Singh of News18 rated the film 4 stars out of 5 and wrote, "In a time of blood fatigue in films, it is easy to dismiss O’Romeo. Had it come before films like Animal and Dhurandhar, it could have been better for the film. Yes, O’Romeo has its share of gore, but it is also different, and it deserves attention. It combines both good performance and technical brilliance." Dhaval Roy of The Times Of India rated the film 3.5 stars out of 5 and wrote, "Despite frequent pacing issues that demand patience, O' Romeo is worth watching for its performances, atmosphere, and cinematic brilliance." Saibal Chatterjee of NDTV rated the film 3.5 stars out of 5 and wrote, "O'Romeo is at once a love story, a revenge saga, and a crime drama. Every seemingly conflicting strand merges with the others without the lines separating (or linking) them being unduly overt. Rarely does a Hindi action film use the spirit of music and poetry to buttress emotional turmoil, physical strife, and excessive violence to the extent that this one does."

Lachmi Deb Roy of Firstpost rated the film 3.5 stars out of 5 and wrote, "O’ Romeo is undoubtedly a complete massy entertainer, but the script never thins down. A big shout-out to Vishal Bharadwaj for giving such a solid film with quirky dialogues, brilliant music, and engaging performances by each of the actors." Devesh Sharma of Filmfare rated the film 3.5 stars out of 5 and wrote, "In the end, the film is held together by its performances. The actors commit with such conviction that they make even the wildest flourishes feel momentarily plausible. You may roll your eyes at the excess, but you will not be bored. Like any good opera, it demands surrender. And if you give in, it rewards you with spectacle, passion, and performances that linger long after the curtain falls" [24]. A critic for Bollywood Hungama rated the film 3 stars out of 5 and wrote, "On the whole, O'ROMEO delivers several well-made moments and strong performances from the lead cast. However, the uneven writing and the ordinary soundtrack prevent it from creating the kind of impact it aims for."

Rishabh Suri of Hindustan Times rated the film 3 stars out of 5 and wrote, "Overall, O’Romeo has moments that remind you why Bhardwaj remains one of our most distinctive filmmakers, but they are scattered across a narrative that loses emotional clarity along the way. Despite Shahid’s wild energy and a few stylish flourishes, the film struggles to find its emotional core. It is watchable, even fun in parts, but rarely affecting in the way Bhardwaj’s best work is. You walk out entertained in flashes... and strangely unmoved." Tanmayi Savadi of Times Now rated the film 3 stars out of 5 and wrote, "O’ Romeo isn't a bad film nor a masterpiece. It has a lot of loose ends and unexplained connections. Due to this, it becomes difficult to join dots and feel characters and their purposes. With excellent performances and Vishal's ability to tell a fairly engaging story for 3 hours, O’ Romeo can be watched with loved ones and parents, only if violence, abuses, and bloodshed are palatable."

Shubhra Gupta The Indian Express rated the film 2.5 out of 5 stars and stated that the film is "high on style and swag, low on substance." Sana Farzeen of India Today rated 2.5/5 stars, saying, "Shahid Kapoor-Vishal Bhardwaj fail to recreate Haider, Kaminey magic." "Despite poetic frames and intense performances, the film struggles with an uneven screenplay and an underwhelming emotional payoff." Sakshi Salil Chavan of Outlook India rated it with 2.5/5 stars and wrote, "The film does not redefine the gangster saga, yet it offers sufficient spectacle and emotional voltage to warrant a theatrical viewing. The final act regains urgency and culminates in a rousing yet foreseeable crescendo. With a more disciplined edit, though, ‘O’ Romeo’ might have achieved the narrative stature its ambition seeks."

Anindita Mukhopadhyay of India TV rated 2.5/5 stars and wrote, "What begins with promise slowly loses grip, especially in the second half, where the writing weakens and the emotional impact fades. It looks beautiful, it sounds good, but it doesn’t stay with you the way it should. It’s not a bad film. It’s just not a fully satisfying one either." Abhishek Srivastava of Moneycontrol rated 2.5/5 stars and wrote, "‘O’ Romeo' is like a grand building: impressive from the outside but not what you expect inside. This is Bhardwaj's most commercial attempt, and it both succeeds and misfires. The film is worth watching mainly for Shahid Kapoor, who owns the role completely. While the story and pacing falter, the visual style, action sequences, and quirky moments keep it watchable. " Mukund Setlur of Deccan Herald rated the film 1.5 stars out of 5 and wrote, "There are some brilliant scenes, but for a cinematic nightmare of three hours, a few scenes are not worth the time. Some songs are likely to become chartbusters but mar the pace of the film! It looks like Bhardwaj was at crossroads while making directorial choices—to tell a story to appeal to the masses and, in that process, have failed to play to his strengths."

Anuj Kumar of The Hindu noted, "Shahid Kapoor soars, Vishal Bhardwaj struggles in this meandering romantic action drama." Rahul Desai of The Hollywood Reporter India wrote that the film "fails to make a dent in the Bombay gangster epic landscape."

=== Box office ===
The film collected ₹12.00 crore on opening day.
