= Maa Behen =

2026 Indian film by Suresh Triveni

- Official poster
- Directed by: Suresh Triveni
- Written by: Pooja Tolani
- Story by: Suresh Triveni; Pooja Tolani
- Produced by: Vikram Malhotra; Suresh Triveni
- Starring: Madhuri Dixit; Triptii Dimri; Dharna Durga; Ravi Kishan; Paresh Rawal
- Cinematography: Anuj Rakesh Dhawan
- Edited by: Dipika Kalra
- Music by: Songs: Akashdeep Sengupta; Score: Subhajit Mukherjee
- Production companies: Abundantia Entertainment; Opening Image Films
- Distributed by: Netflix
- Release date: 4 June 2026
- Running time: 127 minutes
- Country: India
- Language: Hindi

Maa Behen (transl. Mother Sister) is a 2026 Indian Hindi-language black comedy thriller film directed by Suresh Triveni. The film is produced by Vikram Malhotra and Suresh Triveni under the banners Abundantia Entertainment and Opening Image Films, respectively. It stars Madhuri Dixit, Triptii Dimri, Dharna Durga, and Ravi Kishan.

The film was released digitally on Netflix on 4 June 2026.

== Plot ==
In Adarsh Colony, Rekha is an outspoken, beautiful widow, but notorious in the neighborhood for reasons that may have more to do with the male residents’ imaginations than reality. She lives alone, having raised two daughters; Jaya, now married in Patna to the entitled Manas, and Sushma, a social-media influencer living with Jaya after a viral kissing-video scandal forced Rekha to pretend to disown her.

One night, Rekha’s neighbor Charitra Kumar Gupta, the colony’s pious, self-appointed moral guardian discovers that Rekha has embezzled funds from the wine shop where she works, which he helps manage. When he threatens to report her, she invites him over on the pretext of playing cards to plead for time. Gupta misreads the invitation, barges in and attempts to assault her. In the ensuing struggle, she pushes him away; he crashes into furniture, hits his head on a grinding stone and is knocked unconscious. Believing him to be dead, a panicked Rekha calls both of her daughters home at two in the morning.

Rekha proposes to dump the body in the nearby canal, but while dragging it, the women discover Gupta is still alive. Fearing he will report her embezzlement if he wakes, Rekha decides to keep him tied up and sedated with cough syrup for two days long enough to quietly replace the stolen money and eliminate his leverage.

What should have been a simple waiting game spirals out of control. Gupta’s wife comes looking for her missing husband amidst their daughter Goldie's wedding celebrations. Manas arrives unannounced from Patna, suspicious of Jaya’s sudden disappearance. Sushma’s long-absent biological father, who is revealed to be a conman who poses as an army officer, reappears demanding money, while a ransom demand arrives by phone; five-and-a-half lakh rupees for Gupta’s “kidnapped” safe return, addressed to his family. Each woman suspects the others of making the call, and years of simmering resentment, Jaya’s shame over Rekha’s scandalous reputation, Sushma’s feeling of being the unwanted second daughter, Rekha’s loneliness and desperation; boil over in a vicious three-way confrontation.

Jaya, emboldened by the chaos, finally stands up to Manas, revealing that she had to marry him just to preserve her image. She declares that she knows about his infertility, and has been counting every persecution she was subjected to, after which she throws him out. She further reprimands him for misbehaving with Sushma and demands a divorce on her own terms.

Gupta eventually regains consciousness and stumbles home. Rather than let the matter drop, he tries to blackmail the women, threatening to file a criminal complaint unless Rekha surrenders her house to him. He returns to Rekha’s home, demands she massage and serve him, and attempts to humiliate all three women.

The trio decide to fight back; they drug Gupta, photograph him in a compromising state, and threaten to post the images on social media. His own wife discovers him half-dressed in Rekha’s bedroom, destroying his credibility. When he still threatens an FIR, Rekha publicly re-enacts the night’s events, framing everything as self-defense against his attempted assault, daring him to expose his own predatory behavior to the colony.

Months later, Rekha, Jaya and Sushma, are watching television, when they discover that the ransom caller was Goldie, who had secretly saved the same amount over years to flee her arranged marriage and audition for a singing reality show. Having seen her father enter Rekha’s house that night, she seized the opportunity to replenish her drained savings. The film ends with Goldie performing on national television under her real name, Hema, while Rekha, Jaya and Sushma walk away from the colony’s judgment; bruised, but united.

== Cast ==
- Madhuri Dixit as Rekha Sinha, Jaya's and Sushma's mother
- Triptii Dimri as Jaya, Sushma's elder sister
- Dharna Durga as Sushma, Jaya's younger sister
- Ravi Kishan as Charitra Gupta
- Geetanjali Kulkarni as Gupta Aunty
- Arunoday Singh as Maheshwari
- Shardul Bhardwaj as Manas, Jaya's husband and Sushma's brother-in-law
- Shrivardhan Trivedi as the Khalbali host, who also serves as narrator
- Rrama Sharma as Hema Gupta a.k.a. Goldie
- Jatin Sarna as Sukumar Sinha, Rekha's husband
- Paresh Rawal as Chandan Trivedi, Sushma's biological father

== Soundtrack ==
Maa Behen

Soundtrack album by Shubham Shirule and Akashdeep Sengupta
- Released: 27 May 2026
- Genre: Feature film soundtrack
- Length: 14:50
- Language: Hindi
- Label: T-Series
External audio
- Official Audio Jukebox on YouTube

Track listing
No.	Title	Lyrics	Music	Singer(s)	Length
1.	"Kaari Kaari"	Shubham Shirule	Akashdeep Sengupta	Neelkamal Singh	3:20
2.	"Yeh Kaisi Raat"	Shubham Shirule	Akashdeep Sengupta	Shreya Jain	3:25
3.	"Dhak Dhak Reloaded"	Sameer	Anand–Milind, Akshay & IP	Anuradha Paudwal, Udit Narayan	2:28
4.	"Khol Pinjara"	Shubham Shirule	Akashdeep Sengupta	Pooja Tiwari, Akashdeep Sengupta	3:42
5.	"Kaari Kaari Rap"	Shubham Shirule, Shia	Akashdeep Sengupta	Akashdeep Sengupta, Shia	1:55
Total length:					14:50

== Marketing and release ==
Maa Behen was announced at the "Next on Netflix" event in Mumbai on 3 February 2026, where its teaser was unveiled. On 15 May 2026, coinciding with Madhuri Dixit's birthday, the release date of 4 June 2026 was announced along with a glimpse of the film. The official trailer was released on 22 May 2026.

== Reception ==
On the review aggregator website Rotten Tomatoes, 77% of 13 critics' reviews are positive, with an average rating of 6.3/10.

Rishabh Suri of Hindustan Times rated it 3/5 stars and said that "The film succeeds as a warm, character-driven story elevated by strong performances and an engaging trio of women at its heart." Renuka Vyavahare of The Times of India gave 3.5 stars out of 5 and said that "An entertaining crime-comedy that never turns into a pity party, Maa Behen has no interest in reforming society's self-appointed moral guardians. Instead, it offers women a far simpler solution: why care?" Kusumika Das writing for NDTV gave 3 stars out of 5 and said that "the film may not be flawless, Maa Behen finds its voice in the way it takes on patriarchy - calling it out as "behuda baat" and refusing to play by its rules." Ekta Sinha of Elle India described the film as "What begins as a chaotic small-town comedy slowly unfolds into a biting satire on misogyny, gossip culture, and society's obsession with policing women's lives." Anuj Kumar of The Hindu observed that "While mounting a meaningful social critique and a broad, crowd-pleasing comedy, director Suresh Triveni ultimately compromises on both. Maa Behen gradually becomes a physical representation of societal surveillance."

Nandini Ramnath of Scroll.in writes in her review that "The feminist imperative to clean up Rekha’s image paradoxically makes Maa Behen less outrageous than it seems. The last person to need a character certificate, Rekha is nevertheless handed one. This doesn’t make her less fascinating, but it does take the edge off her personality." Rahul Desai of The Hollywood Reporter India describe that "It is a colourful risk that pays off". Lachmi Deb Roy of Firstpost wrote that the dark comedy "breaks every mold of motherhood". Shubhra Gupta of The Indian Express gave 1.5 stars out of 5 and writes that "A cheeky title that wants to subvert that familiar invective, a kernel of an idea that could have turned into a feminist film and a great cast including Madhuri Dixit and Tripti Dimri can't rescue Maa Behen."
