= Avinash Tiwary =

Indian actor (Born: 1985)

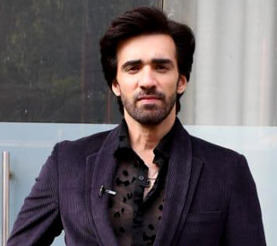
- Tiwary in 2023
- Born: 15 August 1985 (age 41); Gopalganj, Bihar, India
- Education: New York Film Academy
- Occupation: Actor
- Years active: 2009–present

Avinash Tiwary (born 15 August 1985) is an Indian actor who works in Hindi films and series. He had his first major roles in the television series Yudh (2014) and in the film Tu Hai Mera Sunday (2016). He gained recognition for starring in the romance Laila Majnu (2018) and the supernatural film Bulbbul (2020). Tiwary has received praise for starring in the crime series Khakee: The Bihar Chapter (2022), Bambai Meri Jaan (2023), and Kaala (2023), the comedy film Madgaon Express (2024), and the heist thriller Sikandar Ka Muqaddar (2024).

== Early life ==
Tiwary was born on 15 August in Gopalganj, Bihar. His family relocated to Mumbai a few years after his birth. Tiwary completed school at The D.P.Y.A. High School and studied engineering in Mumbai. In order to pursue acting, he quit engineering studies in the fourth semester and joined theatre. He joined the Barry John Acting Studio and later went to the New York Film Academy. He started appearing in short films in 2005.

== Career ==
=== Early work and breakthrough (2009–2021) ===
In theater, he worked with Om Katare, an established artist. After his stint at the New York Film Academy, he started his career with the documentary, Anamika: Her Glorious Past, in 2006. In 2009, he worked in the film, Suno Na.. Ek Nanhi Aawaz, marking his Hindi film debut alongside Tara Sharma. In 2014, Tiwary worked alongside Amitabh Bachchan and Aahana Kumra in the TV series Yudh, where he played an antagonist, Advocate Ajatshatru. Avinash had his first major role in the 2016 Milind Dhaimade's directorial debut, Tu Hai Mera Sunday, which revolves around the lives of five friends. He played Rashid opposite Rasika Dugal. The film had its world premiere at the 60th BFI London Film Festival and received positive critical acclaim. In his review for NDTV, Raja Sen found Tiwary to be "wiry and likeable".

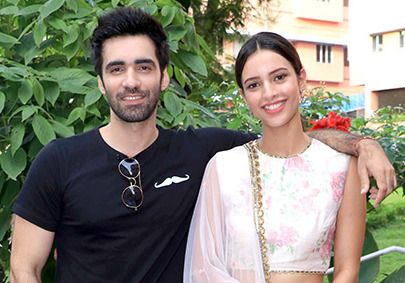
Tiwary and his co-star Triptii Dimri in 2018

In 2017, Avinash signed Imtiaz Ali's romantic movie, Laila Majnu, after auditioning for it in December 2015. The film tells the classic story of Laila and Majnu, set in contemporary times, he played Majnu opposite Triptii Dimri's Laila. Tiwary underwent major physical transformation for the role and received critical acclaim for the film. Devesh Sharma from Filmfare noted, "Avinash shares sparkling chemistry with Triptii, and has acted like a force of nature in the film. You can only see Majnu near the end and not the actor." He later signed a three-film deal with Balaji Motion Pictures in 2019.

In 2020, Tiwary starred in two Netflix horror films. He first played Dhruv in Ghost Stories opposite Mrunal Thakur. The film received negative reviews from critics. Tiwary then played Satya, a wealthy law graduate in Bulbbul, alongside Triptii Dimri. Stutee Ghosh of The Quint stated that Tiwary added a "credible potency" to his character. Tiwary played a married doctor engaged in an affair opposite Parineeti Chopra and Aditi Rao Hydari, in the 2021 mystery thriller The Girl on the Train. Bollywood Hungama found him to be "dependable".

=== Career progression (2022–present) ===
In 2022, Tiwary's career saw a turning point with his web debut in the Neeraj Pandey's series Khakee: The Bihar Chapter. Based on true event, he played Chandan, a lower-caste truck driver, part of the Ashok Mahto gang. Rahul Desai of Film Companion stated, "Avinash Tiwary does a good job as the dacoit-styled baddie, but his character is hampered by a script that puts effect over any real reading of human nature." In the same year, he played a married man Inder, opposite Mrunal Thakur in the short film Jahaan. Times of India's Archika Khurana praised Tiwary and Thakur's chemistry.

Tiwary appeared in two crime thriller series in 2023. He first appeared in Excel Entertainment's Bambai Meri Jaan, alongside Kay Kay Menon. He played Dara Kadri, a character based on Dawood Ibrahim. Anuj Kumar of The Hindu opined, "Avinash's journey is more internal and at times his brooding intensity becomes a little too much but overall he provides a competent counterpoint to Kay Kay". In Kaala he played Ritwik, an IB officer. Deepa Gahlot was critical of his "half-baked" character. Both these series proved crucial for Tiwary and earned him recognition.

In 2024, Tiwary played Ayush, one of the three friends stuck in Goa, in Kunal Khemu's directorial debut, the comedy film Madgaon Express. Mayur Sanap from Rediff.com noted, "Avinash Tiwary takes a little while to warm up to his role, but when he finally gets there, it works really well". Pratikshya Mishra of The Quint opined, "Avinash flips the idea of the 'hunk' in Bollywood by playing Ayush with a charm that makes him even more attractive". Later that year, he played the title role in Neeraj Pandey's crime drama film Sikandar Ka Muqaddar, which released on Netflix.

== In the media ==
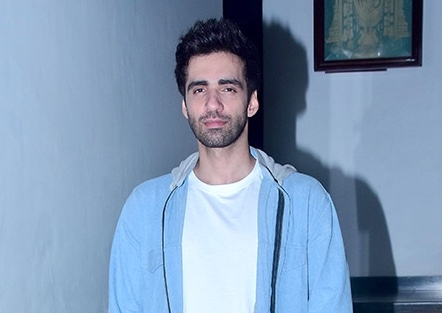
Tiwary in 2018

Harsh B.H. from Film Companion said that since his debut Tiwary has teetered between "recognition and invisibility". Vrutika Shah of Hello! India stated, "It’s characteristic of talented performers like Tiwary to be known for their extremely convincing portrayal of any role they slip into." Prateek Sur of Outlook India said, "Tiwary is one such actor who has not only caught the attention of audiences but has also left an indelible mark in the film industry." His performance in Laila Majnu, is regarded as one of the "100 Greatest Performances of the Decade" by Film Companion. In 2020, he was placed 49th in Times Most Desirable Men list.

== Filmography ==
Key
†	Denotes films that have not yet been released

=== Films ===
Year	Title	Role	Notes	Ref.
2009	Suno Na.. Ek Nanhi Aawaz	Hari Mohan Basu		
2017	Tu Hai Mera Sunday	Rashid		
2018	Laila Majnu	Qais / Majnu		
2020	Ghost Stories	Dhruv	Karan Johar's segment	
2020	Bulbbul	Satya		
2021	The Girl on the Train	Dr. Shekhar Kapoor		
2022	Jahaan	Inder	Short film	
2024	Madgaon Express	Ayush Gupta		
2024	Sikandar Ka Muqaddar	Sikandar Sharma		
2025	The Mehta Boys	Amay Mehta		
2026	O'Romeo	Jalal		
2026	Ginny Wedss Sunny 2	Shivansh "Sunny" Chaturvedi		

=== Television ===
Year	Title	Role	Ref.
2009	Bikhri Aas Nikhri Preet	Dinesh	
2010	Rishta.com	Atul	
2010	Ek Aangan Ke Ho Gaye Do	Unknown	
2014	Yudh	Advocate Ajatshatru	
2022	Khakee: The Bihar Chapter	Chandan "Pintu" Mahto	
2023	Bambai Meri Jaan	Dara Kadri	
2023	Kaala	Ritwik Mukherjee	
TBA	O Saathi Re †	TBA	

=== Dubbing ===
Year	Title	Actor	Character	Notes	Ref.
2022	Ponniyin Selvan: I	Jayam Ravi	Arulmozhi Varman ("Ponniyin Selvan")	Hindi dub	
2023	Ponniyin Selvan: II	Jayam Ravi	Arulmozhi Varman ("Ponniyin Selvan")	Hindi dub	

== Awards and nominations ==
Year	Award	Category	Work	Result	Ref.
2023	Iconic Gold Awards	Best Actor in a Negative Role	Khakee: The Bihar Chapter	Won	
2023	Bollywood Hungama Style Icons	Most Stylish Breakthrough Talent (Male)	Khakee: The Bihar Chapter	Nominated	
2023	Filmfare OTT Awards	Best Supporting Actor - Drama Series	Khakee: The Bihar Chapter	Nominated	
2024	Iconic Gold Awards	Best Actor - Web	Bambai Meri Jaan	Won	
2024	Filmfare OTT Awards	Best Actor in a Series (Male): Drama	Bambai Meri Jaan	Nominated	
2025	Iconic Gold Awards	Best Actor Critics - OTT	Sikandar Ka Muqaddar	Won	
