= Triptii Dimri =

Indian actress (born 1994)

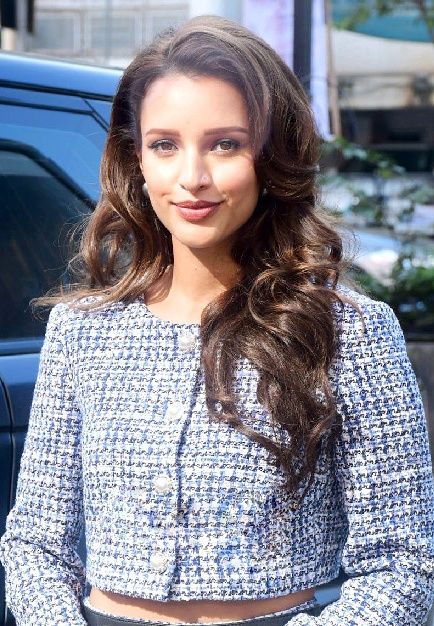
- Dimri in 2024
- Born: 23 February 1994 (age 32); New Delhi, India
- Education: University of Delhi
- Occupation: Actress
- Years active: 2017–present

Triptii Dimri (pronounced [trɪptiː dɪmriː]; born 23 February 1994) is an Indian actress who primarily works in Hindi films. Her accolades include a Filmfare OTT Award. Dimri has been featured in Forbes India's 30 Under 30 list of 2021.

Dimri had her first lead role in the romantic drama Laila Majnu (2018), but gained critical recognition for her performances in Anvita Dutt's dramas Bulbbul (2020) and Qala (2022), with the former earning her a Filmfare OTT Award. She gained wider popularity with a supporting role in the top-grossing action film Animal (2023), for which she was nominated for the Filmfare Award for Best Supporting Actress. She has since starred in the comedy films Bad Newz and Bhool Bhulaiyaa 3 (both 2024).

== Early life ==
Triptii Dimri was born in New Delhi on 23 February 1994 into a Garhwali family to Meenakshi and Dinesh Dimri. Her family is from Chamoli, Uttarakhand. Dimri graduated from Delhi Public School in Firozabad, Uttar Pradesh. She went on to study psychology at Sri Aurobindo College of the University of Delhi.

== Career ==
=== Early work and critical recognition (2017–2022) ===
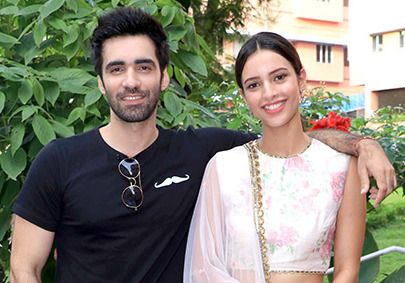
Dimri with co-star Avinash Tiwary promoting Laila Majnu in 2018

After a role as an extra in Mom (2017), Dimri had her first lead role in Shreyas Talpade's directorial debut, the comedy Poster Boys, starring Sunny Deol, Bobby Deol and Talpade in lead roles. An official remake of the Marathi film Poshter Boyz, it featured her as Talpade's love interest. A critic for Bollywood Hungama opined that Dimri had been overshadowed by others in the ensemble cast. The following year, she starred in the romantic drama Laila Majnu (2018) opposite Avinash Tiwary. In her review for Firstpost, Anna M. M. Vetticad noted that she "imbued her Laila with an edge that made the character's constant flirtations with danger believable". Following its release digitally, many outlets assigned the film cult status despite its initial commercial failure. Dimri later professed to struggling with the film's failure at the box-office as she believed it would improve her career prospects.

Following a short hiatus, Dimri achieved her breakthrough as the protagonist in Anvita Dutt's 2020 supernatural drama Bulbbul, reuniting with Tiwari for a second time. Produced by Anushka Sharma for Netflix, the film was met with positive reviews from critics. Namrata Joshi of The Hindu wrote, "From the vulnerable and the innocent to the transformation into the mysterious tease, Dimri is a stunner who speaks volumes with her eyes. And the audience can do little but stay enraptured". Her performance earned her a Filmfare OTT Award for Best Actress in a Web Original Film. In 2022, Dimri reunited with Dutt to star in the title role of her critically acclaimed drama Qala. Dimri said that she her role in Qala allowed her to diversify her filmography and challenge herself by exploring genres she had not previously worked in. Her performance as an aspiring playback singer struggling to maintain her position in the music industry received praise. Sanatanu Das of the Hindustan Times found Dimri to be "in fine form" but added that "her character is frustratingly one-note and delivered mostly in the same anxious wavelength".

=== Commercial breakthrough (2023–present) ===
Dimri appeared in a brief role in the top-grossing action drama Animal (2023), starring Ranbir Kapoor. Monika Rawal Kukreja of Hindustan Times was appreciative of Dimri's short appearance in the film. The film proved to be a significant advancement in Dimri's career with her role gaining her wider recognition. She received a nomination for the Filmfare Award for Best Supporting Actress. She credited the success of Animal with providing her access to a wider variety of roles.

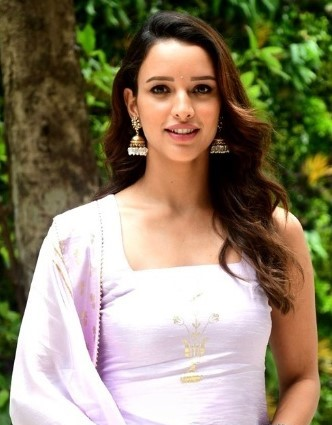
Dimri in 2024

In the following year, Dimri had three releases. She starred alongside Vicky Kaushal and Ammy Virk in Bad Newz, a comedy about heteropaternal superfecundation. Having grown accustomed to working in more dramatic pieces, Dimri admitted to finding the comedy genre challenging. NDTV's Saibal Chatterjee found her lacking in her portrayal of a "befuddled character". Rahul Desai of Film Companion particularly lamented the diminished depth of Dimri's character, and considered it a downgrade from her roles of depth in Bulbbul and Qala. In Vicky Vidya Ka Woh Wala Video, Dimri and Rajkummar Rao played newlyweds in 1997 searching for their missing sex tape. Dimri faced criticism and social media trolling for her dancing abilities in a song from the film titled "Mere Mehboob"; she acknowledged it as a learning experience while trying something new. The Quint's Pratikshya Mishra was appreciative of Rao and Dimri's abilities and chemistry in a poorly written film, but Bhavna Agarwal of India Today noted her comic timing to be persistently poor in both Bad Newz and Vicky Vidya Ka Woh Wala Video. It underperformed commercially.

The following month, Dimri starred alongside Kartik Aaryan, Vidya Balan and Madhuri Dixit in the comedy horror sequel Bhool Bhulaiyaa 3. Reviewers for The Hindu and Rediff.com dismissed the actress' role in the film as purely ornamental. Bad Newz and Bhool Bhulaiyaa 3 rank among the highest-grossing Hindi films of 2024, with the latter earning ₹4.17 billion (US$45 million) worldwide. Saibal Chatterjee observed that Dimri "faces a very real risk of over-exposure" due to the number of films she has appeared in consecutively. In 2025, Dimri starred opposite Siddhant Chaturvedi in the spiritual sequel Dhadak 2, a remake of the Tamil film Pariyerum Perumal (2018). She played Vidhi, a girl that becomes romantically involved with a boy from a lower caste at her college. Critics commended her performance for breaking away from the typecasting she faced following her role in Animal. Despite its positive critical reception, Dhadak 2 failed at the box-office.

The following year, Dimri starred opposite Shahid Kapoor in Vishal Bhardwaj's romantic action film O'Romeo (2026), an adaptation of Sapna Didi's segment of the novel Mafia Queens of Mumbai by Hussain Zaidi. In a mixed review of the film, Saibal Chatterjee commended Dimri's abilities as the femme fatale and found her performance as a woman seeking vengeance for her husband's murder to be "strikingly convincing". It emerged as a commercial failure. She next featured with Madhuri Dixit in the black comedy film Maa Behen for Netflix. Rediff.com's Sukanya Verma commended Dimri as the standout in a role that was "finally worthy of her talent". She will next star opposite Prabhas in Sandeep Reddy Vanga's Spirit.

== In the media ==
Dimri was featured by Forbes Asia in their 30 Under 30 list of 2021. She ranked 8th in Rediff.com's list of Bollywood Best Actresses of 2020. She ranked 20th in The Times of India's 50 Most Desirable Women List of 2020. In 2026, Time magazine named her to its TIME100 Next India list, recognising her as one of India's emerging influential figures.

== Filmography ==
Key
†	Denotes films that have not yet been released

=== Films ===
Year	Title	Role	Notes	Ref.
2017	Mom	Swati	Uncredited	
2017	Poster Boys	Riya		
2018	Laila Majnu	Laila		
2020	Bulbbul	Bulbbul Chaudhary	Netflix film	
2022	Qala	Qala Manjushree	Netflix film	
2023	Animal	Zoya Riaz		
2024	Bad Newz	Saloni Bagga		
2024	Vicky Vidya Ka Woh Wala Video	Vidya Babla		
2024	Bhool Bhulaiyaa 3	Rajkumari Meera / Rajkumari Madhulika Devi (Note: Dimri played dual roles in the film.)		
2025	Dhadak 2	Vidhi Bharadwaj		
2026	O'Romeo	Afsha Qureshi / Rani Sharma (Note: Dimri played a single character with two or more names.)		
2026	Maa Behen	Jaya Srivastava	Netflix film	
2027	Spirit †	TBA	Telugu film; filming	

== Awards and nominations ==
Year	Award	Category	Work	Result	Ref
2020	Filmfare OTT Awards	Best Actress in a Web Original Film	Bulbbul	Won	
2023	Bollywood Hungama Style Icons	Most Stylish Breakthrough Talent (Female)	—N/a	Nominated	
2023	Bollywood Hungama Style Icons	Most Stylish Haute Stepper	—N/a	Nominated	
2023	Filmfare OTT Awards	Best Actress in a Web Original Film	Qala	Nominated	
2024	Filmfare Awards	Best Supporting Actress	Animal	Nominated	
2024	IIFA	Best Supporting Actress	Animal	Nominated	
2024	Bollywood Hungama Style Icons	Most Stylish Ground-Breaking Star of the Year	—N/a	Won	
2024	Bollywood Hungama Style Icons	Most Stylish Power-Packed Performer of the Year (Female)	—N/a	Nominated	
2024	Bollywood Hungama Style Icons	Most Stylish Leading Entertainer of the Year (Female)	—N/a	Nominated	
2026	Zee Cine Award	Best Actor – Female	Dhadak 2	Nominated	
