= Bulbbul =

2020 Indian film by Anvita Dutt

- Official poster
- Directed by: Anvita Dutt
- Written by: Anvita Dutt
- Produced by: Anushka Sharma; Karnesh Ssharma
- Starring: Tripti Dimri; Avinash Tiwary; Paoli Dam; Rahul Bose; Parambrata Chatterjee
- Cinematography: Siddharth Diwan
- Edited by: Rameshwar S. Bhagat
- Music by: Amit Trivedi
- Production company: Clean Slate Filmz
- Distributed by: Netflix
- Release date: 24 June 2020
- Running time: 94 minutes
- Country: India
- Language: Hindi

Bulbbul is a 2020 Indian Hindi-language period horror film written and directed by Anvita Dutt. It was produced by Anushka Sharma and Karnesh Ssharma under Clean Slate Filmz and starred Tripti Dimri in the lead role alongside Avinash Tiwary, Paoli Dam, Rahul Bose, and Parambrata Chattopadhyay. Set against the backdrop of the 1880s Bengal presidency, the film revolves around a child bride and her journey from innocence to strength. Bulbbul was released on Netflix on 24 June 2020.

== Plot ==
During the 19th century in a village of Bengal Presidency, Bulbbul is married off to Indranil, a wealthy lord, when she is barely five years old. She is close with Satya, Indranil's youngest brother, who is closer to her age. Bulbbul and Satya grow up together, telling each other stories of a witch ("chudail").

Twenty years later, as Bulbbul and Satya have grown up, Satya returns home from London after spending 5 years over there. In the interim, Indranil's mentally-challenged twin brother Mahendra was killed in what is believed to be a chudail's attack. His widow Binodini now lives in an outhouse. Indranil has left the village and Bulbbul has taken over his responsibilities. The village doctor, Sudip, regularly visits to check Bulbbul's feet due to an incident she refuses to discuss. When another man is killed, Satya suspects Sudip. Meanwhile, Bulbbul is informed by a village boy that his mother has committed suicide after her husband chose his second wife over her; Bulbbul seeks out the man.

In flashbacks, it is revealed that Binodini had been jealous of Indranil and Bulbbul and hinted to him that Bulbbul had feelings for Satya. With his mind poisoned, Indranil sent Satya to London to separate the two. Bulbbul and Satya had been collaborating on a story together, but heartbroken, she burned the manuscript in the fireplace. Influenced by Binodini, Indranil attempted to retrieve the burned pages and managed to recover only the title page. Seeing their names together, he became convinced of Bulbbul's feelings for Satya. Enraged, he beat her and mutilated her feet with iron bars. While she is bedridden, Mahendra rapes her, accidentally suffocating her while caught up in his sadism.

Following this, there is a supernatural change in Bulbbul — she's surprisingly transformed from a soft and well spoken girl to a powerful and strong woman. She returns with a mission to help the women in her village fight back against injustice. She goes through a symbolic transformation each time, represented by a blood-red moon which indicates that the goddess Kali is supporting her. She punishes men who abuse, murder, or take advantage of girls by killing them; she is in fact the chudail the villagers attribute the killings to, distinguished by backward feet. Bulbbul also killed Mahendra.

In the present day, Satya is escorting Sudip to Calcutta. The driver of the carriage (the village boy's father Bulbbul had been seeking) is killed by the chudail, making Satya realise that Sudip is innocent. Satya shoots the woman but is confronted by Sudip. During a brawl with Sudip, Satya accidentally sets the forest on fire and also discovers that Bulbbul is the chudail. Upon realizing this, he cries in agony, while Bulbbul takes refuge on a tree and is slowly engulfed by the flames.

A year later, Indranil returns to his empty estate without any knowledge of what had happened. Satya has departed, guilt-ridden for what happened to Bulbbul and feeling like he too was becoming like his brothers. That night, Indranil is awoken by Bulbbul, who smirks at him, hinting that she will kill him as revenge.

== Cast ==
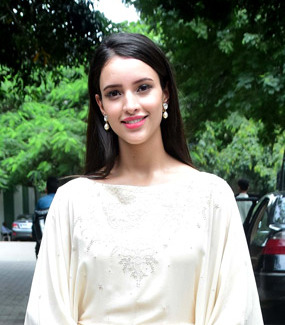
Tripti Dimri played the titular role Bulbbul

- Tripti Dimri as Bulbbul Chaudhary, a former child bride who secretly fights against the injustices females face in her village.
  - Ruchi Mahajan as child Bulbul
- Avinash Tiwary as Satyajeet Thakur, Indranil's younger brother and Bulbbul's childhood friend.
  - Varun Buddhadev as child Satya
- Paoli Dam as Binodini Chaudhary, Mahendra's wife, Indranil's lover.
- Rahul Bose in dual roles as twins:
  - Thakur Indranil Chaudhary: Bulbul's husband, Mahendra and Satya's brother, Binodini's lover.
  - Mahendra Chaudhary: Binodini's mentally challenged husband, Indranil and Satya's brother.
- Parambrata Chattopadhyay as Dr. Sudip; a local doctor who regularly checks up on Bulbbul's mutilated feet.

== Production ==
The story of the movie was written by Anvita Dutt who has been a commissioned writer for films. She wrote the first two pages of the story after waking from her sleep one night and outlined the chudail, the myth, and the idea behind her in this first draft. She completed the rest of the story after returning from a trip from Kolkata, after seeing a bulbul make a nest outside her house and after some encouragement from her colleagues. She intended the story to resemble a fairy tale and set it in the neoclassical era of Bengal to fulfill that. She was also inspired by Rabindranath Tagore's portrayal of women; Binodini is the name of one of the characters in his work. The premise has similarities with Tagore's novella Nastanirh, which was adapted by Satyajit Ray as the 1964 film Charulata. Dutt describes, "Now in reality what happens to women is much worse. The emotional, the physical and the psychological abuse is much, much worse. In telling of the story, I chose to tell it this way. I wanted the cold rage of women to find an outlet... It's a tragedy. The story is set 200 years ago but it's still relevant."

The film was shot over a period of thirty-three days in the Bawali Rajbari built by the Bawali Raj, and other locations near Kolkata and Mumbai. Siddharth Diwan led the cinematography. With inputs from Dutt, the artwork of Raja Ravi Varma and Caravaggio were used as inspiration, in addition to influences from Expressionism and Surrealism. Diwan also took inspiration from photographers like Man Ray and Raja Deen Dayal. Satyajit Ray's poster of the film Devi was an inspiration for the lighting. Some examples of symbolism used include the grass, kaash phool, the bird and flower motifs, all significant to the goddess Durga. The mansion used in the film is Bawali Rajbari, located 30 km (19 mi) from Kolkata in the village of Nodakhali. The mansion has previously featured in the film Chokher Bali by Rituparno Ghosh.

== Themes ==
Set in the late 19th century in Bengal, the film delves into the idea of aristocratic Bengali women embracing ideologies of freedom. Aruna Chakravarti's Jorasanko described Tagore's relationship with his sister-in-law, the child-bride Kadambari, which Shreya Paul of Firstpost noted as the foundation behind the relationship between Bulbbul and Satya. Chakravarti described how Kadambari was devastated when she was separated from Tagore (due to his marriage). Further, Tagore's older brother, Birendranath, suffered from a mental illness but was still married off and abused his wife, similar to Binodini being married off to Mahender.

Aditya Mani Jha of Firstpost noted that the film is "a postmodern example of the Gothic genre", the most common example of which is Bram Stoker's Dracula. Satya is similar to Jonathan Harker, the protagonist of Dracula, in that they have the same "cold, unemotional logic" that leads them to investigate the case (much like Sherlock Holmes) and eventually decide to kill the monster themselves. The supernatural element (chudail in this case) embodying repressed emotions or desires is a trope of the Gothic genre. Bulbbul's disclosure as the chudail frames her like a goddess, specifically like Kali. Binodini subtly planting the idea of Bulbbul and Satya in Indranil's head makes her similar to Iago.

== Reception ==
On the review aggregator website Rotten Tomatoes, 88% of 17 critics' reviews are positive, with an average rating of 6.3/10.

Shubhra Gupta of The Indian Express stated: "Bulbbul is very much its own film, the mix of classic pre-Renaissance Bengal and desi horror gothic making for gripping viewing... It is a powerfully feminist, revisionist tale of a woman wronged, and it is told with economy, precision and feeling...Dutt uses the ancient trope of a bloodthirsty 'chudail with ultey pair', a familiar creature tale in our scary 'kisse-kahaani', to create dread and fear. The writing is skillful and stays on point, and the performances are all solid." Namrata Joshi of The Hindu applauded the rebellious idea of Dutt and stated: "Anvita Dutt mixes the feudal with the supernatural, the spooky, the mythological and the fablesque in a thoughtful, moving and engaging manner." Stutee Ghosh of The Quint gave it 3 stars and mentioned that "One of the questions that the film throws up and doesn't answer is if the binary between being a devi or a chudail is the only recourse that feminine power has to navigate in this patriarchal setup."

Rohan Naahar of Hindustan Times reviewed the film as over-directed but underwritten. He wrote that the characters are thinly written, the surprises are carelessly telegraphed, and a weak script lets down the film in spite of visually striking imagery. Baradwaj Rangan of Film Companion South wrote "What we’re left with is a fever-dreamscape quasi-giallo movie, which transforms the pulp premise of a female vigilante...into something very human and emotional and deeply mysterious...the film’s imagery may be teasingly ambiguous, but the "hell hath no fury" messaging couldn't be clearer".

Director Anurag Kashyap tweeted and called the film one of the best he had seen in this millennium and also praised the performance by the lead actors and Anvita Dutt.

=== Accolades ===
Year	Award	Category	Recipient(s)	Result	Ref.
2020	Filmfare OTT Awards	Best Film (Web Originals)	Anushka Sharma and Karnesh Sharma	Nominated	
2020	Filmfare OTT Awards	Best Actress in a Web Original Film	Tripti Dimri	Won	
2020	Filmfare OTT Awards	Best Supporting Actor in a Web Original Film	Rahul Bose	Won	
