= National Film Award for Best Stunt Choreography =

Indian film award

- National award for contributions to Indian Cinema
- Sponsored by: National Film Development Corporation of India
- Rewards: Rajat Kamal (Silver Lotus); ₹2,00,000
- First award: 2016
- Most recent winner: Anal Arasu, Maharaja (2023)

The National Film Award for Best Stunt Choreography is one of the National Film Awards presented annually by the National Film Development Corporation of India. It is one of several awards presented for feature films and awarded with Rajat Kamal (Silver Lotus).

The award was instituted in 2016, at 64th National Film Awards and awarded annually for films produced in the year across the country, in all Indian languages.

== Winners ==
Award includes 'Rajat Kamal' (Silver Lotus) and cash prize. Following are the award winners over the years:

List of award recipients, showing the year (award ceremony), film(s), language(s) and citation
Year	Recipient	Film(s)	Language(s)	Refs.
2016 (64th)	Peter Hein	Pulimurugan	Malayalam	
2017 (65th)	King Solomon	Baahubali 2: The Conclusion	Telugu	
2018 (66th)	Anbariv	KGF: Chapter 1	Kannada	
2018 (66th)	Vikram Mor	KGF: Chapter 1	Kannada	
2019 (67th)	Vikram Mor	Avane Srimannarayana	Kannada	
2020 (68th)	Rajasekhar	Ayyappanum Koshiyum	Malayalam	
2020 (68th)	Mafia Sasi	Ayyappanum Koshiyum	Malayalam	
2020 (68th)	Supreme Sundar	Ayyappanum Koshiyum	Malayalam	
2021 (69th)	King Solomon	RRR	Telugu	
2022 (70th)	Anbariv	KGF: Chapter 2	Kannada	
2023 (71st)	Pruthvi Uppari	Hanu-Man	Telugu	
2023 (71st)	Kannan Nanduraj	Hanu-Man	Telugu	
2024 (72nd)	Anal Arasu	Maharaja	Tamil	
