= Suno Na.. Ek Nanhi Aawaz =

- Directed by: Amy Thanawala
- Written by: Amy Thanawala; Sanjay Chandwara; Rahul Patel
- Produced by: Amy Thanawala
- Starring: Tara Sharma
- Cinematography: Dhananjay Kulkarni
- Edited by: Dayal Mojidra; Naren Ratan
- Music by: Sanjoy Chowdhury
- Production company: Cinema Kollage
- Release date: 15 May 2009
- Country: India
- Language: Hindi

Suno Na.. Ek Nanhi Aawaz is a 2009 Indian Hindi-language drama film co-written, produced, and directed by Amy Thanawala and starring Tara Sharma.

== Cast ==
- Tara Sharma as Anupama
- Dharmendra Gohil as Dhruv
- Rinku Patel as Raina
- Avinash Tiwary
- Makrand Shukla as Deepak

== Production ==
The film marks the directorial debut of Amy Thanawala, who previously worked as an assistant director for Khamoshi: The Musical and Sarfarosh. Tara Sharma played the role of a pregnant woman while being pregnant.

== Soundtrack ==
All lyrics are written by Yogesh and Roop-Mati; all music is composed by Sanjoy Chowdhury.

Track listing
No.	Title	Singer(s)	Length
1.	"Meri Amma Suno Mera Kehna"	Antara Chowdhury, Apurva	5:43
2.	"Girls Rock The World"	Rekha Rao	4:33
3.	"Deewana Ab Dil Na Maane"	Shaan	6:29
4.	"Pal Aaya Suhana"	Kunal Ganjawala, Richa Sharma	3:32
5.	"Zindagi Uljhano Se Bhari"	Antara Chowdhury	5:22
6.	"Ja Bairi Ja Badra"	Shubha Rege	5:27
Total length:			31:06

== Reception ==
A critic from The Indian Express wrote, "This debutant feature has very little going for it". A critic from the Bangalore Mirror wrote, "Take a deep breath and hold it in for two hours. Suno na.. will knock you dead anyway".
