= Prakash Kapadia =

Indian screenwriter

- Occupations: Screenwriter & dialogue writer
- Writing career
- Period: 2002 — present

Prakash Kapadia is an Indian screenwriter and dialogue writer, known for his work in Hindi cinema. He is particularly recognised for collaborating with filmmaker Sanjay Leela Bhansali on several critically acclaimed films, including Devdas (2002), Black (2005), Saawariya (2007), Guzaarish (2010), Bajirao Mastani (2015), and Padmaavat (2018).

== Career ==
Kapadia began his career as a writer in the early 2000s, gaining prominence with the screenplay and dialogues for Devdas (2002), directed by Sanjay Leela Bhansali. The film was a major critical and commercial success, and Kapadia's dialogues in particular received wide appreciation for their poetic quality.

He continued his collaboration with Bhansali on Black (2005), a film inspired by the life and struggles of Helen Keller.

In Saawariya (2007), an adaptation of Fyodor Dostoevsky's short story White Nights, Kapadia contributed the screenplay and dialogues.

Kapadia also wrote for Guzaarish (2010), a film dealing with themes of euthanasia, in which his dialogues were described as philosophical and poignant.

His later works include Bajirao Mastani (2015), and Padmaavat (2018). Both films were among the highest-grossing Indian films of their time.

== Awards and recognition ==
- Filmfare Award for Best Dialogue – Gangubai Kathiawadi (2023)
- IIFA Award for Best Dialogue – Devdas (2003)
- Screen Award for Best Dialogue – Devdas (2003)
- Filmfare Award for Best Screenplay – Black (2006)
- Multiple nominations for Bajirao Mastani (2015) and Padmaavat (2018)
