= Anuradha Sharma Pujari =

Indian writer

- Born: 1964 (age 61–62); Jorhat, Assam, India
- Occupations: Author, Journalist, Poet
- Writing career
- Period: 1997–present.
- Genre: Assamese literature
- Notable works: The Heart's a Showbiz, In Search of a God, Kanchan (book)|Kanchan, Autograph (autobiography)|Autograph, Yat Ekhon Aranya Asi (novel)
- Notable awards: Sahitya Akademi Award (2021)

Signature
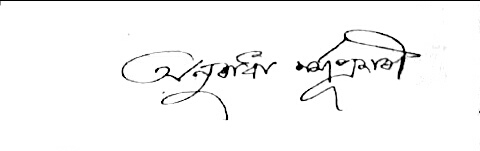

Anuradha Sharma Pujari (born 1964) is an Assamese journalist and author. She is the editor of Sadin and Satsori. Her contributions to Assamese literature include fiction and essays. She lives in Panjabari, Guwahati. Her first novel is Hriday Ek Bigyapan.

== Early life ==
Born in Jorhat, she studied sociology at the Dibrugarh University, and journalism at the Birla Institute of Liberal Arts and Management Sciences, Kolkata. She gained popularity with her column in Letters from Kolkata in Asom Bani weekly and fame with her novel The Heart's a Showbiz. First published in 1998, it was hailed by Homen Borgohain as a contemporary classic. His review said it raised some basic questions about modern Assamese life that no other writer had raised before. The novel went on to printings of 14 editions.

== Professional career ==
The author was the guest of honour at National bravery award presentation hosted by the Indian Council for Child Welfare, Assam, in collaboration with Ladies' and Children's Recreation Centre and the Kamrup District Council for Child Welfare at Hem Sishu Sadan in Guwahati. Anuradha Sharma Pujari's Hridoi Ek Bigyapan was, along with Amritjyoti Mahanta's first novel Adhagara Mahanogoror Probashi, one of only two novels in Assamese "that deals with the glamorous world of media and communication in all its complexities".

Anuradha Sarma Pujari (born 1964) has been called "one of the most popular writers of this generation", and her work described as traversing "the varied textures of human conflict" and covering the tension between the society and the individual including explorations of femininity and "the gaps that exist between people in a relationship".

== Bibliography ==
Novels

- Hridoy Ek Bigyapon (The Heart's a Showbiz), 1998.
- Ejon Eshworor Sondhanot (In Search of a God), 1998.
- Kanchan (novel), 2001. The novel depicts the life of a girl named kanchan who is incessantly cheated and sexually harassed by some narrow minded men folk.
- Sahebpurar Borosun (Rains of Sahebpura), 2003. This novel brings to light an adventurous journey of social workers specially in a village named sahebpura.
- Boragee Nodir Ghat (The Banks of Boragee River), 2004.
- Nahoror Niribili Cha (Shadows of Nahor), 2005. This can be termed as the diary of the writer while she was reading in Dibrugarh university. The characters she met and all the events that occurred on these two years are clearly mentioned in the book.
- Raag-Anurag,ৰাগ অনুৰাগ 2007.
- Mereng, 2010. The story of a strong woman named mereng or Indira Miri.
- Son Harinor Chekur( Race of the golden deer),2012. This book is dedicated to the youths who are very serious and tensed about their career and often commit suicide when they failed. Life is a very interesting journey. It is too precious to be idled away. The book gives the message that the youths should dedicate themselves to what they like. Live every moment. Don't die before your death.
- Nil Prajapati (Blue Butterflies), 2013. This book is full with many small problems and love between couples.
- Jalachabi, (2014). This book depicts how the problem of Alzheimer creates gap between old parents and their children.

Short story collections

- Boxontor Gaan (Spring-song), 1999.
- Ejon Oxamajik Kobir Biography (An Unsocial Poet's Biography), 2001
- Catherinor Soite Eti Nirjon Duporia (An Afternoon with Catherine), 2005
- No Man's Land

Autobiographical non-fiction

- Kolikotar Cithi (Letters from Calcutta), 1999.
- Diary, 2001.
- Autograph, 2004.
- American Charaikhanat Sanbad Basanta aru Bandhu(essays)
- Alop Chinta Alop Gadya (Editorials Collection)
- Priya Manuh : Priya Katha, 2013

== Awards ==
- She won the Sahitya Akademi Award 2021 for her novel ' ইয়াত এখন অৰণ্য আছিল'.
