= Mafia Queens of Mumbai =

2011 non-fiction crime novel

- First edition
- Author: Hussain Zaidi; Jane Borges
- Language: English
- Publisher: Tranquebar
- Publication date: 15 April 2011
- Publication place: India fiction Crime
- Media type: Print (paperback, hardback)
- Pages: 290

The Mafia Queens of Mumbai: Stories of women from the ganglands is an Indian 2011 non-fiction crime novel written by Hussain Zaidi with original research by reporter Jane Borges. It tells 13 true stories of women who were involved in criminal activities in Mumbai. Rajkummar Rao, Radhika Apte and Kalki Koechlin provided their voice for its audio book for audible.

== Reception ==
Matt Daniels of Mint wrote, "These are a handful of women who lived fearlessly, and Mafia Queens celebrates their spirit. But the real heroes are Zaidi and Borges, who ventured undaunted into the dark corners of the city to illuminate them." Zara Murao of Hindustan Times reviewed: "It’s hard to tell how much of Mafia Queens is apocryphal, given that each of the 13 stories is pieced together from official documents, case reports and anecdotes from the subject’s family and acquaintances. The account, though, vibrates with drama, intrigue and unexpected pathos."

J. Srinivasan of The Hindu Business Line noted that it was "really fascinating to read how these women slip into different roles so effortlessly and efficiently." Alpana Chowdhury of Daily News and Analysis mentioned, "From the choice of the women they have portrayed, to the racy style of writing, everything is calculated to make the book a page-turner." Kankana Basu of The Hindu felt, "Mafia Queens, by virtue of its very stark simplicity is a revelation, a rare treat for the discerning lover of crime stories."

== Adaptations ==
Director Sanjay Leela Bhansali made a film titled Gangubai Kathiawadi (2022), based on the chapter of Gangubai Kothewali from the book. Alia Bhatt portrayed the titular character of Gangubhai Kothewali

Director Vishal Bhardwaj, who has also written the foreword of the book, adapted a chapter based on Sapna Didi to a film and titled it O'Romeo. The film, starring Shahid Kapoor and Triptii Dimri, was released on 13 February 2026 to mixed reviews from the critics.
