= King Solomon (stunt coordinator) =

Indian stunt director and action choreographer

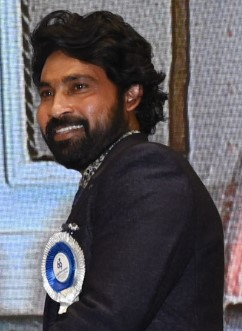
- Solomon in 2023
- Born: Chirala, Andhra Pradesh, India
- Other name: Solomon Raju
- Occupation: Stunt director, Action choreographer, stunt performer
- Years active: 2011–present

King Solomon, also known as Solomon Raju, is an Indian stunt coordinator, action choreographer and stunt performer who primarily works in Telugu films. He is best known for his action sequences in the films such as Eega (2012), Baahubali duology (2015–2017), RRR (2022) and Kalki 2898 AD (2024). He has won two National Film Awards.

== Early life and career ==
Solomon was born in Chirala, India in a Telugu Christian family. He moved to Hyderabad to pursue a career in the film industry. Initially, he worked in several Telugu films as stunt performer and later as assistant, before having a breakthrough with Rajanna (2011). He has choreographed the action sequences in the climax scenes of the film. Later, he debuted as the lead stunt coordinator in S. S. Rajamouli's Eega (2012). Since then he worked as the stunt coordinator and action director in every film of S. S. Rajamouli.

== Filmography ==
Year	Title	Language	Notes
2011	Rajanna	Telugu	
2012	Eega	Telugu	Debut as lead stunt coordinator
2015	Asura	Telugu	
2015	Baahubali: The Beginning	Telugu	
2015	Rudhramadevi	Telugu	
2015	Columbus	Telugu	
2017	Nenorakam	Telugu	
2017	Baahubali 2: The Conclusion	Telugu	
2017	Yuddham Sharanam	Telugu	
2019	Kurukshetra	Kannada	
2021	Crime Factory	Hindi	
2022	RRR	Telugu	
2023	Shaakuntalam	Telugu	
2024	Kalki 2898 AD	Telugu	
2024	Devara: Part 1	Telugu	
2026	The RajaSaab	Telugu	
2027	Varanasi †	Telugu	

== Awards and nominations ==
Award	Year	Category	Work	Result	Ref.
National Film Awards	2018	Best Stunt Choreography	Baahubali 2: The Conclusion (Note: along with Lee Wittaker and Kaecha Kampakdee)	Won	
National Film Awards	2023	Best Stunt Choreography	RRR	Won	
Vulture Stunt Awards	2023	Best Stunt in an Action Film	RRR (The Bridge Scene)	Nominated	
Vulture Stunt Awards	2023	Best Fight	RRR (Ram's Intro)	Nominated	
Vulture Stunt Awards	2023	Best Shootout	RRR (The Piggyback Dual Wielding)	Nominated	
Vulture Stunt Awards	2023	Best Practical Explosion	RRR (The Bridge Scene Tanker Explosion)	Nominated	
Vulture Stunt Awards	2023	Best Achievement in Stunts Overall	RRR	Nominated	
