= Gangubai Kathiawadi =

2022 Indian film by Sanjay Leela Bhansali

- Theatrical release poster
- Directed by: Sanjay Leela Bhansali
- Screenplay by: Sanjay Leela Bhansali; Prakash Kapadia; Utkarshini Vashishtha
- Story by: S. Hussain Zaidi
- Based on: Mafia Queens of Mumbai by S. Hussain Zaidi
- Produced by: Jayantilal Gada; Sanjay Leela Bhansali
- Starring: Alia Bhatt; Shantanu Maheshwari; Vijay Raaz; Indira Tiwari; Seema Pahwa; Jim Sarbh; Ajay Devgn
- Cinematography: Sudeep Chatterjee
- Edited by: Sanjay Leela Bhansali
- Music by: Songs: Sanjay Leela Bhansali; Score: Sanchit Balhara and Ankit Balhara
- Production companies: Pen Studios; Bhansali Productions
- Distributed by: Pen Marudhar Entertainment
- Release dates: 16 February 2022 (Berlinale); 25 February 2022 (India)
- Running time: 154 minutes
- Country: India
- Language: Hindi
- Budget: ₹100 crore
- Box office: est. ₹209.77 crore

Gangubai Kathiawadi is a 2022 Indian Hindi-language biographical crime drama film directed by Sanjay Leela Bhansali and produced by Bhansali and Jayantilal Gada. Based on the book Mafia Queens of Mumbai by S. Hussain Zaidi, it tells the story of Gangubai Kathiawadi, a simple girl from Kathiawad who is forced into prostitution and later rises to become a madam and an influential figure in Bombay's red-light area. The film stars Alia Bhatt in the title role, alongside Shantanu Maheshwari, Vijay Raaz, Indira Tiwari, Seema Pahwa, Jim Sarbh and Ajay Devgn.

Gangubai Kathiawadi premiered at the 72nd Berlin International Film Festival on 16 February 2022, and was released in theatres on 25 February 2022. It received widespread critical acclaim for its themes, direction, production value and Bhatt's performance. The film grossed ₹153.69 crore (US$16 million) at the domestic box office and ₹209.77 crore (US$22 million) globally, emerging as a commercial success. Numerous publications listed Gangubai Kathiawadi and Bhatt's performance in the film on various year-end best films and performances lists of 2022.

The film has received various accolades. At the 69th National Film Awards, Gangubai Kathiawadi won 5 awards, including Best Actress (Bhatt) and Best Screenplay (Bhansali and Vashishtha). At the 68th Filmfare Awards, the film received a leading 17 nominations and won a leading 11 awards, including Best Film, Best Director (Bhansali), and Best Actress (Bhatt).

== Plot ==
In 1944 Kathiawad, 16-year-old Ganga Jagjivandas Kathiawadi aspires to become a Bollywood actress. Her lover, Ramnik, tricks her with promises of a film career and lures her to Bombay, where he sells her for ₹1,000 to a brothel in Kamathipura run by an abusive pimp, Sheela. Forced into prostitution, Ganga renames herself Gangubai and learns to survive in the brothel.

After being brutally assaulted by a violent client named Shaukat Khan, Gangubai seeks justice from his boss Rahim Lala, the local underworld don. Impressed by her courage, Lala adopts her as his sworn sister, brutally punishes Shaukat, and extends his protection to her and the women of Kamathipura.

Following Sheela's death, Gangubai runs for election as the President of Kamathipura against Raziabai, a formidable transgender opponent. Following a brief romance with a Bihari Muslim tailor Afsaan, she heavy-heartedly arranges for his marriage with Roshni, the daughter of a fellow prostitute, to protect her from being forced into sex work. Winning the election, she transforms the local brothel culture, fighting to secure basic rights, dignity, and education for sex workers and their children.

Following a grand Navaratri celebration, Rahim informs Gangubai about a local school that initiated a campaign to evict the prostitutes from Kamathipura, citing negative influence on the students. Gangubai protests the campaign and confronts the school's principal, arguing that educating the children of Kamathipura is the only way to abolish sex trade and usher in a positive change for their future. She forces him into admitting the children, paying their fees for five years.

However, the children are forcibly evicted from the school on the first day. Outraged, Gangubai seeks assistance of a sympathetic journalist, Hamid Faizi, and delivers a powerful speech at a rally in Azad Maidan, advocating for equal human rights. Her speech leads to a personal meeting with Prime Minister Jawaharlal Nehru, who is moved by her plea and promises to protect Kamathipura from real estate developers attempting to evict the women.

Returning home victorious, she receives a grand welcome and secures her status as the matriarch of Kamathipura.

== Cast ==
- Alia Bhatt as Gangubai Kathiawadi, a female mafia don and a brothel madame in Kamathipura who seeks to better the lives of her fellow sex workers (character loosely based on Gangubai Kothewali)
- Ajay Devgn as Rahim Lala, a mafia don of South Bombay of Afghan origins and Gangubai's sworn brother (character loosely based on Karim Lala)
- Shantanu Maheshwari as Afsaan Badr-ur-Razzaq, a tailor from Calcutta who came to Bombay for learning the trade from his uncle.
- Vijay Raaz as Raziabai, a hijra sex-worker of Kamathipura, more concerned with holding power as president of the district than helping her constituents
- Indira Tiwari as Kamli, a prostitute who became Gangu's best friend and worked in the same brothel
- Seema Pahwa as Sheela, the madame who purchased Gangu
- Varun Kapoor as Ramnik Lal, a pimp who pretended to be in love with Gangu and then proceeded to sell her into prostitution.
- Jim Sarbh as Hamid Faizi, a journalist working for the Bombay Urdu Times
- Rahul Vohra as Prime Minister (character based on Jawaharlal Nehru)
- Huma Qureshi as Dilruba
- Sonal Madhushankar as Banno, a prostitute from Kamathipura
- Anmol Kajani as Birju, Gangubai's butler
- Prashant Kumar as Badri, Sheela's (& later Gangubai's) henchman
- Raza Murad as the builder's agent
- Chhaya Kadam as Rashmibai, a fellow madame of Kamathipura
- Mitalee Jagtap as Kusum, a prostitute who became Gangu and Kamli's friend and worked in the same brothel as them.
- Pallavi Jadhav as Rama, a prostitute of Kamathipura
- Kruti Saxena as Nimmi, a prostitute from Kamathipura
- Lata Singh as Lata, a prostitute from Kamathipura
- Ekta Shri as Ekta, a prostitute from Kamathipura
- Abhirami Bose as Abhirami, a prostitute from Kamathipura
- Chum Darang as Chum, a prostitute from Kamathipura
- Baldev Trehan as Afsaar's uncle
- Jahangir Khan as Shaukat Abbas Khan, a sadistic client who hurts Gangu
- Faiz Khan as Liaquat, Rahim Lala's henchman
- Rakesh Bhavsar as Jugnu, a man who tried to molest Gangu when she led a group of her fellow prostitutes to watch cinema in a nearby theatre while observing a day off from work.
- Roshan Chatterjee as Pinku, Raziabai's henchman

== Production ==
=== Development ===
The news about an adaptation of one of the chapters of Hussain Zaidi's book Mafia Queens of Mumbai first came out in June 2017 with Priyanka Chopra attached to star as the leading character. The film's earlier title was Heera Mandi. In March 2019, Chopra confirmed that she was working on a project with Bhansali, who also confirmed that he was making Gangubai Kathiawadi with Chopra. However, in September 2019, media reported that Alia Bhatt, who was supposed to do a different film, titled Inshallah, by Bhansali was going to replace Chopra after Inshallah got shelved. Principal photography begun in Film City, Mumbai on 27 December 2019.

=== Casting ===
The film marks the Hindi cinema debut of television personality Shantanu Maheshwari, who portrays Gangubai's boyfriend Afsaan. and TV actor Varun Kapoor to debut as the grey role of Ramnik Lala.

=== Filming ===
Filming began On 8 December 2019 Production was put on hold in March 2020 due to the lockdown ordered by the Indian government owing to the COVID-19 pandemic, when the film was 70% complete. Bhatt resumed work on 6 October 2020, and Ajay Devgn who is playing a cameo joined sets on 27 February 2021. The film was wrapped up on 26 June 2021.

== Soundtrack ==
The film score is composed by brothers Sanchit Balhara and Ankit Balhara, while the songs featured in the film are composed by Sanjay Leela Bhansali with lyrics written by A. M. Turaz, Kumaar and Bhojak Ashok "Anjam". The Hindi version of the chorus singer includes Tarannum Jain, Dipti Rege, Aditi Pradhudesai, Aditi Paul, Kalpana, Ruchna, Pragti. The Telugu version of the chours singer includes Sahithi Komanduri, P. Sathya Yamini, Harini Ivaturi, Aswhini Chepuri, V. Pavani.

== Release ==
=== Theatrical ===
Gangubai Kathiawadi had its premiere on 16 February 2022 at 72nd Berlin International Film Festival, at the Berlinale Speciale Gala Section. The film was released in cinemas on 25 February 2022. Earlier, the film was scheduled for release on 30 July 2021 but it was postponed due to the rising cases and second wave of the COVID-19 pandemic. It was then scheduled for worldwide release in theatres on 6 January 2022 to avoid clashing with S. S. Rajamouli's RRR, which would also get postponed due to the Omicron variant of COVID-19, the release has been changed to 18 February 2022. Later, the date was pushed back by a week to release on 25 February 2022.

The film was released in its original Hindi language along with a dubbed version in the Telugu language.

=== Home media ===
The film was released on Netflix on 26 April 2022. In June 2022, the film became the most-watched Indian film on Netflix.

== Reception ==
=== Box office ===
Gangubai Kathiawadi earned ₹10.50 crore (US$1.1 million) at the domestic box office on its opening day. On the second day, the film collected ₹13.32 crore (US$1.4 million). On the third day, the film collected ₹15.30 crore (US$1.6 million), taking total domestic weekend collection to ₹39.12 crore (US$4.1 million).

As of 14 April 2022, the film grossed ₹153.69 crore (US$16 million) in India and ₹55.56 crore (US$5.8 million) overseas, for a worldwide gross collection of ₹209.25 crore (US$22 million), recovering its budget and emerging as a commercial success. The film grossed over ₹209.77 crore (US$22 million) worldwide, becoming the fifth highest grossing Hindi films of 2022. Bollywood Hungama and Box Office India stated that the film's box-office verdict of a "hit".

=== Critical response ===
Gangubai Kathiawadi received critical acclaim with major praise directed towards the performances (particularly Bhatt, Raaz, Maheshwari, Devgn and Pahwa), music, production design, cinematography, storyline and Bhansali's direction. On the review aggregator website Rotten Tomatoes, the film holds an approval rating of 91% based on 22 reviews and an average rating of 7/10.

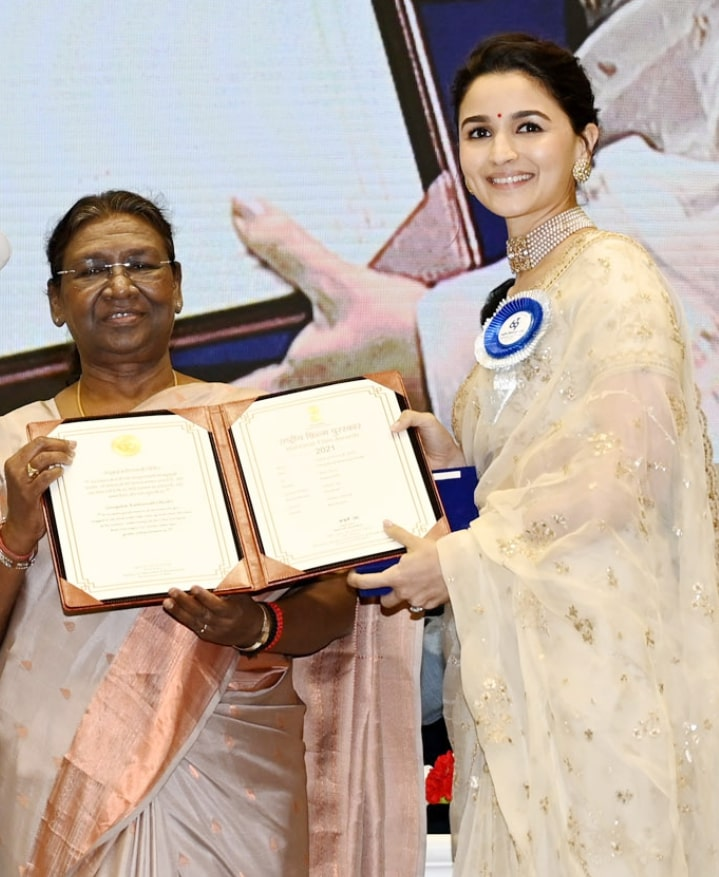
Bhatt's performance as the titular character garnered acclaim, winning her several awards, including the National Film Award for Best Actress

Sushri Sahu of Mashable gave the film a rating of four and a half out of five stars and wrote "Sanjay Leela Bhansali's Gangubai Kathiawadi starring Alia Bhatt, Ajay Devgn and others is an absolute crowd-puller. Mugdha Kapoor Safaya of DNA India gave the film a rating of four out of five stars and wrote "The film's narrative is such that you will empathise with Gangu, root for her and cheer for her with every small victory but never pity her."

Jagadish Angadi of Deccan Herald gave the film a rating of four out of five stars and wrote "Alia Bhatt as Gangubai is exceptionally brilliant. The linear storytelling effectively highlights multiple conflicts of Gangubai. Wendy Ide of The Observer gave the film a rating of four out of five stars and wrote "The hard-hitting story of a sex worker who rises through the ranks of 60s gangland Mumbai is powered by a magnetic performance from Alia Bhatt".

Ronak Kotecha of The Times of India gave a rating of three and a half out of five stars and wrote "With whatever is packed into this drama, there are enough moments that will draw you into this world where nights seem endless and the lights never fade." Saibal Chatterjee of NDTV gave the film a rating of three and a half out of five stars and wrote "The visually sumptuous character study, more baroque than 1950s Bombay, is at once sweeping and intimate". Tushar Joshi of India Today gave a rating of three and a half out of five stars and wrote "Gangubai Kathiawadi's camera work, background score and dialogues are the three pillars that take it from being just another gutsy biopic to a film that creates a massive impact. Gangubai is a solid risk for both Bhansali and Alia. A risk that pays off beautifully for both the director and his muse".

Prathap Nair of Firstpost gave a rating of three and a half out of five stars and wrote "Written by Bhansali and Utkarshini Vashishtha, it flips the narrative by handing out extraordinary concessions to the female lead at its heart, not entirely a frequent occurrence in Bollywood". Bollywood Hungama gave the film a rating of three and a half out of five stars, writing: "The Alia Bhatt-starrer Gangubai Kathiawadi is a powerful saga and is embellished with terrific moments and a career best performance by Alia Bhatt. At the box office, it has bright chances to score with the multiplex and female audiences". Stutee Ghosh of The Quint gave the film a rating of three and a half out of five stars and wrote "Gangubai Kathiawadi is a Sanjay Leela Bhansali canvas and a complete Alia Bhatt show".

Sukanya Verma of Rediff gave the film a rating of three and a half out of five stars and wrote "Something in Alia has surely changed after Gangubai. Her entire performance is about proving to herself and not to the world what she can do, feels Sukanya Verma". Sanjana Jadhav of Pinkvilla gave the film a rating of three and a half out of five stars and wrote "Alia Bhatt and the cast performances, Bhansali's visuals and a sneak peek into this brutal world makes it a definite watch".

Devesh Sharma of Filmfare gave the film a rating of three and a half out of five stars and wrote "SLB has again given us a film which keeps us glued to our seats for close to three hours". Shubhra Gupta of The Indian Express gave the film a rating of three out of five stars, writing, "Sanjay Leela Bhansali's latest is the kind of old-fashioned dialogue-heavy, sentiment-on-sleeve film which Bollywood is forgetting how to make".

Monika Rawal Kukreja of Hindustan Times wrote "Alia Bhatt...has given a superlative performance as Gangubai". Anuj Kumar of The Hindu wrote "This is easily Bhansali at his best as he has been able to marry craft with content; here, he attempts a Pakeezah for the millennials and almost succeeds". Sonia Dedhia of News18 wrote "Alia Bhatt practically disappears into the character of Gangubai Kathiawadi. There's a hard-to-miss intensity in her eyes, and tenacity in her voice".

=== Year-end lists ===
The Guardian featured Alia Bhatt's portrayal in their listing of the best big-screen performances of all time. Wendy Ide of Screen Daily named Bhatt's performance in the film as the best performance of the year 2022. Mark Kermode of The Guardian listed Bhatt's performance in the film as one of the ten best performances of 2022. Subhash K. Jha of Times of India listed Bhatt's performance in the film among the top five acclaimed female performances of 2022. Sukanya Verma of Rediff listed Bhatt as one of the top female performers of 2022.

Sanyukta Thakare of Mashable listed Bhatt as one of the top female performers of the year. Santanu Das of Hindustan Times listed Bhatt's performance in the film as one of the best Indian film performances of 2022. Sakshi of News24 listed Bhatt's performance in the film as one of the best Indian film performances of 2022.

Ananya Jain of Indiatimes listed Bhatt's performance in the film as one of the best Indian film performances of 2022. Man's World staff listed Bhatt's performance in the film as one of the best Bollywood female performances of 2022.

Subhash K. Jha of Firstpost crowned Gangubai Kathiawadi as the best Hindi film of 2022. Anupama Chopra of Film Companion ranked it as the third best Indian film of 2022. Shubhra Gupta of The Indian Express listed it as one of the best films of 2022.

Deepa Gahlot of Rediff listed it as one of her top movies of 2022. Aparita Bhandari of Paste listed it as one of the ten best Bollywood movies of 2022. Times of India listed it as one of the best Bollywood films of 2022. The Financial Express listed it as one of the highly acclaimed content-driven films of 2022. Corinne Sullivan and Jasmine Ting of Cosmopolitan listed it as one of the twenty best Bollywood movies of 2022. Allan Hunter of Screen Daily listed it as one of the ten best films of 2022. Siddhant Adlakha of Vulture listed it as one of the five best Indian films of 2022. Shomini Sen of WION listed it as one of the best Hindi films of 2022. Anuj Kumar of The Hindu listed it as one of the best Hindi films of 2022.

Nidhi Gupta of Vogue India listed it as one of the best Bollywood movies of 2022. Scroll staff listed it as one of 2022's best and most memorable releases in cinemas and on streaming platforms across different languages. Meenakshi Shedde of Mid-Day listed it as one of the top twenty best all-India films of 2022.

== Impact ==
Gangubai Kathiawadi is credited as one of the films which has revived the movie business post COVID-19 pandemic. It is considered as an ice-breaker for Bollywood since it was one of the few Hindi films to pull audiences back to the cinema halls after the pandemic. Bollywood Hungama noted that Gangubai Kathiawadi's commercial performance has given the much-needed hope to the industry that the box-office in the near future would fire up even more. They also noted Bhatt's ability to shoulder a film on her own and stated, ‘‘Actresses often are not able to do so and need the help of a male actor to get audiences to cinemas. Alia, on the other hand, stands out and she doesn't need any hero's support. Without a male actor, she has managed to deliver a film that's all set to enter the ₹100 crore club and that speaks volumes’’.

Additionally, Bollywood Hungama further noted that, there's a belief that the cinema-going audience primarily consists of males. As a result, testosterone-driven films aimed at men would have a high chance of succeeding and fairer sex can't make a film a hit. However, Gangubai Kathiawadi's box office performance proves that even women audiences can take the film into the 'hit' or even the 'super-hit' zone. Bhatt's look in Gangubai Kathiawadi inspired Malaysia's Northern Haute Couture Fashion Show 2022. Deadline Hollywood noted that Gangubai Kathiawadi proved to be a ‘‘rare-breakout’’ for a female-led Bollywood feature. Actress Bhumi Pednekar credited Gangubai Kathiawadi for encouraging her to do female-lead films. Cultural professor Rachel Dwyer referred Gangubai Kathiawadi as Bhansali's version of 1972 cult classic, Pakeezah. She drew parallels between Bhatt's and Meena Kumari's character and wrote, "Gangubai may be seen as a version of Sahibjaan/ Pakeezah, who finds herself in the great modern city of Bombay/Mumbai rather than in the courtly world of the then Hindustan, just as Meena Kumari was a heroine of the post-Independence cinema, the way Alia Bhatt is of today’s post-Bollywood". Outlook magazine called Gangubai Kathiawadi a modern-day classic and credited it for setting the stage for a shift in audience's taste.

=== Historical accuracy ===
In the film, Alia Bhatt portrays the historical figure of ‘Gangubai Kothewali’ who was a sex worker, brothel madam, and local social activist for sex worker rights in Kamanthipura, Mumbai, during the 1950s and 60s. Zaidi's book ‘Mafia Queens of Mumbai’ describes her as coming from a wealthy, well-educated family in Kathiawar, Gujrat, and as a teenager she idolised Hindi cinema and dreamed of becoming an actress. At the age of 16, she eloped to Mumbai with her suitor, Ramnik Lal, married him, and then was deceived and sold to a Kamanthipura brothel for about INR 500 (US$5.6), where she was forced into sex work. Later accounts of her life talk about how she developed a strong relationship with the underworld don, Karim Lala, and even cemented that friendship by tying him a rakhi, after which he gave her political control over the area. Sources credit her with returning trafficked girls like ‘Madhu’ in the movie to their homes, lobbying and fighting against the displacement of brothels under ‘moral clean-up’ campaigns linked to nearby schools, and delivering the widely reported speech as shown in the movie, at ‘Azad Maidan’ (a large historical public ground in South Mumbai), that later led to an appointment with Jawaharlal Nehru (Prime Minister) to discuss sex workers’ rights.

The film reproduces several concrete incidents which are present in Zaidi's book, and subsequent journalistic retellings of her life. The film's opening stretch highlights her affluent background, eloping to Mumbai, dreaming of a film career, and being sold to the brothel in Kamanthipura. The scene where a gangster brutally assaults and rapes her, she goes to Karim Lala and shows her injuries, and then Karim Lala murders the gangster, parallels the story of how she and Karim Lala built that strong relationship. Even the visual details like the trademark white sari with a broad border and a large red bindi are consistent with her photographs and descriptions of her public persona.

At the same time, the film does take some creative liberty and uses drama and storytelling rather than a strictly accurate, end-to-end historical reconstruction of her life. Major films in the movie like the political rival Raziabai, the brief love episode with Afsaan, the journalist Hamid, and several friends and family members (like Kamli and her child Pammi) are significant drivers of the film plot and emotional storyline, however do not appear in Zaidi's book, which rather focuses on Madhu, Karim Lala, and institutional actors like schools and other politicians. While sources do refer to brothel-keeper elections and her being remembered and called as the ‘President of Kamathipura’, they do not describe the formalised, high-drama presidential contest depicted in the film, with campaign stunts, chanting, rallies, and a singular showdown with one rival (Raziabai), which Bhansali stages in the film.
