= Gangubai Kothewali =

Indian sex worker and social activist (died 1977)

- Born: Ganga Harjeevandas; 1907; Kathiawar, British India (present-day Gujarat, India)
- Died: 8 September 1977 (aged 69–70); Bombay, Maharashtra, India
- Other name: Gangubai Kathiawadi
- Occupations: Sex worker; madam

Gangubai Harjeevandas (1907 – 8 September 1977), (Note: The honorific suffix bai, lit. 'lady', is often added to the names of women in India. The name here itself being Gangu or Ganga.) better known as Gangubai Kothewali (Note: Kothewali literally means a prostitute. From kotha (brothel) and wali, which showcases her status as the madam of a brothel.) or Gangubai Kathiawadi, (Note: Indicating her origin from Kathiawar (Saurashtra) in western India.) was an Indian social activist, sex worker and madam of a brothel in the Kamathipura area of Mumbai during the 1960s. Gangubai worked for the rights of sex workers and for the well-being of orphans. She gradually ended up operating her own brothel and is known to also have lobbied for the rights of commercial sex workers.

== Early life ==
Gangubai was sold into prostitution at the age of 16, in 1923, by her suitor, Ramnik Lal, after running away from home to Bombay. By the age of 25, she became known as a prominent figure, Madame of Kamathipura due to her involvement in managing sex workers in the district and her reported associations with elements of the city’s criminal underworld.

Mafia Queens of Mumbai (2011) by Hussain Zaidi contains information on the lives of thirteen women who influenced Mumbai. In it, Zaidi also gives information about Gangubai. According to this, Gangubai was from a highly educated family, wanted to work in films, and was also a fan of Dev Anand. At the age of 16, Gangubai fled to Mumbai with her 26-year-old suitor Ramnik Lal, where they got married. Within a few days of the marriage, her husband sold her in a kuntankhana (brothel) for ₹1,000. Reluctantly, Gangubai started working as a prostitute. Since her original name "Ganga" is associated with the sacred Ganga River, she later began using the name "Gangu", a colloquial shortened form of her birth name.

== Career ==
In a short time, Gangubai became the head of some kuntankhanas. Zaidi and Borges (2011) describe Gangubai’s efforts to support women who were trafficked or coerced into prostitution in Kamathipura. She reportedly refused to force women into sex work and, when possible, paid to release those who had been sold against their will. It’s been noted that she advocated for sex workers to receive days off, fought against harassment in public spaces, and attempted to secure educational access for their children.

At a women’s conference at Azad Maidan, she reportedly stated that the stigma surrounding prostitution had “saved the chastity, integrity, and morality of several thousands of women” and argued that sex workers should be treated as equals. It is said that this statement reframed the narrative around sex workers by portraying them as humans who deserve respect and autonomy, and not just as victims.

Sex workers commonly experience multiple forms of violence, including physical, sexual, and economic abuse from clients, intimate partners, pimps, and police. Studies of sex workers in Kamathipura describe severely overcrowded and unsanitary living conditions, with many women and their families lacking reliable access to basic needs such as food, education, hygiene, and healthcare. Female sex workers report facing lifelong social stigma, often beginning within their own families.

In response to the degrading attitude common towards prostitutes, Gangubai also reportedly claimed at the same conference that “The only solution to the problem is by treating sex workers as equals. The day you manage to do this, I will believe that society has achieved ‘women empowerment’”

== Conflicts and connections ==
A man named Shaukat Khan Pathan, who was associated with Don Karim Lala’s gang of Pathans, started exploiting her financially and physically. Gangubai approached Karim Lala, a prominent underworld don of that era, to lodge a complaint against Pathan. Lala assured her of help, and in return, she tied a rakhi (a sacred thread symbolising brotherhood and protection) on his wrist. Following this, Lala personally warned and roughed up Shaukat Khan. As a result, Gangubai gained the protection of the underworld and earned widespread respect in Kamathipura.

Since then, Gangubai's repute as Karim Lala's supposed sister grew during the 1960s. St. Anthony's Girls' High School, which was established in Kamathipura in 1922, started a campaign to clean up the area from bad influence. This led to an order to move the brothel. Gangubai vehemently opposed this and allegedly presented her case to the then Prime Minister Jawaharlal Nehru i.e. in 1957, and as a result, the brothel was not moved.

During this time Gangubai was also working for various issues of orphans and women in the prostitution business. It has been noted that Gangubai defended the rights of the brothel's sex workers by insisting on a weekly Sunday break, during which they were not required to take clients, and by encouraging them to spend their time off in public spaces without being shamed. Gangubai also reportedly counselled and sent back many young women, who had fled their homes to work in films but were forcefully brought into prostitution. For this reason, everyone used to respectfully call her Gangubai Ganga Maa. After her death, her photographs and statues were erected in brothels of the area.

== In popular culture ==
Her life was documented in the 2011 book, Mafia Queens of Mumbai, by writer and investigative journalist Hussain Zaidi. Accounts based on this book also describe Gangubai as having interacted with several political figures of her time. One widely circulated anecdote recounts her meeting with Prime Minister Jawaharlal Nehru, although not fully verified, after a public address on the condition of red-light districts. Reports note that she used the meeting to argue for formal recognition of prostitution belts in major cities and to raise concerns about the treatment of sex workers.

The 2022 Indian Hindi-language film Gangubai Kathiawadi is based on the life of Gangubai Kothewali and a chapter of Zaidi's book, and directed by Sanjay Leela Bhansali with actress Alia Bhatt playing the titular character. The film’s portrayal of Gangubai places emphasis on elements such as glamour, status, and personal resilience. It depicts her involvement in local activism and her opposition to social constraints, but also simplifies or reframes certain elements, including her connections to the criminal world of the period. As a result, the on-screen representation presents a more cohesive version of her life than the sometimes conflicting circumstances documented in historical accounts.

In addition to these characterisations, the movie depicts Gangubai engaging in several activities connected to community welfare and local advocacy. These include organising weekly rest days for sex workers, presented as an attempt to establish more structured working conditions, and accompanying children to school to contest their exclusion from local education. She is also shown addressing disputes with community leaders over discrimination, negotiating for safer work environments, and even participating in local elections within Kamathipura. In these depictions, her character is involved in public discussions about the treatment of sex workers and their families, including calls for formal recognition and legal protections for the profession.

A 2025 scholarly article claims that the film’s imaginative interpretation of events and characterisation enlarges the legacy of Gangubai Kothewali, framing her life as a “classic tale” of a selfless community leader. The study argues that this adaptation has played a significant role in shaping how Gangubai is now popularly remembered, specifically as a figure advocating for the dignity and acceptance of sex workers.

=== Backlash ===
In 2021, a man named Babuji Shah, who claimed to be the adopted son of Gangubai, filed a lawsuit with the Bombay High Court against both the book, Mafia Queens of Mumbai, and the movie Gangubai Kathiawadi, saying that both pieces were defamatory, ruined Gangubai’s reputation, and also infringed on her privacy. After failing to show proof of his adoption, the Bombay High Court extended relief to the producers and actors for the film and the authors of the book.
