= Utkarshini Vashishtha =

Indian screenwriter

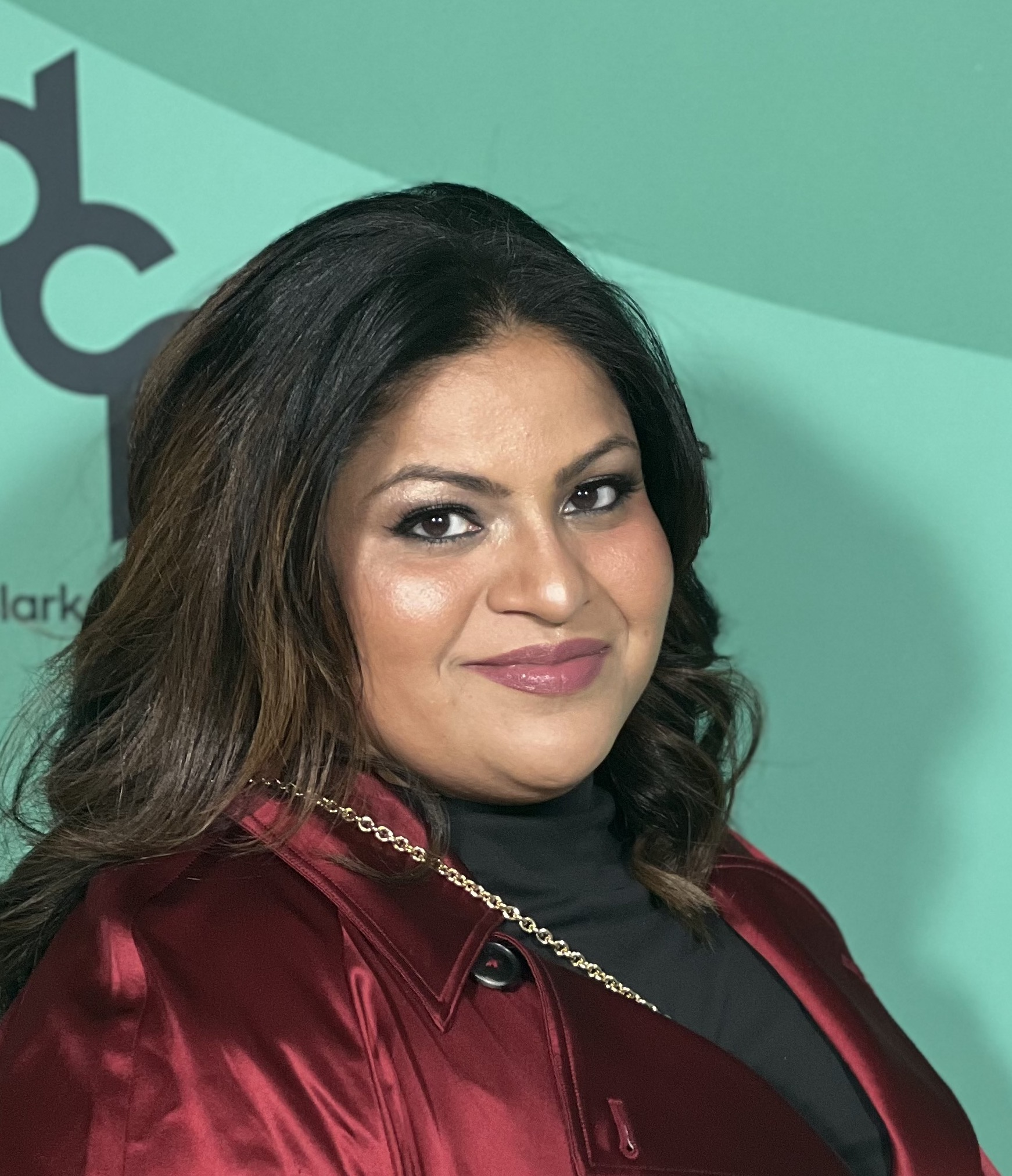
Utkarshini Vashishtha

Utkarshini Vashishtha is an Indian screenwriter who works in Hindi cinema. She is known for writing scripts for films like Gangubai Kathiawadi (2022), Sarbjit (2016), Goliyon Ki Raasleela Ram-Leela (2013). Vashishtha was also the associate and creative director for India's Got Talent.

== Career ==
Vashishtha came into limelight after Sarbjit (for which she has written the screenplay and dialogues) got screened in 2016 Cannes Film Festival and was shortlisted for the 88th Academy Awards.

== Filmography ==
Year	Film	Direction	Screenplay	Dialogue	Note	Ref.
2013	Goliyon Ki Raasleela Ram-Leela	No	No	Yes	As an associate director	
2016	Sarbjit	No	Yes	Yes		
2022	Gangubai Kathiawadi	No	Yes	Yes		

== Awards ==
Year	Award	Category	FILM
2023	National Film Awards	Best Screenplay	Gangubai Kathiawadi
2023	National Film Awards	Best Dialogue	Gangubai Kathiawadi
2023	Filmfare Awards	Best Dialogue	Gangubai Kathiawadi
2023	International Indian Film Academy Awards	Best Screenplay	Gangubai Kathiawadi
2023	International Indian Film Academy Awards	Best Dialogue	Gangubai Kathiawadi
2023	Zee Cine Awards	Best Dialogue	Gangubai Kathiawadi
