= Haq (2025 film) =

2025 Indian film by Suparn Verma

- Theatrical release poster
- Directed by: Suparn Verma
- Written by: Reshu Nath
- Based on: Bano: Bharat ki Beti by Jigna Vora
- Produced by: Vineet Jain; Vishal Gurnani; Juhi Parekh Mehta; Harman Baweja; Vicky Jain
- Starring: Yami Gautam Dhar; Emraan Hashmi; Vartika Singh; Sheeba Chaddha
- Cinematography: Pratham Mehta
- Edited by: Ninad Khanolkar
- Music by: Songs: Vishal Mishra; Score: Sandeep Chowta
- Production companies: Junglee Pictures; Insomnia Films; Baweja Studios
- Distributed by: Junglee Pictures
- Release date: 7 November 2025
- Running time: 136 minutes
- Country: India
- Language: Hindi
- Budget: est. ₹40–45 crore
- Box office: est. ₹28.68 crore

Haq (transl. Right) is a 2025 Indian Hindi-language courtroom drama film directed by Suparn Verma. It stars Yami Gautam Dhar and Emraan Hashmi, alongside Sheeba Chaddha in a pivotal role. Produced by Vineet Jain, Vishal Gurnani, Juhi Parekh Mehta, Vicky Jain and Harman Baweja under the banners Junglee Pictures, Insomnia Films and Baweja Studios respectively. It is inspired by journalist Jigna Vora’s book Bano: Bharat ki Beti which is based on the landmark Supreme Court judgement of Mohd. Ahmed Khan v. Shah Bano Begum. The film’s screenplay was written by Reshu Nath, with music composed by Vishal Mishra, cinematography by Pratham Mehta and editing by Ninad Khanolkar.

Haq was released theatrically on 7 November 2025. It received positive reviews from critics, who praised its performances and its bold social commentary but also faced pre-release legal controversy over its portrayal of the Shah Bano case. It underperformed at the box office, grossing ₹28.68 crore worldwide.

== Plot ==
In 1970s India, in Sankhani, Shazia Bano is married to lawyer Abbas Khan. Her seemingly stable life is disrupted when Abbas abruptly leaves for Murree, Pakistan on the pretext of work. Months later, he returns with a second wife, Saira. Over the years, Shazia realises that Abbas has long been in love with Saira and no longer cares for her. Devastated, Shazia returns to her hometown with her children.

Although Abbas promises to pay Shazia a monthly maintenance of ₹400, he fails to honour the commitment. Seeking justice, Shazia files a legal case against him with the help of lawyer Bela Jain. In retaliation, Abbas divorces her by invoking talaq-e-biddat (instant triple talaq). The case sparks debate over the conflict between religious personal law and constitutional rights. The court initially rules in Shazia’s favour but limits the maintenance amount to ₹22 per month.

As communal tensions rise in the 1980s, Shazia once again approaches the courts to secure adequate alimony for the sake of her children. Abbas deliberately forfeits the case to escalate it to the Supreme Court, intending to turn it into a national issue by mobilising religious groups to pressure the judiciary.

In the Supreme Court, Abbas presents a strong legal defence, but Shazia’s emotional testimony ultimately sways the judges. The Supreme Court rules in her favour, affirming her right to maintenance. The film concludes with Shazia addressing the audience, urging them to read and understand their religious scriptures to prevent their misuse.

== Cast ==
- Yami Gautam Dhar as Shazia Bano, Abbas' first wife (based on Shah Bano)
- Emraan Hashmi as Mohammad Abbas Khan, advocate and Shazia Bano's husband (based on Mohammed Ahmed Khan)
- Vartika Singh as Saira Jahan, Abbas' second wife
- Rudra Chaudhary as Kamran (10-12 years), Shazia and Abbas' son
  - Yatharth as Kamran (14-16 years)
- Vedika as Kaneez (4-6 years), Shazia and Abbas' daughter
  - Kiara Sabharwal as Kaneez (7-9 years)
  - Kiri Prakash Kaur as Kaneez (11-13 years)
- Swar Vinayak Singh as Bilal (7-9 years), Shazia and Abbas's son
- Danish Husain as Maulvi Basheer Anwer, Shazia's father
- Sheeba Chaddha as Bela Jain
- Paridhi Sharma as Iram, younger sister of Abbas, sister in law of Shazia and Saira
- S. M. Zaheer as Maulvi Akhlaq Ashraf Quazi, President of All India Muslim Personal Law Board
- Aseem Hattangady as Faraz Sayeed
- Rahul Mittra as R. N. Tripathi, Aligarh Sessions Court Magistrate
- Anang Desai as H. N. Vashishth, Supreme Court Chief Justice
- Piloo Vidyarthi as Shazia's mother
- Aparna Ghoshal as Rukhsat, Abbas' mother
- Smriti Mishra as Uzma
- Vijay Vikram Singh as Allahabad High Court Judge

== Production ==
Haq is directed by Suparn S. Varma and produced by Junglee Pictures in collaboration with Insomnia Films and Baweja Studios. The screenplay was developed by Reshu Nath, with music composed by Vishal Mishra, Shivam Gupta as the casting director and Vijay Shinde as the VFX director. The film takes creative inspiration from Jigna Vora’s book Bano: Bharat ki Beti, which recounts Shah Bano’s legal struggle and its broader social implications.

The film was shot in Lucknow (Amir-ud-daula Public Library, Safed Baradari, Tomb of Saadat Ali Khan, Akbari Gate), Kakori (for Sankhani scenes), Sandila, Nyotini, Hardoi and Delhi.

=== Legal Issues ===
In October 2025, Siddiqua Begum, the daughter of Shah Bano, issued a legal notice to the CBFC and the makers of Haq, alleging that the film draws from her mother’s 1985 Supreme Court case without her consent. She claimed that the filmmakers had not consulted her and had inaccurately portrayed aspects of her mother’s story. The notice requested a halt to the film’s release, citing potential violations of personality and publicity rights. The production team did not issue any public statement regarding the notice.

In November 2025, Madhya Pradesh High Court dismissed her plea, reiterating that privacy and reputation are not inheritable and extinguish with the person's death. Thus, there was no obligation to seek consent. The court also noted that the film's disclaimer states that the it was a dramatised and fictionalised adaptation of the book Bano: Bharat ki Beti by Jigna Vora.

== Music ==
Haq

Soundtrack album by Vishal Mishra
- Released: 3 November 2025
- Venue: Mumbai
- Studios: Asia Music Vision; 7heaven Studio; YRF Studio; VMS
- Genre: Feature film soundtrack
- Length: 26:04
- Language: Hindi
- Label: Times Music
External audio
- Haq – Audio Jukebox on YouTube

The soundtrack is composed by Vishal Mishra, while Sandeep Chowta composed the background score. All songs are penned by Kaushal Kishore. It was released on Junglee Music.

Aalap Raju serves as the bass guitarist for "Qubool", Keba Jeremiah as the acoustic guitarist for "Kya Paaya" and Dilshad Khan as the sarangi player for "Jhoom Banware".

All lyrics are written by Kaushal Kishore.

Track listing
No.	Title	Singer(s)	Length
1.	"Qubool"	Armaan Khan	4:44
2.	"Dil Tod Gaya Tu"	Vishal Mishra	4:01
3.	"Haq Hai Mera"	Vishal Mishra	4:41
4.	"Kya Paaya"	Ali Brothers	4:19
5.	"Jhoom Banware"	Malini Awasthi, Jyotica Tangri & Bidyut Jyoti Mohan	2:59
6.	"Dil Tod Gaya Tu (Duet Version)"	Akash Ojha & Sneha Shankar	4:01
Total length:			26:04

== Release ==
=== Theatrical ===
The film was released theatrically on 7 November 2025 with a U/A certificate.

=== Home media ===
The film began streaming on Netflix from 2 January 2026. Following its Netflix release on 2 January 2026, the film achieved streaming success, topped the charts in India and ranked second globally among non-English-language films.

== Reception ==
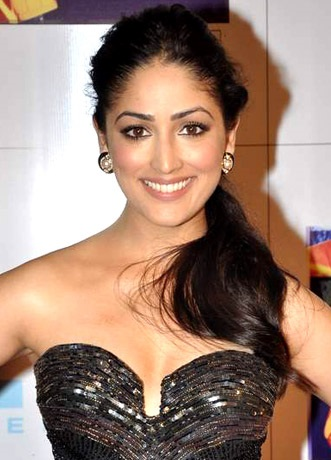
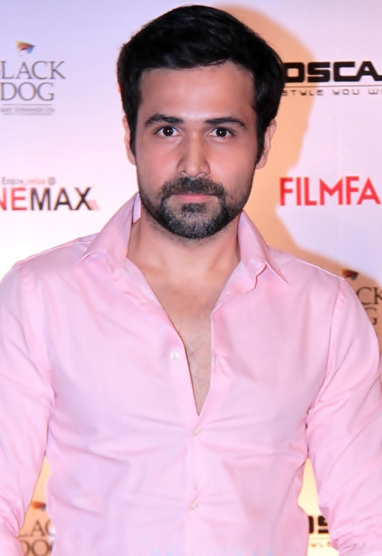
Yami Gautam Dhar and Emraan Hashmi received critical acclaim for their performances in Haq.

Haq received generally positive reviews from critics, in particular praising the impartiality and nuance with which the film covered a subject made contentious by the contemporary political climate of Hindu nationalism as espoused by the Bharatiya Janata Party. Others praised Haq for its heart while others panned the film for being bland. On the review aggregator website Rotten Tomatoes, 71% of 14 critics' reviews are positive, with an average rating of 7.1/10.

Shilajit Mitra of The Hollywood Reporter India observed that "It will be unfair to call Haq a partisan film, though its bland linearity conveys a politics of its own."

Saibal Chatterjee of NDTV rated it 3/5 stars and said that "It is rare for a Bollywood film these days not to froth at the mouth when talking about India's principal minority community and summarily stereotyping it."

Deepa Gahlot of Rediff.com gave 3/5 stars and wrote, "Made at a time when an insidious agenda can be read into it, Haq is an important film that deals with a contentious subject with maturity."

Nandini Ramnath of Scroll.in stated that "The creators of Haq do not want it to be seen as yet another Muslim-baiting screed. The movie’s mission to rescue hapless Muslim women from the clutches of hidebound men is relatively restrained and explored through relatable characters."

Shubhra Gupta of The Indian Express gave it 3.5/5 stars and said that "Yami Gautam Dhar–Emraan Hashmi film achieves what it sets out to do with clear-eyed empathy, giving us an ordinary woman who found extraordinary strength and resilience to fight for her cause, and created, without ever quite realising it, history."

Devesh Sharma of Filmfare gave it 4.5/5 stars and stated that "Haq is a reminder that clarity, reason and moral courage can indeed be cinematic. Watch it for its sincerity, for its grace, for its argument but above all, watch it for the performances that give this battle a beating, breathing human heart. And watch it because it believes that the Indian woman, regardless of faith, deserves the Constitution as her shield, not the mercy of men."

Abhishek Srivastava of The Times of India rated it 4.5/5 stars and wrote that "At its core, ‘Haq’ is a simple story told with sincerity—and that simplicity becomes its biggest triumph."

Lachmi Deb Roy of Firstpost rated it 3.5/5 stars and said that "It is engaging, immersive, hugely relevant and what a beautifully restrained way of storytelling."

Rishabh Suri of Hindustan Times also rated it 3.5/5 stars and wrote that "Haq works more as a conversation starter than a flawless film. Its heart is in the right place, and the powerful performances carry it through even when the storytelling wavers. Suparn’s intent to revive a landmark debate on women’s rights deserves applause."

Sana Farzeen of India Today gave it 4/5 stars and wrote that "Haq is a powerful film inspired by the Shah Bano case, exploring faith and law. It highlights the struggle for women's dignity amidst societal and religious challenges."

Anuj Kumar of The Hindu observed that "Haq not only speaks of women’s rights but also interrogates their costs. It critiques judges who hide behind personal laws and so-called custodians of faith who use religion for vote bank politics." Subhash K Jha of News 24 rated it 4/5 stars and said that "The storytelling is sharp and not afraid to call out the sacred cows and holy ghosts, even if it entails stepping on some toes. What stands out above everything else is the argument that the law cannot be different for a section of Indians."

== Legacy ==
Yami reprised the name "Shazia Bano" for a different character in a cameo appearance in Dhurandhar: The Revenge (2026), which director Suparn S. Varma described as a tribute.
