= Mohd. Ahmed Khan v. Shah Bano Begum =

1985 maintenance (alimony) lawsuit in India

- Court: Supreme Court of India
- Full case name: Mohd. Ahmed Khan v. Shah Bano Begum & Ors.
- Decided: 23 April 1985
- Citation: 1985 (1) SCALE 767; 1985 (3) SCR 844; 1985 (2) SCC 556; AIR 1985 SC 945

Case history
- Prior action: Criminal Revision No. 320 of 1979, Madhya Pradesh High Court

Court membership
- Judges sitting: Y. V. Chandrachud, Ranganath Misra, D. A. Desai, O. Chinnappa Reddy, E. S. Venkataramiah

Case opinions
- A woman has a right to claim maintenance under Section 125 of CrPC as the Code is a criminal law and not a civil law.
- Decision by: Y. V. Chandrachud (Chief Justice)

Laws applied
- Code of Criminal Procedure (CrPC), Muslim Personal Law (Shariat) Application Act, 1937, Indian Penal Code

Mohd. Ahmed Khan v. Shah Bano Begum & Ors. (1985), commonly referred to as the Shah Bano case, was a criminal lawsuit in India, in which the Supreme Court delivered a judgment in favour of providing maintenance (alimony) to an aggrieved divorced Muslim woman, Shah Bano Begum from Indore, who had been divorced by her husband Mohammed Ahmed Khan in 1978.

The All India Muslim Personal Law Board (AIMPLB) and Jamiat Ulema-e-Hind (JUH) mounted a campaign for the verdict's nullification. The judgement in favour of the woman in this case evoked criticisms among Muslims, some of whom cited the Quran to show that the judgement was in conflict with Islamic law. It triggered controversy about the extent of having different personal laws for different religions in India.

The case caused the Congress government under Rajiv Gandhi, with its absolute majority, to pass the Muslim Women (Protection of Rights on Divorce) Act 1986, which diluted the judgment of the Supreme Court and restricted the right of Muslim divorcées to alimony from their former husbands for only 90 days after the divorce (the period of iddat in Islamic law), shifting the responsibility of maintaining woman to her relatives or the waqf boards. The law was seen as discriminatory as it denied the right to basic maintenance available to Muslim women under secular law. However, in later judgements, including Danial Latifi v. Union of India (2001) and Shamima Farooqui v. Shahid Khan (2015), the Supreme Court of India interpreted the act in a manner reassuring the validity of the case and consequently upheld the Shah Bano judgement, and The Muslim Women (Protection of Rights on Divorce) Act 1986 was nullified. Some Muslims, including the All India Shia Personal Law Board (AISPLB), supported the Supreme Court's order to make the right to maintenance of a divorced Muslim wife absolute.

== Background ==
While the Hindu code bills reformed Hindu personal law in India in the 1950s, Muslim personal law was kept away from any reforms. Though the frequent conflict between secular and Muslim religious authorities over the issue of uniform civil code eventually decreased, until the 1985 Shah Bano case. Besides this case, two other Muslim women had previously received maintenance under the Code of Criminal Procedure (CrPC) in 1979 and 1980.

In 1932, Shah Bano (1916–1992), a Muslim woman, was married to Mohammed Ahmed Khan (1912–2006), an affluent and well-known advocate in Indore, Madhya Pradesh, and had 5 children (3 sons and 2 daughters) from the marriage. Bano, was Mohammed Ahmed Khan's first cousin from his mother's side. After 14 years, Khan took a younger woman, Halima Begum, as his second wife. Halima was also his cousin from his mother's side, with whom Khan had 7 children, 6 daughters and 1 son. Both Bano and the younger woman were cousins. Then after years of living with both wives, he evicted her and their children from the home in 1975 but started paying her a maintenance. In April 1978, when Khan stopped giving her the regular maintenance ₹200 per month he had promised, claiming that she had no means to support herself and her children, Bano filed a criminal suit at a local court in Indore, against her husband under Section 125 (the "maintenance of wives, children and parents" provision which applied to all citizens irrespective of religion) of the CrPC, asking him for a maintenance amount of ₹500 for herself and her children. In November 1978, Khan gave an irrevocable talaq (divorce) when she was 62 years old through the triple talaq procedure (saying "I divorce thee" three times); which was his prerogative under Islamic law and took up the defence that since Bano had ceased to be his wife and therefore he was under no obligation to provide maintenance for her as except prescribed under the Islamic law which he claimed was in total ₹5,400 (including mahr, maintenance prior to divorce, and maintenance for the three-month iddat period following the divorce). In August 1979, the local court directed Khan to pay a sum of ₹25 per month to Bano by way of maintenance. On 1 July 1980, on a revisional application of Bano, the High Court of Madhya Pradesh enhanced the amount of maintenance to ₹179.20 per month. Khan then filed a petition to appeal before the Supreme Court claiming that he had fulfilled all his obligations under Islamic law and that Bano is not his responsibility anymore because he had a second marriage which is permitted under Islamic law.

=== Supreme Court judgment ===
On 3 February 1981, the two judge bench composed of Justice Murtaza Fazal Ali and A. Varadarajan who first heard the matter, in light of the earlier decisions of the court which had held that Section 125 of the CrPC applies to Muslims also, referred Khan's appeal to a larger Bench. Muslim bodies All India Muslim Personal Law Board (AIMPLB) and Jamiat Ulema-e-Hind (JUH) joined the case as intervenor. The matter was then heard by a five-judge bench composed of then Chief Justice Chandrachud, Ranganath Misra, D. A. Desai, O. Chinnappa Reddy, and E. S. Venkataramiah. On 23 April 1985, Supreme Court in a unanimous decision, dismissed the appeal and confirmed the judgment of the High Court.

The Supreme Court concluded that "there is no conflict between the provisions of Section 125 and those of the Muslim personal law on the question of the Muslim husband's obligation to provide maintenance for a divorced wife who is unable to maintain herself." After referring to the Quran, holding it to the greatest authority on the subject, it held that there was no doubt that the Quran imposes an obligation on the Muslim husband to make provision for or to provide maintenance to the divorced wife. Bano approached the courts for securing maintenance from her husband. When the case reached the Supreme Court, seven years had elapsed. The Supreme Court invoked Section 125 of the CrPC, which applies to everyone regardless of caste, creed, or religion. It ruled that Bano be given maintenance money, similar to alimony.

The Court also regretted that Article 44 of the Constitution of India in relation to bringing of Uniform Civil Code in India remained a dead letter and held that a common civil code will help the cause of national integration by removing disparate loyalties to laws which have conflicting ideologies.

== Movement against the judgment ==
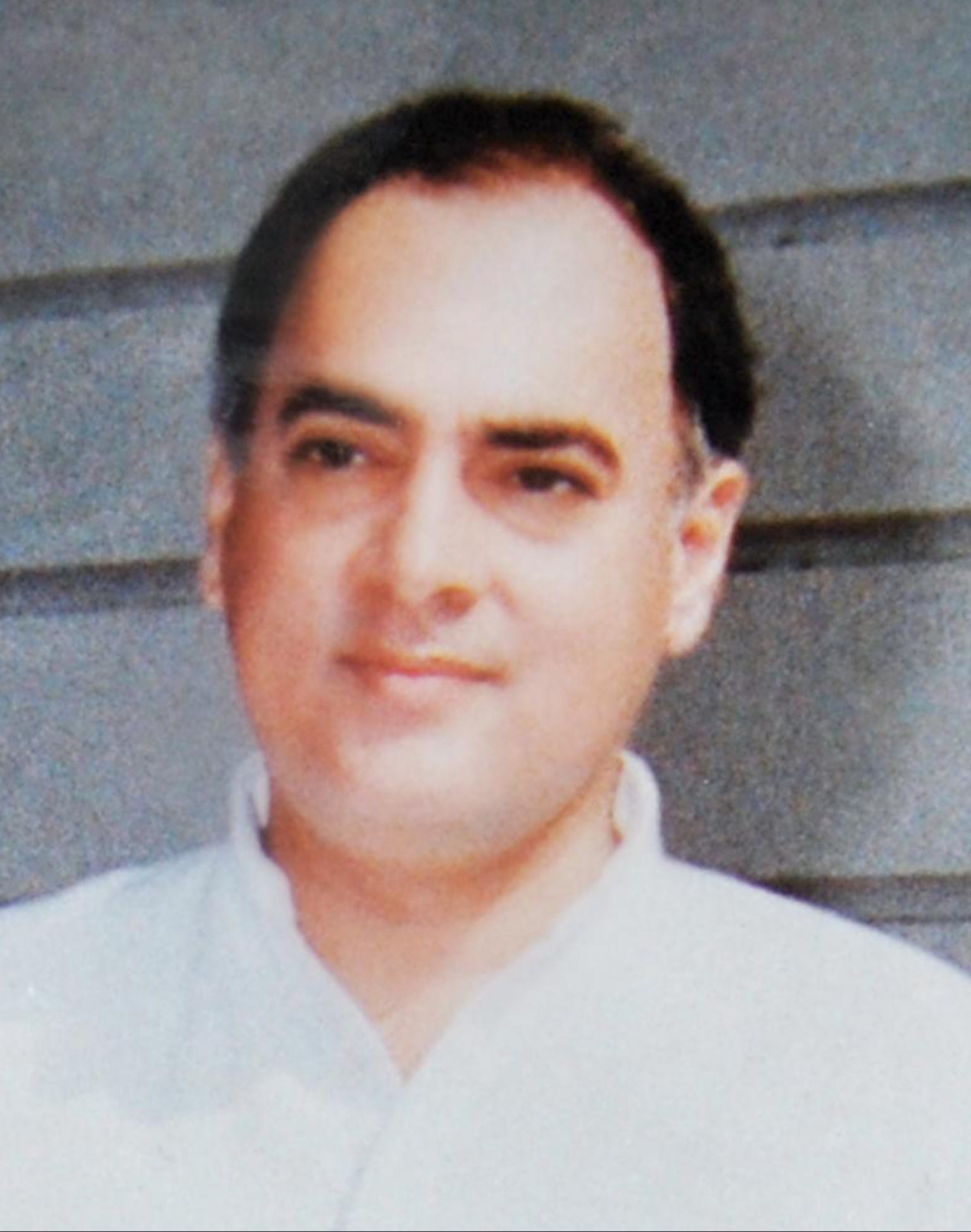
Rajiv Gandhi's Congress party lost some by-elections in 1985 after it endorsed the Supreme Court's decision supporting Bano but later reversed its stand.

The Shah Bano judgment became the centre of a widely debated controversy, with the press turning it into a major national issue.

After the 1984 anti-Sikh riots, minorities in India, with Muslims being the largest, felt threatened with the need to safeguard their culture. The AIMPLB defended the application of their laws and supported Muslim conservatives who accused the government of promoting Hindu dominance over every Indian citizen at the expense of minorities. The CrPC was seen as a threat to Muslim personal law, which they considered their cultural identity. According to them, the judiciary recommending a uniform civil code was evidence that Hindu values would be imposed over every Indian. The Shah Bano judgment elicited a protest from many sections of Muslims who also took to the streets against what they believed as an attack on their religion and their right to their own religious personal laws. Some Muslims felt threatened by what they perceived as an encroachment on the Muslim personal law, and protested loudly against the judgment. The spokesmen for some were the Barelvi leader Obaidullah Khan Azmi and Syed Kazi. At the forefront was AIMPLB, an organization formed in 1973 devoted to upholding what they see as sharia.

The orthodox Muslims felt that their communal identity was at stake if their personal laws were governed by the judiciary. Rajiv Gandhi's Congress government, which previously had the support of Muslim minorities, lost some by-elections (including Kishanganj to Syed Shahabuddin) in December 1985, because of its endorsement of the Supreme Court's decision. The members of the AIMPLB including the losing party to the lawsuit, Mohammed Ahmed Khan, started a campaign for complete autonomy in their personal laws. The debate soon reached the national level with participation from legislators, ministers and journalists. The press played a considerable role in sensationalizing this incident.

== Opposition to the judgment crystallizes the Muslim Women (Protection of Rights on Divorce) Bill ==
In the 1984 Indian general election, Indian National Congress had won absolute majority in the parliament. After the Shah Bano judgment, many leaders in the Indian National Congress suggested to the prime minister Rajiv Gandhi that if the government did not enact a law in parliament overturning the Supreme Court judgement, the Congress would face severe opposition in the polls ahead. This is however, a more sensationalist view and more measured opinions, based in historic records suggest that conservatives within and allied to the Congress, including Najma Heptullah and Ziaur Rahman Ansari, heavily influenced Rajiv Gandhi's decision. Accounts suggest that Mr. Ansari threatened Gandhi with resignation, unless the party took action against the judgement.

Following such zealous support for an alternative to the Shah Bano judgement, The Muslim Women (Protection of Rights on Divorce) Bill was then drafted by the Ministry of Law and Justice, under close consultation with Dr. Tahir Mahmood (an expert on Islamic personal law) and other groups such as the All India Muslim Personal Law Board. When introduced in the Parliament, most of the Congress party reversed its previous position in favor of the judgement and supported this bill. However many on the Hindu right, the Left, Muslim liberals and women's organisations, and individuals within the Congress itself, strongly opposed it. Indeed, Gandhi himself was reportedly opposed and requested another Congress leader, Arif Mohammad Khan, erstwhile Minister of State, to speak in Parliament against the Bill.

The parliament eventually passed the Muslim Women (Protection of Rights on Divorce) Act 1986, with the aim of nullifying the Supreme Court's judgment in the Shah Bano judgment. Senior leaders such as ND Tiwari and Arjun Singh had crucial roles to play in the Congress's acquiescence of the Bill.

Diluting the Supreme Court judgment, supporters such as the MLPB intended the act to allow maintenance to a divorced woman only for the period of iddat, or till 90 days after the divorce, according to the provisions of Islamic law. This made Section 125 of the CrPC inapplicable to Muslim women. The 'liability' of husband to pay the maintenance was thus restricted to the period of the iddat only.". However, the technicality in the language itself, within Section 3 read "reasonable and fair provision to be made and paid within the period of iddat." In practice, this meant that it left open an incredibly large aperture for courts to decide what was "fair and reasonable", and demand that it be paid within the period of iddat, and not just for the period of iddat, as the original conservative supporters of the Bill intended.

The "Statement of Objects and Reasons" of the act stated that "the Shah Bano decision had led to some controversy as to the obligation of the Muslim husband to pay maintenance to the divorced wife and hence opportunity was therefore taken to specify the rights which a Muslim divorced woman is entitled to at the time of divorce and to protect her interests."

=== Reactions to the act ===
The law received severe criticism from several sections of society. The All India Democratic Women's Association (AIDWA) organised demonstrations of Muslim women against the move to deprive them of rights that they had hitherto shared with the Hindus. Indeed, 125 prominent Muslims wrote a memorandum directly to the Prime Minister Rajiv Gandhi, decrying the Act.

The opposition called it another act of "appeasement" towards Muslims by the Indian National Congress, with the Bharatiya Janata Party regarding it as "discriminatory" to non-Muslim men, and as a supposed "violation of the sanctity of the country's highest court". BJP-aligned lawyer Ram Jethmalani termed the act as "retrogressive obscurantism for short-term minority populism".

Rajiv Gandhi's colleague Arif Mohammad Khan who was INC member and a minister in Gandhi's cabinet resigned from the post and party given that he had passionately argued against the Bill in Parliament, and now the party itself had supported its passage into an Act.

Critics of the Act point out that while divorce is within the purview of personal laws, maintenance is not, and thus it is discriminatory to exclude Muslim women from a civil law. Exclusion of non-Muslim men from a law that appears inherently beneficial to men is also pointed out by them. Critics have repeatedly contended that a separate Muslim code is tantamount to preferential treatment and demanded a uniform civil code.

The politicisation led to the argument having two major sides: the Congress and Muslim conservatives versus the Hindus, Sikhs, Jains, Buddhists, Parsis, and the Left. In 1987, the Minister of Social Welfare, Rajendra Kumari Bajpai, reported that no women were given maintenance by the Waqf Board in 1986. Women activists highlighted their legal status and according to them the "main problem is that there [are] many laws but women are dominated not by secular laws, not by uniform civil laws, but by religious laws." The legal reversal of introducing the act significantly hampered the nationwide women's movement in the 1980s. However, the subsequent

The conservative debate also centred on whether the trial of personal law should be restricted to religious arbitrators (such as Muslim qadis) and whether woman's rights should be restricted to internal religious reforms.

== Later developments ==
The Act has led to Muslim women receiving a large, one-time payment from their husbands during the period of iddat, instead of a maximum monthly payment of ₹500 – an upper limit which has since been removed. Cases of women getting lump sum payments for lifetime maintenance are becoming common. However it is seen that despite its feature of no ceiling on quantum of maintenance, the Act is sparingly used because of the lack of its knowledge even among lawyers. The legal fraternity generally uses the CrPC while moving maintenance petitions, considering it handy.

The Shah Bano case had once again spurred the debate on the Uniform Civil Code in India. The Hindu right, led by parties like the Jan Sangh in its metamorphosis as the Bharatiya Janata Party, became an advocate for secular laws across the board. However, their opposition to the reforms was based on the argument that no similar provisions would be applied for the Muslims on the claim that they weren't sufficiently advanced. The pressure exerted by orthodox Muslims caused women's organizations and secularists to cave in.

This case had long term implications. The case became a milestone in Muslim women's fight for equal rights in matters of marriage and divorce in regular courts.

Under severe pressure from conservative groups, Bano later publicly requested that the Supreme Court withdraw its verdict. She died of brain haemorrhage in 1992.

== Challenge to the validity of the Act ==
The constitutional validity of Muslim Women (Protection of Rights on Divorce) Act 1986 was challenged before the Supreme Court in Danial Latifi & Anr v. Union Of India by Daniel Latifi in 2001, who was the lawyer of Bano. The Supreme Court tried to maintain a balancing act, attempting to uphold Muslim women's rights without addressing the constitutionality of gender and religious discrimination in personal law. Court reiterated the validity of the Shah Bano judgment. The AIMPLB, an intervenor, questioned the authority of the court to interpret religious texts.

The Court concluded that the Act does not, in fact, preclude maintenance for divorced Muslim women, and that Muslim men must pay spousal support until such time as the divorced wife remarries. However the Court held that if the Act accorded Muslim divorcees unequal rights to spousal support compared with the provisions of the secular law under Section 125 of the CrPC, then the law would in fact, be unconstitutional. Further the Supreme Court construed the statutory provision in such a manner that it does not fall foul of Article 14 and Article 15 of the Constitution of India. The provision in question is Section 3(1)(a) of the Muslim Women (Protection of Rights on Divorce) Act, 1986 which states that "a reasonable and fair provision and maintenance to be made and paid to her within the iddat period by her former husband". The Court held this provision means that reasonable and fair provision and maintenance is not limited for the iddat period (as evidenced by the use of word "within" and not "for"). It extends for the entire life of the divorced wife until she remarries.

== Cultural depiction ==
A 2025 Indian film titled Haq is inspired by the Shah Bano case. Directed by Suparn S. Varma and produced by Junglee Pictures in association with Insomnia Films and Baweja Studios, the film stars Emraan Hashmi and Yami Gautam as the parties involved in the lawsuit. The film’s narrative is inspired by Jigna Vora’s book Bano: Bharat Ki Beti, which fictionalises the emotional and legal challenges faced by a woman fighting for her rights within patriarchal and religious systems.

The film was shot in Lucknow (Amir-ud-daula Public Library, Safed Baradari, Tomb of Saadat Ali Khan, Akbari Gate), Kakori (for Sankhani scenes), Sandila, Nyotini, Hardoi and Delhi.

The case is also featured in the 2013 Indian docudrama TV series Pradhanmantri, which covers the tenure of Rajiv Gandhi and other Indian prime ministers.

== See also ==
- Bharatiya Nagarik Suraksha Sanhita
- Saifuddin Choudhury – Indian politician
- Triple talaq in India
