= List of biographical films of the 2020s =

The following is a list of biographical films released in the 2020s.

== 2020 ==
Film	Subject(s)	Portrayed by
I Still Believe	Jeremy Camp	KJ Apa
Chhapaak	Laxmi Agarwal	Deepika Padukone
Louis van Beethoven	Ludwig van Beethoven	Colin Pütz (young); Anselm Bresgott (adult); Tobias Moretti (older)
Misbehaviour	Sally Alexander	Keira Knightley
Misbehaviour	Jennifer Hosten - Miss Grenada	Gugu Mbatha-Raw
Capone	Al Capone	Tom Hardy
Roe v. Wade	Bernard Nathanson	Nick Loeb
Gunjan Saxena: The Kargil Girl	Gunjan Saxena	Janhvi Kapoor
Leap	Lang Ping	Gong Li
Leave 'em Laughing	Dick Shawn	Matthew Glave
Helene	Helene Schjerfbeck	Laura Birn
Miss Marx	Eleanor Marx	Romola Garai
Miss Marx	Edward Aveling	Patrick Kennedy
Escape from Pretoria	Tim Jenkin	Daniel Radcliffe
Escape from Pretoria	Stephen Lee	Daniel Webber
Escape from Pretoria	Denis Goldberg	Ian Hart
Escape from Pretoria	Leonard Fontaine	Mark Leonard Winter
Blackjack: The Jackie Ryan Story	Jackie Ryan	Greg Finley
Dream Horse	Jan Vokes	Toni Collette
Dream Horse	Philip Hobbs	Nicholas Farrell
Suarez: The Healing Priest	Fernando Suarez	John Arcilla (older); Jin Macapagal (young)
The Clark Sisters: First Ladies of Gospel	Twinkie Clark	Christina Bell
The Clark Sisters: First Ladies of Gospel	Karen Clark Sheard	Kierra Sheard
The Clark Sisters: First Ladies of Gospel	Dorinda Clark-Cole	Sheléa Frazier
The Clark Sisters: First Ladies of Gospel	Denise Clark-Bradford	Raven Goodwin
The Clark Sisters: First Ladies of Gospel	Jacky Clark Chisholm	Angela Birchett
Joe Bell	Joe Bell	Mark Wahlberg
Joe Bell	Jadin Bell	Reid Miller
Enfant Terrible	Rainer Werner Fassbinder	Oliver Masucci
Streltsov	Eduard Streltsov	Alexander Petrov
Faithful	Fernand Iveton	Vincent Lacoste
Faithful	Hélène Iveton	Vicky Krieps
The Comey Rule	James Comey	Jeff Daniels
The Comey Rule	Donald Trump	Brendan Gleeson
Tigers	Martin Bengtsson	Erik Enge
Clouds	Zach Sobiech	Fin Argus
The Glorias	Gloria Steinem	Julianne Moore (older), Alicia Vikander (adult); Lulu Wilson (teen), Ryan Kira Armstrong (young)
Resistance	Marcel Marceau	Jesse Eisenberg
Taanaji: The Unsung Warrior	Tanaji Malusare	Ajay Devgn
Emperor	Shields Green	Dayo Okeniyi
Ammonite	Mary Anning	Kate Winslet
Ammonite	Charlotte Murchison	Saoirse Ronan
Hillbilly Elegy	JD Vance	Gabriel Basso (older); Owen Asztalos (young)
Hillbilly Elegy	Beverly "Bev" Vance	Amy Adams (older); Tierney Smith (young)
Hillbilly Elegy	Bonnie "Mamaw" Vance	Glenn Close (older); Sunny Mabrey (young)
Hillbilly Elegy	Lindsay Vance	Haley Bennett
Hillbilly Elegy	Usha Vance	Freida Pinto
Hillbilly Elegy	Jim "Papaw" Vance	Bo Hopkins (older); Brett Lorenzini (young)
The Trial of the Chicago 7	Abbie Hoffman	Sacha Baron Cohen
The Trial of the Chicago 7	Tom Hayden	Eddie Redmayne
The Trial of the Chicago 7	Jerry Rubin	Jeremy Strong
The Trial of the Chicago 7	David Dellinger	John Carroll Lynch
The Trial of the Chicago 7	Rennie Davis	Alex Sharp
The Trial of the Chicago 7	John Froines	Daniel Flaherty
The Trial of the Chicago 7	Lee Weiner	Noah Robbins
The Trial of the Chicago 7	Bobby Seale	Yahya Abdul-Mateen II
Mrs. America	Phyllis Schlafly	Cate Blanchett
Mrs. America	Gloria Steinem	Rose Byrne
Mrs. America	Shirley Chisholm	Uzo Aduba
Mrs. America	Jill Ruckelshaus	Elizabeth Banks
Mrs. America	Bella Abzug	Margo Martindale
Mrs. America	Betty Friedan	Tracey Ullman
Mrs. America	Fred Schlafly	John Slattery
Worth	Kenneth Feinberg	Michael Keaton
The Terrible	Ivan the Terrible	Sergei Makovetsky (older); Aleksandr Yatsenko (young)
Adventures of a Mathematician	Stanisław Ulam	Philippe Tłokiński
De Gaulle	Charles de Gaulle	Lambert Wilson
De Gaulle	Yvonne de Gaulle	Isabelle Carré
Shakuntala Devi	Shakuntala Devi	Vidya Balan
Son of the South	Bob Zellner	Lucas Till
Safety	Ray McElrathbey	Jay Reeves (older); Javien Jackson (young)
Shirley	Shirley Jackson	Elisabeth Moss
Shirley	Stanley Edgar Hyman	Michael Stuhlbarg
Sergio	Sérgio Vieira de Mello	Wagner Moura
Hamilton	Alexander Hamilton	Lin-Manuel Miranda
Tesla	Nikola Tesla	Ethan Hawke
The Good Traitor	Henrik Kauffmann	Ulrich Thomsen
AK-47	Mikhail Kalashnikov	Yuri Borisov
The Courier	Greville Wynne	Benedict Cumberbatch
Street Survivors: The True Story of the Lynyrd Skynyrd Plane Crash	Members of Lynyrd Skynyrd	Various Actors
Josep	Josep Bartolí	Sergi López (voice)
Self Made	Madam C. J. Walker	Octavia Spencer
Mogul	Gulshan Kumar	Aamir Khan
Percy	Percy Schmeiser	Christopher Walken
Selena: The Series	Selena Quintanilla	Christian Serratos (older); Madison Taylor Baez (young)
Selena: The Series	A.B. Quintanilla	Gabriel Chavarria (older); Juan Martinez (young)
Selena: The Series	Abraham Quintanilla	Ricardo Antonio Chavira (older); Brandol Ruiz (young)
Selena: The Series	Suzette Quintanilla	Noemi Gonzalez (older); Daniela Estrada (young)
Selena: The Series	Marcella Quintanilla	Seidy López (older); Aneasa Yacoub (young)
Stardust	David Bowie	Johnny Flynn
Critical Thinking	Mario Martinez	John Leguizamo
Scam 1992	Harshad Mehta	Pratik Gandhi (older); Vishesh Bansal (young)
Scam 1992	Sucheta Dalal	Shreya Dhanwanthary
Ma Rainey's Black Bottom	Ma Rainey	Viola Davis
Mank	Herman J. Mankiewicz	Gary Oldman
Mank	Marion Davies	Amanda Seyfried
Mank	Orson Welles	Tom Burke
Beyond That Mountain	Stephen Kim Sou-hwan	Lee Kyung-hoon
Tove	Tove Jansson	Alma Pöysti
One Night in Miami...	Malcolm X	Kingsley Ben-Adir
One Night in Miami...	Cassius Clay	Eli Goree
One Night in Miami...	Jim Brown	Aldis Hodge
One Night in Miami...	Sam Cooke	Leslie Odom Jr.

== 2021 ==
Film	Subject(s)	Portrayed by
King Richard	Richard Williams	Will Smith
Wendy Williams: The Movie	Wendy Williams	Ciera Payton
Bhuj: The Pride of India	Vijay Karnik	Ajay Devgn
Bhuj: The Pride of India	Ranchordas Pagi	Sanjay Dutt
Mediterraneo: The Law of the Sea	Òscar Camps	Eduard Fernández
Tick, Tick... Boom!	Jonathan Larson	Andrew Garfield
I Am Zlatan	Zlatan Ibrahimović	Granit Rushiti (older); Dominic Andersson Bajraktari (young)
Pagten	Karen Blixen	Birthe Neumann
To Olivia	Roald Dahl	Hugh Bonneville
To Olivia	Patricia Neal	Keeley Hawes
Ted K	Ted Kaczynski	Sharlto Copley
Ted Bundy: American Boogeyman	Ted Bundy	Chad Michael Murray
Aileen Wuornos: American Boogeywoman	Aileen Wuornos	Peyton List
Methagu	Velupillai Prabhakaran	Kutti Manni
Main Mulayam Singh Yadav	Mulayam Singh Yadav	Amyth Sethi
The Phantom of the Open	Maurice Flitcroft	Mark Rylance
God of Cricket	Sachin Tendulkar	Sangram Singh
Kaagaz	Lal Bihari	Pankaj Tripathi
Respect	Aretha Franklin	Jennifer Hudson (older); Skye Dakota Turner (young)
Lansky	Meyer Lansky	Harvey Keitel (older); John Magaro (young)
Nitram	Martin Bryant	Caleb Landry Jones
Break Every Chain	Jonathan Hickory	Ignacyo Matynia
The Woman Who Robbed the Stagecoach	Pearl Hart	Cat Roberts
Legend of Destruction	Ben Batich	Shuli Rand (Hebrew voice); Oscar Isaac (English voice)
Legend of Destruction	Yohanan ben Zakkai	Moni Moshonov (Hebrew voice); Elliott Gould (English voice)
Legend of Destruction	Simon bar Giora	Amos Tamam (Hebrew voice); Billy Zane (English voice)
Ayinla	Ayinla Omowura	Lateef Adedimeji
Man of God	Nectarios of Aegina	Aris Servetalis
Margrete: Queen of the North	Margaret I of Denmark	Trine Dyrholm
Zátopek	Emil Zátopek	Václav Neužil
Zátopek	Dana Zátopková	Martha Issová
Marakkar: Arabikadalinte Simham	Kunjali Marakkar IV	Mohanlal
Leonardo	Leonardo da Vinci	Aidan Turner
The King of Tears, Lee Bang-won	Taejong of Joseon	Joo Sang-wook
The King of Tears, Lee Bang-won	Taejo of Joseon	Kim Yeong-cheol
The King of Tears, Lee Bang-won	Queen Wongyeong	Park Jin-hee
The King of Tears, Lee Bang-won	Queen Sindeok	Ye Ji-won
BMF	Demetrius "Big Meech" Flenory	Demetrius Flenory Jr.
BMF	Charles Flenory	Russell Hornsby
BMF	Terry "Southwest T" Flenory	Da'Vinchi
BMF	Lucille Flenory	Michole Briana White
Dear Thomas	Thomas Brasch	Albrecht Schuch
Spencer	Diana, Princess of Wales	Kristen Stewart
Badamasi	Ibrahim Babangida	Enyinna Nwigwe
The Serpent	Charles Sobhraj	Tahar Rahim
The Serpent	Marie-Andrée Leclerc	Jenna Coleman
Munich – The Edge of War	Neville Chamberlain	Jeremy Irons
Passport to Freedom	Aracy de Carvalho	Sophie Charlotte
Passport to Freedom	João Guimarães Rosa	Rodrigo Lombardi
The King of Laughter	Eduardo Scarpetta	Toni Servillo
Charlotte	Charlotte Salomon	Keira Knightley (voice)
No Man of God	Bill Hagmaier	Elijah Wood
No Man of God	Ted Bundy	Luke Kirby
Toma	Toma Zdravković	Milan Marić
Toma	Silvana Armenulić	Tamara Dragičević
Eiffel	Gustave Eiffel	Romain Duris
Benediction	Siegfried Sassoon	Jack Lowden (young); Peter Capaldi (older)
Baggio: The Divine Ponytail	Roberto Baggio	Andrea Arcangeli
The Harder They Fall	Nat Love	Jonathan Majors (older); Chase Dillon (young)
The Harder They Fall	Rufus Buck	Idris Elba
The Harder They Fall	Stagecoach Mary	Zazie Beetz
The Harder They Fall	Trudy Smith	Regina King
The Harder They Fall	Bass Reeves	Delroy Lindo
The Harder They Fall	Cherokee Bill	Lakeith Stanfield
The Harder They Fall	Jim Beckwourth	RJ Cyler
The Harder They Fall	Cuffee	Danielle Deadwyler
The Harder They Fall	Bill Pickett	Edi Gathegi
The Harder They Fall	Wiley Escoe	Deon Cole
Nyaay: The Justice	Sushant Singh Rajput	Zuber K. Khan
Nyaay: The Justice	Rhea Chakraborty	Shreya Shukla
The Dig	Edith Pretty	Carey Mulligan
The Dig	Basil Brown	Ralph Fiennes
Orders from Above	Avner Less	Richard Cotter
Orders from Above	Adolf Eichmann	Peter J. Donnelly
Grace and Grit	Treya Wilber	Mena Suvari
Grace and Grit	Ken Wilber	Stuart Townsend
The Most Reluctant Convert	C. S. Lewis	Max McLean (older); Nicholas Ralph (adult); Eddie Ray Martin (young)
Colin in Black & White	Colin Kaepernick	Jaden Michael
Thalaivi	J. Jayalalithaa	Kangana Ranaut
The Last Duel	Jean de Carrouges	Matt Damon
The Last Duel	Jacques Le Gris	Adam Driver
The Last Duel	Marguerite de Carrouges	Jodie Comer
Left for Dead: The Ashley Reeves Story	Ashley Reeves	Anwen O'Driscoll
Saina	Saina Nehwal	Parineeti Chopra
Creation Stories	Alan McGee	Ewen Bremner
The Mauritanian	Mohamedou Ould Salahi	Tahar Rahim
The Electrical Life of Louis Wain	Louis Wain	Benedict Cumberbatch
Halston	Halston	Ewan McGregor
Halston	Elsa Peretti	Rebecca Dayan
Halston	Joe Eula	David Pittu
Halston	Liza Minnelli	Krysta Rodriguez
Halston	David J. Mahoney	Bill Pullman
Maradona: Blessed Dream	Diego Maradona	Juan Palomino (older); Nazareno Casero (teen); Nicolás Goldschmidt (young)
Last Testament	Ricky Rodriguez	Dominick Alesia
Montford: The Chickasaw Rancher	Montford Johnson	Martin Sensmeier
Sardar Udham Singh	Udham Singh	Vicky Kaushal
Impeachment: American Crime Story	Linda Tripp, Monica Lewinsky, Paula Jones, Bill Clinton, Hillary Clinton and Lucianne Goldberg	Sarah Paulson, Beanie Feldstein, Annaleigh Ashford, Clive Owen, Edie Falco and Margo Martindale
The Eyes of Tammy Faye	Tammy Faye Messner	Jessica Chastain
The Eyes of Tammy Faye	Jim Bakker	Andrew Garfield
Judas and the Black Messiah	Fred Hampton	Daniel Kaluuya
Judas and the Black Messiah	William O'Neal	Lakeith Stanfield
Benedetta	Benedetta Carlini	Virginie Efira
Robin Roberts Presents: Mahalia	Mahalia Jackson	Danielle Brooks
The Survivor	Harry Haft	Ben Foster
The Pilot. A Battle for Survival	Nikolai Komlev	Pyotr Fyodorov
Zero to Hero	So Wa Wai	Louis Cheung
Anita	Anita Mui	Louise Wong
83	Members of the India National Cricket Team	Various actors
Secrets of a Gold Digger Killer	Celeste Beard	Julie Benz
The United States vs. Billie Holiday	Billie Holiday	Andra Day
Being the Ricardos	Lucille Ball	Nicole Kidman
Being the Ricardos	Desi Arnaz	Javier Bardem
Young Rock	Dwayne Johnson	Adrian Groulx (young); Bradley Constant (teen); Uli Latukefu (adult)
Madame Claude	Madame Claude	Karole Rocher
American Underdog	Kurt Warner	Zachary Levi (older); Beau Hart (young)
A Journal for Jordan	Charles Monroe King	Michael B. Jordan
A Journal for Jordan	Dana Canedy	Chanté Adams
House of Gucci	Patrizia Reggiani	Lady Gaga
House of Gucci	Maurizio Gucci	Adam Driver
House of Gucci	Paolo Gucci	Jared Leto
House of Gucci	Rodolfo Gucci	Jeremy Irons
House of Gucci	Aldo Gucci	Al Pacino

== 2022 ==
Film	Subject(s)	Portrayed by
Elvis	Elvis Presley	Austin Butler
Blonde	Marilyn Monroe	Ana de Armas
Jhund	Vijay Barse	Amitabh Bachchan
Hansan: Rising Dragon	Yi Sun-sin	Park Hae-il
Rise	Giannis Antetokounmpo	Uche Agada
Rise	Thanasis Antetokounmpo	Ral Agada
Inventing Anna	Anna Sorokin	Julia Garner
Dharmaveer	Anand Dighe	Prasad Oak (older); Shivraj Waichal (young)
Super Pumped	Travis Kalanick	Joseph Gordon-Levitt
The Thing About Pam	Pam Hupp	Renee Zellweger
Angelyne	Angelyne	Emmy Rossum
Father Stu	Fr. Stuart Long	Mark Wahlberg
I'm Charlie Walker	Charlie Walker	Mike Colter
Intersection: Glad to Have You Eren	Eren Bülbül	Rahman Beşel
Gierek	Edward Gierek	Michał Koterski
Winning Time: The Rise of the Lakers Dynasty	Jerry Buss	John C. Reilly
Chiara	Chiara	Margherita Mazzucco
Gangubai Kathiawadi	Gangubai Kothewali	Alia Bhatt
Against the Ice	Ejnar Mikkelsen	Nikolaj Coster-Waldau
Pam & Tommy	Pamela Anderson	Lily James
Pam & Tommy	Tommy Lee	Sebastian Stan
Bergen	Bergen	Farah Zeynep Abdullah
Pistol	Steve Jones	Toby Wallace
Whina	Whina Cooper	Rena Owen (older); Miriama McDowell (young)
Prorok	Stefan Wyszyński	Sławomir Grzymkowski
WeCrashed	Adam Neumann	Jared Leto
WeCrashed	Rebekah Neumann	Anne Hathaway
Pinball: The Man Who Saved the Game	Roger Sharpe	Mike Faist
The Lost King	Philippa Langley	Sally Hawkins
The Lost King	John Langley	Steve Coogan
The Lost King	King Richard III	Harry Lloyd
The Offer	Albert S. Ruddy	Miles Teller
The Offer	Robert Evans	Matthew Goode
The Offer	Francis Ford Coppola	Dan Fogler
The Offer	Charles Bluhdorn	Burn Gorman
The Offer	Joseph Colombo	Giovanni Ribisi
The Offer	Bettye McCartt	Juno Temple
Candy	Candy Montgomery	Jessica Biel
Candy	Betty Gore	Melanie Lynskey
Candy	Allan Gore	Pablo Schreiber
Candy	Pat Montgomery	Timothy Simons
Candy	Don Crowder	Raúl Esparza
Black Bird	James "Jimmy" Keene	Taron Egerton
Black Bird	Larry Hall	Paul Walter Hauser
Rescued by Ruby	Daniel O'Neil	Grant Gustin
Rescued by Ruby	Ruby	Bear
Khudiram Bose	Khudiram Bose	Rakesh Jagarlamudi
Oussekine	Georges Kiejman	Kad Merad
Oussekine	Malik Oussekine	Sayyid El Alami
Methagu 2	Velupillai Prabhakaran	Gowrishankar
The First Lady	Michelle Obama	Viola Davis (older); Jayme Lawson (young)
The First Lady	Betty Ford	Michelle Pfeiffer (older); Kristine Froseth (young)
The First Lady	Eleanor Roosevelt	Gillian Anderson (older); Eliza Scanlen (young)
RRR	Komaram Bheem	N. T. Rama Rao Jr.
RRR	Alluri Sitarama Raju	Ram Charan
Shabaash Mithu	Mithali Raj	Taapsee Pannu
Mat Kilau	Mat Kilau	Adi Putra
Nayika Devi: The Warrior Queen	Naikiya Devi	Khushi Shah
Medieval	Jan Žižka	Ben Foster
Nika	Nika Turbina	Elizaveta Yankovskaya (older); Vitaliya Korniyenko (young)
Hithumathe Jeewithe	Hithumathe Jeewithe	Dineth de Silva
Il Boemo	Josef Mysliveček	Vojtěch Dyk
Il Boemo	Caterina Gabrielli	Barbara Ronchi
The Silent Twins	June Gibbons	Letitia Wright (older); Leah Mondesir-Simmonds (young)
The Silent Twins	Jennifer Gibbons	Tamara Lawrance (older); Eva-Arianna Baxter (young)
The Dropout	Elizabeth Holmes	Amanda Seyfried
The Dropout	Sunny Balwani	Naveen Andrews
Yorme: The Isko Domagoso Story	Isko Moreno	Raikko Mateo (teen); McCoy de Leon (adult); Xian Lim (older)
Remember Me: The Mahalia Jackson Story	Mahalia Jackson	Ledisi
The Staircase	Michael Peterson	Colin Firth
The Staircase	Kathleen Peterson	Toni Collette
Jerry & Marge Go Large	Jerry Selbee	Bryan Cranston
Jerry & Marge Go Large	Marge Selbee	Annette Bening
Dreamin' Wild	Donnie Emerson	Casey Affleck (older); Noah Jupe (young)
Dreamin' Wild	Joe Emerson	Walton Goggins (older); Jack Dylan Grazer (young)
The Walk-In	Matthew F. Collins	Stephen Graham
Autumn Girl	Kalina Jędrusik	Maria Dębska
Women of the Movement	Mamie Till	Adrienne Warren
Samrat Prithviraj	Prithviraj Chauhan	Akshay Kumar
Rocketry	Nambi Narayanan	R. Madhavan
Caravaggio's Shadow	Caravaggio	Riccardo Scamarcio
Rogue Agent	Robert Hendy-Freegard	James Norton
The Conversation	Josip Broz Tito	Caspar Phillipson
The Conversation	Aloysius Stepinac	Dylan Turner
Hero	An Jung-geun	Jung Sung-hwa
Tchaikovsky's Wife	Antonina Miliukova	Alyona Mikhaylova
Tchaikovsky's Wife	Pyotr Ilyich Tchaikovsky	Odin Biron
The Girl from Plainville	Michelle Carter	Elle Fanning
The Girl from Plainville	Conrad Roy	Colton Ryan
Mister Knockout	Valeri Popenchenko	Viktor Khorinyak (older); Oleg Chugunov (teen); Andrey Titchenko (young)
Joe vs. Carole	Joe Exotic	John Cameron Mitchell
Joe vs. Carole	Carole Baskin	Kate McKinnon
Reign Supreme	Kool Shen	Anthony Bajon
Reign Supreme	JoeyStarr	Melvin Boomer
Reign Supreme	Dee Nasty	Andranic Manet
Reign Supreme	DJ S	Victor Bonnel
Reign Supreme	LadyV	Laïka Blanc-Francard
The Dreamer – Becoming Karen Blixen	Karen Blixen	Connie Nielsen
Devotion	Jesse Brown	Jonathan Majors
Devotion	Tom Hudner	Glen Powell
Becoming Elizabeth	Elizabeth Tudor	Alicia von Rittberg
The Royal	Willie Aikens	Amin Joseph (older); Dallas Dupree Young (young)
The Passport Forger	Cioma Schönhaus	Louis Hofmann
Ponniyin Selvan: I	Aditya Chola II	Vikram
Notre-Dame on Fire	Jean-Marie Gontier	Samuel Labarthe
Julia	Julia Child	Sarah Lancashire
Julia	Paul Child	David Hyde Pierce
Julia	Avis DeVoto	Bebe Neuwirth
Julia	Russell Morash	Fran Kranz
Julia	Judith Jones	Fiona Glascott
El Rey, Vicente Fernández	Vicente Fernández	Jaime Camil (older), Sebastian Dante (adult); Sebastian García (teen), Kaled Acab (young)
The Fight for Justice: Paolo Guerrero	Paolo Guerrero	Nico Ponce
O Rei da TV	Silvio Santos	José Rubens Chachá (older); Mariano Mattos (young)
Santa Evita	Eva Perón	Natalia Oreiro
Johnny	Jan Kaczkowski	Dawid Ogrodnik
Rocketry: The Nambi Effect	Nambi Narayanan	R. Madhavan
This England	Boris Johnson	Kenneth Branagh
This England	Carrie Johnson	Ophelia Lovibond
Till	Mamie Till-Mobley	Danielle Deadwyler
The Swimmers	Yusra Mardini	Nathalie Issa
The Swimmers	Sarah Mardini	Manal Issa
Argentina, 1985	Julio César Strassera	Ricardo Darín
Argentina, 1985	Luis Moreno Ocampo	Juan Pedro Lanzani
The Playlist	Daniel Ek	Edvin Endre
The Playlist	Martin Lorentzon	Christian Hillborg
The Playlist	Andreas Ehn	Joel Lützow
The Playlist	Petra Hansson	Gizem Erdogan
The Playlist	Per Sundin	Ulf Stenberg
The Playlist	Bobbi Thomasson	Janice Kavander
A Friend of the Family	Robert Berchtold	Jake Lacy
A Friend of the Family	Jan Broberg	Mckenna Grace (teen); Hendrix Yancey (young)
A Friend of the Family	Mary Ann Broberg	Anna Paquin
A Friend of the Family	Bob Broberg	Colin Hanks
A Friend of the Family	Gail Berchtold	Lio Tipton
Hilma	Hilma af Klint	Lena Olin (older); Tora Hallström (young)
Marie Antoinette	Marie Antoinette	Emilia Schüle
Thirteen Lives	Rick Stanton	Viggo Mortensen
Thirteen Lives	John Volanthen	Colin Farrell
Thirteen Lives	Richard Harris	Joel Edgerton
Broad Peak	Maciej Berbeka	Ireneusz Czop
My Son Hunter	Hunter Biden	Laurence Fox
Bandit	Gilbert Galvan	Josh Duhamel
Hero of Nation Chandra Shekhar Azad	Chandra Shekhar Azad	Ahmad Kabir Shadan
She Said	Jodi Kantor	Zoe Kazan
She Said	Megan Twohey	Carey Mulligan
Welcome to Chippendales	Somen "Steve" Banerjee	Kumail Nanjiani
Gaslit	Martha Mitchell	Julia Roberts
Gaslit	John N. Mitchell	Sean Penn
Gaslit	John Dean	Dan Stevens
Gaslit	Mo Dean	Betty Gilpin
Gaslit	G. Gordon Liddy	Shea Whigham
Gaslit	Marty Mitchell	Darby Camp
Prizefighter: The Life of Jem Belcher	James Belcher	Matt Hookings
Padre Pio	Padre Pio	Shia LaBeouf
Chevalier	Chevalier de Saint-Georges	Kelvin Harrison Jr.
Corsage	Empress Elisabeth of Austria	Vicky Krieps
The Final Game	Manuel Estiarte	Álvaro Cervantes
The Final Game	Pedro García Aguado	Jaime Lorente
Major	Sandeep Unnikrishnan	Adivi Sesh
Where the Wind Blows	Lui Lok	Aaron Kwok
Where the Wind Blows	Nam Kong	Tony Leung Chiu-wai
American Murderer	Jason Derek Brown	Tom Pelphrey
Rheingold	Giwar Hajabi	Emilio Sakraya (older); Ilyes Moutaoukkil (teen); Baselius Göze (young)
Mike	Mike Tyson	Trevante Rhodes
A Thousand Lines	Juan Romero	Elyas M'Barek
Salute	Fang-Yi Sheu	Fang-Yi Sheu
I Wanna Dance with Somebody	Whitney Houston	Naomi Ackie
Dalíland	Salvador Dalí	Ben Kingsley (older); Ezra Miller (young)
Dalíland	Gala Dalí	Barbara Sukowa (older); Avital Lvova (young)
Spoiler Alert	Michael Ausiello	Jim Parsons
Lord of the Ants	Aldo Braibanti	Luigi Lo Cascio
Faraaz	Faraaz Ayaaz Hossain	Zahan Kapoor
Arvéd	Jiří Arvéd Smíchovský	Michal Kern
A Man of Action	Lucio Urtubia	Juan José Ballesta
Kikka!	Kikka	Sara Melleri
Invisible War	Patryk Vega	Rafał Zawierucha
The Good Maharaja	Digvijaysinhji Ranjitsinhji Jadeja	Sanjay Dutt
The Good Nurse	Amy Loughren	Jessica Chastain
The Good Nurse	Charles Cullen	Eddie Redmayne
Weird: The Al Yankovic Story	"Weird Al" Yankovic	Daniel Radcliffe (older); David Bloom (teen); Richard Aaron Anderson (young)
Emancipation	Peter	Will Smith
Five Days at Memorial	Dr. Anna Pou	Vera Farmiga
George & Tammy	Tammy Wynette	Jessica Chastain
George & Tammy	George Jones	Michael Shannon
Pathonpatham Noottandu	Arattupuzha Velayudha Panicker	Siju Wilson
The Time of Secrets	Marcel Pagnol	Léo Campion (young); Marc Barbé (older)
Emily	Emily Brontë	Emma Mackey
Lamborghini	Ferruccio Lamborghini	Frank Grillo
Simone Veil, A Woman of the Century	Simone Veil	Elsa Zylberstein
The Greatest Beer Run Ever	Chick Donohue	Zac Efron

== 2023 ==
Film	Subject(s)	Portrayed by
Noryang: Deadly Sea	Yi Sun-sin	Kim Yoon-seok
Stonehouse	John Stonehouse	Matthew Macfadyen
Dog Gone	John Marshall	Rob Lowe
Dog Gone	Fielding Marshall	Johnny Berchtold
Color of Victory	Mustafa Kemal Atatürk	Yiğit Özşener
Color of Victory	İsmet İnönü	Bedir Bedir
Color of Victory	Mehmet Sabri Toprak	Nejat İşler
Color of Victory	Galip Kulaksızoğlu	Kubilay Aka
Color of Victory	Topkapılı Cambaz Mehmet	Timuçin Esen
Color of Victory	Halide Edib Adıvar	Birce Akalay
Color of Victory	John G. Bennett	Yılmaz Bayraktar
12th Fail	Manoj Kumar Sharma	Vikrant Massey
Angela	Ângela Diniz	Ísis Valverde
Bank of Dave	David Fishwick	Rory Kinnear
Wildcat	Flannery O'Connor	Maya Hawke
Beyond the Clouds	Zhang Guimei	Hai Qing
Scoop	Jagruti Pathak	Karishma Tanna
Scoop	Imran Siddiqui	Mohammed Zeeshan Ayyub
Scoop	Jaideb Sen	Prosenjit Chatterjee
Scoop	Harshavardhan Shroff	Harman Baweja
Maria Montessori	Maria Montessori	Jasmine Trinca
True Spirit	Jessica Watson	Teagan Croft
Boston Strangler	Loretta McLaughlin	Keira Knightley
Boston Strangler	Jean Cole	Carrie Coon
Sisi & I	Empress Elisabeth of Austria	Susanne Wolff
Sisi & I	Irma Sztáray	Sandra Hüller
Spinning Gold	Neil Bogart	Jeremy Jordan
The Volunteers: To the War	Mao Zedong	Tang Guoqiang
The Volunteers: To the War	Peng Dehuai	Wan Yanhui
The Volunteers: To the War	Zhou Enlai	Liu Jing
Nolly	Noele Gordon	Helena Bonham Carter
Tetris	Henk Rogers	Taron Egerton
Reality	Reality Winner	Sydney Sweeney
Sam Bahadur	Sam Manekshaw	Vicky Kaushal
Hammarskjöld	Dag Hammarskjöld	Mikael Persbrandt (older); Edvin Endre (young)
Sweetwater	Nat "Sweetwater" Clifton	Everett Osborne
Abbé Pierre – A Century of Devotion	Abbé Pierre	Benjamin Lavernhe
Munch	Edvard Munch	Alfred Ekker Strande (young), Mattis Herman Nyquist (adult); Ola G. Furuseth (older), Anne Krigsvoll (elder)
The Boy in the Woods	Maxwell Smart	Jett Klyne
Stolen Baby: The Murder of Heidi Broussard	Magen Fieramusca	Emily Osment
Stolen Baby: The Murder of Heidi Broussard	Heidi Broussard	Anna Hopkins
Love & Death	Candy Montgomery	Elizabeth Olsen
Love & Death	Allan Gore	Jesse Plemons
Love & Death	Pat Montgomery	Patrick Fugit
Love & Death	Betty Gore	Lily Rabe
Love & Death	Don Crowder	Tom Pelphrey
Madame de Sévigné	Marie de Rabutin-Chantal, marquise de Sévigné	Karin Viard
Abdulla Oripov	Abdulla Oripov	Jasurbek Abdumannopov (young); Shodmon Salomov (adult); Kudratillo Burkhonov (older)
Big George Foreman	George Foreman	Khris Davis
A Small Light	Miep Gies	Bel Powley
A Small Light	Otto Frank	Liev Schreiber
A Small Light	Jan Gies	Joe Cole
A Small Light	Edith Frank	Amira Casar
A Small Light	Anne Frank	Billie Boullet
A Small Light	Margot Frank	Ashley Brooke
Mosiah	Marcus Garvey	Samuel Lee Fudge
Miranda's Victim	Patricia "Trish" Weir	Abigail Breslin
White House Plumbers	E. Howard Hunt	Woody Harrelson
White House Plumbers	G. Gordon Liddy	Justin Theroux
BlackBerry	Mike Lazaridis	Jay Baruchel
BlackBerry	Jim Balsillie	Glenn Howerton
Air	Sonny Vaccaro	Matt Damon
Air	Phil Knight	Ben Affleck
Air	Rob Strasser	Jason Bateman
Air	George Raveling	Marlon Wayans
Air	David Falk	Chris Messina
Air	Howard White	Chris Tucker
Air	Deloris Jordan	Viola Davis
Mission Raniganj	Jaswant Singh Gill	Akshay Kumar
Society of the Snow	Survivors of the 1972 Andes flight disaster	Various actors
Y Sŵn	Gwynfor Evans	Rhodri Evan
Y Sŵn	William Whitelaw	Mark Lewis Jones
Y Sŵn	Margaret Thatcher	Sian Reese-Williams
A Million Miles Away	José M. Hernández	Michael Peña
Dumb Money	Keith Gill	Paul Dano
Murat Göğebakan: Kalbim Yaralı	Murat Göğebakan	Burak Sevinç
The Reckoning	Jimmy Savile	Steve Coogan
Jeanne du Barry	Louis XV	Johnny Depp
Jeanne du Barry	Madame du Barry	Maïwenn
Shooting Stars	LeBron James	Marquis Mookie Cook
Shooting Stars	Dru Joyce III	Caleb McLaughlin
Shooting Stars	Dru Joyce II	Wood Harris
Shooting Stars	Willie McGee	Avery Serell Wills Jr.
Shooting Stars	Sian Cotton	Khalil Everage
Shooting Stars	Romeo Travis	Scoot Henderson
Firebrand	Catherine Parr	Alicia Vikander
Firebrand	Henry VIII	Jude Law
Road to Boston	Sohn Kee-chung	Ha Jung-woo
Road to Boston	Suh Yun-bok	Yim Si-wan
Road to Boston	Nam Sung-yong	Bae Seong-woo
The Crowded Room	Danny Sullivan	Tom Holland
Flamin' Hot	Richard Montañez	Jesse Garcia
Oppenheimer	J. Robert Oppenheimer	Cillian Murphy
Sound of Freedom	Tim Ballard	Jim Caviezel
Archie	Cary Grant	Jason Isaacs (older), Calam Lynch (adult); Oaklee Pendergast (teen), Dainton Anderson (young)
Anwar: The Untold Story	Anwar Ibrahim	Farid Kamil
Sight	Dr. Ming Wang	Terry Chen (older); Ben Wang (young)
Sight	Dr. Misha Bartnovsky	Greg Kinnear
Consent	Vanessa Springora	Kim Higelin
Consent	Gabriel Matzneff	Jean-Paul Rouve
Boudica	Boudica	Olga Kurylenko
The Teacher Who Promised the Sea	Antoni Benaiges	Enric Auquer
Demir Kadın: Neslican	Neslican Tay	Çağla Irmak
Jokes & Cigarettes	Eugenio	David Verdaguer
Jokes & Cigarettes	Conchita	Carolina Yuste
Golda	Golda Meir	Helen Mirren
Lawmen: Bass Reeves	Bass Reeves	David Oyelowo
Little Girl Blue	Carole Achache	Marion Cotillard
Buya Hamka Vol. 1	Abdul Malik Karim Amrullah	Vino G. Bastian
Lord of the Wind	Fyodor Konyukhov	Fyodor Bondarchuk
The Long Shadow	DCS Dennis Hoban	Toby Jones
The Long Shadow	ACC George Oldfield	David Morrissey
Class Act	Bernard Tapie	Laurent Lafitte
Gran Turismo	Jann Mardenborough	Archie Madekwe
Origin	Isabel Wilkerson	Aunjanue Ellis-Taylor
Freud's Last Session	Sigmund Freud	Anthony Hopkins
Freud's Last Session	C. S. Lewis	Matthew Goode
Scam 2003	Abdul Karim Telgi	Gagan Dev Riar
The Hill	James Hill	Dennis Quaid
The Hill	Rickey Hill	Colin Ford (older); Jesse Berry (young)
Joika	Joy Womack	Talia Ryder
Legends of Sambo	Vasili Oshchepkov	Wolfgang Cerny
Legends of Sambo	Viktor Spiridonov	Dmitry Pavlenko
Legends of Sambo	Anatoly Kharlampiyev	Anton Vohmin
The Featherweight	Willie Pep	James Madio
Ingeborg Bachmann – Journey into the Desert	Ingeborg Bachmann	Vicky Krieps
Pilecki's Report	Witold Pilecki	Przemyslaw Wyszynski
Nyad	Diana Nyad	Annette Bening
Dance First	Samuel Beckett	Gabriel Byrne (older); Fionn O'Shea (young)
Dance First	James Joyce	Aidan Gillen
Mujib: The Making of a Nation	Sheikh Mujibur Rahman	Arifin Shuvoo
Killers of the Flower Moon	Ernest Burkhart	Leonardo DiCaprio
Killers of the Flower Moon	William King Hale	Robert De Niro
Killers of the Flower Moon	Mollie Kyle	Lily Gladstone
Sumo Didi	Hetal Dave	Shriyam Bhagnani
Priscilla	Priscilla Presley	Cailee Spaeny
Rustin	Bayard Rustin	Colman Domingo
Next Goal Wins	Thomas Rongen	Michael Fassbender
First Lady of BMF: The Tonesa Welch Story	Tonesa Welch	Michelle Mitchenor
Maestro	Leonard Bernstein	Bradley Cooper
Maestro	Felicia Montealegre	Carey Mulligan
Napoleon	Napoleon	Joaquin Phoenix
Napoleon	Empress Joséphine	Vanessa Kirby
The Iron Claw	Kevin Von Erich	Zac Efron
The Iron Claw	Fritz Von Erich	Holt McCallany
The Iron Claw	Kerry Von Erich	Jeremy Allen White
The Iron Claw	David Von Erich	Harris Dickinson
The Iron Claw	Mike Von Erich	Stanley Simons
The Iron Claw	Pam Adkisson	Lily James
The Iron Claw	Doris Von Erich	Maura Tierney
The Great Escaper	Bernard Jordan	Michael Caine (older); Will Fletcher (young)
The Great Escaper	Irene Jordan	Glenda Jackson (older); Laura Marcus (young)
Anderson Spider Silva	Anderson Silva	Bruno Vinícius (older); William Nascimento (young)
The Boys in the Boat	Joe Rantz	Callum Turner
Ferrari	Enzo Ferrari	Adam Driver
The Promised Land	Ludvig Kahlen	Mads Mikkelsen
One Life	Nicholas Winton	Anthony Hopkins (older); Johnny Flynn (young)
On a Wing and a Prayer	Doug White	Dennis Quaid
Stella. A Life.	Stella Goldschlag	Paula Beer
Lee	Lee Miller	Kate Winslet
The Law According to Lidia Poët	Lidia Poët	Matilda De Angelis
Ringo: Glory and Death	Oscar Bonavena	Jerónimo Bosia
Nacho	Nacho Vidal	Martiño Rivas
Love After Music	Fito Páez	Iván Hochman (older); Gaspar Offenhenden (young)
Sam: A Saxon	Sam Meffire	Malick Bauer (older); Elyas Eldridge (young)
Untameable	Ángel Cristo	Jaime Lorente
Untameable	Bárbara Rey	Belén Cuesta
Girl You Know It's True	Fabrice Morvan	Elan Ben Ali
Girl You Know It's True	Robert Pilatus	Tijan Njie
Girl You Know It's True	Frank Farian	Matthias Schweighöfer
Atatürk	Mustafa Kemal Atatürk	Aras Bulut İynemli (older); Emre Mete Sönmez (young)

== 2024 ==
Film	Subject(s)	Portrayed by
Amar Singh Chamkila	Amar Singh Chamkila	Diljit Dosanjh
Amar Singh Chamkila	Amarjot Kaur	Parineeti Chopra
McVeigh	Timothy McVeigh	Alfie Allen
Race for Glory: Audi vs. Lancia	Roland Gumpert	Daniel Brühl
Race for Glory: Audi vs. Lancia	Cesare Fiorio	Riccardo Scamarcio
Race for Glory: Audi vs. Lancia	Walter Röhrl	Volker Bruch
Calamity Jane	Calamity Jane	Emily Bett Rickards
Calamity Jane	Wild Bill Hickok	Stephen Amell
Main Atal Hoon	Atal Bihari Vajpayee	Pankaj Tripathi
From Hilde, with Love	Hilde Coppi	Liv Lisa Fries
From Hilde, with Love	Hans Coppi	Johannes Hegemann
Being Maria	Maria Schneider	Anamaria Vartolomei
Cristóbal Balenciaga	Cristóbal Balenciaga	Alberto San Juan
Harbin	An Jung-geun	Hyun Bin
Limonov: The Ballad	Eduard Limonov	Ben Whishaw
Ae Watan Mere Watan	Usha Mehta	Sara Ali Khan
Faith of Angels	John Skinner	J. Michael Finley
Faith of Angels	Stan Proctor	Cameron Arnett
Faith of Angels	Josh Dennis	Michael Bradford
Griselda	Griselda Blanco	Sofía Vergara
The Asunta Case	Rosario Porto	Candela Peña
The Asunta Case	Alfonso Basterra	Tristán Ulloa
Maria	Maria Callas	Angelina Jolie (older); Aggelina Papadopoulou (young)
Srikanth	Srikanth Bolla	Rajkummar Rao
William Tell	William Tell	Claes Bang
Niki	Niki de Saint Phalle	Charlotte Le Bon
Amaran	Mukund Varadarajan	Sivakarthikeyan
The Red Virgin	Aurora Rodríguez Carballeira	Najwa Nimri
The Red Virgin	Hildegart Rodríguez Carballeira	Alba Planas
I'm Still Here	Eunice Paiva	Fernanda Torres (young); Fernanda Montenegro (older)
I'm Still Here	Rubens Paiva	Selton Mello
Idol: The April Boy Regino Story	April Boy Regino	John Arcenas
Boléro	Maurice Ravel	Raphaël Personnaz
Feud: Capote vs. The Swans	Babe Paley	Naomi Watts
Feud: Capote vs. The Swans	Slim Keith	Diane Lane
Feud: Capote vs. The Swans	C. Z. Guest	Chloë Sevigny
Feud: Capote vs. The Swans	Lee Radziwill	Calista Flockhart
Feud: Capote vs. The Swans	Ann Woodward	Demi Moore
Feud: Capote vs. The Swans	Joanne Carson	Molly Ringwald
Feud: Capote vs. The Swans	Truman Capote	Tom Hollander
Feud: Capote vs. The Swans	Bill Paley	Treat Williams
Feud: Capote vs. The Swans	Jack Dunphy	Joe Mantello
Feud: Capote vs. The Swans	John O'Shea	Russell Tovey
Unstoppable	Anthony Robles	Jharrel Jerome
Bosco	Quawntay Adams	Aubrey Joseph
Rob Peace	Robert Peace	Jay Will
Disco, Ibiza, Locomía	Xavier Font	Jaime Lorente
Tears of Cem Karaca	Cem Karaca	İsmail Hacıoğlu
Komandir	Gennady Zaytsev	Kirill Zaytsev
Komandir	Stepan Khachiyants	Artyom Tkachenko
Komandir	Viktor Chebrikov	Valery Barinov
The Inheritance of Flora	Flora Tristan	Paloma Yerovi
Saint-Exupéry	Antoine de Saint-Exupéry	Louis Garrel
Cabrini	Frances Xavier Cabrini	Cristiana Dell'Anna
The Shamrock Spitfire	Brendan "Paddy" Finucane	Shane O'Regan (older); Jake Hayes (young)
Hayatla Barış	Hayatla Barış	Taner Ölmez
Dabaru	Surya Shekhar Ganguly	Arghya Basu Roy (teen); Samadarshi Sarkar (young)
See You in Another Life	Gabriel "Baby" Montoya Vidal	Roberto Gutiérrez (teen); Quim Ávila (adult)
House of Ga'a	Bashorun Gaha	Femi Branch
The New Look	Christian Dior	Ben Mendelsohn
The New Look	Coco Chanel	Juliette Binoche
The New Look	Catherine Dior	Maisie Williams
The New Look	Lucien Lelong	John Malkovich
The New Look	Hans Von Dincklage	Claes Bang
The New Look	Madame Zehnacker	Zabou Breitman
The New Look	Heinrich Himmler	Thure Lindhardt
Marco, the Invented Truth	Enric Marco	Eduard Fernández
A Republic Song	Ahmet Adnan Saygun	Salih Bademci
A Republic Song	Mustafa Kemal Atatürk	Ertan Saban
A Republic Song	Münir Hayri Egeli	Ahmet Rıfat Şungar
Audrey's Children	Audrey Evans	Natalie Dormer
Joy	Patrick Steptoe	Bill Nighy
Joy	Jean Purdy	Thomasin McKenzie
Joy	Robert Edwards	James Norton
Monsieur Aznavour	Charles Aznavour	Tahar Rahim
The Great Ambition	Enrico Berlinguer	Elio Germano
I Am Nevenka	Nevenka Fernández	Mireia Oriol
I Am Nevenka	Ismael Álvarez	Urko Olazabal
Clipped	Doc Rivers	Laurence Fishburne
Clipped	Donald Sterling	Ed O'Neill
The Ice Cream Man	Ernst Cahn	Noah Emmerich
The Ice Cream Man	Klaus Barbie	Nik Pajic
Silvio	Silvio Santos	Rodrigo Faro (older); Vinícius Ricci (teen); Felipe Castro (young)
The Apprentice	Donald Trump	Sebastian Stan
The Apprentice	Roy Cohn	Jeremy Strong
The Apprentice	Fred Trump	Martin Donovan
The Apprentice	Ivana Trump	Maria Bakalova
The Deliverance	Ebony Jackson	Andra Day
Sleeping with a Tiger	Maria Lassnig	Birgit Minichmayr
Taghiyev: Oil	Zeynalabdin Taghiyev	Parviz Mammadrzayev (adult); Gurban Ismailov (older)
Waltzing with Brando	Marlon Brando	Billy Zane
Waltzing with Brando	Bernard Judge	Jon Heder
Putin	Vladimir Putin	Sławomir Sobala
The Swedish Torpedo	Sally Bauer	Josefin Neldén
Maharaj	Karsandas Mulji	Junaid Khan
Sangharsh Yoddha Manoj Jarange Patil	Manoj Jarange	Rohan Patil
Bob Marley: One Love	Bob Marley	Kingsley Ben-Adir
Gold	Cheah Liek Hou	Jack Tan
Supersex	Rocco Siffredi	Alessandro Borghi (older); Saul Nanni (young)
Vindication Swim	Mercedes Gleitze	Kirsten Callaghan
Holy Mother	Emma	Daniela Brown
Freedom	Bruno Sulak	Lucas Bravo
Fedya. Narodnyy futbolist	Fyodor Cherenkov	Stas Rumyantsev (older); Dmitry Kalikhov (young)
Padu	Kalaimathi Rajintiran	Thanuja Ananthan
Quisling: The Final Days	Vidkun Quisling	Gard B. Eidsvold
Gundi: Legend of Love	Georgi Asparuhov	Pavel Ivanov
Bonhoeffer	Dietrich Bonhoeffer	Jonas Dassler
Nr. 24	Gunnar Sønsteby	Sjur Vatne Brean (young); Erik Hivju (older)
Shirley	Shirley Chisholm	Regina King
Scoop	Emily Maitlis	Gillian Anderson
Scoop	Sam McAlister	Billie Piper
Scoop	Prince Andrew	Rufus Sewell
Back to Black	Amy Winehouse	Marisa Abela
Young Woman and the Sea	Gertrude Ederle	Daisy Ridley
Midas Man	Brian Epstein	Jacob Fortune-Lloyd
So Long, Marianne	Leonard Cohen	Alex Wolff
So Long, Marianne	Marianne Ihlen	Thea Sofie Loch Naess
Lilly	Lilly Ledbetter	Patricia Clarkson
Franklin	Benjamin Franklin	Michael Douglas
Franklin	William Temple Franklin	Noah Jupe
Franklin	Edward Bancroft	Daniel Mays
Franklin	Anne Louise Brillon de Jouy	Ludivine Sagnier
Franklin	Charles Gravier, comte de Vergennes	Thibault de Montalembert
Franklin	Pierre Beaumarchais	Assaad Bouab
Franklin	Gilbert du Motier, Marquis de Lafayette	Théodore Pellerin
Franklin	Paul Wentworth	Tom Hughes
Franklin	Anne-Catherine de Ligniville, Madame Helvétius	Jeanne Balibar
Franklin	John Adams	Eddie Marsan
Reagan	Ronald Reagan	Dennis Quaid (older); David Henrie (adult); Tommy Ragen (young)
Masters of the Air	Gale "Buck" Cleven	Austin Butler
Masters of the Air	John "Bucky" Egan	Callum Turner
Masters of the Air	Harry Crosby	Anthony Boyle
Aaron Hernandez: American Sports Story	Aaron Hernandez	Josh Andrés Rivera
Becoming Karl Lagerfeld	Karl Lagerfeld	Daniel Brühl
Chandu Champion	Murlikant Petkar	Kartik Aaryan
Kemba	Kemba Smith	Nesta Cooper
The Big Cigar	Huey P. Newton	André Holland
The Big Cigar	Gwen Fontaine	Tiffany Boone
The Big Cigar	Bert Schneider	Alessandro Nivola
The Big Cigar	Sydney Clark	Marc Menchaca
The Big Cigar	Stephen Blauner	P. J. Byrne
Mr Bates vs The Post Office	Alan Bates	Toby Jones
Mr Bates vs The Post Office	Jo Hamilton	Monica Dolan
Mr Bates vs The Post Office	Suzanne Sercombe	Julie Hesmondhalgh
Mr Bates vs The Post Office	James Arbuthnot	Alex Jennings
Mr Bates vs The Post Office	Bob Rutherford	Ian Hart
Mr Bates vs The Post Office	Paula Vennells	Lia Williams
Mr Bates vs The Post Office	Lee Castleton	Will Mellor
Swatantrya Veer Savarkar	Vinayak Damodar Savarkar	Randeep Hooda
The 47	Manolo Vital	Eduard Fernández
Aadujeevitham - The Goat life	Najeeb Muhammed	Prithviraj Sukumaran
Beautiful Rebel	Gianna Nannini	Letizia Toni
Modì, Three Days on the Wing of Madness	Amedeo Modigliani	Riccardo Scamarcio
The Fire Inside	Claressa Shields	Ryan Destiny
A Complete Unknown	Bob Dylan	Timothée Chalamet
Queen of the Ring	Mildred Burke	Emily Bett Rickards
Saturday Night	Original Cast of Saturday Night Live	Various actors
Monsters: The Lyle and Erik Menendez Story	Lyle and Erik Menendez	Nicholas Alexander Chavez & Cooper Koch
Piece by Piece	Pharrell Williams	Pharrell Williams
Better Man	Robbie Williams	Robbie Williams
Better Man	Robbie Williams	Jonno Davies
The Correspondent	Peter Greste	Richard Roxburgh

== 2025 ==
Film	Subject(s)	Portrayed by
Quezon	Manuel L. Quezon	Jericho Rosales (older); Benjamin Alves (young)
Magellan	Ferdinand Magellan	Gael García Bernal
Lockerbie: A Search for Truth	Jim Swire	Colin Firth
Emergency	Indira Gandhi	Kangana Ranaut
I Swear	John Davidson	Robert Aramayo (older); Scott Ellis Watson (young)
The Luckiest Man in America	Michael Larson	Paul Walter Hauser
El Sett	Umm Kulthum	Mona Zaki
Hokusai's Daughter	Katsushika Ōi	Masami Nagasawa
Murdaugh: Death in the Family	Alex Murdaugh	Jason Clarke
Murdaugh: Death in the Family	Maggie Murdaugh	Patricia Arquette
Murdaugh: Death in the Family	Paul Murdaugh	Johnny Berchtold
Murdaugh: Death in the Family	Buster Murdaugh	Will Harrison
Murdaugh: Death in the Family	Randolph Murdaugh	Gerald McRaney
Fuori	Goliarda Sapienza	Valeria Golino
Kesari Chapter 2	C. Sankaran Nair	Akshay Kumar
Bhaimon Da	Munin Barua	Bondip Sarma (older); Anurag Bora (young)
Blue Moon	Lorenz Hart	Ethan Hawke
Blue Moon	Richard Rodgers	Andrew Scott
Superstar	María del Mar Cuena Seisdedos	Ingrid García-Jonsson (older); Sofía González (young)
The Match	Cho Hun-hyun	Lee Byung-hun
The Match	Lee Chang-ho	Yoo Ah-in (older); Kim Kang-hoon (young)
Roofman	Jeffrey Manchester	Channing Tatum
I Will Survive: The Gloria Gaynor Story	Gloria Gaynor	Joaquina Kalukango
Devil in Disguise: John Wayne Gacy	John Wayne Gacy	Michael Chernus
Devil in Disguise: John Wayne Gacy	Rafael Tovar	Gabriel Luna
Devil in Disguise: John Wayne Gacy	Joseph R. Kozenczak	James Badge Dale
Devil in Disguise: John Wayne Gacy	Sam Amirante	Michael Angarano
Devil in Disguise: John Wayne Gacy	Bill Kunkle	Chris Sullivan
Devil in Disguise: John Wayne Gacy	Elizabeth Piest	Marin Ireland
The Rapists of Pepsi Paloma	Pepsi Paloma	Rhed Bustamante
The Great Arch	Johan Otto von Spreckelsen	Claes Bang
Happy Face	Keith Hunter Jesperson	Dennis Quaid
Happy Face	Melissa Moore	Annaleigh Ashford
The Testament of Ann Lee	Ann Lee	Amanda Seyfried
Parenostre	Jordi Pujol	Josep Maria Pou
Chief of War	Kaʻiana	Jason Momoa
Springsteen: Deliver Me from Nowhere	Bruce Springsteen	Jeremy Allen White (older); Matthew Anthony Pellicano (young)
Rodnina	Irina Rodnina	Vladislava Samokhina
Rowing for Gold	Yuriy Tyukalov	Gleb Kalyuzhny
Nonnas	Joe Scaravella	Vince Vaughn (older); Theodore Helm (young)
Mr Burton	Richard Burton	Harry Lawtey
Mr Burton	Philip Burton	Toby Jones
Phule	Jyotirao Phule	Pratik Gandhi
Phule	Savitribai Phule	Patralekha
The Illusion	Vincenzo Giordano Orsini	Toni Servillo
Pike River	Anna Osborne	Melanie Lynskey
Pike River	Sonya Rockhouse	Robyn Malcolm
King & Conqueror	Harold Godwinson	James Norton
King & Conqueror	William the Conqueror	Nikolaj Coster-Waldau
The Disappearance of Josef Mengele	Josef Mengele	August Diehl
The Poet	Alexander Sergeevich Pushkin	Yura Borisov (older); Kay Aleks Getts (young)
The Dumpling Queen	Chong Kin-wo	Ma Li
Miss Austen	Cassandra Austen	Keeley Hawes (older); Synnøve Karlsen (young)
Miss Austen	Mary Austen	Jessica Hynes (older); Liv Hill (young)
Primavera	Cecilia	Tecla Insolia
Primavera	Antonio Vivaldi	Michele Riondino
Up Next: Silvio Santos	Silvio Santos	Leandro Hassum
Duse	Eleonora Duse	Valeria Bruni Tedeschi
Ed Kemper	Edmund Kemper	Lew Temple
Death by Lightning	James A. Garfield	Michael Shannon
Death by Lightning	Charles J. Guiteau	Matthew Macfadyen
Death by Lightning	Chester A. Arthur	Nick Offerman
Death by Lightning	Lucretia Garfield	Betty Gilpin
Death by Lightning	James G. Blaine	Bradley Whitford
Death by Lightning	Roscoe Conkling	Shea Whigham
The World Will Tremble	Solomon Wiener	Oliver Jackson-Cohen
The World Will Tremble	Michał Podchlebnik	Jeremy Neumark Jones
Franz	Franz Kafka	Idan Weiss (older); Daniel Dongres (young)
H Is for Hawk	Helen Macdonald	Claire Foy
H Is for Hawk	Alisdair Macdonald	Brendan Gleeson
Ashes, the Movie	Fredy Ortiz	Fredy Ortiz
Soloz: Game of Life	Muhammad "Soloz" Faris Zakaria	Hun Haqeem
The Alto Knights	Vito Genovese	Robert De Niro
The Alto Knights	Frank Costello	Robert De Niro
Binodiini	Binodini Dasi	Rukmini Maitra
Anjila	Anjila Tumbapo Subba	Anjila Tumbapo Subba
Words of War	Anna Politkovskaya	Maxine Peake
Words of War	Dmitry Muratov	Ciarán Hinds
Words of War	Alexander Politkovsky	Jason Isaacs
The Diplomat	J. P. Singh	John Abraham
Can You Feel the Beat: The Lisa Lisa Story	Lisa Velez	Jearnest Corchado
Marcel et Monsieur Pagnol	Marcel Pagnol	Laurent Lafitte (voice)
Marcel et Monsieur Pagnol	Augustine Pagnol	Géraldine Pailhas (voice)
Christy	Christy Martin	Sydney Sweeney
Soul on Fire	John O'Leary	Joel Courtney
Last Days	John Allen Chau	Sky Yang
Chhaava	Chhatrapati Sambhaji Maharaj	Vicky Kaushal
Swiped	Whitney Wolfe Herd	Lily James
Monster: The Ed Gein Story	Ed Gein	Charlie Hunnam
Song Sung Blue	Mike "Lightning" Sardina	Hugh Jackman
Song Sung Blue	Claire "Thunder" Sardina	Kate Hudson
The Smashing Machine	Mark Kerr	Dwayne Johnson
Sarah's Oil	Sarah Rector	Naya Desir-Johnson

== 2026 ==
Film	Subject(s)	Portrayed by
Michael	Michael Jackson	Jaafar Jackson (older); Juliano Valdi (young)
I Play Rocky	Sylvester Stallone	Anthony Ippolito
Madden	John Madden	Nicolas Cage
Young Washington	George Washington	William Franklyn-Miller
Zero A. D.	Mary	Deva Cassel (older); Sophie Sloan (young)
Zero A. D.	Joseph	Jamie Ward
Zero A. D.	Antipater	Sam Worthington
Zero A. D.	Nahash of Ammon	Ben Mendelsohn
Zero A. D.	Joachim	Gael García Bernal
Zero A. D.	Herod the Great	Jim Caviezel
The Way of the Wind	Jesus Christ	Géza Röhrig
The Swedish Connection	Gösta Engzell	Henrik Dorsin
Dark Horse	Jair Bolsonaro	Jim Caviezel
I Can Only Imagine 2	Bart Millard	John Michael Finley
I Can Only Imagine 2	Tim Timmons	Milo Ventimiglia
Fatherland	Thomas Mann	Hanns Zischler
Fatherland	Erika Mann	Sandra Hüller
Jimmy	James Stewart	KJ Apa
Ikkis	Arun Khetarpal	Agastya Nanda
The Yellow Tie	Sergiu Celibidache	John Malkovich (older); Ben Schnetzer (adult); Ewan Horrocks (young)
Raja Shivaji	Chatrapati Shivaji Maharaj	Riteish Deshmukh
Bike Ambulance Dada	Karimul Haque	Dev
The Social Reckoning	Frances Haugen	Mikey Madison
Primetime	Chris Hansen	Robert Pattinson
Hershey	Milton S. Hershey	Finn Wittrock
Hershey	Catherine Hershey	Alexandra Daddario
Ink	Rupert Murdoch	Guy Pearce
Ink	Larry Lamb	Jack O'Connell
Maserati: The Brothers	Alfieri Maserati	Michele Morrone
Maserati: The Brothers	Bindo Maserati	Salvatore Esposito
Maserati: The Brothers	Carlo Maserati	Lorenzo de Moor
Tony	Anthony Bourdain	Dominic Sessa
Elsinore	Ian Charleson	Andrew Scott
November 1963	John Roselli	John Travolta
November 1963	Tony Accardo	Mandy Patinkin
November 1963	Charles Nicoletti	Dermot Mulroney
November 1963	Jack Ruby	Robert Carlyle
November 1963	Lee Harvey Oswald	Jefferson White
Kūkai	Kūkai	Artificial Intelligence
Artificial	Sam Altman	Andrew Garfield

== 2027 ==
Film	Subject(s)	Portrayed by
The Resurrection of the Christ: Part One	Jesus	Jaakko Ohtonen

== 2028 ==
Film	Subject(s)	Portrayed by
The Beatles - A Four-Film Cinematic Event	John Lennon	Harris Dickinson
The Beatles - A Four-Film Cinematic Event	Paul McCartney	Paul Mescal
The Beatles - A Four-Film Cinematic Event	George Harrison	Joseph Quinn
The Beatles - A Four-Film Cinematic Event	Ringo Starr	Barry Keoghan
The Resurrection of the Christ: Part Two	Jesus	Jaakko Ohtonen
Michael 2	Michael Jackson	Jaafar Jackson (older); Juliano Valdi (young)

== TBA ==
Film	Subject(s)	Portrayed by
Veer Murarbaji	Murarbaji Deshpande	Ankit Mohan
My Duchess	Wallis Simpson	Joan Collins
My Duchess	Suzanne Blum	Isabella Rossellini
The Queen of Fashion	Isabella Blow	Andrea Riseborough
The Godmother	Griselda Blanco	Catalina Sandino Moreno (older); Alexa Demie (young)
Bukowski	Charles Bukowski	Josh Peck
Takht	Emperor Shah Jahan	Anil Kapoor
Vivien & the Florist	Vivien Leigh	Carla Gugino
Young Stalin	Joseph Stalin	Cosmo Jarvis
Malvar: Tuloy ang Laban	Miguel Malvar	Manny Pacquiao
Samo Lives	Jean-Michel Basquiat	Kelvin Harrison Jr.
Untitled Mike Thornton biopic film	Michael E. Thornton	Alan Ritchson
The Devil in the White City	H. H. Holmes	Leonardo DiCaprio
The Devil in the White City	Benjamin Pitezel	Keanu Reeves
Walking to Paris	Constantin Brâncuși	Emun Elliott
The Housewife	Hermine Braunsteiner	Naomi Watts
The Housewife	Joseph Lelyveld	Tye Sheridan

== See also ==
- Lists of biographical films
