= Scoop (Indian TV series) =

Indian crime drama television series

- Genre: Crime; Drama
- Created by: Hansal Mehta; Mrunmayee Lagoo Waikul
- Based on: Behind Bars in Byculla: My Days in Prison by Jigna Vora
- Written by: Mrunmayee Lagoo Waikul; Mirat Trivedi; Dialogues: Karan Vyas
- Screenplay by: Anu Singh Choudhary
- Directed by: Hansal Mehta
- Starring: Prosenjit Chatterjee Karishma Tanna; Mohammed Zeeshan Ayyub; Harman Baweja; Tannishtha Chatterjee; Deven Bhojani
- Theme music composer: Achint Thakkar
- Composer: Achint Thakkar
- Country of origin: India
- Original language: Hindi
- No. of seasons: 1
- No. of episodes: 6

Production
- Executive producers: Sarita Patil; Dikssha Jyote Routray
- Cinematography: Pratham Mehta
- Editor: Amitesh Mukherjee
- Running time: 52–71 minutes

Original release
- Network: Netflix
- Release: 2 June 2023 – present

Scoop is a 2023 Indian Hindi-language crime drama television series created and directed by Hansal Mehta and Mrunmayee Lagoo Waikul for Netflix. It stars Karishma Tanna, Mohammed Zeeshan Ayyub and Harman Baweja in lead roles, along with Prosenjit Chatterjee, Neha Mishra, Tannishtha Chatterjee and Deven Bhojani in supporting roles. The series is produced by Sarita Patil and Dikssha Jyote Routray under the banner Matchbox Shots. The series was released on Netflix on 2 June 2023.

The series is based on Jigna Vora's biographical memoir Behind Bars in Byculla: My Days in Prison. It follows the real-life story of Jigna Vora who was accused of the murder of mid-day reporter Jyotirmoy Dey in June 2011.

At the 2023 Filmfare OTT Awards, Scoop received 10 nominations, including Best Director in a Drama Series (Mehta), Best Actress in a Drama Series (Tanna) and Best Supporting Actor in a Drama Series (Baweja and Ayyub), and won 4 awards, including Best Drama Series and Best Actress in a Drama Series (Critics) (Tanna).

== Premise ==
Jagruti Pathak, a prominent crime reporter, is the principal suspect in the terrible slaying of another journalist. She has to defend her innocence as she becomes the focus of attention because everyone thinks she used her contacts in the underworld to kill her competitor.

== Cast ==
- Karishma Tanna as Jagruti Pathak, Senior crime reporter and Deputy Bureau Chief of Eastern Age (based on Jigna Vora)
- Mohammed Zeeshan Ayyub as Imran Siddiqui, Editor-in-Chief of Eastern Age (based on Hussain Zaidi)
- Neha Mishra as Suman
- Prosenjit Chatterjee as Jaideb Sen, Head Of Investigations at News Day (based on Jyotirmoy Dey)
- Harman Baweja as JCP Harshavardhan Shroff (based on Himanshu Roy)
- Tannishtha Chatterjee as Leena Pradhan, Editor-in-chief of Citi Mirror
- Inayat Sood as Deepa Chandra
- Deven Bhojani as Mama, Jagruti's maternal uncle
- Shikha Talsania as Vidya Chaudhary Bisht alias 'Sadhvi Maa'
- Tanmay Dhanania as Pushkar Mohan
- Sanat Vyas as Jagruti's maternal grandfather
- Ira Dubey as Anita Mohan
- Ishitta Arun as Nelly Siddiqui
- Amar Upadhyay as Sumeet
- Ayaz Khan as Brij
- Pubali Sanyal as Shoma Sen, Jaideb Sen's wife
- Pankaj Vishnu
- Ravish Desai as Advocate Bhavesh Desai, Jagruti Pathak's defending lawyer
- Ninad Kamat as Jagmohan Guha
- Aseem Hattangadi as Sandeep Narvekar
- Manasi Rachh as Neha Gupta, Newsreader at India Now Channel
- Danish Sait as Sushant, Newsreader at AB TV Channel
- Pratik Gandhi as Man on Road (Special Appearance)
- Shreya Gupto as Rupali
- Mehul Kajaria as Darshan, Jagruti's ex-husband
- Malhar Thakar as Ajitesh Bhatt, Jagruti's boyfriend
- Tejaswini Kolhapure as Chhaya Gada alias 'Rambha Maa'
- Swaroopa Ghosh as Ushadevi
- Darshan Dave as ATS Chief Ramesh Malik
- Chirag Vohra as ACP Mahanande
- Alekh Sangal
- Jaimini Pathak as Advocate Chintan Vashisht, senior defence lawyer
- Atul Kale as Dalvi Ji, Senior reporter

== Production ==
=== Development and filming ===
The series was first officially announced by Netflix media press release on 8 February 2022. Principal Photography took place on same month of that year.

=== Marketing ===
The series was first unveiled in September 2022 during Netflix global fan event. The official teaser was released by Netflix India YouTube channel on 24 September 2022. The trailer with a release date was announced on 14 May 2023.

== Release ==
The series was released on 2 June 2023 via Netflix.

== Litigation ==
On 2 June 2023, Rajendra Sadashiv Nikalje, popularly known as Chhota Rajan objected over his picture and voice used in the series alleging the infringement of personality rights to the fellow makers. He moved to Bombay High Court to seek removal of the series from the platform. On the same day, HC dismissed his plea. Rajan's attorney, senior advocate Mihir Desai, answered that his client has a copyright on his image that no one else can use when the bench questioned how it could be maintained as a commercial intellectual property rights dispute and stated it should be sent to mediation. The plaintiff was subsequently instructed by the bench to modify the lawsuit properly.

== Reception ==
=== Viewership ===
Scoop rose to the number one spot in Netflix’s top 10 list in India and Bangladesh upon its 2 June debut. The following week, it remained in both countries’ top 10 lists, hanging on to the second highest spot.

=== Critical response ===
The series received positive reviews from critics, who praised its performances, direction and screenplay.

The Hindu wrote "Karishma Tanna and Mohammed Zeeshan Ayyub power this series about the pitfalls of ambition and the price of journalistic grit. The final episodes are a blur of lurid news flashes and ravenous television cameras. “That’s where I want to be,” says Deepa (Inayat Sood), an ambitious trainee reporter and the scariest character of all."

Saibal Chatterjee of NDTV rated 4 stars out of 5 and wrote "Wending its way through its many sub-plots, Scoop stays focussed on the plight of a woman subjected to mud-slinging by her own fraternity and a police force under pressure to crack a particularly vexed case and find a scapegoat."

Deepa Gahlot for Rediff.com praised the series and rated 4 out of 5 stars and wrote "Scoop is a well-shot (Pratham Mehta) and authentic-looking show. A little over a decade has gone by but there have been rapid changes in the look of the city and models of cars and gadgets."

Santanu Das for Hindustan Times called it "one of the best shows of the year" praising the screenplay and wrote "Not a single minute is wasted in the hour-long, 6-episode long series, created by Mehta and Mrunmayee Lagoo Waikul-- diving headlong inside the middle of everyday journalistic hustle: tracking breaking news, connecting with undercover sources, and bringing the report down to the page."

Debiparna Chakraborty from Best of Netflix rated the series 4/5 and wrote "The cast and crew of Scoop deliver a well-written and effectively-performed story, barring a few slip-ups here and there. Ultimately, the series leaves us with more questions than answers, prompting the viewers to think for themselves. Perhaps that is necessary in a world where critical thinking has become as obscure as ethics in journalism."

India Today rated 4/5 stars and wrote "What is absolutely amazing about Scoop is that it doesn’t preach. It refrains from giving a statement, but is more focused on the events that ensued in 2011."

News18 rated 3.5 out of 5 stars and wrote "The actual book written by Jigna Vora only speaks about her life in Byculla jail, but here in this series, the makers have taken a liberty to go a step further and explained the circumstances and situation led to that situation in her life."

Sumit Rajguru from Times Now gave 3.5 stars out of 5 praising the performance and direction stating, "The Hansal Mehta Show could have been edited well, but the 6-episodes of the series are nothing but a delight to watch."

== Soundtrack ==
The theme music and the score for the series was composed by Achint Thakkar. Previously, Thakkar had also collaborated with Hansal Mehta for his biographical series Scam 1992: The Harshad Mehta Story (2020).

== Accolades ==
Year	Award ceremony	Category	Nominee / Work	Result	Ref.
2023	Asia Contents Awards & Global OTT Awards	Best Asian TV Series	Scoop	Won	
2023	Asia Contents Awards & Global OTT Awards	Best Lead Actress	Karishma Tanna	Won	
2023	Bollywood Hungama's OTT India Fest Awards	Best Original Series of The Year	Scoop	Nominated	
2023	Bollywood Hungama's OTT India Fest Awards	Best Series	Scoop	Nominated	
2023	Bollywood Hungama's OTT India Fest Awards	Best Adapted / Non-Original OTT Work	Scoop	Won	
2023	Bollywood Hungama's OTT India Fest Awards	Best Director of The Year - Series	Hansal Mehta	Won	
2023	Bollywood Hungama's OTT India Fest Awards	Best Director	Hansal Mehta	Nominated	
2023	Bollywood Hungama's OTT India Fest Awards	Best Actor - Female Popular	Karishma Tanna	Nominated	
2023	Filmfare OTT Awards	Best Drama Series	Scoop	Won	
2023	Filmfare OTT Awards	Best Director in a Drama Series	Hansal Mehta	Nominated	
2023	Filmfare OTT Awards	Best Actress in a Drama Series	Karishma Tanna	Nominated	
2023	Filmfare OTT Awards	Best Actress in a Drama Series (Critics)	Karishma Tanna	Won	
2023	Filmfare OTT Awards	Best Supporting Actor in a Drama Series	Harman Baweja	Nominated	
2023	Filmfare OTT Awards	Best Supporting Actor in a Drama Series	Mohammed Zeeshan Ayyub	Nominated	
2023	Filmfare OTT Awards	Best Original Dialogue (Series)	Karan Vyas	Won	
2023	Filmfare OTT Awards	Best Adapted Screenplay (Series)	Mrunmayee Lagoo, Mirat Trivedi and Anu Singh Choudhary	Won	
2023	Filmfare OTT Awards	Best Cinematographer (Series)	Pratham Mehta	Nominated	
2023	Filmfare OTT Awards	Best Production Design (Series)	Tanvi Leena Patil	Nominated	
2023	Filmfare OTT Awards	Best Editing (Series)	Amitesh Mukherjee	Nominated	

== See also ==
- List of Netflix India Originals
