= Muslim Women (Protection of Rights on Divorce) Act, 1986 =

Indian federal law

Parliament of India
- Long title: An Act to protect the right of Muslim women who have been divorced by, or have obtained divorce from, their husbands and to provide for matters connected therewith or incidental thereto.
- Citation: Act No. 25 of 1986
- Enacted by: Parliament of India
- Status: In force

The Muslim Women (Protection of Rights on Divorce) Act, 1986, passed by the Parliament of India in 1986, was enacted to protect the rights of Muslim women who have been divorced from their husband and to address related matters. The Act was passed by the Rajiv Gandhi government, which held an absolute majority, to nullify the decision in the Shah Bano case, and effectively diluted the judgement of the Supreme Court.

It is administered by any magistrate of the first class exercising jurisdiction under the Code of Criminal Procedure, 1973. As per the Act, a divorced Muslim woman is entitled to reasonable and fair provision and maintenance from her former husband, to be paid within the period of iddat.

According to the Statement of Objects and Reasons of this Act, if a Muslim divorced woman is unable to support herself after the iddat period–during which she cannot remarry–following the death of her spouse or a divorce, the magistrate is empowered to make order maintenance payments from her relatives who would be entitled to inherit her property under Muslim law. However, if a divorced woman has no such relatives, and lacks the means to support herself, the magistrate may order the State Waqf Board to pay the maintenance. Thus, the liability of the husband to pay the maintenance was restricted to the period of the iddah only.

== Personal laws ==
High Courts have interpreted "just and fair provision" that a woman is entitled to during her iddat period very broadly to include amounts worth hundreds of thousands of rupees. More recently, the Supreme Court in Danial Latifi v. Union of India read the Act with Articles 14 and 15 of the Constitution of India, which prevent discrimination on the basis of sex, and held that the intention of the framers could not have been to deprive Muslim women of their rights. Further, the Supreme Court construed the statutory provision in such a manner that it does not fall foul of Articles 14 and 15.

The provision in question is Section 3(1)(a) of the Muslim Women (Protection of Rights on Divorce) Act, 1986 which states that "a reasonable and fair provision and maintenance to be made and paid to her within the iddah period by her former husband". The Court held this provision means that reasonable and fair provision and maintenance is not limited for the iddah period (as evidenced by the use of word "within" and not "for"). It extends for the entire life of the divorced wife until she remarries. In Shabana Bano v Imran Khan, the Supreme Court held that a Muslim divorced woman who has no means to maintain herself is entitled to get maintenance from her former husband even after the period of iddah and she can claim the same under S.125 CrPC.

Divorced women are entitled to maintenance from their former husband not only for the iddat period but also to reasonable and fair provisions for future maintenance. S.3 of the Muslim Women (Protection of Rights on Divorce) Act has to be interpreted liberally to assist divorced women. K. Zunaideen v. Ameena Begum (1998) 1 ctc 566.

== Notes ==
The Act is declaratory and retrospective in its operation. Even if the wife is divorced prior to the commencement of the Act, her former husband is liable to provide reasonable and fair provision and maintenance to her. Hyder Khan v. Mehrunnisa(1993)1 APLJ 82 DNC (KER)

== Sources ==
- Lawrence, Bruce B.; Karim, Aisha, eds. (2007). On violence: a reader. Durham [NC]: Duke University Press. ISBN 978-0822390169.
- Aftab, Tahera (2008). Inscribing South Asian Muslim women : an annotated bibliography & research guide ([Online-Ausg.] ed.). Leiden: Brill. ISBN 978-9004158498.
- Samaddar, Ranabir, ed. (2005). The politics of autonomy : Indian experiences (1. publ. ed.). New Delhi: Sage. ISBN 0761934537.
- Noorani, A. G. (2001). The RSS and the BJP : a division of labour (Repr., with updated epilogue. ed.). New Delhi: Left Word. ISBN 8187496134.
- Jindal, T.P. (1995). Ayodhya imbroglio. New Delhi: Ashish Pub. House. ISBN 8170246792.
- Noorani, Abdul Gafoor Abdul Majeed (2003). The Muslims of India : a documentary record. New Delhi [u.a.]: Oxford Univ. Press. ISBN 0195661583.
- Walsh, Judith E. (2006). A brief history of India. New York: Facts on File. ISBN 1438108257.
- Benhabib, Seyla (2002). The claims of culture equality and diversity in the global era. Princeton, NJ: Princeton Univ. Press. ISBN 0691048630.
- Makarand R Paranjape (2009). Altered Destinations: Self, Society, and Nation in India. Anthem Press. ISBN 978-1-84331-797-5.
