= Vijay Shinde =

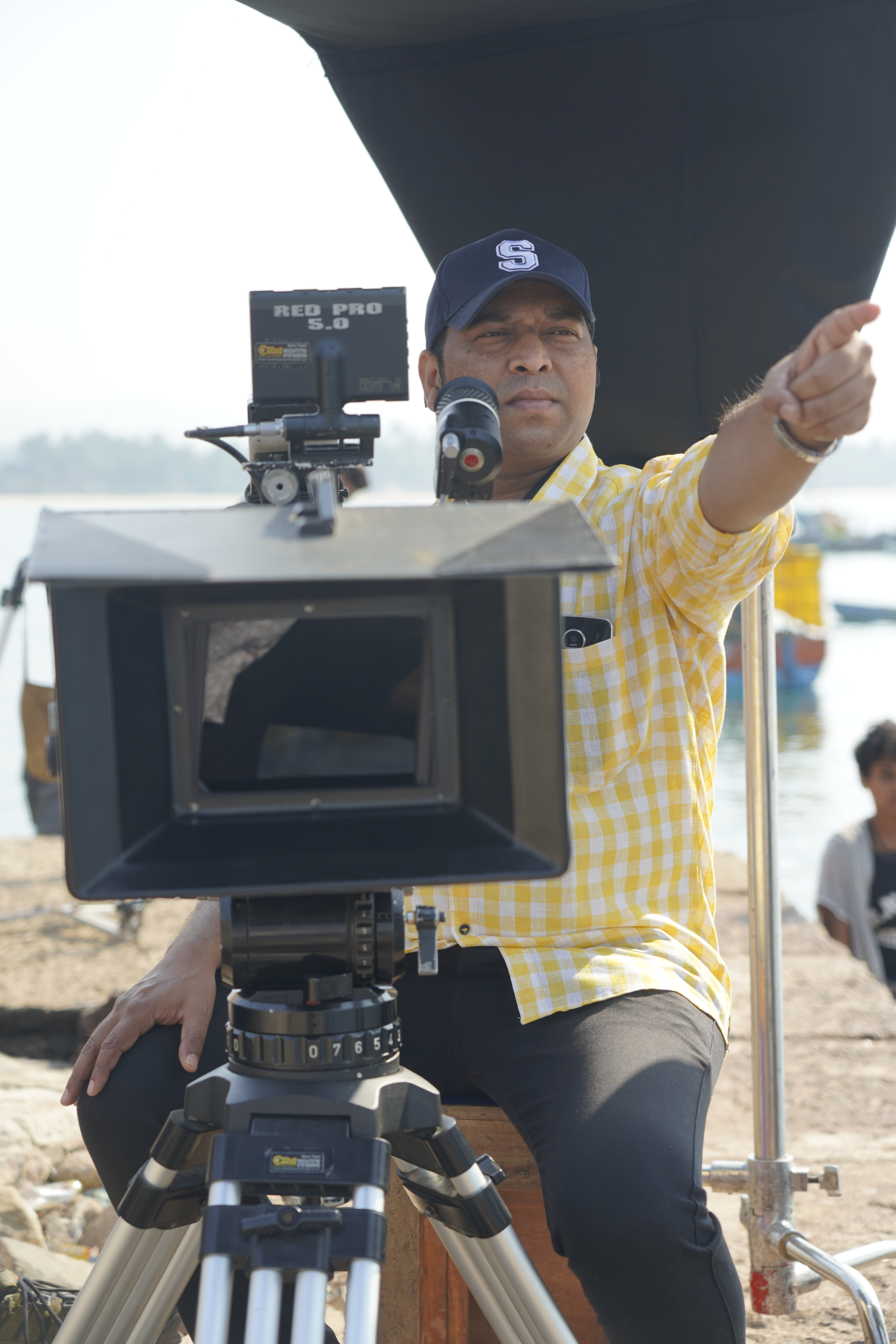
- Vijay Shinde in 2020
- Born: 26 November 1981; Ahmednagar, Maharashtra, India
- Occupations: Screenwriter; Film Director; Editor; Producer
- Years active: 2005–present
- Children: Ilisha Shinde

Vijay Shinde (born on 26 November) is an Indian filmmaker, writer and film director. He has directed several Marathi and Hindi films like Ragging Ek Vikruti (2011), The Strugglers (2012), Veeda Ek Sangharsh (2017), Dostigiri (2018), Shiva (2019), Kalakendra (not released), Abhinav (under production), and Anubhuti (under production).

== Filmography ==
Year	Title	Director	Producer	Writer	Ref.
2011	Ragging Ek Vikruti	Yes	No	Yes	
2012	The Strugglers	Yes	No	Yes	
2017	Veeda ek sangharsh	Yes	No	No	
2018	Dostigiri	Yes	No	No	
2019	Shiva	Yes	No	No	
Unreleased	Kalakendra	Yes	No	Yes	
Unreleased	Abhinav	Yes	No	No	
2023	Anubhuti	Yes	Yes	Yes	
