= Jyotirmoy Dey =

Indian journalist

- Born: 1955; Bombay, Bombay State, India (present-day Mumbai, Maharashtra)
- Died: 11 June 2011 (aged 56); Powai, Mumbai, Maharashtra, India
- Cause of death: Murder
- Other names: Jyotendra Dey; J Dey; Commander J
- Occupation: Journalist
- Employer: Mid-Day

Jyotirmoy Dey (1955– 11 June 2011), also known as Jyotendra Dey, Commander J, and J Dey, was an Indian journalist, crime and investigations editor for Mid-Day (a tabloid newspaper published in several cities in India) and an expert on the Mumbai underworld. He was shot to death by motorcycle-borne sharpshooters on 11 June 2011.

== Career ==
Dey started his career with Hindustan Times. A wildlife enthusiast, he first started writing on forest encroachment and the human-animal conflict in Borivali National Park. A story about government departments taking away land in the reserved national park created a furore in the state legislature.

He started his journalistic career as a freelancer with Afternoon Despatch and Courier writing about crime in the wildlife areas. He also dabbled in photojournalism. He then started freelancing for Mid-Day before joining them full-time. He joined Indian Express in 1996 and soon switched to covering crime stories, especially on the Mumbai underworld. In 2005, he joined Hindustan Times. He later re-joined MiD Day as crime and investigations editor.

Dey had authored two books on underworld activities, Zero Dial: The Dangerous World of Informers and Khallas. He had done many reports on underworld dons Dawood Ibrahim and Chhota Rajan.

== Personal life ==
Dey was born in 1955, in Bombay to Mrs. Bina Dey. He was survived by his mother.

== Death ==
Dey was returning to his home on his motorcycle from Ghatkopar after meeting his mother Bina on 11 June 2011. Around 3 PM of the same day, four unidentified men on motorcycles opened fire on him at Hiranandani Gardens, Powai. He was taken to Powai Hospital, but they did not have the proper facilities to attend to him. Dey was later rushed to Hiranandani hospital. He was reported dead on arrival at the Hiranandani Hospital, with nine exit wounds on his body.

Mumbai Police speculated the murder was a professional job, and may be related to his reporting on the oil mafia. The oil mafia, which pilfers oil being transported and also dilutes it before sale, has been under pressure since the killing of Yashwant Sonawane in January 2011. Dey had also recently reported that Chhota Rajan was the mastermind behind a recent shooting involving Dawood Ibrahim’s brother Iqbal Kaskar in Mumbai.

The murder was widely denounced by the press and the local government.

== Police investigation ==
The investigation of Dey's murder was handed over to the Crime Branch department of Mumbai Police. Media persons from across different sections demanded that the investigations should be handed over to the CBI. Several media persons met the state's chief minister, Prithviraj Chavan, to put forth their demand of handing over the case to the CBI. The chief minister remained adamant that the integrity of Mumbai Police should not be underestimated and the police should be given time to crack the case.

On 27 June 2011, after sixteen days of investigations, the Crime Branch declared they have cracked the case. Police officials caught seven people from different locations of India. Of which three were detained from Chembur, in Mumbai; one in Solapur; and remaining two from Rameshwaram, in Tamil Nadu. All the suspects resided in different parts of Mumbai except Satish Kalia, who settled down in Trivandrum after the birth of his daughter and cases against him were cleared. After the shootout they fled to evade arrest. All the seven suspects Rohit Thangappan Joseph alias Satish Kalia, Arun Dake, Anil Waghmode, Babloo, Sachin Gaikwad, Mangesh Agawane and Chhottu are history-sheeters. The suspects were allegedly from Chhota Rajan's gang "Nana Company". Additional Commissioner of Police (crime) Himanshu Roy, who was supervising the case said in a press conference that Rajan approached Kalia who in turn organised the team to carry the shootout. Kalia was the man who shot Dey, said the police. The commissioner also added the shootout was carried out on the behest of Rajan, and the shooters were allegedly kept in dark about the profession of Dey.

On 21 February 2012, Mumbai Crime Branch chargesheeted journalist Jigna Vora (Deputy Chief of Bureau of Asian Age) under stringent provisions of Maharashtra Control of Organised Crime Act (MCOCA) and various other penal offences for her alleged role in the sensational murder. Besides the stringent provisions of MCOCA and the Arms Act she has also been charged under various sections of IPC including criminal conspiracy, murder and destruction of evidence. Jigna Vora had been under the Mumbai police's radar since 4 July 2011 after the police intercepted a conversation between Manoj, brother of Vinod Asrani, who has also been arrested and the gangster Chhota Rajan. The police alleged that Vora had supplied address and licence plate number of Dey's motorcycle to Chhota Rajan. Police claimed Vora's professional rivalry was the reason for Dey's murder. However, it was argued that the Police did not have a strong evidence to implicate her. On 27 July 2012, Jigna Vora was granted bail by a special court reasoning that she has a child to look after and is a single parent and that she had no previous criminal record. The 2023 TV Series Scoop deals with the story of Jigna Vora, focusing on the events leading to and after Dey's murder, her subsequent arrest and the court room proceedings. Jigna Vora was acquitted in 2018 by a trial court and her acquittal was upheld by Bombay High Court. The court concluded that the Central Bureau of Investigation (CBI) had failed to provide any direct evidence linking Vora to the 2011 killing of Dey.

== See also ==
- Maharashtra Control of Organised Crime Act, an act in Maharashtra to combat organised crime and terrorism.
- Mumbai underworld, a very powerful group of various Criminal organisations like D-Company operating in Mumbai.
- Chhota Rajan, the boss of a major Criminal organisation primarily operating in Mumbai.
