= Rajoshi Vidyarthi =

Indian actor, singer, theatre artist, and former radio jockey

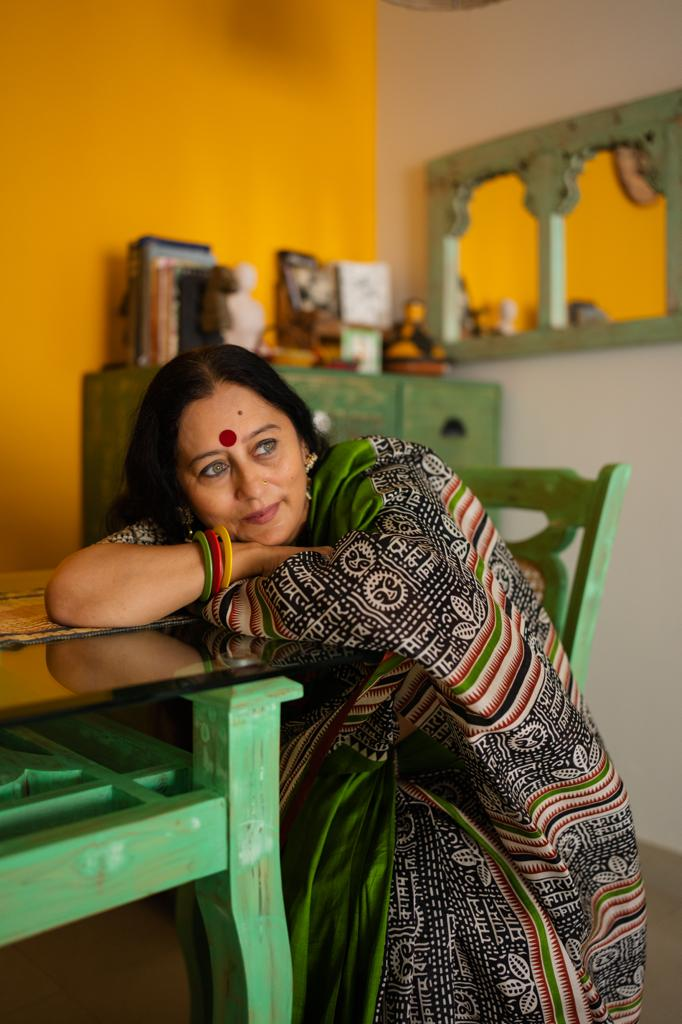
- Rajoshi Vidyarthi in 2023
- Born: 28 August; Kolkata, West Bengal, India
- Other names: Piloo Vidyarthi, Rajoshi Barua
- Occupations: Actor, singer, theatre artist, radio jockey
- Years active: 1993–present
- Known for: Suhani Si Ek Ladki, Imlie, Gud Se Meetha Ishq, Akelli, Vedaa, Mandala Murders

Rajoshi Vidyarthi (also credited as Piloo Vidyarthi and Rajoshi Barua) is an Indian actor, singer, theatre performer and former radio jockey. Active since the early 1990s, she began as one of the early private FM radio presenters with Times FM before moving into theatre, television and cinema. She has acted in Hindi television serials such as Suhani Si Ek Ladki, Imlie and Gud Se Meetha Ishq; films including Akelli and Vedaa; and digital productions such as Guilty Minds and Mandala Murders. Alongside her screen work, she has remained an active theatre artist for over two decades, collaborating with groups like Ekjute and Rangshila. She is the daughter of Bengali actress Shakuntala Barua.

== Early life and education ==
Rajoshi was born on 28 August in Kolkata, West Bengal, into a Bengali household where the performing arts were deeply valued. Her mother, Shakuntala Barua, is a veteran actress in Bengali cinema and television. Growing up in this environment, Rajoshi was exposed to music, theatre and film from a young age. She studied Economics at Jadavpur University, where she actively participated in cultural programmes, stage performances and music societies alongside her academic work.

== Career ==
=== Radio and early professional years ===
Rajoshi entered the media industry in 1993 with Times FM, one of India’s earliest private FM radio stations. She began in Kolkata as a radio jockey, distinguished by a conversational Hindi–Bengali fluency and an engaging presentation style. After relocating to Mumbai, she continued with Times FM as both presenter and producer, curating music-led shows and talk segments. Her tenure lasted around six years, during which she became a recognizable voice in India’s growing FM ecosystem.

After leaving radio, she briefly worked with Times Music in programming and artist development, while conducting music–theatre workshops for children.

=== Theatre ===
Theatre has remained central to Rajoshi’s work. She has collaborated with Nadira Zaheer Babbar’s Ekjute and Avneesh Mishra’s Rangshila in productions that often blend music, history and literature:

- Umrao Jaan Ada – The Musical (2010s–present) – as Ammi (Umrao’s mother); staged in India and abroad.
- The Sun Set in the East (2016–2019) – Rangshila production on cinema pioneer Hiralal Sen; ensemble role.
- Geet Gaan aur Gatha (2016–2018) – musical collage on folk forms; staged at Prithvi and festivals.
- Salaam… 1950s Ke Naam (2018–2024) – Ekjute musical tribute to golden-era Hindi cinema; multiple runs at NCPA Mumbai and tours.
- Ekjute double bill (2009) – credited as music director for two premieres at Prithvi Theatre.
- Roshe Roshe (2023) – contemporary musical by Purva Naresh.

=== Television ===
Rajoshi gained wider recognition as **Pratima Birla** in Suhani Si Ek Ladki (Star Plus, 2014–2017). She later played **Janaki Chaturvedi** in Imlie (Star Plus, 2020–2021) and **Pallavi Bhatt** in Gud Se Meetha Ishq (Star Bharat, 2022).

=== Films ===
Rajoshi debuted with The Body (2019). She portrayed **Beeji** in Akelli (2023) and appeared in supporting roles in Vedaa (2024) and A Wedding Story (2024).

=== Web series and OTT ===
She has appeared as **Mrs. Bose** in Guilty Minds (Amazon Prime Video, 2022); **Kalindi Shastri** in Mandala Murders (Netflix/YRF, 2025); and in Sarzameen (Disney+ Hotstar, 2025).

== Filmography ==
=== Films ===
Year	Title	Role	Language	Ref(s)
2019	The Body	Supporting	Hindi	
2023	Akelli	Beeji	Hindi	
2024	Vedaa	Supporting	Hindi	
2024	A Wedding Story	Supporting	Hindi	

=== Television ===
Years	Title	Role	Network	Ref(s)
2014–2017	Suhani Si Ek Ladki	Pratima Birla	Star Plus	
2020–2021	Imlie	Janaki Chaturvedi	Star Plus	
2022	Gud Se Meetha Ishq	Pallavi Bhatt	Star Bharat	

=== Web/OTT ===
Year	Title	Role	Platform	Ref(s)
2022	Guilty Minds	Mrs. Bose	Amazon Prime Video	
2025	Mandala Murders	Kalindi Shastri	Netflix	
2025	Sarzameen	Supporting	Disney+ Hotstar	

=== Theatre ===
Year(s)	Production	Role	Company / Director	Venue / Notes	Ref(s)
2010s–present	Umrao Jaan Ada – The Musical	Ammi (Umrao’s mother)	Touring production	Staged in India and abroad	
2016–2019	The Sun Set in the East	Ensemble/Actor	Rangshila; dir. Avneesh Mishra	Musical on Hiralal Sen and early cinema	
2016–2018	Geet Gaan aur Gatha	Ensemble/Singer	Rangshila; dir. Avneesh Mishra	Musical collage of folk forms; staged at festivals incl. Prithvi Theatre	
2018–2024	Salaam… 1950s Ke Naam	Cast	Ekjute; dir. Nadira Zaheer Babbar	NCPA Mumbai and touring productions	
2009	Ekjute double bill	Music director	Ekjute	Premieres at Prithvi Theatre; credited for music	
2023	Roshe Roshe (musical)	Performer	Purva Naresh	Musical project reported in press	

== Personal life ==
Rajoshi was married to actor Ashish Vidyarthi, with whom she has a son.

== See also ==
- List of Indian television actors
