= Amir-ud-daula Public Library =

Public library in Lucknow, India

Amir-ud-daula Public Library अमीर-उद-दौला पब्लिक लाइब्रेरी امیر الدولہ پبلک لائبریری
- 26°51′4″N 80°55′52″E
- Location: Lucknow, India
- Type: Public library
- Established: 1868

Collection
- Items collected: Printed works, maps, archives, manuscripts, photographs, lithographs

Access and use
- Access requirements: Library open to all

Other information
- Employees: 19
- Website: amiruddaulapubliclibrary.org

The Amir-ud-daula Public Library (Hindi: अमीर-उद-दौला पब्लिक लाइब्रेरी, Urdu: امر-اد-دلا پبلک لائبریری), is a public library in Lucknow, India.

== History ==
The library has a long history in different locations in Lucknow. In 1868, it was part of the State Museum Lucknow, known then as the Provincial Museum, and open to student readers in 1887. In 1907 the collection moved to the upper storey of the Lal Baradari, a building constructed by Nawab Saadat Ali Khan (1798-1814). In 1910 it shifted to the Chota Chattar Manzil and opened as the Public Library, Lucknow. In 1926 the library moved again, this time to a building constructed for the purpose. The foundation stone was laid by Sir Harcourt Butler in 1921. The library was gifted to the Government of the United Provinces by the Taluqdars of Awadh and named after Mohammad Amir Hasan Khan, one of whose titles was Amir-ud-daula. In 1947, the Taluqdar’s Association transferred some land in front of the Library for the construction of a park

== Collection of books ==
The collection includes about 2 lakh books in languages that include Hindi, English, Urdu, Arabic, Persian, Bengali, and Sanskrit.
