= Jigna Vora =

Indian journalist

- Born: 22 February 1974 (age 52)
- Education: Bachelor's Degree from D.G. Ruparel College, Mumbai Diploma in Mass Communications, K. J. Somaiya Institute of Management Studies and Research, Mumbai
- Occupations: Journalist in 2008 and 2011

Jigna Vora (born 1974) is a former Indian journalist. She was falsely accused of having a connection to the murder of journalist Jyotirmoy Dey and was booked under MCOCA. Her biographical memoir Behind Bars in Byculla: My Days in Prison inspired the 2023 Netflix series Scoop. She practices tarot reading and astrology now. In 2023, she participated in Bigg Boss 17.

== Jyotirmoy Dey murder ==
After the murder of Jyotirmoy Dey on 11 June 2011, Vora was booked under MCOCA and tried among ten other accused including Chhota Rajan. At the time, Vora was working as the deputy chief of bureau of the Mumbai bureau of Indian English newspaper The Asian Age. She was also Anchor of Zee News in 2017.

== Behind Bars in Byculla: My Days in Prison ==
Vora biographical memoir about her journalism career and seven years of trial titled Behind Bars in Byculla: My Days in Prison was published by Penguin India in September 2019.

== In popular culture ==
In 2019, Matchbox Pictures acquired the rights of Vora's Behind Bars in Byculla: My Days in Prison and released the series Scoop on Netflix in 2023.

The 2025 film Haq is based on her book Bano: Bharat Ki Beti.

== Filmography ==
=== Television ===
Year	Title	Role	Notes	Ref.
2023	Bigg Boss 17	Contestant	18th place (Evicted on Day 41)	
