= Himanshu Roy =

Indian police officer (1963–2018)

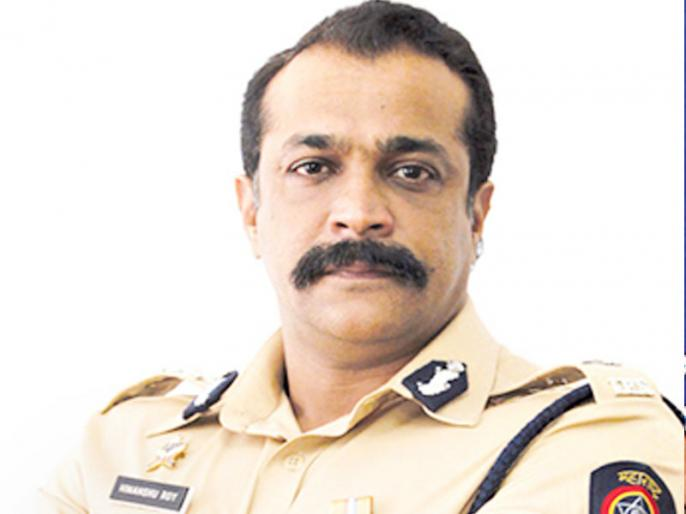

Additional Director General of Police, Maharashtra

Personal details
- Born: 23 June 1963 Mumbai, India
- Died: 11 May 2018 (aged 54) Mumbai, India
- Cause of death: Suicide
- Citizenship: Indian
- Spouse: Bhavna Roy
- Education: Chartered Accountant from The Institute of Chartered Accountants of India St. Xavier's College Mumbai
- Occupation: Law enforcement
- Known for: Additional Director General of Police (DGP), Maharashtra
- Awards: Police Medal for Meritorious Service. 50th Anniversary Independence Medal.
- Website: Mumbai Police

Himanshu Roy (23 June 1963 – 11 May 2018) was an Indian police officer, who served as the Additional Director General of Police (ADGP) of Maharashtra and Joint Commissioner of Police in Mumbai. He was Chief of the Maharashtra Anti-Terrorism Squad (ATS). He was an Indian Police Service (IPS) officer of Maharashtra Cadre of 1988 batch and alumnus of St. Xavier's College, Mumbai. He was awarded the Police Medal for Meritorious Service and 50th Anniversary Independence medal.

During 2013 Indian Premier League spot-fixing and betting case, Roy was responsible for the arrest of Vindu Dara Singh who allegedly had links to bookies in spot fixing.

Roy was involved in the investigations of criminal gangs, such as D-Company and Chhota Rajan's gang. Roy was also part of the investigations into the murder of journalist J Dey (Jyotirmoy Dey) by Chhota Rajan. While investigating the attack on mobster Dawood Ibrahim's brother's driver, Roy commented to reporters about the ATS, "We are keeping a tab on the changing scenario in the underworld."

Roy was also part of the investigations into the serial murders committed by police informer Vijay Palande (alias Karan Sood, Simrin Sud or Simrin Sood); the family murders involving actress Laila Khan; and the murder of lawyer Pallavi Purkhayasta. Hours after Roy's death, the murder case of Meenakshi Thapa that he supervised, resulted in convictions. He was also involved in the Khairlanji Massacre case and post-Babri Masjid demolition riot situation in Malegaon.

== Death ==
On 11 May 2018, at around 12:40pm, Himanshu Roy shot himself at his residence. He was rushed to a hospital but could not be saved. He was reportedly suffering from cancer for a long time. He was diagnosed with cancer in his ankle in 2015, which had spread to his brain, as confirmed by the well-known neurosurgeon, B. K. Misra of Hinduja Hospital, to whom Himanshu sent his reports for diagnosis. He slipped into depression due to incurable cancer. At the time of his death, he had been serving the ADGP (Establishment) Maharashtra post.

Himanshu Roy was a brother-in-law to author Amish Tripathi. Upon media attention of Roy's death, Tripathi issued a statement on behalf of the family:

"There were many among you who reached out to us yesterday to offer condolences at this time of grief. Himanshu had touched so many lives through his sterling career, that there were too many for us to personally respond to. Please take this statement as our thanks to you for your support, kindness and grace."
