= Safed Baradari =

- सफ़ेद बारादरी سفید بارادری
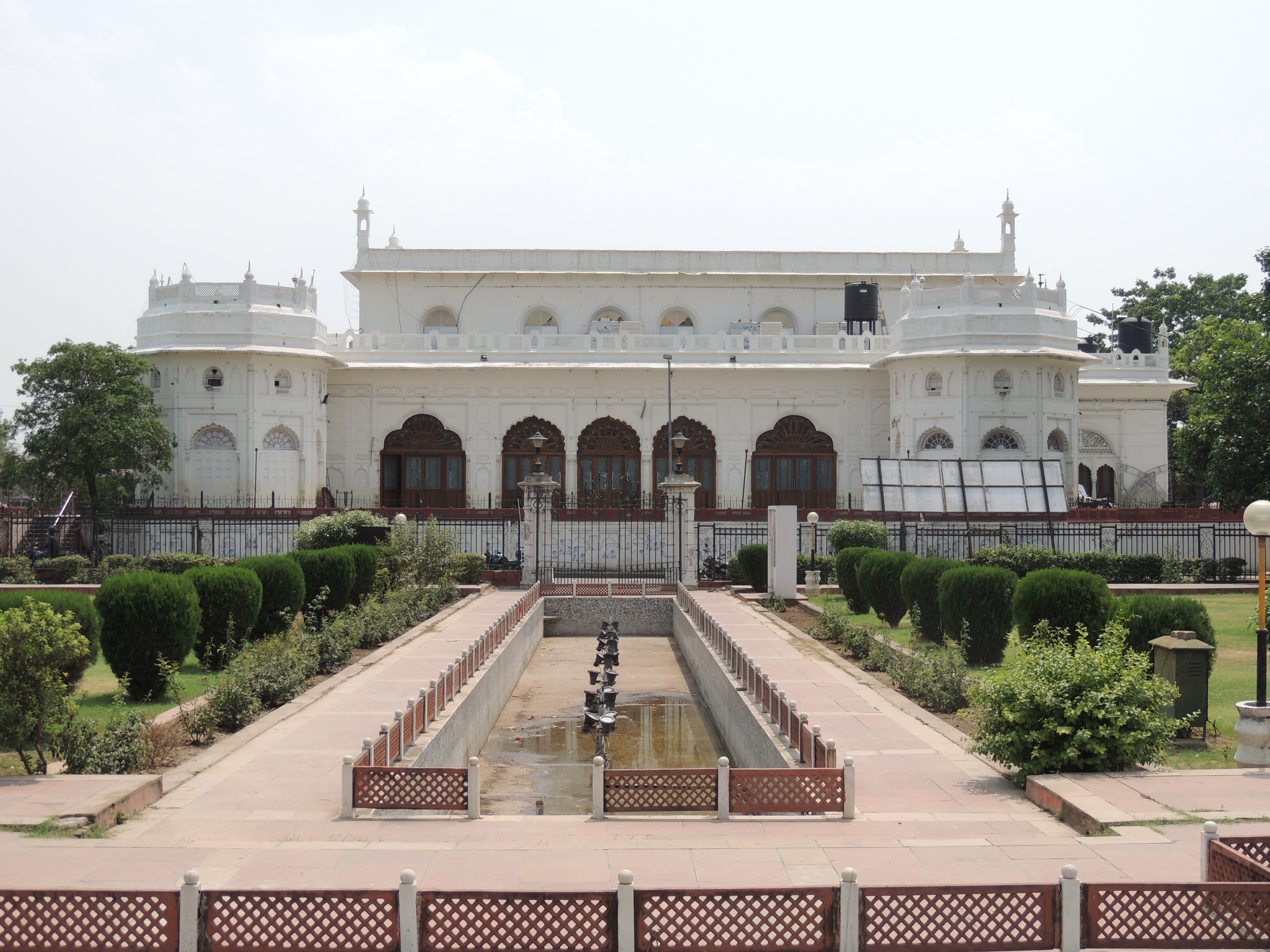
- Alternative names: Qaiser Bagh Baradari

General information
- Location: Qaisar Bagh, Lucknow, India
- Completed: 1854
- Owner: British India Association of Oudh

Technical details
- Floor count: 1

The Safed Baradari (Hindi: सफ़ेद बारादरी, Urdu: سفید بارادری) (literally 'white palace'), is a white marbled building in Lucknow Uttar Pradesh, India.

== History ==
It was built by Raja Arjun Singh Banarasi at the behest of Nawab Wajid Ali Shah as a 'palace of mourning' and was named Qasr-ul-Aza. Initial purpose of this building was to be used as an Imambara for observing 'azadaari' (mourning) for the martyrdom of Imam Hussain and his followers at Karbala.

After the annexation of Awadh in 1856, the Baradari was used by the British to hold court for petitions and claims by the officers and nobles of the deposed King's reign and his relatives. Later (around 1923) it was handed over, as a gesture of appreciation for their submission and loyalty to the Queen of the British Empire, to the Taluqadars of Awadh for their 'Anjuman' (association) which was renamed as the British India Association of Oudh. The Baradari continues to be in their possession and control.

== Interior ==
The main hall of the Baradari has two marble statues of the Maharajas, Man Singh and Digvijay Singh of Balrampur, the founders of the association. The statue of Sir Man Singh was carved by Farmer & Brindley of London, at a cost of £2 000, and was unveiled on 13 August 1902 by Sir James John Digges La Touche, Lieutenant-Governor of the United Provinces of Agra and Oudh.
