= Nyotini =

Coordinates: 26.5500°N 80.2833°E

- Town
- Interactive map of Nyotini
- Country: India
- State: Uttar Pradesh
- District: Unnao

Area
  - Total: 3 km^{2} (1.2 sq mi)

Population (2011)
  - Total: 7,577
  - Density: 2,500/km^{2} (6,500/sq mi)

Languages
  - Official: Hindi, Awadhi
- Time zone: UTC+5:30 (IST)
- Vehicle registration: UP 35
- Website: http://unnao.nic.in/

Nyotini is a town and nagar panchayat in Hasanganj tehsil of Unnao district, Uttar Pradesh, India. Located 3 km southeast of Hasanganj on the right bank of the Sai river, Nyotini was historically one of the main centres of Muslim settlement in the district and it has several mosques and shrines. As of 2011, its population is 7,577, in 1,212 households.

== History ==
Nyotini is traditionally said to have been founded by the Raja Ram, a descendant of Raja Balbhaddar of Jhalotar. Raja Ram was supposedly on a hunting expedition when he came across the spot now occupied by the town, and he was struck by the beauty of the place. He cut away some of the "tin" grass which grew here and founded the town, which he called "Nyotini". His fort was supposedly on the site now occupied by an old dih.

Nyotini was ruled by Raja Ram's family until the time of one Raja Apre, who is said to have mistreated and robbed an influential merchant; the merchant complained to Mahmud of Ghazni, who then sent a force led by Miran Muhammad Zahir-ud-Din "Aftab" to conquer the place. This is associated with a chronogram, "Khuda Dad", which gives the year 614 AH or 1197 CE, which would have been during the reign of Shams-ud-Din Iltutmish. Ever since then, Nyotini has served as a major centre of Muslim settlement in what is now Unnao district.

At the turn of the 20th century, Nyotani was described as having "an air of prosperity". Several members of the local Muslim community held high government posts (one was also a professor of Arabic at Queen's College in Benares) and they had nice houses in the town. The surrounding farmland was "extraordinarily rich and well cultivated", and the main crops were poppies, vegetables, spices, medicinal herbs, and paan. The town, which was in the revenue mauza of Pura Bhar, had an upper primary school, and its population in 1901 was 3,957, including 1,314 Muslims.

Nyotini was first classified as a town for the 1981 census. At that time, its main item of manufacture was listed as cotton cloth.

== Demographics ==
Historical population
Year	Pop.	±%
1981	4,678	—
1991	6,007	+28.4%
2001	7,119	+18.5%
2011	7,577	+6.4%
Source: 2011 Census of India

As of 2001 India census, Nyotini had a population of 7,120. Males constitute 52% of the population and females 48%. Nyotini has an average literacy rate of 43%, lower than the national average of 59.5%: male literacy is 52%, and female literacy is 34%. In Nyotini, 18% of the population is under 6 years of age.

According to the 2011 census, Nyotini has a population of 7,577 people, in 1,212 households. The town's sex ratio is 917 females to every 1000 males; 3,952 of Nyotini's residents are male (52.2%) and 3,625 are female (47.8%). The 0-6 age group makes up about 13.9% of the town's population; among this group, the sex ratio is 916, which is higher than the district urban average of 903. Members of Scheduled Castes make up 27.91% of the town's population, while no members of Scheduled Tribes were recorded. The town's literacy rate was 59.5% (counting only people age 7 and up); literacy was higher among men and boys (67.7%) than among women and girls (50.6%). The scheduled castes literacy rate is 50.8% (60.3% among men and boys, and 40.3% among women and girls).

In terms of employment, 21.1% of Nyotini residents were classified as main workers (i.e. people employed for at least 6 months per year) in 2011. Marginal workers (i.e. people employed for less than 6 months per year) made up 15.9% (the highest proportion in the district), and the remaining 63.0% were non-workers. Employment status varied significantly according to gender, with 57.0% of men being either main or marginal workers, compared to 15.2% of women.

The 2011 census recorded 100.2% of Kursath residents as living in slum conditions. There are 10 slum areas in Nyotini: Dayanand Nagar, Shastri Nagar, Ambedkar Nagar, Adarsh Nagar, Jawahar Nagar, Valmikinagar, Indira Nagar, Gandhi Nagar, Keshav Nagar, and Azad Nagar (the largest). These range in size from 121 to 166 households and have between 2 and 5 tap water access points. The number of flush toilets installed in people's homes ranges from 4 in Valmikinagar to 65 in Indira Nagar. 8 of the 10 areas are served by open sewers, while the remaining 2 (Keshav Nagar and Azad Nagar) have a mix of open and closed drainage.
