= Sankhni =

- Town
- Location in Uttar Pradesh, India Sankhni (India)
- Coordinates: 28.4117278°N 78.136489°E
- Country: India
- State: Uttar Pradesh
- District: Bulandshahr
- Elevation: 207 m (679 ft)

Population
  - Total: >15,000 as per 2,011.

Languages
  - Official: हिन्दी, اردو, English
- Time zone: UTC+5:30 (IST)
- PIN: 202394,203394
- Telephone code: 05732
- Vehicle registration: UP13

Sankhni is a town in Uttar Pradesh, India. It is 3 km from Jahangirabad, and is part of the Delhi NCR region.
