= Always a Bride =

Always a Bride may refer to:

- Always a Bride (1940 film), an American comedy film
- Always a Bride (1953 film), a British comedy film

== See also ==
- Always a Bridesmaid (disambiguation)
