= Javicia Leslie =

American actress (born 1987)

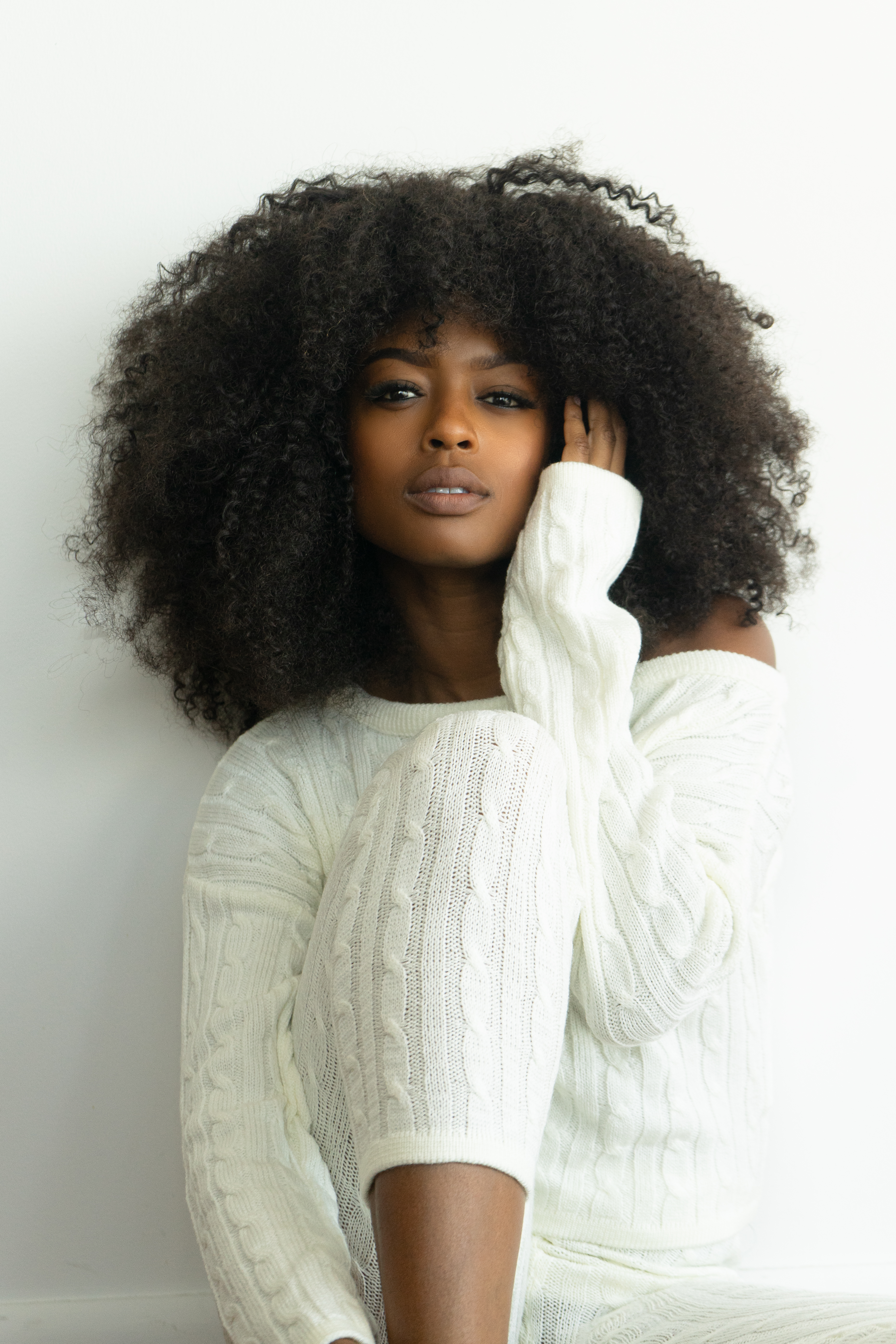
- Leslie in 2019
- Born: May 30, 1987 (age 39); Augsburg, West Germany
- Education: Hampton University
- Occupation: Actress
- Years active: 2010–present
- Spouse: Nana-Yaw Asamoah (m. 2026)
- Website: www.javicia.com

Javicia Leslie (/dʒəˈviːsiə/ jə-VEE-see-ə; born May 30, 1987) is an American actress. After landing her first major role in the Lifetime film Killer Coach (2016), she appeared as a series regular on the BET drama The Family Business (2018–2025) and the CBS comedy-drama God Friended Me (2018–2020). She also starred as the lead of the film Always a Bridesmaid (2019). She played the title role for the last two seasons of the series Batwoman (2021–2022), with five cross-over appearances in the final two seasons of the series The Flash (2021–2023). She currently portrays Detective Daphne Forrester in High Potential (2024–present).

== Early life and education ==
Leslie was born into a military family on May 30, 1987 in Augsburg, West Germany. Her family moved to Maryland where she grew up in Upper Marlboro. She attended Hampton University where she appeared in productions of Seven Guitars, For Colored Girls Who Have Considered Suicide / When the Rainbow Is Enuf, and Chicago. Following her college graduation, Leslie moved to Los Angeles to pursue an acting career.

== Career ==
Leslie appeared in the BET series The Family Business and was cast as a lead role in the 2019 film Always a Bridesmaid. She then appeared as a series regular on God Friended Me from 2018 to 2020, where she portrayed the sister of Brandon Micheal Hall's character.

In 2020, Leslie was cast in the title role of Batwoman following the departure of the first season's actor, Ruby Rose. She plays Ryan Wilder, an original character created for the show, who takes up the mantle of Batwoman for the final two seasons of the series; she also appears, as Wilder and as Wilder's evil Earth-4125 doppelganger who goes by the moniker Red Death, in five episodes of the final two seasons of The Flash. She is currently starring in the ABC crime comedy-drama series High Potential as Detective Daphne Forrester.

== Personal life ==
Leslie is Christian and trained in Muay Thai. In May 2025, Leslie announced that she got engaged to Nana-Yaw Asamoah, an executive at AMB Sports and Entertainment. Leslie married Asamoah at the Banyan Tree Mayakoba in Riviera Maya, Mexico on April 18, 2026.

== Filmography ==
=== Film ===
Year	Title	Role	Notes
2010	MuSicktuation	Kiyoko	Short film
2017	Neva~eh	Princess Omni	Short film
2018	Pas Honteux	Michelle	Short film
2019	Stuck	Ebony	Short film
2019	First Day Back	Linda Jones	Short film
2019	Always a Bridesmaid	Corina James	
2020	Roped	Britney	
2022	We Are Gathered Here Today	Jen Stone-Spitz	
2022	Something from Tiffany's	Sophia	
2023	Double Life	Jo Creuzot	

=== Television ===
Year	Title	Role	Notes
2015–2017	Chef Julian	Monisha	Recurring role
2016	Hello Cupid Reboot	Mo	Main cast
2016	Killer Coach	Samantha Morgan	Television film
2016	Prototype	Waitress	Television film
2017	Broke & Sexy	Monisha	Episode: "Broke & Sexy Finale"
2017	Kat		Web series; main cast
2017–2018	MacGyver	Jesse Colton	2 episodes
2018–2025	The Family Business	Paris Duncan	Main cast (seasons 1-2, 4—5); guest appearance (seasons 3, 6)
2018–2020	God Friended Me	Ali Finer	Main cast
2021–2022	Batwoman	Ryan Wilder / Batwoman	Lead role (seasons 2–3); 31 episodes
2021–2023	The Flash	Ryan Wilder / Batwoman / Red Death	5 episodes
2023	Christmas Detective	Kate Bennett	Television film
2024–present	High Potential	Daphne Forrester	Main cast
