= Fractured (2025 film) =

- Directed by: Mädchen Amick
- Written by: Elissa Shay; Cary Haze
- Produced by: Iris Torres; Penny Edmiston
- Starring: Bruce Dern; Elissa Shay
- Cinematography: Justin Henning
- Edited by: Robin Gonsalves
- Music by: Chad Fischer
- Production company: FutureRetro Productions
- Release date: October 19, 2025 (LA Femme Film Festival)
- Country: United States
- Language: English

Fractured is an American drama film directed by Mädchen Amick, and starring Bruce Dern and Elissa Shay. It is Amick's feature directorial debut. The film premiered at the 2025 LA Femme International Film Festival in October 2025.

== Cast ==
- Bruce Dern as Papa Joe
- Elissa Shay as Hayley
- Julia Ormond as Dr. Rose
- Johnny Ferro
- Anzu Lawson
- Iqbal Theba as Dr. Morris
- Kai Zen as Maya
- Amber Chardae Robinson as Nurse Janet
- Brandilyn Cheah as Young Haley

== Production ==
Principal photography began in Los Angeles in July 2021.
