= Amber Chardae Robinson =

American actress

- Born: Port Arthur, Texas, U.S.
- Education: Prairie View A&M University (B.A.); Columbia University (M.F.A.)
- Occupation: actress

Amber Chardae Robinson is an American actress. Beginning her career in theatre, Robinson performed as a Shakespearean actress in off-Broadway productions with the Classic Stage Company and in productions with California Shakespeare Company and Geffen Playhouse. She made her television debut portraying Mary Fields in Hell on Wheels in 2015 and, in 2019, she made her film debut with roles in Stuber and Always a Bridesmaid. Robinson played Betty Coachman in the 2021 crime drama film Judas and the Black Messiah and Virginia in the 2024 television comedy-drama series Palm Royale.

== Early life and education ==
Robinson was born in Port Arthur, Texas. She graduated from Memorial High School in 2007. Robinson studied theatre at Prairie View A&M University, graduating with a Bachelor of Arts degree in 2012. She earned a master of fine arts degree in acting from Columbia University in 2015. While a student at Columbia, Robinson performed in Oedipus the King and Amphitryon.

== Career ==
As a stage actress, Robinson performed in off-Broadway productions of The Comedy of Errors, Light, Fen, and A Midsummer Night's Dream with the Classic Stage Company. She also performed in the California Shakespeare Company's production of A Midsummer Night's Dream. In 2024, Robinson performed in the play Black Cyprus Bayou with Geffen Playhouse.

In 2021, she played Betty Coachman in the American crime drama film Judas and the Black Messiah. Robinson also made appearances in the films Moving On, 80 for Brady, Stuber, and Always a Bridesmaid.

She acted in the television series Hell on Wheels, So Help Me Todd, Loot, and The Neighborhood. In 2024, Robinson had a main role, starring as Virginia, in the American period comedy-drama series Palm Royale.

She is set to appear in the upcoming film Reminisce.

== Personal life ==
Robinson lives in Los Angeles.

On May 7, 2024, the Port Arthur city council presented Robinson with a key to the city and designated May 7th as Amber Chardae Robinson Day.

== Filmography ==
=== Film ===
Year	Title	Role	Notes
2019	Stuber	Amber	
2019	The Dress	Aralia	short film
2019	Always a Bridemaid	Janelle Devereaux	
2019	If Not Now, When?	Elaine	
2020	Mama Got a Cough	Heather	short film
2021	Judas and the Black Messiah	Betty Coachman	
2022	Moving On	Joie	
2023	80 for Brady	hot wings woman	
TBA	Reminisce	Nurse Janet	

=== Television ===
Year	Title	Role	Notes
2015	Hell on Wheels	Mary Fields	5 episodes
2017	The New Neighborhood	Wanda Wilson	1 episode
2018	The Neighborhood	Whitney	1 episode
2020	Brews Brothers	Jordan	1 episode
2021	Loot	Tanya	4 episodes
2023	So Help Me Todd	Theresa Wallace	1 episode
2024-2026	Palm Royale	Virginia	main role
