= Moving On (2022 film) =

2022 film by Paul Weitz

- Theatrical release poster
- Directed by: Paul Weitz
- Written by: Paul Weitz
- Produced by: Stephanie Meurer; Andrew Miano; Chris Parker; Dylan Sellers; Paul Weitz
- Starring: Lily Tomlin; Jane Fonda; Malcolm McDowell; Sarah Burns; Richard Roundtree
- Cinematography: Tobias Datum
- Edited by: Hilda Rasula
- Music by: Amanda Jones
- Production companies: Boies Schiller Entertainment; Depth of Field; Limelight
- Distributed by: Roadside Attractions
- Release dates: September 13, 2022 (TIFF); March 17, 2023 (United States)
- Running time: 85 minutes
- Country: United States
- Language: English
- Box office: $2.1 million

Moving On is a 2022 American comedy film written and directed by Paul Weitz. The film stars Jane Fonda, Lily Tomlin, Malcolm McDowell, Sarah Burns, and Richard Roundtree.

The film premiered at the Toronto International Film Festival on September 13, 2022.

Claire and Evelyn, estranged former friends, reconnect at the funeral of a mutual friend, and decide to exact revenge on their dead friend's widower for the harm he caused to Claire decades earlier.

Roadside Attractions acquired North American rights to the film, which was released on March 17, 2023. This was Richard Roundtree's final film to be released before his death in October 2023.

== Plot ==
Claire leaves her beloved corgie with her daughter and grandchildren so she can travel across the country to attend the funeral of her old college friend Joyce. Before the funeral service, Claire approaches Joyce's widower Howard, and bluntly informs him that she intends to kill him this weekend.

Directly after the service, Claire reconnects with Evelyn, who had been Joyce's college roommate and lover. It is revealed that Howard had wronged Claire decades ago, although the nature of the wrong is not yet specified. She insists she is going to kill him, now that their friend is gone.

After the two friends are unsuccessful at buying a gun, Evelyn initially refuses to help Claire with her plan to kill Howard at the wake. Instead, she heads to her assisted-living facility.

Meanwhile, at the wake, Claire reconnects with her ex-husband Ralph, whom she has not seen in years. Evelyn shows up, outs Joyce upon revealing their two and a half year relationship in NYC between junior year and beyond, so she and Claire leave together.

That evening, Ralph invites Claire home for dinner, where she meets his daughter and two grandsons. Afterwards, over drinks, he asks her why she left him, and she cannot bring herself to articulate the reason. Still, they have a romantic evening together and make love. However, Claire slips out early in the morning with freshly cooked bacon upon Evelyn's request.

As Evelyn changed her mind about helping to kill Howard, she convinces another resident to loan them his gun by bribing him with the bacon. The gun they want to use to kill Howard turns out to be a flare gun, but she insists it will be lethal at close range.

Under the guise of meeting to apologise in a park, Claire confronts Howard about the assault in a tense scene. She insists he admit to raping her forty-six years previously, while pointing a flare gun—the only kind of gun they've been able to acquire—at him. However, he collapses from what Claire assumes is a heart attack before she can pull the trigger. Instead, she uses the flare to signal that he needs medical help.

In the hospital, it is revealed that Howard actually had a non-life-threatening anxiety attack. Claire goes into his room and describes the assault in detail, but he continues to deny it. So she tries to smother Howard to death with a pillow, but is stopped by Evelyn.

In the end, during a final confrontation between Claire, Evelyn, and Howard in the parking garage at the hospital, Howard fires a shower of expletives at the women. Then he accidentally turns into the path of another driver and dies.

After Howard's funeral, Claire reconnects again with Ralph, as she is now ready to have a potentially ongoing romance with him again.

== Cast ==
- Lily Tomlin as Evelyn
- Jane Fonda as Claire
- Malcolm McDowell as Howard
- Richard Roundtree as Ralph
- Sarah Burns as Allie
- Catherine Dent as Molly
- Mo Zelof as James Hassenpfeffer
- Annie Korzen as Wendy
- Lauren Tom as Ava
- Amber Chardae Robinson as Joie
- Haaz Sleiman as Gun Shop Salesman

== Reception ==
On the review aggregator website Rotten Tomatoes, 75% of 79 critics' reviews are positive, with an average rating of 6.4/10. The website's consensus reads: "Moving On fails frustratingly often to rise to the level of its leads, but Jane Fonda and Lily Tomlin are entertaining company regardless of the context." Metacritic, which uses a weighted average, assigned the film a score of 60 out of 100, based on 18 critics, indicating "mixed or average" reviews.

Peter Debruge of Variety wrote: "We've been spoiled this past decade, discovering what Fonda and Tomlin can do together. Why didn’t Hollywood see the potential of this pairing half a century earlier?"
