= Michelle Mitchenor =

American actress

- Born: Trenton, New Jersey, U.S.
- Occupation: Actress
- Years active: 2014–present
- Spouse: Mustafa Speaks (m. 2018)

Michelle Mitchenor is an American actress. She is known for her roles as Detective Sonya Bailey on the Fox action comedy-drama series, Lethal Weapon (2016–2019), and as Jayla Wright in the BET+ comedy-drama series, First Wives Club (2021–2022).

== Early life ==
Mitchenor was born and raised in Trenton, New Jersey. She attended Ocean County Performing Arts Academy High School in New Jersey to study dancing and acting. Mitchenor attended Towson University, where she graduated Bachelor of Fine Arts for dancing. She later went to Juilliard School and began appearing in web-series.

== Career ==
In 2015, Mitchenor made her big screen debut appearing in the Spike Lee’s musical-drama film, Chi-Raq. The following year, Mitchenor was cast as the regular role as Detective Sonya Bailey in the Fox action comedy-drama series, Lethal Weapon. The series was canceled in 2019. Later in 2019 she went to star in BET Her thriller film, Fanatic, and co-starred in the romantic comedy film, Always a Bridesmaid. In 2021, she was cast in the BET+ comedy-drama series, First Wives Club. In 2023, Mitchenor played Tonesa Welch in the biographical crime drama film, First Lady of BMF: The Tonesa Welch Story.

== Personal life ==
In 2018, Mitchenor married fellow actor, Mustafa Speaks.

== Filmography ==
=== Film ===
Year	Title	Role	Notes
2015	Chi-Raq	Indigo	
2016	Fade Away	Teresa	Short
2019	Fanatic	Zoe	TV movie
2019	Where We Go from Here	Bank Teller	
2019	Always a Bridesmaid	Tamara Mickens	
2019	A Date by Christmas Eve	Simone Scott	TV movie
2020	Augustus	Anna	Short
2021	Day 74	-	Short
2022	Starkeisha	Crystal	Short
2023	First Lady of BMF: The Tonesa Welch Story	Tonesa Welch	

=== Television ===
Year	Title	Role	Notes
2013–2016	Black Boots	Zoe Young	Recurring Cast
2014	Sunday	Monica	Recurring Cast
2014	Sex Sent Me to the ER	Intake Nurse	Episode: "Have a Ball"
2015	Last to Love	Sydney	Main Cast
2015	The Marriage Tour	Kelly	Episode: "Player's Complex"
2016–2019	Lethal Weapon	Detective Sonya Bailey	Main Cast
2017	Tales	Crystal	Episode: "Trap Queen"
2021	BET Her Presents: The Waiting Room	Summer	Episode: "The Party"
2021–2022	First Wives Club	Jayla Wright	Main Cast: Season 2-3

=== Video Game ===
Year	Title	Role	Notes
2015	NBA 2K16	Cee-Cee (voice)	
