= First Lady of BMF: The Tonesa Welch Story =

Biographical film by Vivica A. Fox

- Directed by: Vivica A. Fox
- Written by: Gabrielle Collins; Tressa Azarel Smallwood
- Produced by: Greg Mathis; Donte Lee; Delece James; Tonesa Welch
- Starring: Michelle Mitchenor; Tobias Truvillion; Leon; Jess Hilarious; Kellie Shanygne Williams
- Edited by: Charles Jones
- Music by: Teddy Alexander Bishop
- Production company: MegaMind Media
- Distributed by: BET+
- Release date: October 5, 2023
- Running time: 120 minutes
- Country: United States
- Language: English

First Lady of BMF: The Tonesa Welch Story is an American biographical crime drama film written by Gabrielle Collins and Tressa Azarel Smallwood and directed by Vivica A. Fox, in her directorial debut. The film stars Michelle Mitchenor as Tonesa Welch. The film follows Welch's rise from a teenager mother to a drug dealer in Detroit, referred as "First Lady" of the notorious Black Mafia Family. The film also stars Tobias Truvillion, Leon, Jess Hilarious, Faith Malonte, Tristan Fazekas and Kellie Shanygne Williams, with Welch making a cameo appearance.

The film was released by BET+ on October 5, 2023. At the 55th NAACP Image Awards, First Lady of BMF: The Tonesa Welch Story was nominated for an Outstanding Television Movie, Mini-Series or Dramatic Special and Outstanding Directing in a Television Movie or Special (Fox).

== Cast ==
- Michelle Mitchenor as Tonesa Welch
- Tobias Truvillion as Harvey
- Leon as Emerson
- Jess Hilarious as Lisa
- Kellie Shanygne Williams
- Faith Malonte as Terry Flenory
- Tristan Fazekas as Meech Flenory
- Daphnique Springs as Carla
- Quentin Alexander as Gordon
- D'Andre McKenzie as Corey
- Tonesa Welch as herself

== Production ==
On March 10, 2023, it was reported that BET+ ordered First Lady of BMF: The Tonesa Welch Story, a biopic about Tonesa Welch, directed by Vivica A. Fox and produced by Judge Greg Mathis. On April 27, 2023, it was reported that Michelle Mitchenor, Tobias Truvillion, Leon, Jessica "Jess Hilarious" Moore, Faith Malonte, Kellie Williams, Daphnique Springs and Tristan Fazekas would star in the film. Tonesa Welch made a cameo appearance in the film. Smallwood was also the film's executive producer, and for Fox, First Lady of BMF was her directorial debut. The filming took place in April 2023 in Washington, D.C.
