= God Friended Me =

American fantasy drama series

- Genre: Fantasy; Comedy drama
- Created by: Steven Lilien; Bryan Wynbrandt
- Starring: Brandon Micheal Hall; Violett Beane; Suraj Sharma; Javicia Leslie; Joe Morton; Erica Gimpel
- Composer: Michael Suby
- Country of origin: United States
- Original language: English
- No. of seasons: 2
- No. of episodes: 42

Production
- Executive producers: Steven Lilien; Bryan Wynbrandt; Marcos Siega; Greg Berlanti; Sarah Schechter
- Producer: Joseph Zolfo
- Running time: 42–45 minutes
- Production companies: Berlanti Productions; I Have an Idea! Entertainment; CBS Television Studios; Warner Bros. Television

Original release
- Network: CBS
- Release: September 30, 2018 – April 26, 2020

God Friended Me is an American comedy-drama television series created by Steven Lilien and Bryan Wynbrandt. It stars Brandon Micheal Hall, Violett Beane, Suraj Sharma, Javicia Leslie, Joe Morton and Erica Gimpel. The series was ordered on May 11, 2018 and premiered on September 30, 2018, and concluded with a two-hour series finale on April 26, 2020, on CBS. CBS renewed the series for a second season which premiered on September 29, 2019. In March 2020, season 2 filming was suspended due to the COVID-19 pandemic. In April 2020, the series was canceled after two seasons.

== Plot ==
The series chronicles the life of Miles Finer (Hall), an outspoken atheist and podcaster, who is sent a friend request on Facebook by an account named "God". This account suggests new friends to Miles, people in his hometown of New York City, who will require assistance. Initially skeptical, Miles decides to follow these suggestions to help people. His first suggestion is a doctor who lost a patient and is on the verge of losing his girlfriend. While following up on his second suggestion, he meets and befriends Cara (Beane), a struggling magazine writer. Together with Cara and his hacker friend Rakesh (Sharma), Miles tries to find out who is behind the "God" account while still providing help to the account's continuing friend suggestions. Miles' atheist views sometimes cause friction with his father (Morton), who is the pastor of an Episcopal church in Harlem.

== Use of Facebook ==
God Friended Me uses Facebook frequently as a narrative device. The "Friended" in the title God Friended Me refers to the act of friending someone on social media, granting that person special privileges (on the service in question) with respect to oneself. In God Friended Me, this allows for God to contact Miles.

While the majority of Facebook's revenue is advertisement-derived, show creator Steven Lilien says that their conversations with Facebook have been limited to discussing "how much we can portray it." The "God" of the show was active on Facebook outside the show, with liking pages and changing their profile picture as examples of their online activities.

== Cast ==
=== Main ===
- Brandon Micheal Hall as Miles Finer, a skeptical atheist who hosts a podcast about his atheism. Miles’ life is thrown into chaos when he is friended by an account named "God" on Facebook, which then sends him friend suggestions. This sends him on journeys to change people's lives.
- Violett Beane as Cara Bloom, a journalist who is Miles' second friend suggestion. She becomes friends with Miles and Rakesh, helping them with God account cases. She and Miles start a romantic relationship, which is tested when a God account case comes between them.
- Suraj Sharma as Rakesh Singh, a hacker and friend of Miles
- Joe Morton as Arthur Finer, Miles' father who is the long-time pastor of Harlem Episcopal church and later the Bishop of New York
- Javicia Leslie as Ali Finer, Miles' sister and Arthur's daughter
- Erica Gimpel as Trish Allen, Arthur's girlfriend and then wife (season 2; recurring season 1)

=== Recurring ===
- Parminder Nagra as Pria Amar, a university associate of Henry Chase and Simon Hayes. Simon was her bone marrow donor when she had her first leukemia.
- Rachel Bay Jones as Susan, Cara's estranged mother with whom she reconnects.
- Shazi Raja as Jaya, Rakesh's girlfriend, later ex-girlfriend, then later wife.
- Francesca Ling as Parker
- Malik Yoba as Terrance, Arthur's brother-in-law and Miles and Ali's maternal uncle.
- Brent Sexton as Ray Nicolette, Miles' fourth friend suggestion. A widowed private investigator who takes in a foster child named Isaac after finding that his late wife shared a connection with him. He uses his investigative skills to help Miles with a few subsequent friend suggestions.
- Kyle Harris as Eli, Cara's boyfriend in the first season.
- Victoria Janicki as Nia, Miles' girlfriend in the first season.
- Gaius Charles as Rev. Andrew Carver, one of Arthur's associates at Harlem Episcopal.
- Adam Goldberg as Simon Hayes, a tech billionaire who was thought to be behind the God account due to his work in predictive analytics.
- Michel Gill as Wilson Hedges
- Derek Luke as Henry Chase, who built Juliette Code which was the base code for the flood-warning system Simon Hayes developed.
- Jessica Lu as Constance "Joy" Chen (guest season 1, recurring season 2), a lawyer who is friended by the God account at the end of season 1. She was suggested by God to befriend Miles in season 2.
- Zach Appelman as Lt. Fremont; later Captain Fremont (season 2)
- Susan Misner as Annie Keller (season 2)
- Karine Vanasse as Audrey Grenelle (season 2)
- Chris Conroy as Adam Grey (season 2)
- Chosen Jacobs as Zack Waller (season 2)
- Kara Royster as Emily (season 2)
- Tonya Pinkins as Marsha Smith (season 2)
- Cornelius Smith Jr. as Corey Smith (season 2)

=== Notable guest stars ===
- Annaleigh Ashford as Fliss
- Michael Vartan as Jeffrey Bloom
- Cara Buono as Karen
- Bryan Greenberg as Teddy Preston
- T. R. Knight as Gideon
- Samantha Marie Ware as Claire Thompson
- Tom Everett Scott as Paul Levine
- William Sadler as Rev. Elias
- K. Todd Freeman as Bishop Thompson
- Judd Hirsch as Abe Cohen
- Amber Stevens West as Julia, Trish's daughter
- Carl Lumbly as Alphonse Jeffries
- Peppermint as Pastor Olivia
- Lonnie Chavis as CJ Smith
- Amy Acker as Tammy Marshall
- Taylor Richardson as Kylie Marshall

== Episodes ==
Season	Episodes	Originally released	
Season	Episodes	First released	Last released
1	20	September 30, 2018	April 14, 2019
2	22	September 29, 2019	April 26, 2020

=== Season 1 (2018–19) ===
No. overall	No. in season	Title	Directed by	Written by	Original release date	Prod. code	U.S. viewers (millions)
1	1	"Pilot"	Marcos Siega	Steven Lilien & Bryan Wynbrandt	September 30, 2018 (Note: The pilot received an early digital release on August 31, 2018.)	T33.01002	10.14
Miles Finer, the son of a priest, now runs a podcast ("The Millennial Prophet") about his atheism. He receives a Facebook friend request from "God." Although he suspects it is a hoax, he nevertheless follows up on the first suggested friend and saves the man's life when he tries to commit suicide by jumping in front of a subway train. He meets his second suggested friend, Cara, an online writer with writer's block. When Miles's computer malfunctions at his home, Cara sees her long-missing mother in a picture of Miles with his family at the hospital. Miles convinces Cara to see her mother. When Cara finds out her mother has another daughter, she runs into the street in shock and is hit by a car. A doctor emerges from a taxi several cars back to save Cara's life; the doctor is the man Miles saved earlier in the subway.
2	2	"The Good Samaritan"	Marcos Siega	Steven Lilien & Bryan Wynbrandt	October 7, 2018	T40.10102	8.37
As Miles prepares for his first national podcast about atheism, he gets another friend request from the God account that leads him to help a single mother connect with her autistic son. Cara gets closer to her estranged mother, while Ali convinces her father to support Miles and congratulate him on his podcast's success. Miles disagrees with his new producer, who wants a one-sided presentation about atheism. Miles instead wants his show to be more of an open conversation. Due to the change in tone, Miles's podcast loses over half its audience. Meanwhile, Rakesh is disappointed to see his new love interest Jaya on a date with another guy, but it turns out the date had been scheduled before Jaya met Rakesh, and she is only interested in dating him.
3	3	"Heavenly Taco Truck"	Kenneth Fink	Robert Hull	October 14, 2018	T40.10103	7.90
The God account sends Miles a place recommendation for a taco truck instead of a friend suggestion. While Miles is there, a boy steals his wallet. Miles and Cara hire Ray, an ex-police officer and private investigator, to find the boy. It turns out the boy, Isaac, is living on his own, with his mother absent, and that Ray's deceased wife was Isaac's social worker. Both Isaac and Ray are lost without her, and in the end Ray takes in Isaac as a foster child.
4	4	"Error Code 1.61"	Marcos Siega	Allison Moore	October 21, 2018	T40.10104	8.86
Miles is excited that Rakesh is close to cracking the God account's firewall when all the computers at their work crash with an error code of 1.61, which is an approximation of the Fibonacci ratio. This leads Miles, Cara, Rakesh and Jaya to the Hayden Planetarium looking for answers. Miles and Cara find Fliss, a woman from a small town who is in New York looking for her lost love based on a list of locations he gave her when they were at camp together. Rakesh and Jaya find Beaker, a staff member at the Planetarium who is looking for a lost star using software that Rakesh recognizes as being associated with the God account. It turns out that Beaker is Fliss's lost love. He's gay, so they won't be romantic, but Fliss decides she will move to New York anyway to restart her life and be Beaker's friend. At the same time, Arthur takes his damaged saxophone to a repair shop to fix and donate. It was damaged in the car accident that killed Miles's mother, and Arthur hasn't played since. Miles retrieves the repaired saxophone and he and Ali tell their father that their mother wouldn't want him to stop playing.
5	5	"Unfriended"	Erin Feeley	Safia M. Dirie	October 28, 2018	T40.10105	6.94
The God account sends Miles a friend recommendation for Rachel, but he decides to do nothing about it, and the God account disappears. Prodded by Rakesh and Cara, Miles investigates and learns that Rachel is an alcoholic artist whose sister died in a car accident they were in several weeks earlier. They were fighting at the time, and Rachel believes nothing can fix the fact that her sister hated her at the moment of her death. Miles finds the man credited with pulling Rachel from the car before it exploded, and learns that the man was just a bystander; in fact, Rachel's sister pulled her from the car, and died going back for her cell phone to call 911. Miles tells Rachel that her sister obviously loved her, and Rachel finds peace and strives to become sober. Meanwhile, Rakesh finds out Jaya has a medical fellowship that will take her away from New York for up to a year. He reacts badly at first, but on Ali's advice, throws Jaya a congratulations party and tells her he is happy for her. After talking with his father, Miles comes to terms with the idea that he might have a calling to do good in the world, and the God account reappears. He sends it a friend request, and it accepts.
6	6	"A House Divided"	Louis Milito	Story by : Robert Hill; Teleplay by : Steven Lilien & Bryan Wynbrandt	November 4, 2018	T40.10106	7.40
As he is hailing a cab, Miles gets a friend suggestion for Hasan, who turns out to be the cab driver. Later, Miles learns that Hasan's daughter Tara has fallen in love with David, a devout Jew she is planning to marry without Hasan's (or David's parents) knowledge or consent. Hasan confronts Tara and David (and Miles) at the courthouse just before their marriage. Miles tries to reason with Hasan, but fails, and Tara reluctantly leaves with her father. At a loss, Miles consults with his father, who explains how a child losing faith can feel to a parent like losing them altogether. Meanwhile, Rakesh breaks the God account's encryption with Cara's help, and they learn about a particular train leaving Grand Central Station later that night. Hasan confronts Miles at his uncle's 25th wedding anniversary party because Tara has run away. Miles realizes that the train isn't the location of whoever is behind the God account, but of David and Tara. Miles reasons with Hasan using what his father said, and at the train station Hasan reconciles with Tara. At the end, Miles learns that Hasan was the driver of the cab the doctor got out of to save Cara's life in episode 1.
7	7	"The Prodigal Son"	Marcos Siega	Carmen Pilar Golden	November 11, 2018	T40.10107	7.87
Miles is forced to face uncomfortable truths about his family when the "God" account points him towards his Uncle Terrance. Also, Cara's father pays her a visit, and he discovers that she's reconnected with her mom who left them when she was a child.
8	8	"Matthew 621"	Holly Dale	Jessica Granger	November 18, 2018	T40.10108	7.51
The God account suggests a new friend for Miles who is "a lawyer, 71, and as of a month ago, dead". Meanwhile, Arthur tries to sell his old saxophone.
9	9	"King's Gambit"	Tricia Brock	Richard Lowe	November 25, 2018	T40.10109	8.09
Rather than a person, the God account sends Miles a fan page of a chess legend who vanished 10 years ago. Miles must find out what happened to the man behind the legend with the help of a private investigator, hired by the legend's last opponent before he vanished, who Miles had helped out in a previous episode. Meanwhile Arthur is having problems with the God account, feeling Miles is using it as fodder for ratings on his podcast.
10	10	"Coney Island Cyclone"	Marcos Siega	Robert Hull	December 9, 2018	T40.10110	7.51
The God account gives Miles a suggestion for a member of his father's church who's had a recent tragedy. Meanwhile Rakesh and Cara get another step closer to finding Falken, and Miles and his father reach a new place in their relationship.
11	11	"17 Years"	Tamra Davis	Steven Lilien & Bryan Wynbrandt	December 16, 2018	T40.10111	8.53
A friend suggestion brings Miles to the man who killed his mother Ella 17 years before.
12	12	"Ready Player Two"	Darren Grant	Story by : Devanshi Patel; Teleplay by : Lara Azzopardi	January 6, 2019	T40.10112	7.16
Miles received friend suggestion of a girl that was dropped off at Arthur's church.
13	13	"Miracle on 123rd Street"	Marcos Siega	Andre Edmonds	January 13, 2019	T40.10113	8.25
The God Account gives Miles 76 Friend Suggestions. Miles finds out that the 76 people are at risk for losing their apartment homes. Ali moves in with Miles and Rakesh finds some news at work.
14	14	"The Trouble with the Curve"	Victor Nelli Jr.	Safia M. Dirie	February 17, 2019	T40.10114	7.19
Miles finds his old high school baseball teammate Cal and gets a Friend Suggestion for a student that Cal is coaching.
15	15	"Two Guys, a Girl and a Thai Food Place"	Marcos Siega	Jessica Ball	March 3, 2019	T40.10115	6.86
Miles and Cara help a woman named Vivian who wakes up from a coma with no memory. Rakesh meets Simon Hayes and Arthur's mentorship starts badly.
16	16	"Scenes From an Italian Restaurant"	Joe Morton	Story by : Carmen Pilar Golden; Teleplay by : Robert Hull	March 10, 2019	T40.10116	6.63
Miles and Cara help a sous chef open up a new restaurant and her dreams are falling apart. Ali and Miles are worried that the diocese sent Lester to replace Arthur. The episode ends with a passionate kiss between Miles and Cara who officially become a couple.
17	17	"The Dragon Slayer"	Geoff Shotz	Story by : Lara Azzopardi; Teleplay by : Steven Lilien & Bryan Wynbrandt	March 17, 2019	T40.10117	7.73
Miles helps a homeless man find a job and gets him and his son a place to live. Miles also joins a podcast network that wants exclusive rights to the God Account story, but his career could be in jeopardy when Cara's boss gives her a conflicting assignment.
18	18	"Return to Sender"	Joe Morton	Lydia Teffera & Sam Lifshutz	March 24, 2019	T40.10118	7.53
A package delivered to Miles has a connection with a married couple mourning the loss of their daughter. Miles and Cara reunite with John Dove and Rakesh finds a connection between John Dove and Simon Hayes.
19	19	"The Road to Damascus"	Kyra Sedgwick	Robert Hull	March 31, 2019	T40.10119	8.16
Arthur and Miles go on a road trip to upstate New York to a camp that closed years ago. Pria delivers important news to Rakesh about Henry Chase, whose sister died in an accident at the camp. Simon Hayes's big announcement is ruined when Rakesh's well-meaning attempt to steal his code is foiled by Pria. Miles, Rakesh and Cara are shocked to discover Simon knows nothing about the God Account, especially after Miles gets Simon as his next friend suggestion.
20	20	"Que Sera Sera"	Gregory Smith	Steven Lilien & Bryan Wynbrandt	April 14, 2019	T40.10120	6.92
Miles, Cara and Rakesh finally meet Henry Chase. Simon, Henry and Pria team up again and invite Cara to join them and write their story. After discovering Henry isn’t “God,” Miles tells his dad he's OK with not knowing who’s behind the account. But the episode-ending twist reinvests Miles into the God Account's identity in a surprising way.

=== Season 2 (2019–20) ===
No. overall	No. in season	Title	Directed by	Written by	Original release date	Prod. code	U.S. viewers (millions)
21	1	"Joy"	Victor Nelli Jr.	Steven Lilien & Bryan Wynbrandt	September 29, 2019	T40.10201	7.13
The woman who got Miles as a friend suggestion turns out to be Joy, who came to New York after suddenly leaving the legal profession in Chicago. While Miles hasn't had any suggestions from the God account in weeks, Joy gets one for a soldier on leave who wants to return to Iraq despite having a heart condition that could kill him. In Paris, Simon helps Cara track down Annie, the woman who inspired her to be a journalist and whose friend suggestion five years ago helped Cara find her mom. But Cara discovers Annie blames Simon for ruining her career, and also learns Annie never sent her the friend suggestion. Meanwhile, Arthur is reluctant to leave the home he's known for years as Trish looks for a new place to live after they get married.
22	2	"The Lady"	Darren Grant	Robert Hull	October 6, 2019	T40.10202	6.41
Joy gets another friend suggestion, this time for self-help guru Teddy Preston, whose off-stage life is quite different from the positive image he pushes in his seminars. In Paris, Simon and Annie help Cara investigate the Facebook hack that led her to reconnect with her mother. Meanwhile, Miles finally gets his own message from the God account to "follow the lady, follow your path". Deducing it's the Statue of Liberty, he goes there but finds nothing. He gets a call from Cara, who is standing near a replica statue in Paris. The two determine that the God account wants Miles to be in Paris. Elsewhere, Arthur is hurt when Ali tells him she is leaving Harlem Episcopal and has applied for membership at an LGBTQ-inclusive church.
23	3	"From Paris with Love"	Marcos Siega	Safia M. Dirie	October 13, 2019	T40.10203	6.89
Miles is reunited with Cara in Paris, and the two continue to investigate the "follow the lady, follow your path" clue. This leaves Joy to work her first God account case without Miles' help, though she does get assistance from Rakesh. The two investigate Sarah, a parking enforcement officer who gave Joy a ticket. Together, they help Sarah find forgiveness when she blames herself for her gay brother being disowned by their parents. The brother now suffers from early-onset dementia. Miles and Cara find a painting in The Louvre by Audrey Grenelle that features a binary code pattern, which Miles plans to have Rakesh interpret when they return to New York. Miles tells Cara he loves her, but Cara says she can't respond because the last time she told someone "I love you," her mother left her. Miles fully accepts Cara's explanation, and assures her that he isn't going anywhere.
24	4	"All Those Yesterdays"	Kellie Cyrus	Matt Ward	October 20, 2019	T40.10204	6.26
The God Account sends Joy a friend suggestion, the daughter whom she placed for adoption and travelled to New York to check on. Her daughter, who plays on Cara's half-sister's soccer team, has been acting out because she has been unable to find out where she came from. The others urge caution and Joy gives her daughter some information about their family and its Hawaiian ancestry, without revealing that she is her mother. Joy then returns to Chicago for her disbarment hearing. Cara agrees to stay with her mother and returns to work at the magazine as a junior writer. Miles and Cara just miss Audrey Grenelle at an art gallery.
25	5	"The Greater Good"	Marcos Siega	Logan Slakter	October 27, 2019	T40.10205	6.21
Miles gets a friend suggestion for Bishop Thompson's daughter Claire. They discover that Claire, a nurse and recovering addict, has been stealing drugs from the hospital where she works. However, she has been using the drugs for a clinic that serves the uninsured. Bishop Thompson uses his influence to get the police to release Claire and organises for a church charity to fund a legal clinic. He resign as Bishop, when his actions are revealed, to help Claire manage the clinic. Jaya's parents think that she and Rakesh should get married and provide them with some grandchildren, now that he has been promoted to head of R&D. So they pretend he got fired and fake-breakup on Facebook to avoid getting engaged.
26	6	"The Fighter"	Rich Newey	Kristi Korzec	November 3, 2019	T40.10206	6.49
Miles meets his next friend suggestion, Elena a social worker who worked with Ray's wife, at Ray's BBQ. Elena is bruised, but it is from her training for her first professional MMA bout. Miles and Cara learn that she was assaulted a couple of years ago, which is why she took up self-defense. Upon discovering that her assailant has been paroled, Miles, Cara and her young son rush stop her from fighting him. Elena confesses that she took up fighting because she was scared and has been neglecting her son. Cara writes an article about Elena but it fails to generate many hits. Trish is upset and leaves town when Arthur informs her that he has accepted the job as Bishop without talking with her. Ray and Sarah, the parking officer, track down Audrey Grenelle, the artist, through her parking tickets and Miles informs her that the code in her painting was meant for him.
27	7	"Instant Karma"	Marcos Siega	Steve Harper	November 10, 2019	T40.10207	6.10
Miles helps a lawyer whose firm, which he runs with his brother, is on the brink of folding. The lawyer is convinced he's been affected by bad karma ever since he found a $1 million lottery ticket and made plans to cash it himself rather than find the ticket's owner. The team also continues their attempts to decode Audrey Grenelle's painting, and eventually do so. The painting reveals a house in New Jersey which is the first place the God account ever sent Miles and Cara. Elsewhere, Arthur ruminates over Trish.
28	8	"The Last Grenelle"	Lionel Coleman	Carmen Pilar Golden	November 17, 2019	T40.10208	7.15
Miles and Cara find the house in New Jersey to be occupied by a new owner, Gideon, who knows all about the God account because he received friend requests from it long before Miles. Insisting that it's really God behind the account, Gideon said he was forced to choose between the account and starting a life with the woman he loves. He chose the latter, leaving one friend request five years ago that he never followed up on: Audrey Grenelle. Miles and Cara help Gideon close the book on his final friend request, while helping Audrey finally get past the family incident that changed her life. After a successful resolution, Gideon hints that Miles may be "the prophet" that the God account seeks, and if so, may be faced with a choice: continue his work with the account or have a life with Cara. Meanwhile, Arthur and Rakesh both come to a crossroads in their respective relationships.
29	9	"Prophet & Loss"	Barbara Brown	Robert Hull	November 24, 2019	T40.10209	5.86
Miles' next friend suggestion is Cara's stepfather, Paul Levine, whom he learns is on the brink of financial ruin with his investment company. To recover his clients' losses, Paul has resorted to insider trading and is seen consulting with the target of a story that Cara is working with her partner. Despite Cara asking him to stay out of it, Miles implores Paul to do the right thing. After almost fleeing to Canada, Paul instead takes a plea deal that will result in him spending one to two years in prison. Cara accuses Miles of putting the God account before her, much like Gideon suggested might happen. Elsewhere, Arthur finds his new agenda being blocked by Reverend Elias, a very conservative member of his board who cites Arthur's children and out-of-wedlock relationship with Trish as reasons he should step down. Surprisingly, it's Trish who gets Arthur to stand up for what he believes is best for the church. Also, Rakesh fails to win his supervisor's approval on a major project at work, and he seeks advice from Ali.
30	10	"High Anxiety"	Charissa Sanjarernsuithikul	Steven Lilien & Bryan Wynbrandt	December 8, 2019	T40.10210	6.81
Miles and Rakesh help a new friend suggestion, a high-rise window washer named Miguel, who has sabotaged his platform in hopes that his "accidental" death will provide enough insurance money to continue the expensive care for his daughter Ava until she is able to get a new kidney. Despite wanting to walk away from the God account, Cara agrees to help when she learns a life is in danger, and she retrieves Miguel's wife to help talk him down. Miles insists that between his podcast and Cara's journalism outlets, they can raise the money to help Ava. However, Ava takes a turn for the worse and will need a kidney almost immediately, forcing Miles to come up with a creative solution. Miles had told Cara that Miguel will be his last friend suggestion, as he wants to choose her over the account. Seeing how Miles just effectively saved two lives, Cara insists she could never live with the thought that she prevented Miles from doing more good work, and she ends their relationship. Elsewhere, Arthur makes good on his promise to balance church duties with spending time with Trish, causing Trish to say she wants to marry him as soon as possible. Also, Joy returns to New York for a work assignment, and tells Miles and Rakesh she has some insight on the source of the God account.
31	11	"A New Hope"	Marcos Siega	Safia M. Dirie	January 5, 2020	T40.10211	5.38
Through her legal work, Joy reveals she discovered that many of the God account friend suggestions are clients of the same insurance company: New York Sun. Rakesh does some hacking and sees that everyone the group has helped was a client. He also discovers a back door and he and Miles locate the man hacking into the insurance company client profiles. The hacker reveals he was hired by a man named Alphonse Jeffries to create the back door. While Rakesh tracks down that lead, Miles and Joy help an elderly holocaust survivor named Abe (Judd Hirsch), who noticed his father's gold watch on a jewelry auction site and hopes it can lead him to answers about his long-lost sister, Rose. Soon after a successful resolution of that case, Miles learns that Alphonse and Arthur served in Vietnam together and, in fact, Arthur saved Alphonse's life. Having revealed that he and Trish are getting married that weekend, Arthur says he invited Alphonse to the wedding. Now convinced that Alphonse is the source of the God account, Miles tries to win back Cara. Cara agrees that their love is worth any risk, but she is also hiding a secret: as Cara was visiting the hospital that her mother was applying to she saw Ali at the hospital coming out of the Oncology department, and Ali revealed she was not ok.
32	12	"BFF"	Annabelle Frost	Steven Lilien & Bryan Wynbrandt	January 12, 2020	T40.10212	6.19
While preparing to confront Alphonse Jeffries at Arthur's wedding, Miles receives a friend suggestion that turns out to be Trish's daughter, Julia (Amber Stevens West). Julia and her husband, whom she has known since they were childhood best friends, are now going through a divorce. Miles learns that Julia is also hiding a big secret from her estranged husband. Rakesh and Joy are finally able to corner Jeffries, and he agrees to lunch with them. When Jeffries is a no-show for lunch, Miles tracks him down. He tells Jeffries he knows he's behind the God account, but Jeffries denies it. Miles then asks Jeffries why he would hire a hacker to create a back door for the New York Sun client information, and Jeffries replies he didn't hire anyone. Miles, Rakesh and Joy then race to the apartment where they previously met the hacker, and find it completely cleaned out except for one item: a Queen of Hearts playing card. Meanwhile, Ali learns that the lump in her breast tested positive for cancer.
33	13	"The Princess and the Hacker"	Marcos Siega	Kristi Korzec	February 16, 2020	T40.10213	5.42
Rakesh gives Cara and Miles a demonstration of his new soulmate algorithm, and is shocked when it matches him with a princess from a central African country who also comes up as Miles' friend suggestion. The princess, Lulu, is currently attending Columbia University, but speaks about her father, King Omari, coming to America to pronounce her as the first-ever female leader of their country. However, Lulu is crossed up when her father instead proclaims he'll be announcing Lulu's brother Zian as his successor. After learning that Omari is only trying to protect Lulu from the inevitable backlash in their country, Miles and the group convince the king that Lulu's leadership is worth the risk. Meanwhile, Ali upsets her father by proclaiming she wants to delay cancer treatment until after she gets her eggs frozen, knowing that chemotherapy can cause women to be infertile. In a conversation with Trish, Ali becomes convinced that the possibility of having a child will give her a reason to fight.
34	14	"Raspberry Pie"	Joe Morton	Logan Slakter	February 23, 2020	T40.10214	5.95
Miles receives a friend suggestion for himself, but Rakesh discovers it's actually for a cloned account. They notice that a phony Save the Whales fundraiser is on the cloned account, and has already received donations. Rakesh locates the hacker, a 16-year-old coding whiz named Zack (Chosen Jacobs) who is working as an intern at the Department of Defense. They learn Zach is raising money to purchase a Raspberry Pi device, which he plans to use to hack into the DoD servers and get the real story about his mother, a soldier who was killed in Afghanistan. Elsewhere, Cara and her former work partner, Adam, follow up on a lead about the hacker who left the queen of hearts card, discovering it's actually a key card for an exclusive underground poker game. Also, Ali meets a woman named Emily (Kara Royster) in the fertility clinic waiting room. Emily later asks Ali out on a date, but Ali refuses because she doesn't want to be a burden with her chemo treatments on the horizon.
35	15	"The Last Little Thing"	Marcos Siega	Robert Hull	March 1, 2020	T40.10215	6.01
Miles' next friend suggestion is Anna, a terminally ill patient whose aggressive cancer has led her to live out her remaining days to the fullest instead of seeking further treatment. Miles believes he's been charged with helping Anna return to treatment, but after discovering Anna was one of Arthur's parishioners who had a crisis of faith two years earlier, Miles realizes he's supposed to help Anna regain her faith before she passes away. Meanwhile, Cara and Rakesh follow up on hacker Aaron Lee's underground poker game and learn they can obtain a birth certificate that Aaron mentioned, but they need Ray Nicollette's help to give the certificate's owner what he wants in exchange. The birth certificate is for a Corey Smith, whose father is listed as Alphonse Jeffries. Also, Ali begins her chemotherapy.
36	16	"The Atheist Papers"	Erin Richards	Jessica Granger	March 8, 2020	T40.10216	5.90
Miles gets a chance to meet Daryl Watkins (Kevin Carroll), a renowned author on atheism whom Miles says had a profound effect on him many years ago, but Miles is hurt when Watkins criticizes his podcast. Miles immediately gets Watkins as his next friend suggestion, later finding out that Watkins has been considering the possibility that God exists after falling in love with a female pastor. Meanwhile, the group follows up on the Corey Smith lead, whom Rakesh says has had no social media presence or even credit card activity for ten years. They locate his mother, Marsha (Tonya Pinkins), who has nothing nice to say about Corey's absentee father, Alphonse Jeffries. She does say that Corey was in the military for many years before being discharged ten years ago. Rakesh learns from his new intern Zack that Corey received a D-13 discharge, which means he was moved to some covert operation at the Department of Defense. This leads the group to consider that the God account may be a DoD project. Also, Ali collapses during her first date with Emily and is rushed to the hospital. Doctors think it was only exhaustion from her chemo treatments.
37	17	"Harlem Cinema House"	Marcos Siega	Pilar Golden & Steve Harper	March 15, 2020	T40.10217	5.97
After Miles proposes to take Ali to a movie at the historic Harlem Cinema House, the God Account likes The Maltese Falcon. While at the theater, Miles gets friend suggestions for the three remaining employees: owner Mr. Johnson, counter clerk Haley, and projectionist Leo. Mr. Johnson says that they are closing the cinema for good in two days. He notes that an antique ruby ring he gave his late wife would provide enough money to save the cinema, but it was stolen over a year ago. After noting that Mr. Johnson turned her life around by hiring her when no one else would, Haley reveals she stole the ring from Mr. Johnson's house before she knew who he was. Her attempt to retrieve it from her former fence fails. Meanwhile, Rakesh tries to help Leo, an aspiring filmmaker, repair his corrupted short film file so he can submit it to the NYU film festival, which offers a scholarship for the winner. After the God Account likes The Maltese Falcon a second time, Miles figures out how to save the cinema. Meanwhile, Reverend Elias accuses Arthur of cutting his "fresh start" program from the church budget for personal reasons. Arthur staunchly denies it, but after conversing with Trish, realizes Rev. Elias may be right.
38	18	"Almost Famous"	Gregory Smith	Joe Webb & Brian Ford Sullivan	March 29, 2020	T40.10218	6.24
Miles sees that the God account has liked a YouTube video by 16-year-old singer Kylie ( Taylor Richardson) and later learns that Kylie's mother, Tammy (Amy Acker), is the hospital administrator in charge of a promising drug trial in which Ali hopes to get accepted. Miles tries to balance helping Kylie convince her mother to let her go on tour while not jeopardizing Ali's chances of getting a trial invitation but ultimately decides he must give Kylie the attention he would give to any other friend suggestion. While Miles helps Kylie and Tammy heal their wounds, he learns that Ali doesn't qualify for the trial because of a heart valve condition. Meanwhile, Cara continues to work on the Corey Smith lead, tracking down his mother, Marsha, a second time. After Marsha goes to see Arthur, Cara gets a visit from a Department of Defense official who wants to know why she's interested in Corey Smith. Eventually, Marsha arranges for Cara and Miles to meet with Corey. Also, Adam presses Cara about why she hasn't told Miles they are dating.
39	19	"The Fugitive"	Bola Ogun	Richard Lowe	April 12, 2020	T40.10219	5.69
Miles, Cara and Rakesh meet with Corey Smith, who says he was working on a predictive analytics program for Darpa when it was stolen seven years ago. Corey and Rakesh consult Zack for help in hacking into the DoD mainframe again, with hopes of locating Corey's code and identifying who is manipulating it for the God account. Meanwhile, Miles and Cara follow up on friend suggestion Russell, a single father with a baby who fails to appear for a hearing on a grand theft auto charge. They track down Russell before he flees to Buffalo, and learn that he was just hired to transport the vehicle. They get former friend suggestions Sameer and Jai to represent Russell, but he is still captured by bounty hunter Bonnie. Russell and Bonnie bond over both being former foster children, and the group tracks down the man who hired Russell to move the vehicle. While Russell is absolved of the theft charge, he still has to serve six months for contempt and failure to appear. Bonnie agrees to look after Russell's child until he is freed. Also, Ali starts losing her hair, and lashes out at Miles and Arthur when they try to be supportive, while Miles becomes aware that Cara is dating Adam.
40	20	"Collateral Damage"	Darren Grant	Lydia Teffera & Sam Lifshutz	April 19, 2020	T40.10220	5.94
Miles encounters the first case of collateral damage from the God account when Trevor, a troll in his podcast comments section, shows up at a live podcast event. Trevor says he was just about to tell Rose, his late best friend's sister, that he loves her, when Miles and the God account reunited her with Lt. Fremont (S2.Ep1). Miles tries to reason with Trevor when he insists he will tell Rose how he feels at her rehearsal dinner. In anger, Trevor posts in the podcast comments that Miles is hiding his feelings for Cara. Miles asks Rakesh to remove the post as soon as he sees it. With help from Rakesh's soul mate app, Miles shows Trevor there is likely someone else who is right for him, but Trevor follows through on his plan. Though it leads to Rose telling Trevor she doesn't love him that way, Trevor gets needed closure, prompting him to tell Miles he should say how he feels about Cara. However, Adam saw the earlier post from Trevor, and he breaks up with Cara. Meanwhile, Rakesh, Zack and Corey are able to successfully hack Darpa, but while trying to locate the source of the code, the program crashes. Rakesh interprets this as the God account protecting itself, but later learns that Corey installed a virus to destroy the account. Also, Ali becomes suspicious when Emily lies about seeing another woman.
41	21	"Miracles"	Victor Nelli Jr.	Robert Hull	April 26, 2020	T40.10221	6.31
Miles gets a corrupted friend request, and Rakesh is only able to make out the last name "Smith". Soon after, Miles encounters Corey's son CJ sitting in a church. CJ says he was visited by an angel while in a coma, and the angel instructed him to get his grandfather, Alphonse Jeffries, and father to reconcile. Corey doesn't believe his son, but CJ later tells a story about Corey that he had no way of knowing. Corey is arrested for hacking Darpa. Miles and Arthur track down Alphonse, who says he was in the CIA for 20 years and left Corey and his mother to protect them. Alphonse uses his connections to get Corey released from custody. While meeting with Corey and Miles, Alphonse says he secretly visited CJ while he was in his coma, and is likely the "angel" CJ heard. However, Alphonse says CJ brought up one other detail that he never mentioned during his hospital visit. Corey and Alphonse finally start to heal. Meanwhile, Cara says Miles is still in love with her when visiting her mother, but that she has moved on and loves Adam. Her mother says Cara should be honest with Miles, as does Ali when Cara visits her. Cara also learns that her stepfather Paul is getting out of prison early, and that her mother, stepfather and stepsister will all be returning to Ohio for a fresh start. Also, Rakesh realizes he used some of the God account code to create his soulmate app, and can use that code to repair the God account.
42	22	"The Mountain"	Bryan Wynbrandt	Steven Lilien	April 26, 2020	T40.10222	6.10
Having gotten Ali as his next friend suggestion, Miles comes to suspect that the God account wants him to stop her surgery due to a danger; Miles arrives too late only to learn that Ali already knew and proceeded anyway. After Ali suffers a complication, Miles finally prays and regains his lost faith when Ali pulls through. Over a montage of all the people that he has helped, Miles explains to his audience the happy ending that he and his family and friends got, including him and Cara reuniting as a couple as well as Rakesh and Jaya. As well, Miles discovers a clue in Ali's Bible that the God account pointed him to. A year to the day after Miles got the friend suggestion for Ali, Miles gets a message directing him to a Himalayan mountaintop to finally get his answers about the God account. On the mountain, Miles is greeted by a young monk who calls Miles by name and tells him that "she" is waiting for him. With a smile, Miles follows the monk to finally learn the truth.

== Production ==
=== Development ===
On August 31, 2017, it was announced that Steven Lilien and Wynbrandt had decided to develop the pilot and had teamed with Greg Berlanti and Sarah Schechter to develop the concept. Warner Bros. Television was shopping the show to the American broadcast networks. Both Lilien and Wynbrandt would write the series, while Berlanti and Schechter would serve as executive producers through Berlanti Productions, and Marcos Siega would direct the pilot. CBS ordered a pilot on January 23, 2018. In addition to Berlanti and Schechter, Lilien and Wynbrandt would also serve as executive producers for the series. The pilot was picked up straight-to-series by CBS on May 11, 2018 and the series premiered on September 30, 2018. On October 19, 2018, CBS picked up the series for a full season of 20 episodes.

On January 29, 2019, the series was renewed for a second season which premiered on September 29, 2019. On March 13, 2020, Warner Bros. Television announced that production would be suspended due to the COVID-19 pandemic. On April 14, 2020, CBS announced the series had been canceled after two seasons, and the last two episodes aired on April 26, 2020.

The last-filmed episode was reworked into a series finale, and several scenes utilized stock footage from previous episodes to supplant filming sessions that had to be cancelled. The final scene in the Himalayas utilizes location footage that was shot in Utah during the filming of the pilot, but reserved for potential use in a series finale: Lilien explained that "we had that great footage, we were just hoping that we weren't going to have to use it for another couple of years. Then we crafted a montage leading into it with all of our characters and all of the friend suggestions that had left a mark as a love letter to the fans."

=== Casting ===
On February 5, 2018, it was announced that Brandon Micheal Hall had joined the production as Miles Finer. Several additional cast members were announced in February 2018. Suraj Sharma and Javicia Leslie would portray Rakesh Singh and Ali Finer, then four days later Joe Morton was announced as Rev. Arthur Finer. Finally, Violett Beane was cast as Cara Bloom.

On June 11, 2019, it was reported that Erica Gimpel was promoted as a series regular for second season.

== Reception ==
=== Critical response ===
On the review aggregator website Rotten Tomatoes, the series has an approval rating of 59% based on 29 reviews, with an average rating of 6.36 out of 10. The site's critical consensus for season one reads, "A sincere and thoughtful handling of spiritual themes helps God Friended Me overcome—and even benefit from—its earnest approach to a potentially off-putting premise." Metacritic, which uses a weighted average, assigned a score of 57 out of 100 based on 14 critics, indicating "mixed or average reviews".

In his review of the show's pilot episode, Matthew Gilbert of The Boston Globe wrote that "Based on the title alone, I was fully prepared to despise this show", but declared that "the premiere holds some promise as a thoughtful feel-good drama." Michael Starr of the New York Post wrote that "While 'God Friended Me' does sometimes stray into saccharine-sweet, 'Touched By An Angel'-type territory [...] it doesn't overstay its welcome and seems to know when to dial it back and inject some levity into the proceedings." Steve Greene of IndieWire gave the show a grade of "C", writing that "It's anchored by a likable cast, and works from an admirably high-concept premise, but for now the result is an overstuffed hodgepodge of exaggerated emotions and familiar swings at family drama."

Vinnie Mancuso of Collider gave the show a rating of three stars, calling Hall's performance as Miles "endlessly likable" but writing that the show is "heavy on the hamminess, rooted in religion and old-fashioned morality, and misunderstands the lifestyle of your average human under the age of 35 on every fundamental level". Hemant Mehta of Patheos wrote that God Friended Me is "not a bad show", but criticized the show for presenting Miles' atheism as being a result of his mother's death. Mehta wrote that "In short, he's an atheist because he went through something traumatic [...] it bears no resemblance to why so many atheists today don't believe in God."

=== Ratings ===
The website TV Series Finale acknowledged that during the show's second season, ratings averaged 25% less in the key 18-49 demo compared to the first season. Overall viewership fell 20% compared to the first season. TVLine reported that God Friended Me had the "smallest gain via Live+7 DVR playback — just 23 percent — of any scripted CBS program."

Viewership and ratings per season of God Friended Me
Season	Timeslot (ET)	Episodes	First aired		Last aired		TV season	Viewership rank	Avg. viewers (millions)
Season	Timeslot (ET)	Episodes	Date	Viewers (millions)	Date	Viewers (millions)	TV season	Viewership rank	Avg. viewers (millions)
1	Sunday 8:00 p.m.	20	September 30, 2018	10.14	April 14, 2019	6.92	2018–19	30	9.62
2	Sunday 8:00 p.m.	22	September 29, 2019	7.13	April 26, 2020	6.10	2019–20	42	7.62

==== Season 1 ====
Viewership and ratings per episode of God Friended Me
No.	Title	Air date	Rating/share (18–49)	Viewers (millions)	DVR (18–49)	DVR viewers (millions)	Total (18–49)	Total viewers (millions)
1	"Pilot"	September 30, 2018	1.3/5	10.14	—N/a	2.01	—N/a	12.15
2	"The Good Samaritan"	October 7, 2018	0.9/4	8.37	—N/a	1.91	—N/a	10.29
3	"Heavenly Taco Truck"	October 14, 2018	1.0/5	7.90	0.4	2.11	1.4	10.01
4	"Error Code 1.61"	October 21, 2018	1.2/5	8.86	0.4	1.95	1.6	10.82
5	"Unfriended"	October 28, 2018	0.7/3	6.94	0.3	1.95	1.0	8.90
6	"A House Divided"	November 4, 2018	0.8/3	7.40	0.3	1.91	1.1	9.32
7	"The Prodigal Son"	November 11, 2018	1.0/5	7.87	0.4	1.97	1.4	9.85
8	"Matthew 621"	November 18, 2018	0.8/3	7.51	0.3	1.88	1.1	9.39
9	"King's Gambit"	November 25, 2018	1.0/5	8.09	0.3	1.89	1.3	9.99
10	"Coney Island Cyclone"	December 9, 2018	0.8/3	7.51	—N/a	1.85	—N/a	9.37
11	"17 Years"	December 16, 2018	1.1/4	8.53	0.3	1.80	1.4	10.34
12	"Ready Player Two"	January 6, 2019	0.9/4	7.16	0.2	1.97	1.1	9.14
13	"Miracle on 123rd Street"	January 13, 2019	0.9/4	8.25	—N/a	1.67	—N/a	9.92
14	"The Trouble with the Curve"	February 17, 2019	0.6/3	7.19	0.4	1.81	1.0	9.01
15	"Two Guys, a Girl, and a Thai Food Place"	March 3, 2019	0.7/3	6.86	0.2	1.76	0.9	8.63
16	"Scenes From an Italian Restaurant"	March 10, 2019	0.6/3	6.63	0.3	1.83	0.9	8.46
17	"The Dragon Slayer"	March 17, 2019	0.8/4	7.73	0.2	1.53	1.0	9.26
18	"Return to Sender"	March 24, 2019	0.9/4	7.53	0.2	1.60	1.1	9.13
19	"The Road To Damascus"	March 31, 2019	1.1/4	8.16	0.2	1.62	1.3	9.79
20	"Que Sera Sera"	April 14, 2019	0.6/3	6.92	0.3	1.62	0.9	8.55

==== Season 2 ====
Viewership and ratings per episode of God Friended Me
No.	Title	Air date	Rating/share (18–49)	Viewers (millions)	DVR (18–49)	DVR viewers (millions)	Total (18–49)	Total viewers (millions)
1	"Joy"	September 29, 2019	0.9/4	7.13	0.2	1.87	1.1	9.00
2	"The Lady"	October 6, 2019	0.7/3	6.41	0.2	1.50	0.9	7.91
3	"From Paris with Love"	October 13, 2019	0.9/4	6.89	0.2	1.54	1.1	8.44
4	"All Those Yesterdays"	October 20, 2019	0.6/3	6.26	—N/a	—N/a	—N/a	—N/a
5	"The Greater Good"	October 27, 2019	0.8/3	6.21	—N/a	1.44	—N/a	7.66
6	"The Fighter"	November 3, 2019	0.7/3	6.49	0.2	1.53	0.9	8.02
7	"Instant Karma"	November 10, 2019	0.6/3	6.10	0.2	1.45	0.8	7.56
8	"The Last Grenelle"	November 17, 2019	0.8/4	7.15	—N/a	—N/a	—N/a	—N/a
9	"Prophet & Loss"	November 24, 2019	0.6/2	5.86	—N/a	—N/a	—N/a	—N/a
10	"High Anxiety"	December 8, 2019	0.9/4	6.81	—N/a	1.41	—N/a	8.23
11	"A New Hope"	January 5, 2020	0.4/2	5.38	—N/a	—N/a	—N/a	—N/a
12	"BFF"	January 12, 2020	0.8/3	6.19	—N/a	—N/a	—N/a	—N/a
13	"The Princess and the Hacker"	February 16, 2020	0.4	5.42	0.2	1.45	0.6	6.88
14	"Raspberry Pie"	February 23, 2020	0.6	5.95	0.1	1.25	0.7	7.20
15	"The Last Little Thing"	March 1, 2020	0.6	6.01	0.2	1.30	0.7	7.31
16	"The Atheist Papers"	March 8, 2020	0.5	5.90	0.2	1.33	0.6	7.24
17	"Harlem Cinema House"	March 15, 2020	0.6	5.97	0.2	1.36	0.8	7.33
18	"Almost Famous"	March 29, 2020	0.6	6.24	0.2	1.28	0.7	7.53
19	"The Fugitive"	April 12, 2020	0.6	5.69	TBD	TBD	TBD	TBD
20	"Collateral Damage"	April 19, 2020	0.5	5.94	TBD	TBD	TBD	TBD
21	"Miracles"	April 26, 2020	0.6	6.31	TBD	TBD	TBD	TBD
22	"The Mountain"	April 26, 2020	0.5	6.10	TBD	TBD	TBD	TBD

== Broadcast ==
God Friended Me premiered in the United States and Canada on September 30, 2018. The series premiered in Australia on November 5, 2018.
