= Chi-Raq =

- Theatrical release poster
- Directed by: Spike Lee
- Written by: Kevin Willmott; Spike Lee
- Based on: Lysistrata by Aristophanes
- Produced by: Spike Lee
- Starring: Nick Cannon; Wesley Snipes; Teyonah Parris; Jennifer Hudson; Steve Harris; Harry Lennix; D.B. Sweeney; Angela Bassett; John Cusack; Samuel L. Jackson
- Cinematography: Matthew Libatique
- Edited by: Ryan Denmark; Hye Mee Na
- Music by: Terence Blanchard
- Production companies: Amazon Studios; 40 Acres and a Mule Filmworks
- Distributed by: Roadside Attractions; Lionsgate
- Release date: December 4, 2015 (United States)
- Running time: 127 minutes
- Country: United States
- Language: English
- Budget: $15 million
- Box office: $2.7 million

Chi-Raq (/ʃaɪˈræk/) is a 2015 American musical crime comedy drama film, directed and produced by Spike Lee and co-written by Lee and Kevin Willmott. Set in Chicago, the film focuses on the gang violence prevalent in neighborhoods on the city's south side, particularly the Englewood neighborhood.

The story is based on Aristophanes' Lysistrata, a classical Greek comedy play in which women withhold sex from their husbands to put an end to the Peloponnesian War. It stars Nick Cannon, Wesley Snipes, Teyonah Parris, Jennifer Hudson, Angela Bassett, John Cusack, and Samuel L. Jackson.

The first film to be produced by Amazon Studios, it was released in select theaters on December 4, 2015, and on their video on demand service Amazon Instant Video on December 29.

== Plot ==
In Chicago's Southside, a war rages between two rival gangs: the Spartans, led by rapper/gang leader Demetrius Dupree (nicknamed "Chi-Raq"), and the Trojans, led by gang lord Sean Andrews (nicknamed "Cyclops"). Demetrius's lover Lysistrata grows disillusioned after several outbursts of violence near her, including a shootout at Demetrius's concert, an arson attack at their home while the two are having sexual intercourse and the accidental death of a young girl named Patti in a gang shooting. Following the arson attack, Lysistrata meets with Miss Helen Worthy, a well-read non-violence advocate who suggests she research about Leymah Gbowee, who led a peace movement to stop the Second Liberian Civil War and threatened a sex strike. Inspired by Worthy and Gbowee, Lysistrata organizes a meeting between herself and the lovers of the members of the separate gangs; all agree to withhold sex until the men agree to lay down arms, hence their plea, "No Peace, No Pussy".

Women of many neighborhoods and occupations join the boycott after the strike rapidly spreads across the city. Despite the strike's enormous membership, the gangs refuse to conclude their conflict. Following Patti's funeral, Lysistrata speaks with the local preacher Father Mike Corridan, who argues passionately against the American institutions that profit from the South Side's conflicts. Deciding that the problem is bigger than the gangs' resentment, Lysistrata and her women seduce their way into a military armory and capture it from its soldiers and their leader, General King Kong.

The takeover of the armory ignites a national crisis; the military and the police surround the site but are barred from storming the armory as the 75 unarmed women are not holding any hostages. The women's actions also popularize their boycott worldwide, inspiring women in other countries to organize their own sex strikes. Planned by Mayor McCloud and Commissioner Blades, the military attempts to lure the women out by playing seductive music but it fails after the women find the military's earplugs and the men themselves become unbearably aroused by the music, thus further amplifying their longing.

After three months, Cyclops's and Demetrius's gangs begin suffering from disillusionment, both from the absence of sexual intercourse and from having considerable time to reflect on their potential fate from belonging in a gang. Demetrius remains too stubborn to renounce the Spartans but agrees to organize a meeting with Lysistrata after the boycott spreads to Mayor McCloud's wife and to the first lady of the United States. The city arranges a deal, in which Demetrius and Lysistrata will meet each other in bed and whoever climaxes first loses and must agree to the other's terms, but Cyclops arrives to declare he and the Trojans are laying down their guns.

Lysistrata, Mayor McCloud, and Cyclops organize a truce the following day by signing a deal to end gun violence and build new hospitals and trauma centers. Demetrius refuses to sign and initially walks away, but Miss Worthy testifies about the death of her daughter, as confessed to by his father Jamel, which ultimately moves him. He admits to killing Patti and surrenders to the police.

== Cast ==
- Nick Cannon as Demetrius "Chi-Raq" Dupree
- Wesley Snipes as Sean "Cyclops" Andrews
- Teyonah Parris as Lysistrata
- Anya Engel-Adams as Rasheeda
- Jennifer Hudson as Irene
- Angela Bassett as Miss Helen Worthy
- John Cusack as Fr. Mike Corridan
- Samuel L. Jackson as Dolemedes
- Michelle Mitchenor as Indigo
- D.B. Sweeney as Mayor McCloud
- Harry J. Lennix as Commissioner Blades
- La La Anthony as Hecuba
- Felicia Pearson as Dania
- Jay Washington as Besomighty
- Dave Chappelle as Morris
- Steve Harris as Ole Duke
- David Patrick Kelly as General King Kong
- Irma P. Hall as Dr. Miss Aesop
- Isiah Whitlock Jr. as Bacchos
- Tink as Tabitha Crews
- Future as Lee
- Sage the Gemini as Benny

== Production ==
=== Casting ===
Rapper Kanye West was supposed to star in the film but dropped out, possibly due to scheduling conflicts. On July 21, 2015, it was announced that La La Anthony, Nick Cannon, Wesley Snipes, Jennifer Hudson, Angela Bassett, John Cusack, and Samuel L. Jackson had joined the cast. Dave Chappelle appeared in the film as the owner of a strip club, marking his first film role in 13 years since Undercover Brother. This film saw Lee reuniting with Bassett, Jackson, and Snipes, having worked with all three actors on earlier films such as Mo' Better Blues, Jungle Fever and Malcolm X.

=== Filming ===
Principal photography began in June 2015 and continued production through July. The project hired many local actors and had an open casting call in Chicago on May 9, 2015.

== Music ==
Chi-Raq: Original Motion Picture Soundtrack

Soundtrack album by various artists
- Released: December 4, 2015
- Genre: Soundtrack
- Length: 51:21
- Label: RCA Records
- Producers: Bruce Hornsby; Dave Sitek; Mali Music; Michael Drayton; Pete Martin; Pop & Oak; R. Kelly; Rico Cox; Sunny; Young Chop

Chi-Raq: Original Motion Picture Soundtrack, featuring music from the film, was released via digital download and physical formats on December 4, 2015, through RCA Records.

No.	Title	Writer(s)	Producer(s)	Length
1.	"Pray 4 My City" (performed by Nick Cannon)	Nick Cannon; Robert Amparan; Leroy Griffin, Jr.; Rico Cox	Rico Cox	3:07
2.	"Put the Guns Down" (performed by R. Kelly and Tink)	Robert Kelly; Trinity Home	R. Kelly	6:07
3.	"Contradiction" (performed by Mali Music and Jhené Aiko)	Kortney Pollard; Sunny Ibrahim	Sunny	4:00
4.	"Born in Chicago" (performed by Bruce Hornsby and the Noisemakers, Eryn Allen Kane and Sasha Go Hard)	Nicholas Gravenites	Bruce Hornsby	3:32
5.	"Sit Down for This" (performed by Mali Music)	Kortney Pollard; Dean McIntosh; Pete Martin	Pete "Boxsta" Martin	2:33
6.	"Desperately" (performed by Sam Dew)	Sam Dew; David Andrew Sitek	David Andrew Sitek	4:10
7.	"Simple" (performed by Treasure Davis and Kid Ink)	Treasure Davis; Brian Todd Collins; Andrew Wansel; Warren Felder; Ronald Colson; Stephen Mostyn	Pop & Oak	4:14
8.	"I Want to Live" (performed by Kymm Lewis)	Michael Drayton	Michael Drayton	4:08
9.	"My City" (performed by Nick Cannon)	Nick Cannon; Robert Amparan; Leroy Griffin, Jr.; Tyree Pittman; Willie Middleton; Tyrone Ollie; Tiwan Raybon	Young Chop	4:24
10.	"WGDB" (performed by Kevon Carter)	Kevon Carter	Michael Drayton	3:15
11.	"I See the Light" (performed by Sophia Byrd)	Michael Drayton	Michael Drayton	4:47
12.	"All Power" (performed by Cinque Cullar)	Carol Joy Cymbala; Frederick Washington; Jason Michael Webb	Michael Drayton	3:08
13.	"I Run" (performed by Jennifer Hudson)	Kortney Pollard	Mali Music; Harvey Mason, Jr. (co.)	3:56
Total length:				51:21

== Release ==
=== Theatrical ===
Chi-Raq was the first original film to be distributed by Amazon Studios. In addition, Roadside Attractions and Lionsgate partnered with the company for a limited release in theaters on December 4, 2015, with the film premiering on Amazon Instant Video.

=== Marketing ===
The first trailer for the film was released November 3, 2015.

=== Home Media ===
The film was released on DVD and Blu-ray on January 26, 2016 with the only special features being deleted scenes, a music video, and a shirt making-of featurette.

== Reception ==
=== Box office ===
The film had a limited release into North American theaters on December 4, 2015. It grossed $1,250,224 from 305 theaters in its opening weekend, including a $15,000+ per screen average on 22 screens in Chicago.

=== Critical response ===
Chi-Raq received generally positive reviews from critics. On Rotten Tomatoes, the film has rating of 82%, based on 151 reviews, an average rating of 7.35/10. The site's critical consensus states, "Chi-Raq is as urgently topical and satisfyingly ambitious as it is wildly uneven – and it contains some of Spike Lee's smartest, sharpest, and all-around entertaining late-period work." Metacritic reports a score of 77 out of 100, based on 37 critics, indicating "generally favorable reviews".

Metacritic also found Chi-Raq to be tied with Steve Jobs as the 27th most acclaimed film of 2015, with five critics having named it the year's greatest and 18 others having ranked it in third place or below.

The film was more polarizing amongst audiences. Bradford William Davis, writing for Christ and Pop Culture, interviewed two audience members, one of them Tyler Burns, an editor in chief at the Reformed African American Network, who was highly critical of the film’s mishandling of satire, speaking: "Well, Chi-Raq‘s biggest problem is that it’s not sure what movie it wants to be. It felt like a combination of two or three different films. Sometimes, it’s hard to tell when it’s serious or when it’s intentionally absurd. It’s a satire only when it wants to be. It never truly goes all the way. I find that to be particularly true when considering its handling of the source material. Lysistrata — the play the film is based on — doesn’t take the idea of a sex strike as a serious way of dealing with the societal issue of “inter-squad” violence. Meanwhile, Chi-Raq ranges from absurdist dance routines performed by women in the mood — to wise grandma Angela Bassett telling us it’s the only way to stop gun violence, with no question about the plan’s sincerity whatsoever."

Charles Mudede, writing for Portland Mercury, criticized the very premise of the film for transposing Lysistrata to 21st Century Chicago and missing the point of the original play, writing: "There was no need at all for the black women in Chi-Raq to take their struggle for social justice (ending “systemic oppression, gendered violence, and economic instability”—to use Oluo’s words) from the stage or the street into the bedroom for a classic battle of the sexes. This only set the BLM back by 50 years (if not 2600 years). The fact that Lee could not see this, could not see the limits of Lysistrata to represent a new generation of voices (women like Marissa Johnson, Mara Willaford, Tia Oso, Patrisse Cullors) in the terms of a male-centric play and political program, means he does not really understand his times and how it has changed from the days of Malcolm X and the Black Panthers."

Keryce Chelsi Henry, writing for Nylon, pointed out the film’s hypocrisy when it comes to addressing its numerous themes, writing: "There’s a far greater issue that underlies the film, however, which is that Lee simultaneously satirizes and supports problematic stereotypes. He pokes fun at the Great White Savior™—John Cusack’s Father Corridan—by having him lead an entirely black congregation with generous use of “we” and “us,” but it is Corridan who is the most knowledgeable about institutionalized prejudices and experiences that don’t affect him firsthand. Lee also hypersexualizes the black women in the film as a jab at a society that does the same, but once the sex strike gains momentum, the idea that these women have the “power of the pussy” implies that their only power is in their pussy."

=== Accolades ===
Year	Association	Category	Nominee(s)	Result	Ref.
2015	AAFCA Awards	Best Independent Film	Chi-Raq	Won	
2015	AAFCA Awards	Best Actress	Teyonah Parris	Won	
2016	Black Reel Awards	Best Film	Chi-Raq	Nominated	
2016	Black Reel Awards	Best Director	Spike Lee	Nominated	
2016	Black Reel Awards	Best Screenplay, Adapted or Original	Spike Lee and Kevin Willmott	Nominated	
2016	Black Reel Awards	Best Actress	Teyonah Parris	Won	
2016	Black Reel Awards	Best Supporting Actress	Angela Bassett	Nominated	
2016	Black Reel Awards	Best Ensemble	Kim Coleman	Nominated	
2016	NAACP Image Awards	Outstanding Actress in a Motion Picture	Teyonah Parris	Nominated	
2016	NAACP Image Awards	Outstanding Supporting Actress in a Motion Picture	Angela Bassett	Nominated	
2016	NAACP Image Awards	Outstanding Supporting Actress in a Motion Picture	Jennifer Hudson	Nominated	

=== Controversies ===
The November film trailer was controversial. Criticism included an op-ed in the Chicago Tribune by emergency physician Amy Ho, who argued (before the film's release) that Chicago deaths occurring nightly in local hospitals were used for the purpose of entertainment. Critiques of a similar vein were published on Twitter and other social media sites.

The term "Chi-Raq" is a portmanteau of Chicago and Iraq, as well as an endonym used by some Chicago non-residents to liken the area to a war zone due to its high crime rates. City residents and city council members requested that Lee change the name of the film, and threatened to withhold tax credits that the filmmaker would receive from the city. Lee later called Chicago Mayor Rahm Emanuel a "bully" and several Chicago aldermen "bootlickers" for their criticisms.

The film's production received more negative press when it was discovered that its music supervisor Thomas "DJ Slugo" Kendricks was charging artists a submission fee in order to have their music considered for the soundtrack. These measures were taken to the film's production team, and Kendricks was fired.

== See also ==
- List of black films of the 2010s
- List of hood films
