= Always a Bridesmaid =

Always a Bridesmaid may refer to:

- Always a Bridesmaid (1943 film), American film by Erle C. Kenton
- Always a Bridesmaid (2019 film), American romantic comedy film by Trey Haley

== See also ==
- "Always the Bridesmaid", a series of three singles by The Decemberists
