= Kellie Shanygne Williams =

American actress

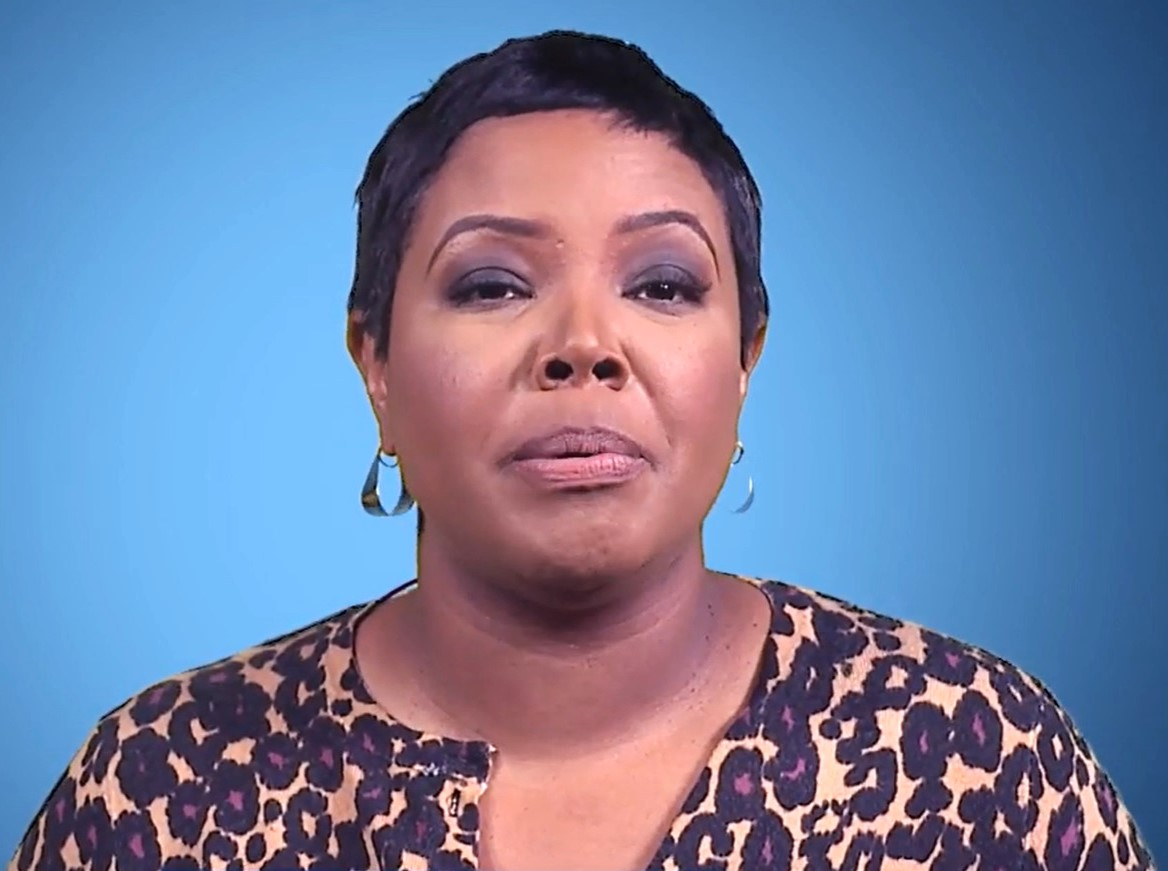
- Williams in 2019
- Born: March 22, 1976 (age 50); Washington, D.C., U.S.
- Other name: Kellie Jackson
- Occupation: Actress
- Years active: 1989–present
- Known for: Laura Winslow – Family Matters
- Spouse: Hannibal Jackson (m. 2009)
- Children: 2

Kellie Shanygne Williams-Jackson (née Williams; born March 22, 1976) is an American actress. She is best known for her role as Laura Lee Winslow, the middle-born child of Carl and Harriette Winslow on the ABC/CBS television series Family Matters which ran from 1989–1998. She is also known for her role as Tuesday in Millicent Shelton's 1998 film Ride.

== Early life and career ==
Jackson was born in Washington, D.C. as Kellie Shanygne Williams. After Family Matters, she began acting in the ABC television show What About Joan. In 1996, she had a recurring role as Charisse J. Mitchell on the hit UPN sitcom Moesha, and later Michelle, Nikki's rival, in The Parkers. In 2006, Williams reunited with her former Family Matters co-star Darius McCrary on the UPN sitcom Eve for two episodes "Separate, But Unequal" and the final cliffhanger episode "Daughter Don't Preach" as Lynn. She was also on the Style Network program Clean House for six episodes in 2009, as a substitute host for Niecy Nash.

In 2007, Jackson created the Kellie Williams Program with co-creator Jeff Rawluk in the Washington, D.C., area. The program will provide Washington, D.C., students between the ages of 14 and 20 an opportunity to produce a television show to air on Comcast Cable Local On-Demand. She stated, "I wanted to create a program similar to the one I grew up with (Howard University Children's Theatre). I wanted to bring it to the masses, not to just people who were familiar with the arts but to people who had never experienced any art."

== Personal life ==
On September 5, 2009, Williams married Hannibal Jackson at Ebenezer African Methodist Episcopal Church in Fort Washington, Maryland. The pair met in 2007, through a mutual friend.

They have two children together, daughter Hannah Belle Jackson (b. 2010) and son John Ervin Jackson (b. 2012).

== Filmography ==
=== Film ===
Year	Title	Role	Notes
2005	In the Mix	Cami	Credited as Kellie Williams
2009	Steppin: The Movie	CeeCee	
2010	Blessed & Cursed		
2011	Aide-de-Camp	Dedra	Short film
2020	Christmas in Carolina	Charlotte Saxon	
2022	A Family Matters Christmas	Kelis	Executive producer
2023	First Lady of BMF: The Tonesa Welch Story		

=== Television ===
Year	Title	Role	Notes
1989–1998	Family Matters	Laura Winslow	Main role; 215 episodes
1991	The ABC Saturday Morning Preview	Laura Winslow	
1993	ABC TGIF	Laura Winslow	2 episodes
1996–1998	Moesha	Charisse	2 episodes
1997	Oddville, MTV	Herself	1 episode
1998	Ride	Tuesday	Credited as Kellie Williams
1999	After All	Katie	Credited as Kellie Williams
2000–2001	What About Joan?	Alice Adams	Main role; 21 episodes
2002	Girlfriends	Cecily	Season 3, episode 8: "Handling Baggage"
2003	The Parkers	Michelle	Credited as Kellie Williams; Season 5, episode 10: "Cheaters Never Prosper"
2006	Eve	Lynn	Credited as Kellie Williams; 3 episodes
2009	Clean House	Herself	Guest host - 6 episodes
2024	The Ms. Pat Show	Lisa	Credited as Kellie Williams 1 episode
