= What About Joan? =

American sitcom

- Genre: Sitcom
- Created by: Gwen Macsai
- Written by: Paige Bernhardt; Chris Downey
- Directed by: Ed. Weinberger
- Starring: Joan Cusack; Kyle Chandler; Jessica Hecht; Donna Murphy; Kellie Shanygne Williams; Wallace Langham; Jeff Garlin
- Composer: James S. Levine
- Country of origin: United States
- Original language: English
- No. of seasons: 2
- No. of episodes: 21 (10 unaired)

Production
- Executive producers: James L. Brooks; David Richardson; Richard Sakai
- Producers: Josh Greene; Joan Cusack
- Editor: Deborah Gavlak
- Running time: 30 minutes
- Production companies: Gracie Films; Columbia TriStar Television

Original release
- Network: ABC
- Release: March 27 – October 9, 2001

What About Joan? is an American sitcom that aired on ABC for two seasons in 2001. It starred Joan Cusack as Joan Gallagher, a Chicago schoolteacher and the comedy of her day-to-day life. It co-starred Kyle Chandler. It was produced by James L. Brooks, Richard Sakai, David Richardson, and Ed. Weinberger.

== Synopsis ==
Joan Cusack played a high school teacher on the verge of a deepening relationship with Jake (Chandler). It was filmed before a live studio audience in Chicago and edited in Los Angeles. Joan's apartment was set in the Ravenswood neighborhood of Chicago's North Side.

== Cast ==
- Joan Cusack as Joan Gallagher
- Kyle Chandler as Jake Evans
- Jessica Hecht as Betsy Morgan (season 1)
- Donna Murphy as Dr. Ruby Stern
- Kellie Shanygne Williams as Alice Adams
- Wallace Langham as Mark Ludlow
- Phil Tyler as James

== Episodes ==
=== Series overview ===
Season	Episodes	Originally released	
Season	Episodes	First released	Last released
1	9	March 27, 2001	May 22, 2001
2	12	October 2, 2001	October 9, 2001

=== Season 1 (2001) ===
No. overall	No. in season	Title	Directed by	Written by	Original release date	Prod. code	U.S. viewers (millions)
1	1	"Pilot"	Michael Lembeck	Gwen Macsai	March 27, 2001	101	14.92
2	2	"Sex Talk"	Michael Lembeck	Gwen Macsai	April 3, 2001	102	13.06
3	3	"The Proposal"	Lee Shallat Chemel	Story by : Robin Epstein & David Richardson; Teleplay by : David Richardson	April 10, 2001	106	11.05
4	4	"Joan Meets the Parents"	Lee Shallat-Chemel	Jon Vitti	April 17, 2001	108	11.06
5	5	"Free Speech"	Ed. Weinberger	Michael Price & Chris Downey	April 24, 2001	113	11.33
6	6	"Joan's Sister Visits"	Michael Lembeck	Jon Vitti	May 1, 2001	104	10.22
7	7	"Maeve"	Lee Shallat-Chemel	Gwen Macsai	May 8, 2001	107	10.60
8	8	"Ruby Doobie Doo"	Lee Shallat-Chemel	Gwen Macsai & Robin Epstein	May 15, 2001	111	7.97
9	9	"Betsy's Wedding"	Ed. Weinberger	Jon Vitti	May 22, 2001	110	9.22

=== Season 2 (2001) ===
No. overall	No. in season	Title	Directed by	Written by	Original release date	Prod. code	U.S. viewers (millions)
10	1	"My Dinner with Jake"	Terry Hughes	Katherine Green	October 2, 2001	201	8.70
11	2	"Quiet Time"	Unknown	Unknown	October 9, 2001	203	6.72
12	3	"Testing, Testing"	N/A	N/A	Unaired	204	N/A
13	4	"No Bar Is an Island"	N/A	N/A	Unaired	202	N/A
14	5	"Quid Pro Quo"	N/A	N/A	Unaired	105	N/A
15	6	"Joan Sets Up Alice"	N/A	N/A	Unaired	109	N/A
16	7	"The Curse of the Sweater"	N/A	N/A	Unaired	112	N/A
17	8	"Mr. Roboto"	N/A	N/A	Unaired	103	N/A
18	9	"It's a Mad, Mad, Mad, Mad Joan"	N/A	N/A	Unaired	205	N/A
19	10	"Green Bay"	N/A	N/A	Unaired	206	N/A
20	11	"You Can't Go Home Again"	N/A	N/A	Unaired	207	N/A
21	12	"Jake's Dilemma"	N/A	N/A	Unaired	208	N/A
