= Palm Royale =

2024 comedy-drama television series

- Promotional poster
- Genre: Period comedy drama
- Created by: Abe Sylvia
- Based on: Mr. & Mrs. American Pie by Juliet McDaniel
- Starring: Kristen Wiig; Ricky Martin; Josh Lucas; Leslie Bibb; Amber Chardae Robinson; Laura Dern; Allison Janney; Carol Burnett; Kaia Gerber
- Theme music composer: Jeff Toyne
- Countries of origin: United States; Canada
- Original language: English
- No. of seasons: 2
- No. of episodes: 20

Production
- Executive producers: Laura Dern; Jayme Lemons; Katie O'Connell Marsh; John Norris; Abe Sylvia; Tate Taylor; Kristen Wiig; Sharr White; Sheri Holman
- Production companies: Jaywalker Pictures; Aunt Sylvia's Moving Picture co.; Wyolah Entertainment; Boat Rocker Media; Inkshares; Apple Studios

Original release
- Network: Apple TV+
- Release: March 20 – May 8, 2024
- Network: Apple TV
- Release: November 12, 2025 – January 14, 2026

Palm Royale is a period comedy-drama television series created by Abe Sylvia. It is based on 2018 novel Mr. & Mrs. American Pie by Juliet McDaniel. The series premiered on March 20, 2024, on Apple TV+. The second season premiered on November 12, 2025. In March 2026, the series was cancelled after its second season.

== Premise ==
Set in 1969, outsider Maxine Dellacorte-Simmons (Kristen Wiig) strives to attain a place in the high society of Palm Beach, Florida, through the town's most exclusive country club, the Palm Royale, in the process learning what she will and won't do to achieve this.

== Cast and characters ==
=== Main ===
- Kristen Wiig as Maxine Dellacorte-Simmons
- Ricky Martin as Robert Diaz
- Josh Lucas as Douglas Darby Dellacorte-Simmons
- Leslie Bibb as Dinah Donahue
- Amber Chardae Robinson as Virginia
- Laura Dern as Linda Shaw/Penelope Rollins
- Allison Janney as Evelyn Rollins
- Carol Burnett as Norma Dellacorte
- Kaia Gerber as Mitzi (season 2; recurring season 1)

=== Recurring ===
- Bruce Dern as Skeet Rollins
- Julia Duffy as Mary Meredith Jones Davidsoul
- Claudia Ferri as Raquel Kimberly-Marco
- Jordan Bridges as Perry Donahue, Ambassador to Luxembourg
- Dominic Burgess as Grayman
- Jason Canela as Eddie
- James Urbaniak as Palm Royale Manager
- Mindy Cohn as Ann Holiday
- Ben Palacios as Prince of Luxembourg / Reginald Baggins
- Aqueela Zoll as Princess Stephanie of Luxembourg
- Crosby Fitzgerald as Sylvia
- Bellina Logan as Rita
- Wesley Mann as Benny Barnhill
- Rick Cosnett as Sergeant Tom Sanka
- Roberto Sanchez as Pinky
- Avi Rothman as Astronaut Grant Herkimer
- Michael Hitchcock as Chester
- Adam J. Harrington as Agent Stevens
- Richard Whiten as Agent Clune
- Albert Malafronte as Dr. Prescott
- Patti LuPone as Marjorie Merriweather Post
- Ryan Dorsey as Jedebedaiah
- John Stamos as Dr. Dusty Magic
- Vicki Lawrence as Lotte

== Episodes ==
=== Series overview ===
Season	Episodes	Originally released	
Season	Episodes	First released	Last released
1	10	March 20, 2024	May 8, 2024
2	10	November 12, 2025	January 14, 2026

=== Season 1 (2024) ===
No. overall	No. in season	Title	Directed by	Teleplay by	Original release date
1	1	"Maxine Goes to Palm Beach"	Tate Taylor	Abe Sylvia	March 20, 2024
In 1969, social-climbing Maxine is determined to join the ranks of high society in Palm Beach, Florida. Sneaking into the Palm Royale country club, she attempts to befriend socialites Mary, Raquel, and rivals Dinah and Evelyn, whom she has admired from "The Shiny Sheet", but she is escorted out by the bartender Robert, a Korean War veteran. Maxine crosses paths with women's liberationist Linda, and stages a fender-bender to ingratiate herself to Dinah. Rejecting Maxine for her dated wardrobe — pilfered from her comatose aunt-in-law, wealthy Norma Dellacorte — Dinah confides that she is pregnant with the child of her lover Eddie, the club's tennis pro. Maxine arranges an abortion for her with Linda's help, but Dinah refuses to sponsor Maxine's membership to the Palm Royale, accusing her of lying about her connection to the Dellacortes. In retaliation, Maxine spreads rumors and is confronted by Dinah, who realizes Maxine's husband Douglas really is Norma's nephew and heir-apparent to her fortune. Maxine blackmails Dinah into sponsoring her, while Evelyn denounces Maxine for tricking Douglas into marrying her.
2	2	"Maxine Saves a Cat"	Tate Taylor	Sheri Holman	March 20, 2024
Pawning Norma's jewelry to fund her new lifestyle, Maxine needs two more sponsors to become a full Palm Royale member, and donates $10,000 to Mary's charity auction in exchange for sponsorship. Dinah is furious when Maxine catches the eye of both Eddie and her husband Perry, Nixon's ambassador to Luxembourg. Despite Evelyn's hostility, Maxine befriends Ann, the new society columnist, and learns that Linda is Evelyn's estranged stepdaughter, born Penelope Rollins. Accompanying Linda to a feminist collective meeting led by fellow activist Virginia, Maxine suggests that she, like their movement, is disrupting society from the inside. Stealing a statuette of Bastet for the auction from Norma's disused mansion, Maxine discovers Robert living there. She inadvertently reignites Dinah's affair with Eddie, and Ann identifies the statuette as a rare artifact, resulting in Maxine bidding $75,000 to keep it from Evelyn. Maxine reveals to Linda that Douglas married her when she was pregnant, but lost the baby, leading Norma and others to believe she lied to trap him. Linda kindly signs on as Maxine's third sponsor, while Robert visits Norma, who shows signs of reawakening.
3	3	"Maxine's Like a Dellacorte"	Abe Sylvia	Sharr White	March 20, 2024
Though Maxine is evicted from her motel for nonpayment, her auction escapades land her on the coveted front page of the Shiny Sheet. When a jealous Dinah forces her to host a cocktail party, Maxine moves herself into Norma's mansion, but Robert — revealed to be Norma's longtime companion and caretaker — refuses to leave. In a surprise interview with Ann, Maxine agrees to organize Norma's annual "Beach Ball", Palm Beach's most exclusive event, for its 50th year. She enlists Linda's talent for elaborate table-setting, and Linda explains that the town's "charity" events only benefit the wealthy hosts. While Linda enjoys a drink with Robert, Maxine struggles with cocktail orders and condescension from Mary, Raquel, Evelyn, and Dinah as they interrogate her plans for the highly anticipated Beach Ball. Alone with Maxine, Evelyn reveals that Norma refused to leave any of her estate to Douglas, and Maxine admits that she has no money, but coerces Evelyn into joining forces. Maxine and Douglas consummate their new home, unaware Linda has taken Norma's Rolodex of influential guests, essential to the Beach Ball's success.
4	4	"Maxine Rolls the Dice"	Abe Sylvia	Becky Mode	March 27, 2024
Maxine conceals her financial troubles from Douglas, including mounting debts from bad checks, but he quits his career as a pilot. Robert petitions for legal conservatorship of Norma's estate, and Linda admits that she stole the Rolodex to conceal a damaging secret, introducing Robert to her ailing father Skeet, a millionaire-turned-hippie residing at Norma's care facility. At Raquel's gala, Maxine realizes her mobster husband Pinky gave her one of Norma's pawned necklaces, and Mary confronts Maxine about her bounced check. Robert takes back the stolen necklace, but Maxine frames him as the thief and is named Norma's conservator instead. Moving Norma back to her mansion, Maxine tells Douglas he was disinherited, but they now control his aunt's money while she is alive. Having confided to Linda that he is gay, Robert comes to stay at Virginia's feminist bookstore, and Linda removes a card from the Rolodex accusing her of attempted murder. Searching Norma's safety deposit boxes for the missing Rolodex, Maxine finds a shocking wedding invitation and a gun from Norma's collection. She rushes home to find Norma awake, but unable to communicate.
5	5	"Maxine Shakes the Tree"	Stephanie Laing	Emma Rathbone	April 3, 2024
Faced with the invitation, Douglas admits that he and Linda were engaged twenty years earlier, until she shot her father on their wedding day. Maxine attempts to confront Linda, but Virginia turns her away. Newspaper archives reveal the circumstances of the shooting were unclear, but Evelyn believes she was Linda's true target, warning Maxine that the gun must stay hidden. Linda and Virginia inform their collective that the Rolodex is actually Norma's catalogue of blackmail. They agree to test its influence by targeting Perry, who convinces Douglas to invest in his real estate scheme. Dinah drunkenly urges Maxine to pursue an affair with Robert, who declines her advances, while Ann discovers discrepancies in Maxine's personal history. After confronting Douglas, Linda tells Maxine the truth: she meant to shoot Douglas, who was cheating on her with Maxine, but wounded Skeet by mistake, and Norma covered up the incident. Linda burns the Rolodex in front of Norma, and Maxine tosses the gun in the ocean, hoping to put the past behind her.
6	6	"Maxine Takes a Step"	Stephanie Laing	Celeste Hughey	April 10, 2024
On a tour of NASA, Maxine informs Evelyn that the Rolodex and gun are gone, much to Evelyn's fury. In need of a glamorous guest to encourage attendance at the Beach Ball, Maxine hopes to invite the Prince of Luxembourg, Douglas and Perry's new business partner. She lets slip to Dinah that Perry is sleeping with her manicurist Mitzi, and confronts Robert, who admits that he is gay. Even without the gun, which Norma used as leverage against Linda to force Skeet to marry Evelyn, he has no intention of divorcing her. As Palm Beach celebrates the Apollo 12 launch, the Prince and Princess decline Maxine's invitation, and Evelyn warns that Norma's blackmail kept the rich and powerful in line. Virginia and her comrades expose Perry as a fraud, and Maxine admits to Ann that she used aliases from the Shiny Sheet to escape her past as a poor orphan. Robert presents Maxine with Norma's already prepared Beach Ball invitations, containing veiled threats to attend, and Maxine mails them out. Robert and the Prince begin an affair, and Skeet dies peacefully during an LSD trip with Linda.
7	7	"Maxine Bags a Prince"	Abe Sylvia	Logan Faust & Sheri Holman	April 17, 2024
As Palm Beach high society gathers for Skeet's funeral, Norma plots to shoot Maxine. Perry is arrested, jeopardizing Douglas, whose investment in Perry and the Prince's scheme has drained Norma's accounts. Dinah turns against Maxine, angling to find herself a new husband. At Linda's behest, her fellow activists steal valuables from the Rollins mansion to fund their mission. Desperate not to be photographed, the Princess seizes Ann's camera, and Maxine and Norma walk in on Robert in bed with the Prince. Mary demands payment from Maxine, and they are forced to help a pregnant activist deliver her baby in the bathtub. Maxine admits to Douglas that she lost their baby just before they were married, while Robert confiscates Norma's guns. Skeet changed his will to name Linda his sole heir, and Douglas is taken by Police Sergeant Tom Sanka for questioning. Now Robert's friend, Maxine recognizes the "Prince" on a wanted poster as con man Reginald Baggins. Realizing he and the "Princess" are frauds, she gives Reginald up to Tom in exchange for Douglas's release.
8	8	"Maxine Saves the Whale"	Claire Scanlon	Sharr White	April 24, 2024
A heartbroken Robert believes the Prince abandoned him, and a whale is stranded on the Dellacorte beach, where the Beach Ball will soon be held. Newly radicalized, Mary joins Virginia's collective in helping draft dodgers escape to Canada, while Linda refuses to leave her bedroom, blaming herself for her father's death. Evelyn is drawn to the whale, and Dinah has found a wealthy 90-year-old boyfriend, Axel, who once loved Norma. Planning to open an inclusive new club with Pinky, Douglas demands an "investment" from Linda to keep him from helping Evelyn blackmail her. A chance encounter with Tom at a gay bar leads Robert to realize Maxine had the Prince arrested. While he confronts her, Norma drugs Maxine's grasshopper cocktail, which Ann drinks instead. Crashing Dinah's party aboard Axel's yacht with Norma, Maxine imitates whale song and draws the beached whale back to the ocean, as the lonely Evelyn shares a kiss with the jilted Eddie. Douglas meets with Robert, who has discovered his affair with Mitzi, but they are arrested when the bar is raided. Unnoticed by the other guests, Norma knocks Maxine overboard.
9	9	"Maxine Makes a Splash"	Claire Scanlon	Kelly Hutchinson	May 1, 2024
Adrift at sea, Maxine is rescued when astronaut Major Herkimer splashes down nearby, and invites him to the Beach Ball. Axel proposes to Dinah, while Eddie, sick of being Dinah's shameful secret, begins a romance with Evelyn. Mitzi bails out Douglas and Robert, and Ann is rushed to the hospital. President Nixon will be attending the Beach Ball to congratulate Herkimer, and Maxine and Douglas are questioned by the Secret Service. Evelyn strong-arms Maxine into making her co-chair of the Beach Ball, and Linda urges Robert to let go of the guilt that has kept him by Norma's side. Stealing the Bastet statuette, Mary escapes when Virginia and her fellow activists are arrested. Linda is shocked by Mary's suggestion that they assassinate the president, and Mary knocks her unconscious. Helping Maxine prepare a musical number for the Beach Ball, Herkimer kisses her, but she remains committed to Douglas, despite his plan to turn the Dellacorte mansion into the new club. Ann awakens, Evelyn invites Eddie as her date to the Beach Ball, and Robert discovers a recovered Norma has a secret plan.
10	10	"Maxine Throws a Party"	Tate Taylor	Sheri Holman & Kelly Hutchinson	May 8, 2024
As the upper crust of Palm Beach arrive for the Beach Ball, Norma offers to marry Robert to leave him her estate. Herkimer has left, but Maxine persuades Robert to don his spacesuit and pose as the astronaut. Struggling to keep peace between Evelyn and Dinah, Maxine agrees to let the mansion become Douglas and Pinky's new club. Dinah is surprised to see Perry, who has been paroled by the president to spy on Axel, a top Democratic donor. Robert shares a kiss with the married Tom. Virginia finds Linda locked in the wine cellar by Mary, and they are freed by Evelyn after Linda promises to share the Rollins estate. Manipulated by Norma, Maxine urges the pregnant Mitzi to confront her baby's father, realizing too late it is Douglas. In front of Nixon and the other guests, a brutally honest Maxine exposes her fellow socialites' secrets, as well as her own. Mary attempts to shoot Nixon, but Linda intervenes and Robert, who has deduced that Norma is not who she appears to be, is shot instead.

=== Season 2 (2025–26) ===
No. overall	No. in season	Title	Directed by	Written by	Original release date
11	1	"Maxine Drinks Martinis Now"	Abe Sylvia	Abe Sylvia & Sharr White	November 12, 2025
In the aftermath of the disastrous Beach Ball, Maxine is temporarily institutionalized, believing she is at the Palm Royale. Linda is mistaken for the would-be assassin by Tom and arrested, but Virginia has her institutionalized to protect her, revealing she is an undercover FBI agent. Norma is restored as the grande dame of Palm Beach, and Evelyn reclaims the Rollins mansion with Eddie. With Linda's encouragement, Maxine escapes the facility and finds a comatose Robert at the hospital, hiding when Norma arrives. Realizing that Norma wants her dead, Maxine is returned to the facility but warns Douglas. Discovering Mary hiding in the mansion's bootlegger tunnels, Evelyn promises to protect her, while Linda refuses to help Norma frame Maxine. Still in love with Perry, Dinah finds Axel dead, secretly murdered by Norma to conceal her own past, and Robert reawakens. Pressured by Norma to divorce Maxine and marry Mitzi — allowing their child to unlock the considerable Dellacorte generation-skipping trust — Douglas fails to bring Maxine home. She calls Evelyn instead, becoming unlikely allies against the rest of Palm Beach high society.
12	2	"Maxine Serves a Swerve"	Abe Sylvia	Sheri Holman & Becky Mode	November 19, 2025
To secure her freedom, Linda provides Maxine with blackmail material against powerful officials, and gives her control of the Rollins estate. Learning of the $82 million Dellacorte trust, Maxine spitefully serves Douglas with divorce papers. Dinah has already inherited Axel's estate and reunites with Perry, while Evelyn and Eddie are happily wed. Having given Douglas the blackmail information by mistake, Maxine enlists Ann and Virginia's help, but Douglas gives Perry the documents to look over. Spotting Mary, Maxine chases her into the tunnels connecting to the Palm Royale, and emerges at the Dellacorte mansion, grappling with Douglas's decision to marry Mitzi. Perry gives the damaging documents to the Secret Service, who instruct him to kill Linda. Instead, Dinah and the collective break Linda out, swapping her with Axel's corpse, and Maxine and Linda flee into the tunnels. They encounter Mary, Ann, and Virginia, who help them escape, and Douglas flies Linda to Cuba. Hiding at the Palm Royale's secret apartment for disgraced socialites, Maxine is surprised to find a portrait of Douglas's mother, while Norma has a recovering Robert moved to her mansion.
13	3	"Maxine Solves a Murder"	Stephanie Laing	Celeste Hughey & Emma Rathbone	November 26, 2025
Robert informs "Norma" that he knows she killed Axel to preserve her darkest secret: at boarding school, the real Norma Dellacorte died in an accident and a nun, Sister Lotte, had Norma's diabetic roommate Agnes assume her identity for a better life; Axel was in love with the real Norma before she left for school. Federal agents descend on the Rollins mansion in search of Linda, leaving Mary a free woman, and Douglas asks Maxine to return her engagement ring, which she accidentally swallows. Allowing Evelyn to blame Norma for Linda's escape, Maxine recruits Dinah and Ann to help Evelyn withdraw her assets before they can be seized. Maxine and Evelyn share their suspicions with Virginia that Norma murdered various Dellacortes to secure their fortune for herself. With Douglas and her friends' help, Maxine uses Mitzi's ritual initiation into the Dellacorte family to steal the key to Norma's safety deposit box. Norma has already removed the trophies kept from deceased relatives, but Maxine finds them hidden in the mansion's trophy room. She confronts Norma, who frames Maxine for shooting at her and disappears.
14	4	"Maxine Unwrecks a Home"	Stephanie Laing	Kelly Hutchinson & Logan Faust	December 3, 2025
Promoted to the FBI, Tom accuses Maxine of murdering the missing Norma, but attorney/gynecologist Dr. Dusty Magic comes to her defense. Evelyn offers Sidonius, the Palm Royale's manager, financial rescue in exchange for her and Maxine receiving controlling interest in the club. Desperate to clear her name, Maxine realizes Norma used the tunnels to flee to Europe with Linda's cash. Tom's affair with Robert, who has inherited Norma's estate, strains Maxine and Robert's friendship. Maxine's attempt to compromise Tom by kissing him in front of the press backfires, but she chooses not to reveal his real affair to his wife. To buy out the Palm Royale, Evelyn needs the three founding families' agreement, but Perry and Douglas demand ownership for themselves. Instead, Evelyn secures signatures from the wives: Mary, who holds a séance to ask her late husband; Dinah, whom Evelyn blackmails with her scandalous love letters to Eddie; and Mitzi, who elopes with Douglas but demands a lavish wedding. Hiding from Pinky in the wake of their failed partnership, Douglas is kidnapped. Maxine discovers her engagement ring is engraved with Agnes's name, and reconciles with Robert, who reveals the truth about "Norma".
15	5	"Maxine Is Ready to Single Mingle"	Abe Sylvia	Sharr White	December 10, 2025
Embracing revolutionary life in Cuba with Che Guevara's half-brother, Linda radios Maxine for money to fund her cause. Evelyn and Maxine attempt to buy the club using gold bars, but Sidonius demands cash. Maxine is charmed by Dusty, now her lawyer and romantic prospect, assuring him that her marriage is over. He arranges for her and Evelyn to sell the gold to Marjorie Merriweather Post, who has also acquired Evelyn's impounded possessions. Realizing Maxine has been helping Linda, Evelyn ends their friendship and declares sole ownership of the Palm Royale, while Dusty reveals himself as Linda's courier. Believing Raquel and Pinky have abducted Douglas, Perry attempts to rescue him while Mitzi informs Tom, interrupting his tryst with Robert, who warns Maxine. Per Nixon's instructions, Dinah arranges for Perry to run for mayor as a Democrat to ensure a Republican victory. Maxine and Robert give Pinky the Dellacorte mansion to save Douglas, only to learn he was actually being questioned by the Secret Service about Linda. Finding Maxine in an inadvertently compromising position with Douglas, Dusty departs. Joining Tom at a gay motel, Robert is surprised to see Reginald.
16	6	"Maxine Finds Herself"	Stephanie Laing	Sheri Holman & Emma Rathbone	December 17, 2025
Journeying to Moscow, Linda takes on a new identity and lover, Rudolf Nureyev's half-cousin. Pinky is working for a Soviet spy, and Virginia recruits Maxine and Douglas to uncover the mole. Maxine is shocked to meet Mirabelle, her long-lost twin sister, while Evelyn takes over as proprietor of the Palm Royale, forced to pay Pinky's protection racket. At her bridal/baby shower, Mitzi learns Douglas has named Raquel and Pinky the baby's godparents, and promised Maxine half of the trust. Raquel realizes Douglas and Maxine know about the mole, but Mirabelle subdues her after a brawl throughout the mansion. Tom leaves Robert, fearing Reginald will expose his secret after the con man is arrested with a copy of Mirabelle's criminal record. Maxine makes amends with Evelyn, convincing her they can prove Raquel and Pinky are guilty of tax evasion, while a vengeful Norma returns to Palm Beach. Seducing Douglas when he mistakes her for her sister, Mirabelle comes clean to Maxine, explaining that Reginald arranged for them to meet. She assures Maxine that Douglas still loves her, giving her Pinky's incriminating ledger. A gunshot soon rings out, and Mirabelle is found dead in the Palm Royale's pool.
17	7	"Maxine Plays Dead"	Abe Sylvia	Logan Faust & Becky Mode	December 24, 2025
To keep Maxine safe from Norma, Virginia allows Douglas and the public to believe Maxine was killed instead. When Evelyn, Dinah, and Ann recognize that Mirabelle's body is not their friend, they are placed in hiding with Maxine at Robert's motel. While a devastated Robert learns that Tom has been transferred, Maxine befriends fellow guest Bruce, Rock Hudson's lover. Perry and Dinah are terrified by death threats they assume are from the fugitive Norma, who is forcing Mary to shelter her, but they were actually sent by Marjorie; furious with Dinah for interfering with her relationship with Nixon, Marjorie demands Axel's fabergé egg. Desperate to witness her own funeral, Maxine hides in the empty coffin and bursts out to confront Norma, but it is actually Bruce in disguise to see Hudson. At odds with Eddie after the IRS close the Palm Royale until $8 million in back taxes are paid, Evelyn sleeps with her employee, Jed. Spreading Mirabelle's ashes in the motel jacuzzi, Maxine kisses Douglas and agrees to accompany him to Switzerland, where Robert has joined Norma on the run.
18	8	"Maxine Hits the Slopes"	Abe Sylvia	Teleplay by : Abe Sylvia & Kelly Hutchinson; Story by : Kelly Hutchinson	December 31, 2025
The Palm Beach set jets off to Switzerland, with Virginia and Ann hunting for Norma, Dinah and Perry seeking the fabergé egg, and Evelyn and Eddie taking their honeymoon. Though Maxine joins Douglas and Mitzi to sign away her claim to the Dellacorte trust, she and Douglas secretly reconcile. At Norma's former boarding school, now her grand hotel run by Lotte, the travelers are welcomed by Robert, whom Norma has legally adopted as a Dellacorte. Discovering that it is actually Linda who must renounce her claim, Maxine enlists pilots Beullah and Ulla to fetch her. Virginia confides in Ann about the Soviet mole, and they, Maxine, and Douglas find Agnes's grave, realizing the real Norma is buried there and that Lotte is Agnes's mother. Norma arranges for Mitzi to annul her marriage to Douglas and marry Robert instead to unlock the trust. Deducing that Jed is the father of Mitzi's baby, Evelyn confesses her infidelity to Eddie. A mixup results in Robert burning letters proving Norma's true identity, while Maxine discovers letters to Robert from his estranged child, but Douglas collapses after a drink provided by Lotte.
19	9	"Maxine Hears a Confession"	Stephanie Laing	Sheri Holman	January 7, 2026
A doctor determines that Douglas was not poisoned, but suffers from a congenital heart defect preventing him from fathering children. While Jed tries to seduce Mary into adding him to her will, Mitzi is no longer willing to help him con their way into the Dellacorte trust, and returns home with a heartbroken Eddie. Linda arrives just in time to save the trust from being seized by the Swiss government. Maxine realizes that Douglas's hereditary condition led all the Dellacortes to die young; Norma did not kill them, but outliving them proves she is not a Dellacorte. Never truly accepted by Norma, Robert reconciles with Maxine, who discovers that Norma bribed Evelyn to distract them. Norma reveals to Linda that she is her daughter, the child of her affair with Skeet. A delirious Perry tries to capture the fugitive Linda, who escapes with Norma and Lotte. Maxine denounces Evelyn and everyone returns to Palm Beach, where Robert welcomes his son, Rafael. Mitzi informs Maxine that Jed, in an effort to keep Maxine from taking half of the trust, killed Mirabelle. Jed attempts to kill Evelyn, but is shot by Maxine.
20	10	"Maxine Does Something Good"	Stephanie Laing	Teleplay by : Abe Sylvia & Sharr White; Story by : Sharr White	January 14, 2026
Maxine and Evelyn attempt to dispose of Jed's body, but when Douglas suggests waiting to reconcile until the baby turns 18, Maxine angrily reveals that he is not the father. Dinah discovers the fabergé egg among Norma's trophies, giving it to Marjorie in exchange for making Perry mayor. Realizing the FBI have blackmailed Tom into assassinating the mole, who has framed Perry, Maxine and her friends trick Tom into shooting Jed's corpse instead. Douglas calls off his wedding to Mitzi, but Maxine refuses his furious demand to return to their old life. Making amends with Norma, Maxine generously marries Robert to help him gain custody of his son; Evelyn informs Eddie that she wants her independence; Dinah chooses to stay with Perry; Mitzi leaves with Eddie; and a grateful Norma disappears. With Rafael legally a Dellacorte born to a "legitimate marriage", Robert and Maxine win the trust and share the wealth with Eddie and Mitzi, who gives birth to her child. Marjorie, the real mole, remains at large, while Rafael may not be who he appears to be, and Evelyn and Maxine reopen the Palm Royale, as Linda and Norma reconnect in Paris.

== Production ==
It was announced in February 2022 that Apple TV+ had given a greenlight to a 10-part series, Mrs. American Pie, which would star Kristen Wiig, with Laura Dern executive producing and potentially co-starring. Abe Sylvia would write the series with Tate Taylor directing. In May, Allison Janney, Leslie Bibb, Ricky Martin, and Josh Lucas were added to the cast. Carol Burnett, Amber Chardae Robinson, Jordan Bridges, Kaia Gerber, and Julia Duffy were among additional castings announced in June.

The show's development team made plot and writing decisions based on the cast.

Filming began in May 2022.

The show was renamed Palm Royale in April 2023.

On June 6, 2024, it was announced that the show had been renewed for a second season. Filming on the second season started on October 9, 2024. On March 2, 2026, it was announced that the show was cancelled after two seasons.

== Release ==
Palm Royale premiered on March 20, 2024, with the first three episodes on Apple TV+. The 10-episode second season premiered on November 12, 2025, with a new episode dropping weekly until January 14, 2026.

== Reception ==
=== Critical response ===
Critical response of Palm Royale
Season	Rotten Tomatoes	Metacritic
1	56% (68 reviews)	57 (32 reviews)
2	64% (11 reviews)	69 (7 reviews)

==== Season 1 ====
The review aggregator Rotten Tomatoes reported a 56% approval rating for the first season based on 68 critic reviews, with an average rating of 5.8/10. The website's critics consensus reads, "Palm Royale's fabulous cast and visual splendor make for a diverting enough destination, but its wayward tone results in a curiously unfulfilling trip to paradise." Metacritic assigned a score of 57 out of 100 based on 32 critics, indicating "mixed or average reviews".

==== Season 2 ====
On Rotten Tomatoes, the second season has a 64% approval rating, based on 11 critic reviews, with an average rating or 6.3/10. Metacritic assigned a score of 69 out of 100 based on 7 critics, indicating "generally favorable" reviews.

=== Accolades ===
Award	Date of ceremony	Category	Recipient(s) and nominee(s)	Result	Ref.
Actor Awards	March 1, 2026	Outstanding Performance by a Female Actor in a Comedy Series	Kristen Wiig	Nominated	
Art Directors Guild Awards	February 15, 2025	Excellence in Production Design for a One-Hour Period Single-Camera Series	Jon Carlos (for "Maxine's Like a Dellacorte")	Nominated	
Art Directors Guild Awards	February 28, 2026	Excellence in Production Design for a One-Hour Period Single-Camera Series	Jon Carlos (for "Maxine Drinks Martini's Now"; "Maxine Serves a Swerve")	Won	
Astra TV Awards	December 8, 2024	Best Streaming Comedy Series	Palm Royale	Nominated	
Astra TV Awards	December 8, 2024	Best Actress in a Streaming Comedy Series	Kristen Wiig	Nominated	
Astra TV Awards	December 8, 2024	Best Supporting Actor in a Streaming Comedy Series	Ricky Martin	Nominated	
Astra TV Awards	December 8, 2024	Best Supporting Actress in a Streaming Comedy Series	Laura Dern	Nominated	
Astra TV Awards	December 8, 2024	Best Supporting Actress in a Streaming Comedy Series	Allison Janney	Nominated	
Astra TV Awards	December 8, 2024	Best Directing in a Streaming Comedy Series	Tate Taylor (for "Maxine Goes to Palm Beach")	Nominated	
Astra TV Awards	December 8, 2024	Best Writing in a Streaming Comedy Series	Abe Sylvia (for "Maxine Goes to Palm Beach")	Nominated	
Artios Awards	February 12, 2025	Outstanding Achievement in Casting – Television Pilot and First Season Comedy	Kerry Barden, Paul Schnee, Roya Semnanian, Rachel Goldman	Won	
Costume Designers Guild Awards	February 6, 2025	Excellence in Period Television	Alix Friedberg and Leigh Ball (for "Maxine Throws a Party")	Nominated	
Costume Designers Guild Awards	February 12, 2026	Excellence in Period Television	Alix Friedberg and Leigh Ball (for "Maxine Is Ready to Single Mingle")	Won	
Costume Designers Guild Awards	February 12, 2026	Excellence in Costume Illustration	Oksana Nedavniaya	Nominated	
Critics' Choice Television Awards	January 12, 2025	Best Actress in a Comedy Series	Kristen Wiig	Nominated	
Hollywood Music in Media Awards	November 20, 2024	Main Title Theme – TV Show/Limited Series	Jeff Toyne	Nominated	
Hollywood Music in Media Awards	November 20, 2024	Music Supervision – Television	George Drakoulias & Ian Herbert	Nominated	
Hollywood Music in Media Awards	November 20, 2024	Soundtrack Album	Palm Royale	Nominated	
Gotham TV Awards	June 4, 2024	Outstanding Performance in a Comedy Series	Kristen Wiig	Nominated	
Make-Up Artists and Hair Stylists Guild Awards	February 15, 2025	Best Period and/or Character Make-Up in a Television Series, Television Limited or Miniseries or Television New Media Series	Tricia Sawyer, Marissa Lafayette, Marie Del Prete, Simone Almekias-Siegl, Marja Webster	Won	
Make-Up Artists and Hair Stylists Guild Awards	February 15, 2025	Best Period and/or Character Hair Styling in a Television Series, Television Limited or Miniseries or Television New Media Series	Karen Bartek, Brittany Madrigal, Frida Aradottir, Jill Crosby, Tiffany Bloom	Nominated	
Make-Up Artists and Hair Stylists Guild Awards	February 14, 2026	Best Period and/or Character Make-Up in a Television Series, Television Limited or Miniseries or Television New Media Series	Tricia Sawyer, Marissa Lafayette, Marie DelPrete, Rory Gaudio, Alyssa Goldberg	Won	
Make-Up Artists and Hair Stylists Guild Awards	February 14, 2026	Best Period and/or Character Hair Styling in a Television Series, Television Limited or Miniseries or Television New Media Series	Karen Bartek, Brittany Madrigal, Tiffany Bloom, Anna Quinn, Jill Crosby	Won	
Primetime Emmy Awards	September 15, 2024	Outstanding Comedy Series	Adam Gomolin, Rock Shaink, Sheri Holman, Sharr White, Tate Taylor, John Norris, Katie O'Connell Marsh, Kristen Wiig, Laura Dern, Jayme Lemons, Abe Sylvia, Becky Mode, Emma Rathbone, Celeste Hughey, Jesse Sternbaum, and Kelly Hutchinson	Nominated	
Primetime Emmy Awards	September 15, 2024	Outstanding Lead Actress in a Comedy Series	Kristen Wiig	Nominated	
Primetime Emmy Awards	September 15, 2024	Outstanding Supporting Actress in a Comedy Series	Carol Burnett	Nominated	
Primetime Creative Arts Emmy Awards	September 8, 2024	Outstanding Choreography for Scripted Programming	Brooke Lipton (for "Maxine's Entrance")	Nominated	
Primetime Creative Arts Emmy Awards	September 8, 2024	Outstanding Period Costumes	Alix Friedberg, Carolyn Dessert, Leigh Bell, Lindsay Newton, and Valerie Keiser (for "Maxine Throws a Party")	Nominated	
Primetime Creative Arts Emmy Awards	September 8, 2024	Outstanding Hairstyling	Karen Bartek, Brittany Madrigal, Cyndra Dunn, Tiffany Bloom, Frida Aradottir, and Jill Crosby (for "Maxine Rolls the Dice")	Nominated	
Primetime Creative Arts Emmy Awards	September 8, 2024	Outstanding Makeup (Non-Prosthetic)	Tricia Sawyer, Marissa Lafayette, Kenny Niederbaumer, Marie DelPrete, Simone Siegl, and Marja Webster (for "Pilot")	Nominated	
Primetime Creative Arts Emmy Awards	September 8, 2024	Outstanding Main Title Design	Ronnie Koff, Rob Slychuk, Nader Husseini, and Lexi Gunvaldson	Nominated	
Primetime Creative Arts Emmy Awards	September 8, 2024	Outstanding Music Composition for a Series	Jeff Toyne (for "Maxine Saves a Cat")	Nominated	
Primetime Creative Arts Emmy Awards	September 8, 2024	Outstanding Original Main Title Theme Music	Jeff Toyne	Won	
Primetime Creative Arts Emmy Awards	September 8, 2024	Outstanding Production Design for a Narrative Period or Fantasy Program (One Hour or More)	Jon Carlos, Mark Taylor, Amelia Brooke, and Ellen Reede (for "Maxine's Like a Dellacorte")	Nominated	
Primetime Creative Arts Emmy Awards	September 5–6, 2026	Outstanding Production Design for a Narrative Period or Fantasy Program (One Hour or More)	Jon Carlos, Rachel Aguirre, Amelia Brooke, Mark Robert Taylor, and Ellen Reede (for "Maxine Does Something Good")	Nominated	
Primetime Creative Arts Emmy Awards	September 5–6, 2026	Outstanding Choreography for Scripted Programming	Brooke Lipton (for "Comin' Home Baby" / "I Want to Be a Cowboy's Sweetheart" / "I Had a Ball")	Won	
Primetime Creative Arts Emmy Awards	September 5–6, 2026	Outstanding Period Costumes	Alix Friedberg, Samantha Schwartz, Jennifer Wolf, Leigh Bell, Carolyn Dessert, and Valerie Keiser (for "Maxine is Ready to Single Mingle")	Won	
Primetime Creative Arts Emmy Awards	September 5–6, 2026	Outstanding Period or Fantasy/Sci-Fi Hairstyling	Karen Bartek, Brittany Madrigal, Tiffany Bloom, Anna Quinn, Jill Crosby, and Frida Aradottir (for "Maxine Drinks Martinis Now")	Nominated	
Primetime Creative Arts Emmy Awards	September 5–6, 2026	Outstanding Period or Fantasy/Sci-Fi Makeup (Non-Prosthetic)	Tricia Sawyer, Marissa Lafayette, Marie DelPrete, Rory Gaudio, Alyssa Goldberg, Marja Webster, and Simone Almekias-Siegl (for "Maxine Drinks Martinis Now")	Won	
Primetime Creative Arts Emmy Awards	September 5–6, 2026	Outstanding Music Composition for a Series (Original Dramatic Score)	Jeff Toyne (for "Maxine Drinks Martinis Now")	Nominated	
Primetime Creative Arts Emmy Awards	September 5–6, 2026	Outstanding Stunt Coordination for Comedy Programming	Mallory Thompson (for "Maxine Finds Herself")	Nominated	
Primetime Creative Arts Emmy Awards	September 5–6, 2026	Outstanding Stunt Performance	Sonja Wajih and Colby Lemmo	Nominated	
Set Decorators Society of America Awards	August 5, 2024	Best Achievement in Décor/Design of a One Hour Period Series	Ellen Reede, Jonathan Carlos	Won	
