= Always a Bridesmaid (2019 film) =

2019 American romantic comedy film

- Film poster
- Directed by: Trey Haley
- Written by: Yvette Nicole Brown
- Produced by: ND Brown; Gregory Ramon Anderson; Veronica F. Nichols
- Starring: Javicia Leslie; Jordan Calloway; Yvette Nicole Brown; Michelle Mitchenor; Richard Lawson; Brandon Micheal Hall; Telma Hopkins; Affion Crockett
- Cinematography: Kenneth Stipe
- Edited by: MJ Whitaker
- Music by: Matthew Head
- Production companies: AAB Film; Tri Destined Studios; Little Brown Girl
- Distributed by: Black Waterhorse
- Release date: August 25, 2019 (BronzeLens Film Festival)
- Running time: 97 minutes
- Country: United States
- Language: English

Always a Bridesmaid is a 2019 American romantic comedy film directed by Trey Haley and written by Yvette Nicole Brown. The film stars Javicia Leslie, Jordan Calloway, Brown, Michelle Mitchenor, Richard Lawson, Brandon Micheal Hall, Telma Hopkins and Affion Crockett.

== Cast ==
- Javicia Leslie as Corina James-Randall
- Jordan Calloway as Mark Randall
- Yvette Nicole Brown as Pastor Althea Brody
- Michelle Mitchenor as Tamara Mickens
- Tosin Morohunfola as Bradley Mickens
- Marcel Spears as Carlton Blakeston Jr.
- Richard Lawson as Carlton Blakeston Sr.
- Bernard David Jones as Terrence
- Jasmin Brown as Denise Jenkins
- Amber Chardae Robinson as Janelle Devereaux
- Brandon Micheal Hall as Kenny
- Telma Hopkins as Ruby
- Affion Crockett as Dawson

== Reception ==
Barbara Shulgasser-Parker of Common Sense Media awarded the film two stars out of five.
