= Brandon Micheal Hall =

American actor (born 1993)

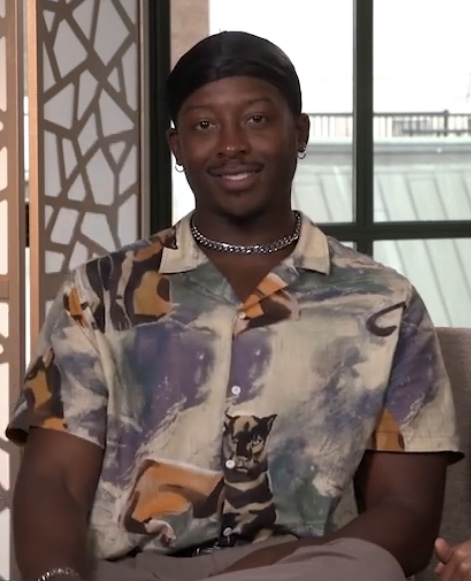
- Hall in 2022
- Born: February 3, 1993 (age 33); Anderson, South Carolina, U.S.
- Education: Juilliard School (BFA)
- Occupation: Actor
- Years active: 2015–present

Brandon Micheal Hall (born February 3, 1993) is an American actor. On television, he starred as the lead of the ABC sitcom The Mayor (2017) and the CBS comedy-drama God Friended Me (2018–2020). Hall also appeared as a series regular on the TBS / HBO Max dark comedy Search Party (2016–2022).

== Early life and education ==
Brandon Micheal Hall was born on February 3, 1993, in Anderson, South Carolina, and raised by his single mother, a minister.

He attended Pendleton High School for his freshman and sophomore years, before transferring to South Carolina Governor's School for the Arts & Humanities in Greenville. Hall went on to study drama at the Juilliard School in New York City, from which he graduated in 2015.

== Career ==
=== Film ===
Hall was in Cecile on the Phone (2017). He was in Monster Party (2018) and Lez Bomb (2018). Hall was in the romantic comedy film Always a Bridesmaid (2019) as Kenny directed by Trey Haley and written by Yvette Nicole Brown, her first screenplay.

=== Television ===
Hall was cast in the 2015 pilot for LFE, directed by David Slade, but the pilot did not receive a series order. A year later, Hall landed his first series regular role on the TBS dark comedy Search Party as Julius Marcus, a journalist and former boyfriend of series lead Dory Sief (Alia Shawkat). He appeared in the main cast for the first two seasons and was a guest star in the third and fourth seasons. Hall was subsequently cast in the title role of the ABC sitcom The Mayor in 2017, portraying an aspiring rapper who inadvertently becomes mayor of his hometown. The series received positive reviews, but was cancelled after one season.

In 2018, Hall was cast in the lead role of on the CBS comedy-drama God Friended Me. Hall portrayed Miles Finer, an outspoken atheist who helps people needing assistance after receiving a Facebook friend request from an individual identifying as God. It aired for two seasons before being cancelled in 2020.

=== Theatre ===
Hall made his Broadway debut on November 18, 2021, in Alice Childress's Trouble in Mind.

== Personal life ==
As of 2019 Hall was donating his time at least one Sunday a month with the group Hashtag Lunchbag Brooklyn, to make sandwiches for those less fortunate in Brooklyn.

== Filmography ==
=== Film ===
Year	Title	Role	Notes
2016	The Times	Daniel	Short film
2017	Cecile on the Phone	Donald	Short film
2018	Monster Party	Dodge	
2018	Lez Bomb	Austin	
2018	The Airport Run	Elijah	Short film
2019	Always a Bridesmaid	Kenny	
2020	The Surrogate	Nate	Feature film
2021	Injustice	Victor Stone / Cyborg	Voice; Direct-to-video
2023	The Young Wife	Ayman	
2024	Girl Haunts Boy	Mr Porter	
2024	Micro Budget	Garry	
2025	Audrey's Children	Dr. Brian Faust	Feature film

=== Television ===
Year	Title	Role	Notes
2015	LFE	Kevin	Unaired pilot
2016	Unforgettable	Officer Richie Gardner	Episode: "Shelter from the Storm" (S 4:Ep 9)
2016	Broad City	Delivery Guy	Episode: "Rat Pack" (S 3:Ep 4)
2016	The Characters	Rookie	Episode: "Paul W. Downs" (S 1:Ep 6)
2016–2021	Search Party	Julian Marcus	Main role (season 1–2); Guest (season 3-4)
2017	The Mayor	Courtney Rose	Main role
2018–2020	God Friended Me	Miles Finer	Main role
2020	Power	Carter	Episode: "Reversal of Fortune" (S 6:Ep 14)
2022	Chloe	Josh	BBC One TV series
2023	Poker Face	Damian	Episode: "The Night Shift" (S 1:Ep 2)
2026	Wizards Beyond Waverly Place	Damien Penwulf	Guest role (season 3)
