= Amasia Entertainment =

American entertainment company

- Type: Private
- Industry: Entertainment
- Founders: Michael A. Helfant; Bradley Gallo
- Headquarters: Los Angeles, California, U.S.
- Key people: Michael A. Helfant; Bradley Gallo
- Services: Film Production; Television Production
- Website: amasiaentertainment.com

Amasia Entertainment is a Los Angeles based entertainment company founded in 2012 by Michael A. Helfant and Bradley Gallo. It specializes in film and television production.

Prior to forming Amasia, Helfant co-founded Troika Pictures, where Gallo served as the Head of Production and Development.

Previously, Helfant served as President/COO of Marvel Studios, overseeing live-action and animation productions and helping to launch the first slate of Marvel self-financed films including Iron Man and The Incredible Hulk; COO of Beacon Pictures; Senior EVP of Miramax/Dimension Films; EVP/Head of Business Operations and Acquisitions at Interscope Communications/PolyGram Filmed Entertainment; and SVP of Sovereign Pictures.

Prior to joining Troika, Gallo began his career as an independent filmmaker with the comedy-drama Magic Rock. He also has a background in journalism, and previously worked as a producer at CNN on shows including Anderson Cooper 360 and American Morning.

== History ==
=== Film ===
Amasia marked its first theatrical release with the Halle Berry thriller, The Call. In 2016, the company financed and produced the action-comedy film Mr. Right. Their following non-theatrical releases included Elizabeth Allen Rosenbaum's Careful What You Wish For, Vincent Masciale's "Fear, Inc," and David Gleeson's Don't Go. In August 2017, it was announced that Amasia Entertainment would co-produce Britt Poulton and Dan Madison Savage's drama Them That Follow with Gerard Butler's production company, G-Base. The film stars Alice Englert, Walton Goggins, Thomas Mann, Olivia Colman, Lewis Pullman, Jim Gaffigan and Kaitlyn Dever. It made its world premiered to favorable reviews in the Dramatic Competition at the 2019 Sundance Film Festival. In September 2019, filming began on the company’s romantic comedy, Wild Mountain Thyme, directed by John Patrick Shanley and starring Emily Blunt, Jamie Dornan, Christopher Walken, and Jon Hamm. The film was released in December 2020 by Bleecker Street. In October 2022, production wrapped on Amasia’s film Audrey’s Children, directed by Ami Canaan Mann and starring Natalie Dormer, Jimmi Simpson, and Clancy Brown. The film premiered at the Tribeca X Festival in June 2024, where it also won the award for Best Feature. Amasia’s horror thriller Worldbreaker, directed by Brad Anderson and starring Luke Evans, Milla Jovovich, and Billie Boullet, was released theatrically in January 2026.

=== Television ===
In September 2019, Amasia began development on Dark Shadows: Reincarnation, a follow-up to the 1960s gothic soap opera Dark Shadows, with Mark B. Perry as writer.

=== Future Projects ===
In November 2025, Deadline reported that Amasia set up The Green Hornet and Kato at Universal Pictures as a tentpole franchise.

In November 2025, Deadline reported that Amasia Entertainment secured the franchise rights to The Complete Idiot's Guide reference books from Penguin Random House, including scripted and unscripted film, television, streaming, podcast and ancillary rights.

The Saviors is an upcoming American dark comedy thriller film directed by Kevin Hamedani, and produced by Amasia Entertainment, which is set to premiere at 2026 South by Southwest Film & TV Festival.

== Filmography ==
=== Released ===
Film	Director	Release date
The Call	Brad Anderson	March 14, 2013
The Road Within	Gren Wells	April 17, 2015
Mr. Right	Paco Cabezas	April 7, 2016
Careful What You Wish For	Elizabeth Allen Rosenbaum	June 10, 2016
Zedd: True Colors	Susan Bonds and Alex Lieu	June 12, 2016
Fear, Inc.	Vincent Masciale	October 21, 2016
Don't Go	David Gleeson	October 26, 2018
Them That Follow	Britt Poulton and Dan Madison Savage	August 2, 2019
Wild Mountain Thyme	John Patrick Shanley	December 11, 2020
Not an Artist	Alexi Pappas and Jeremy Teicher	January 31, 2025
Audrey's Children	Ami Canaan Mann	March 28, 2025
World Breaker	Brad Anderson	January 30, 2026
The Passenger	Vadim Perelman	June 5, 2026

=== Upcoming films ===
Film	Director	Release date
The Saviors	Kevin Hamedani	TBA
The Green Hornet and Kato	TBA	TBA
