= Audrey Evans =

English paediatric oncologist (1925–2022)

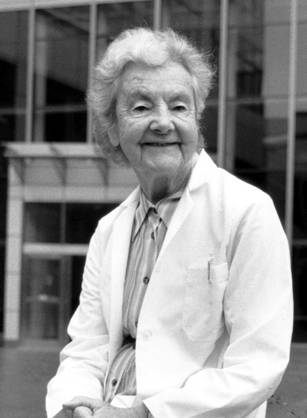
- Evans posing in front of the Children's Hospital of Philadelphia
- Born: 6 March 1925; York, England
- Died: 29 September 2022 (aged 97); Philadelphia, Pennsylvania, U.S.
- Education: Royal College of Surgeons of Edinburgh; Johns Hopkins University
- Occupation: Pediatric Oncologist
- Spouse: Giulio John D'Angio

Audrey Elizabeth Evans (6 March 1925 – 29 September 2022) was a British-born American pediatric oncologist who was known as the "Mother of Neuroblastoma." She was one of the co-founders of the original Ronald McDonald House in Philadelphia as well as a co-founder of Philadelphia's St James School. She spent most of her career working at the Children's Hospital of Philadelphia. Evans is the subject of the 2025 feature film Audrey's Children which stars Natalie Dormer and won Best Feature Film, Tribeca X at the Tribeca Film Festival 2024.

== Early life and education ==
Audrey Elizabeth Evans was born on 6 March 1925 in York, England. She was the youngest of three children born into a middle-class family. Her sister was six years older than her and her brother two years older. She attended a Quaker school before heading to a boarding school in Bristol, England where she stayed until the start of World War II. After the war began she went home and attended The Mount School in York, England. During her senior year, she developed tuberculosis causing her to miss school.

Evans trained at the Royal College of Surgeons of Edinburgh in the early 1950s. She was the only female student in the medical school. She struggled during her first year of medical school and ended up failing. She attributes her failing to the fact that she learned by listening and not by reading. She did two years of residency at the Royal Infirmary of Edinburgh where she was the only female in the program.

After finishing her degree in 1953, she applied and received the Fulbright Fellowship at Boston Children's Hospital. She trained there for two years under Sidney Farber, who is known as the father of modern chemotherapy. She went to Johns Hopkins University to finish her medical training in 1955.

== Career ==
In 1955, after she had finished medical training in the United States, she returned to England to practice specialty pediatrics. She soon learned that this field was strictly for men and not women. So, she headed back to the United States to pick up her career in pediatric oncology. She worked at Boston Children's Hospital at first. In 1964, she headed to the University of Chicago, to work at their hematology and oncology unit. Here, Evans was recruited by C. Everett Koop, Surgeon-in-Chief at the Children's Hospital of Philadelphia (CHOP) and future U.S. Surgeon General, to create a pediatric oncology unit. She spent the rest of her career at CHOP. Throughout her career she took a total care approach towards her patients, meaning that she did not just focus on her patients' physical needs but also their social, emotional, and spiritual needs, as well as supporting the families. In 1971, she created the Evans staging system for Neuroblastoma.

From 1969 to 1989, she served as chair of the Division of Oncology at the Children's Hospital of Philadelphia and in 1972 was appointed a professor of pediatrics at the University of Pennsylvania School of Medicine.

=== Work ===
Evans was known as the "Mother of Neuroblastoma" because of all of her work for neuroblastoma. After years of treating children with neuroblastoma she reduced its mortality rate by about fifty percent. Currently, the survival rate is above eighty five percent. Evans also instituted and chaired the early meetings for Advances in Neuroblastoma Research on 30 May 1975, as a series of symposia held at Children's Hospital of Philadelphia. The conference is designed to promote the exchange of information among investigators studying Neuroblastoma biology, diagnosis, prognosis, and therapy. In 1971, she created the Evans staging system to determine neuroblastoma disease progression and to determine what treatments would be most effective.

Evans described a staging system from one to four. Evans and D'Angio were the first to describe the phenomenon of spontaneous regression of widely spread neuroblastoma that they later dubbed "4S disease". This spontaneous regression usually occurs in infants younger than 6 months old.

=== Ronald McDonald House Charities ===
As CHOP's pediatric oncology department grew, people were coming from a wide range of places to be treated there. Evans realized that the families of the children that were being treated had no place to stay and would often get separated to different locations. In the early 1970s Evans was introduced to The Philadelphia Eagles General Manager, when the team had raised $100,000 for children with cancer in honor of one of the player's daughters who had leukemia. Evans accepted the money from Eagles owner, Jimmy Murray, and let him know that she needed $32,000 more in order to buy a house for the children and their families. A player for the Eagles had been advertising for McDonald's shamrock shakes and Murray asked regional manager, Ed Rensi, if he would donate money towards a house. Rensi agreed to use the proceeds from the shamrock shakes to pay for a house under the condition that it would be named the Ronald McDonald House. It started out as a place to stay and meet a person's basic needs; a place to sleep and eat. As the programs have grown they have adapted Evans' total care approach and created a place for family centered care. It's now considered a home away from home, free of charge. There are now more than 600 houses in more than 60 countries.

=== St. James School ===
After Evans retired in 2009 from her medical career she realized that she missed the kids too much. She decided that she wanted to get involved in a school. There was a city camp on a school campus that she started to be involved with but the campus would close once summer ended. They decided to open the campus as a school. The St. James School was opened on 11 September 2011. It was a tuition free school for kids in the Allegheny West, Philadelphia area. The school's goal is to break the cycle of poverty by having an extended school year.

== Personal life and death ==
Evans was a deeply religious woman: “The pillars of Audrey's career were faith and science. She believed that God brought her here to care for dying children."

In 2005, Evans married Giulio John D'Angio, at seven o'clock in the morning so they were able to make it to work 90 minutes later. Both were over 80 years old, and knew each other over 50 years. D'Angio had two sons, Carl and Peter, from a previous marriage. Giulio and Audrey met in 1953, while they were both working at Boston Children's Hospital. Their first interaction was when she was sitting at his desk going through his mail.

Giulio D'Angio preceded Evans in death in 2018, aged 96. Evans died in Philadelphia on 29 September 2022, aged 97.

== Legacy ==
Evans' biography is depicted in the film Audrey's Children, directed by Ami Canaan Mann and released on 28 March 2025. She is portrayed by Natalie Dormer. A children's book titled Audrey Evans: Not Your Ordinary Doctor was published about her in 2019.

== Awards and honors ==
- In 1976, she received The Janeway Award from the American Radium Society.
- In 1995, she received the Distinguished Career Award from the American Society of Pediatric Hematology/Oncology.
- In 1997, she received the William Osler Patient Oriented Research Award from the University of Pennsylvania.
- In 2000, she received the Lifetime Achievement Award from the Advances in Neuroblastoma Research Association.
- In 2008, she was selected as the honorary member of the American Society for Therapeutic Radiology and Oncology
- In 2018, she received an honorary degree of Doctor of Humane Letters from Holy Family University
