= American Society of Pediatric Hematology/Oncology =

American professional organization

- Abbreviation: ASPHO
- Legal status: Non-profit
- Headquarters: Chicago, Illinois
- Members: 2,000 (2018)
- President: Patrick Leavey
- Immediate Past President: Amy Billett
- Website: aspho.org

The American Society of Pediatric Hematology/Oncology (abbreviated ASPHO) is an American multidisciplinary professional organization dedicated to improving care in the medical disciplines of pediatric hematology and oncology. As of 2018, it had 2,000 members.

== History ==
The American Society of Pediatric Hematology/Oncology was founded in 1981, largely because of the efforts of physician Carl Pochedly, who served as its secretary-treasurer for fourteen years. After holding meetings jointly with the American Pediatric Society and the Society for Pediatric Research, the ASPHO held its first independent meeting in Chicago, Illinois, in 1988. The society was incorporated in the state of Illinois in 1989.

== Publications ==
Since 2004, the official journal of ASPHO has been Pediatric Blood & Cancer. Its official journal was originally the Journal of Pediatric Hematology/Oncology, which was established by Pochedly in 1979 as the American Journal of Pediatric Hematology/Oncology.
