= Audrey's Children =

American biopic film

- Theatrical release poster
- Directed by: Ami Canaan Mann
- Written by: Julia Fisher Farbman
- Produced by: Michael A. Helfant; Bradley Gallo; Julia Fisher Farbman
- Starring: Natalie Dormer; Jimmi Simpson; Brandon Micheal Hall; Julianna Layne; Clancy Brown
- Cinematography: Jon Keng
- Edited by: Matthew Ramsey
- Music by: Genevieve Vincent
- Production companies: Amasia Entertainment; Resonate Entertainment
- Distributed by: Blue Harbor Entertainment
- Release dates: June 2024 (Tribeca); March 28, 2025 (United States)
- Running time: 110 minutes
- Country: United States
- Language: English

Audrey's Children is a 2024 American biographical drama film directed by Ami Canaan Mann and written by Julia Fisher Farbman. Natalie Dormer stars as healthcare pioneer and Ronald McDonald House Charities co-founder Dr. Audrey Evans, who served as Chief of Pediatric Oncology at the Children's Hospital of Philadelphia. Jimmi Simpson, Brandon Micheal Hall, Julianna Layne, and Clancy Brown co-star.

Audrey's Children premiered at the 2024 Tribeca Festival, and was released in the United States on March 28, 2025, by Blue Harbor Entertainment.

== Premise ==
Audrey Evans was a British-born American pediatric oncologist who revolutionized treatment for neuroblastoma, a deadly form of pediatric nerve cancer, from which 90% of patients died in 1970. She also co-founded the Ronald McDonald House Charities, an organization which went on to provide housing support to millions of people across the world. However, as a strong-willed woman, she was considered unconventional and idiosyncratic, and her nature clashed with hospital leaders.

== Cast ==
- Natalie Dormer as Dr. Audrey Evans
- Jimmi Simpson as Dr. Dan D'Angio
- Brandon Micheal Hall as Dr. Brian Faust
- Julianna Layne as Mia McAlister
- Clancy Brown as Dr. C. Everett Koop
- Evelyn Giovine as Kate Watson

== Production ==
Ami Canaan Mann was announced as director of the biopic in May 2022. The script is from Julia Fisher Farbman based on years of research and conversations with Dr Evans herself, who reportedly supported the film. Farbman had, in 2016, profiled Evans for the Amazon Prime series Modern Hero Farbman also acts as producer alongside Bradley Gallo and Michael Helfant for Amasia Entertainment.

=== Casting ===
In July 2022, Natalie Dormer was cast in the lead role for the film. In September 2022, Clancy Brown, Brandon Micheal Hall, Jimmi Simpson and Evelyn Giovine were added to the cast.

=== Filming ===
In September 2022, principal photography was scheduled for locations in Philadelphia. Filming locations included Center City. Filming had wrapped prior to the end of November 2022.

== Release ==
The film was expected to have a 2023 release, but premiered October 20, 2024 at the Philadelphia Film Festival. It opened in theaters on March 28, 2025.
