= The Passenger (2026 film) =

Thriller film by Vadim Perelman

- Theatrical release poster
- Directed by: Vadim Perelman
- Screenplay by: Bennett Fisher
- Based on: Damascus by Bennett Fisher
- Produced by: Bradley Gallo; Norman Golightly; Sean Harner; Michael Helfant; Jib Polhemus
- Starring: Kodi Smit-McPhee; Djimon Hounsou
- Cinematography: C. Kim Miles
- Edited by: Mike Munn
- Music by: Aleksey Kantsiru
- Production companies: WestEnd Films; Amasia Entertainment; Van Evera; Dark Castle Entertainment
- Distributed by: Vertical
- Release date: June 5, 2026
- Running time: 93 minutes
- Country: United States
- Language: English

The Passenger is a 2026 American thriller film directed by Vadim Perelman, based on the 2016 play Damascus by Bennett Fisher. It stars Kodi Smit-McPhee and Djimon Hounsou.

== Premise ==
Hounsou plays Hassan, a Somali-American shuttle driver who gets an offer from a mysterious passenger to take him from Minneapolis to Chicago. Unbeknownst to Hassan, his passenger has a dark and potentially catastrophic purpose.

== Cast ==
- Djimon Hounsou as Hassan
- Kodi Smit-McPhee as Lloyd
- Leigh-Ann Rose as Fatima
- Carolina Campos as Grace
- Tegan Couchman as Ahmed

== Production ==
WestEnd Films announced the project, originally titled The Zealot, at Cannes. The movie began filming in Winnipeg in the fourth quarter of 2024 and had finished filming by November 2024.

== Release ==
In February 2026, Vertical acquired North American distribution rights to the film.
