= A Small Light =

2023 biographical drama miniseries

- Genre: Biopic war drama
- Created by: Joan Rater; Tony Phelan
- Starring: Bel Powley; Liev Schreiber; Joe Cole; Amira Casar; Billie Boullet; Ashley Brooke
- Music by: Ariel Marx
- Country of origin: United States
- Original language: English
- No. of episodes: 8

Production
- Executive producers: Susanna Fogel; Avi Nir; Tony Phelan; Joan Rater; Alon Shtruzman; Peter Traugott
- Running time: 40–55 minutes
- Production companies: John Street Productions; Midwest Livestock; Keshet Studios; National Geographic Studios; ABC Signature

Original release
- Network: National Geographic
- Release: May 1 – May 22, 2023

A Small Light is a biographical war drama miniseries about Miep Gies, a secretary who helped her Jewish employer Otto Frank, his family (including Anne Frank), and other Jewish refugees go into hiding after the German invasion of the Netherlands during the Second World War. The series was created by Joan Rater and Tony Phelan. It premiered on National Geographic on May 1, 2023 and on Disney+ and Hulu the following day.

== Premise ==
Secretary Miep Gies helps her Jewish employer Otto Frank, his family, and other Jewish refugees go into hiding during World War II after the German invasion of the Netherlands.

== Cast and characters ==
=== Main ===
- Bel Powley as Miep Gies
  - Agi Tietjen as young Miep
- Joe Cole as Jan Gies
- Amira Casar as Edith Frank
- Billie Boullet as Anne Frank
  - Zoe Ponzo as young Anne
- Ashley Brooke as Margot Frank
  - Polly Sakoufaki as young Margot
- Liev Schreiber as Otto Frank

=== Recurring ===
- Andy Nyman as Hermann van Pels
- Caroline Catz as Auguste van Pels
- Ian McElhinney as Johannes Kleiman
- Nicholas Burns as Victor Kugler
- Sally Messham as Bep Voskuijl
- Liza Sadovy as Mrs. Stoppelman
- Laurie Kynaston as Casmir
  - Noah Leggott portrays young Casmir
- Eleanor Tomlinson as Tess
- Rudi Goodman as Peter Van Pels
- Sebastian Armesto as Max Stoppelman
- Noah Taylor as Dr. Friedrich "Fritz" Pfeffer
- Sean Hart as Willem Arondéus
- Bill Milner as Tonny Ahlers
- Hanna van Vliet as Frieda Belinfante
- Preston Nyman as Kuno van der Horst

=== Guest ===
- Tom Stourton as Daniel van Dijk
- Vicki Pepperdine as Gerdi Lange
- Tyrone Huntley as a singer
- Jim High as Bram Becker
- Ben Esler as Father Dirksen
- Mohana Rajagopal as Mrs. Reddy
- Dylan Edwards as Isaac Schwarz
- Sarah T. Cohen as Maya Schwarz
- Hannah Bristow as Betje
- Sarah Winter as Liesje
- Judith Georgi as Vera
- Daniel Donskoy as Karl Josef Silberbauer
- Victor McGuire as Willem Grootendorst
- Lisa Karlström as Charlotte Kaletta

== Episodes ==
No.	Title	Directed by	Written by	Original release date
1	"Pilot"	Susanna Fogel	Joan Rater & Tony Phelan	May 1, 2023
In 1933 Amsterdam, Miep is an aimless young woman who is hired as a secretary by Otto Frank at the company Opekta. Otto is Jewish, recently fled Nazi Germany, and has been unable to secure a visa to the United States. He and Miep bond over their refugee status, as the Austrian Miep was adopted by her Dutch family to escape famine as a child. Otto's wife and two daughters, Margot and Anne, soon join him in Amsterdam. Miep begins a romance with social worker Jan Gies, and they eventually marry. In 1940, the Nazis swiftly invade the Netherlands. In 1942, Miep agrees to help the Frank family hide in a concealed attic apartment above the Opekta offices. Margot is given a deportation order to a work camp, so Miep hides her before the rest of the Franks. Jan is angry that Miep did not discuss the matter with him, but is ultimately proud of her.
2	"Welcome to Switzerland"	Susanna Fogel	Joan Rater & Tony Phelan	May 1, 2023
Miep and her fellow employees keep running the offices while the Franks shelter in the attic apartment. Otto has left a false paper trail to deceive the Nazis into believing the Franks are in Switzerland. Otto's business partner Mr. Van Pels, his wife, and their son, Peter, hide in the attic as well. Miep and Jan's Jewish landlady, Mrs. Stoppelman, allows her daughter, son-in-law, and their two children, Alfred and Liddy, to stay in her home. As food shortages worsen, Miep and Jan manage to get the Franks and Van Pelses fake ID papers to secure more food rations. Miep's Jewish dentist, Dr. Pfeffer, is also allowed to hide in the attic. Jan is recruited by his boss to join the Dutch resistance, but he's instructed not to tell Miep. A Nazi officer informs Jan that Alfred and Liddy's parents were arrested.
3	"Motherland"	Susanna Fogel	William Harper	May 8, 2023
Miep and Jan struggle to find a hiding place for Alfred and Liddy. Meanwhile, tensions rise in the attic, especially between Anne and her mother. Through the resistance, Jan connects with Willem Arondéus, who sends Jan to collect an abandoned Jewish baby. Willem returns the favor by finding families to shelter Alfred and Liddy. Miep learns that Tonny Ahlers, a member of the Dutch Nazi Party (NSB), was blackmailing Otto due to him voicing anti-Nazi sentiments in the past. Otto feels guilty that he wasn't more careful, but Miep insists he's gone above and beyond to protect his family. Alfred and Liddy are separated from one another for safety and transported to new homes. Miep asks Anne to act more compassionately towards her mother and fight less, to which she agrees.
4	"The Butterfly"	Leslie Hope	Ben Esler	May 8, 2023
As the holiday season approaches, the Opekta offices are burgled and the Jewish refugees are nearly discovered. To increase security, the staff disguises the attic door as a bookcase. Jan's secret work with the resistance strains his marriage. Miep's friend, Tess, gifts her a golden necklace with butterfly charms. Jan and Miep attend a Christmas party at the estate of Tess's wealthy boyfriend, Daniel. When Jan realizes all the guests are Nazis, he and Miep swiftly leave. Instead, they spend the first night of Hanukkah with the Franks, Van Pelses, and Pfeffer. Otto informs Miep that the butterfly necklace is a secret Jewish symbol that folds into a Star of David, and it was likely stolen. When Miep questions if she can trust anyone, Jan confesses he's working with the Dutch resistance. Miep begs Tess to leave Daniel, but she refuses. As a result, Miep ends their friendship.
5	"Scheißfeld"	Lesile Hope	William Harper	May 15, 2023
Jan helps Willem and other resistance fighters plan a bombing of the Amsterdam civil registry office to hinder the Nazis' ability to identify persecuted citizens. Anne develops a crush on Peter, which worries her mother due to the attic's close quarters. Mrs. Stoppelman leaves the city to hide and, in exchange, the Gieses host college student Kuno. Miep's brother, Casmir, alerts her to Jan's association with militant rebels. She confronts Jan, but he leaves without revealing his plans. After the registry is blown up, suspects are arrested and sentenced to death, including Willem. The missing Jan eventually contacts Miep and they reunite on a tulip farm (the titular "Scheißfeld"). He didn't participate in the bombing, but must still keep a low profile. Anne's romantic feelings for Peter pass. Miep gives her a dress and new shoes for when the war ends.
6	"Boiling Point"	Tony Phelan	Alyssa Margarite Jacobson	May 15, 2023
The Germans grow more ruthless towards civilians. The attic group tries to keep their spirits up by making plans for after the war, but Mrs. Frank feels hopeless. NSB officer Ahlers offers Miep a reward if she gives up the Franks, but she continues to feign ignorance of their whereabouts. The Nazis raid the Jewish Council headquarters and send most remaining Jews in Amsterdam to camps. Miep and Jan shelter Mrs. Stoppelman's two adult children and two JC nurses. Kuno seems very ill until an abscess bursts and he recovers. With the help of a spy posing as a Nazi soldier, Jan smuggles the Stoppelmans and nurses out of the city. News of the Normandy landings arrives, causing excitement in the attic. The next day, as the Opekta workers chat, an unseen man points a gun at Miep's head.
7	"What Can Be Saved"	Tony Phelan	William Harper	May 22, 2023
On August 4, 1944, the Nazis raid Opekta. The sliding bookcase fails to fool officer Karl Silberbauer, leading to the discovery of the Franks, Van Pelses, and Dr. Pfeffer. The Nazis arrest everyone, including employees Kleiman and Kugler. Miep appeals to Silberbauer, as they are both Viennese. He won't free the arrested, but doesn't detain her. Miep and her coworker, Bep, wonder who tipped off the Gestapo, but they can't be sure. As the Gieses are now on the Nazis' radar, Kuno leaves the house for his own safety. Jan and Miep decide to "buy back" their friends, and so they collect money from the community. Jan wants to conduct the bribe, but Miep points out that her shared Austrian heritage is their only advantage with Silberbauer. He relents and she enters the Gestapo headquarters alone.
8	"Legacy"	Tony Phelan	Joan Rater & Tony Phelan	May 22, 2023
Miep tries to bribe the Nazis for the release of her friends and coworkers, but they simply keep her money and throw her out of the building. While inspecting the attic, she finds Anne's diary and saves it. Two months later, the famine-stricken Netherlands are finally freed when the Allies arrive. Kleiman, Kugler, and Otto return to the city. Otto reports that Mrs. Frank and Mr. Van Pels are dead, and he lost track of the others. Alfred is returned to Mrs. Stoppelman, but Liddy succumbed to illness during the war. Miep and Jan help Otto look for the missing, only to learn that Peter, Margot, and Anne have all died. Miep gives Anne's diary to the grieving Otto. By invitation, he lives with the Gieses for seven years, and he's the only member of the attic group that survives the war. Otto publishes Anne's writings as The Diary of a Young Girl. Miep lives to 100 and works to encourage others to fight for a better world. She is quoted, "Even an ordinary secretary, or a housewife, or a teenager can turn on a small light in a dark room."

== Production ==
=== Development ===
It was announced in February 2022 that Disney+ had greenlit the miniseries from National Geographic, which Tony Phelan and Joan Rater wrote and Susanna Fogel directing multiple episodes of the series. In April Bel Powley was cast as Gies, with Liev Schreiber starring as Otto Frank and Joe Cole as Jan Gies. Amira Casar, Billie Boullet and Ashley Brooke would join in June, with Boullet cast as Anne Frank.

Production began by July 2022, with filming taking place between Hradec Králové, Prague and Amsterdam in summer 2022.

=== Music ===
A Small Light (Songs from the Limited Series)

Soundtrack album by various artists
- Released: May 23, 2023
- Length: 24:40

The series' soundtrack was executive produced and co-produced by Este Haim, and features covers by musicians including Danielle Haim, Kamasi Washington, Sharon Van Etten, Angel Olsen, Weyes Blood, Remi Wolf, King Princess, Orville Peck, and Moses Sumney. The soundtrack album was released on May 23, 2023.

A Small Light (Songs from the Limited Series) track listing
No.	Title	Artist(s)	Length
1.	"Till We Meet Again"	Danielle Haim	2:28
2.	"Cheryl"	Kamasi Washington	5:23
3.	"I Don't Want to Set the World on Fire"	Sharon Van Etten and Michael Imperioli	3:06
4.	"My Reverie"	Angel Olsen	3:09
5.	"When You're Smiling"	Weyes Blood	2:29
6.	"Autumn Leaves"	Remi Wolf	2:12
7.	"I'm Making Believe"	Orville Peck and King Princess	2:15
8.	"I'll Be Seeing You"	Moses Sumney	3:34
Total length:			24:40

== Release ==
A Small Light premiered on National Geographic on May 1, 2023. It was released on Disney+ and Hulu on May 2, 2023. It later aired on Freeform on May 6, 2023.

== Reception ==
=== Audience viewership ===
On May 4, 2023, according to Jordan Williams of Screen Rant, "With over 11 million recorded attention signals across online platforms, A Small Light is generating considerable buzz from potential viewers, including the second-greatest hype on YouTube for May 2023 releases."

=== Critical response ===
The review aggregator website Rotten Tomatoes reported a 100% approval rating with an average rating of 8.80/10, based on 34 critic reviews. The website's critics consensus reads, "Bel Powley's arresting performance burns bright in A Small Light, a sensitive portrait of heroism in the face of all-encompassing tragedy." Metacritic, which uses a weighted average, assigned a score of 83 out of 100 based on 16 critics, indicating "universal acclaim".

Christine Persaud and Nick Perry of Digital Trends included A Small Light in their "Best Shows on Hulu Right Now" list. Kelly Connolly of TV Guide included A Small Light in their "74 Best TV Shows on Hulu Right Now" list. Tamara Fuentes of Cosmopolitan included A Small Light in their "30 Best TV Shows of 2023 We Can't Get Enough Of" list.

== Accolades ==
Awards and nominations received by A Small Light
Year (Note: The states year refers to the originally planned ceremony date)	Award	Category	Nominee	Result	Ref.
2023	Golden Trailer Awards	Best BTS/EPK for a TV/Streaming Series (Over 2 minutes)	A Small Light	Won	
2023	Gotham Awards	Outstanding Performance in a New Series	Bel Powley	Nominated	
2023	Gotham Awards	Breakthrough Television Over 40 Minutes	A Small Light	Won	
2023	Astra TV Awards	Best Broadcast Network or Cable Limited or Anthology Series	A Small Light	Won	
2023	Astra TV Awards	Best Actress in a Broadcast Network or Cable Limited or Anthology Series	Bel Powley	Nominated	
2023	Astra TV Awards	Best Supporting Actor in a Broadcast Network or Cable Limited or Anthology Series	Liev Schreiber	Won	
2023	Astra TV Awards	Best Directing in a Broadcast Network or Cable Limited or Anthology Series	Susanna Fogel (for "Pilot")	Won	
2023	Astra TV Awards	Best Writing in a Broadcast Network or Cable Limited or Anthology Series	Joan Rater and Tony Phelan (for "Pilot")	Nominated	
2023	Astra TV Awards	Artisan Spotlight	Ariel Marx (composer)	Won	
2023	Primetime Creative Arts Emmy Awards	Outstanding Music Composition for a Limited or Anthology Series, Movie or Special (Original Dramatic Score)	Ariel Marx (for "What Can Be Saved")	Nominated	
2023	TCA Awards	Outstanding Achievement in Movies, Miniseries and Specials	A Small Light	Nominated	
2023	Women's Image Network Awards	Outstanding Made For TV Movie, Limited Series	A Small Light	Pending	
2023	Women's Image Network Awards	Outstanding Actress in Made For TV Movie, Limited Series	Bel Powley	Pending	
2023	Women's Image Network Awards	Outstanding Drama Writer	Joan Rater (for "Pilot")	Pending	
2023	Women's Image Network Awards	Outstanding Series Director	Susanna Fogel (for "Pilot")	Pending	
2024	Critics' Choice Awards	Best Limited Series	A Small Light	Nominated	
2024	Critics' Choice Awards	Best Actress in a Limited Series or Movie Made for Television	Bel Powley	Nominated	
2024	Critics' Choice Awards	Best Supporting Actor in a Limited Series or Movie Made for Television	Liev Schreiber	Nominated	
2024	Critics' Choice Awards	Best Supporting Actress in a Limited Series or Movie Made for Television	Billie Boullet	Nominated	
2024	Independent Spirit Awards	Best Lead Performance in a New Scripted Series	Bel Powley	Nominated	
2024	Screen Actors Guild Awards	Outstanding Performance by a Female Actor in a Miniseries or Television Movie	Bel Powley	Nominated	
2024	Christopher Award	Affirming the highest values of the human spirit	A Small Light	Won	
2024	ATAS	For programming that "inspires, informs, motivates and even has the power to change lives"	A Small Light	Won	
