= In Darkness (2018 film) =

- Theatrical release poster
- Directed by: Anthony Byrne
- Written by: Anthony Byrne; Natalie Dormer
- Produced by: Anthony Byrne; Natalie Dormer; Ben Pugh; Adam Morane-Griffiths; Josh Varney
- Starring: Natalie Dormer; Ed Skrein; Emily Ratajkowski; Joely Richardson; Olegar Fedoro
- Cinematography: Si Bell
- Edited by: Tom Harrison-Read; Paul Knight
- Music by: Niall Byrne
- Production companies: 42 Production; XYZ Films
- Distributed by: Vertical Entertainment (United States); Shear Entertainment (United Kingdom; through Universal Pictures)
- Release dates: 25 May 2018 (United States); 6 July 2018 (United Kingdom)
- Running time: 101 minutes
- Countries: United Kingdom; United States
- Language: English
- Box office: $235,449

In Darkness is a 2018 thriller film directed by Anthony Byrne and written by Byrne and Natalie Dormer. It stars Dormer, Ed Skrein, Emily Ratajkowski and Joely Richardson. The film was released on 25 May 2018 in the United States by Vertical Entertainment and on 6 July 2018 in the United Kingdom by Shear Entertainment.

== Plot ==
Sofia McKendrick is a blind pianist living at an apartment in London, traumatised by her family's murder by Serbian paramilitaries. Her neighbour Veronique is the daughter of Serbian philanthropist Zoran Radic, a war criminal of the Bosnian War, suspected of running criminal organisations. Despite this, Sofia seemingly had an amicable relationship with Veronique. During a discussion in an elevator, Veronique discreetly slips Sofia a USB drive and tells her that the perfume is "Liquid Gold". Later, Sofia witnesses Veronique fall to her death after a struggle in her room. However, Sofia denies witnessing anything to police detective Mills, while hiding the USB drive.

Sofia performs at an event hosted by Radic, overhearing Radic and his associates discussing the circumstances of Veronique's death, with Radic being the one behind it. There, Radic's head of security Alexandra Gordon and her brother Marc have a discreet conversation revealing Veronique was pregnant and that Marc was sent to kill her; Marc had an affair with her and is likely the father of her child. Radic becomes fixated on Sofia for her connection to Veronique, and Sofia ends up dodging police questions and Radic's men looking over Veronique's apartment.

After Marc rescues Sofia from an attempted assault and kidnapping, Sofia bonds and starts an affair with him, learning that Veronique committed suicide out of paranoia. It is revealed that Sofia has her own vendetta towards Radic, conspiring with her adopted father Niall, a soldier who rescued her as a child. Sofia hands Nial the drive, with "Liquid Gold" being the password, uncovering Radic's assets and operations. Sofia recounts her sister, Balma, who could see but pretended to be blind for Sofia's benefit; Sofia's family were friends with Radic in Bosnia, but Radic betrayed them, leading the paramilitaries in their massacre. Veronique planned to expose her father's crimes and gave Sofia the drive to do so.

Sofia learns that Alexandra is seeking the drive, hoping to use it to usurp Radic's operations. Sofia hands Alexandra a copy in exchange for a photo with Sofia in (identifying her) and a private audience with Radic at Veronique's funeral. Sofia threatens to release the USB information if Alexandra shows anyone the photo. Alexandra gives Radic a copy of the photo at the funeral. Sofia confronts Radic, who realises the truth of Sofia's past. Radic claims he was in love with Sofia's mother, and raped her before she became pregnant with a blind daughter, and believes Sofia is his biological daughter. Radic leaves, as Sofia is left emotionally devastated. Detective Mills looks into Sofia's past, discovering that "Sofia" is an alias, named after Niall's biological daughter who died in infancy. Niall himself soon dies in the hospital.

Radic discovers Alexandra's treachery, ordering her death; despite the appeal from his sister, Marc abandons Alexandra for her involvement with his unborn child's death. Radic arrives at Sofia's apartment to personally kill her, while Marc rushes to her rescue. Meanwhile, Mills watches surveillance of Sofia's visit earlier in the front office, noticing she is looking at something. Mills realises she analysed Marc's wanted poster and makes his way to her apartment. As a fight ensues, Marc takes out Radic's men, while Radic overpowers and prepares to kill Sofia, as Sofia attempts to stab him. Marc arrives and shoves Radic out the window, impaling him on a spiked fence.

As Sofia looks over Marc, there is a final revelation; she was never blind and is Balma. During the massacre of their family, the real Sofia was killed while hiding. Balma was rescued, taking Sofia's identity, feigning blindness for years. Because of this, she previously saw a wanted poster and realises that Marc is a wanted fugitive. Marc encourages her to run, while he takes the fall for Radic's death, and Sofia flees the apartment before the police arrive.

== Cast ==
- Natalie Dormer as Sofia McKendrick / Balma
  - Lexie Benbow-Hart as Young Sofia
- Ed Skrein as Marc Gordon
- Emily Ratajkowski as Veronique Radic
- Neil Maskell as Oscar Mills
- Jan Bijvoet as Zoran Radic
- James Cosmo as Niall McKendrick
  - Ethan Cosmo as Young Niall McKendrick
- Joely Richardson as Alexandra Gordon
- Olegar Fedoro as Orthodox Priest
- Amber Anderson as Jane
- Hala Gorani as Herself

== Production ==
Sofia is depicted as living in Maida Vale, London, where scenes were shot for the film, including a flower shop on Lauderdale Road which was converted to act as a café. Sofia and Veronique's building is located in Bramham Gardens, Kensington. Other filming locations included Brompton Cemetery, Ealing Hospital, the Thames Embankment, New Zealand House and the National Gallery.

== Release ==
In February 2018, Vertical Entertainment acquired US distribution rights to the film. The film was released on 25 May 2018 in the United States. In the United Kingdom, the film was released on 6 July 2018 by Shear Entertainment through Universal Pictures.

== Reception ==
=== Box office ===
In the United Kingdom, the film grossed £1,550 in its opening week from 10 theaters.

=== Critical response ===
On Rotten Tomatoes, the film has an approval rating of 47% based on reviews from 32 critics, with an average rating of 4.9/10. On Metacritic, it has a score of 59 out of 100 based on reviews from seven critics, indicating "mixed or average" reviews.

The film, which features Dormer nude and contains a sex scene, has been criticised for what some critics called "gratuitous nudity". Dormer dismissed this in an interview with The Guardian, saying, "There has to be sexuality in the power play of a thriller. We have all got bodies, after all. In this film the sex scene, which for me was a love-making scene, is a metaphor for the way my character connects with the part played by Ed Skrein. Nakedness is a good equaliser and the shower scene also shows the tattoos on my character's body and makes it clear she is not quite who you think."
