= Critics' Choice Television Award for Best Supporting Actress in a Movie/Miniseries =

Television award

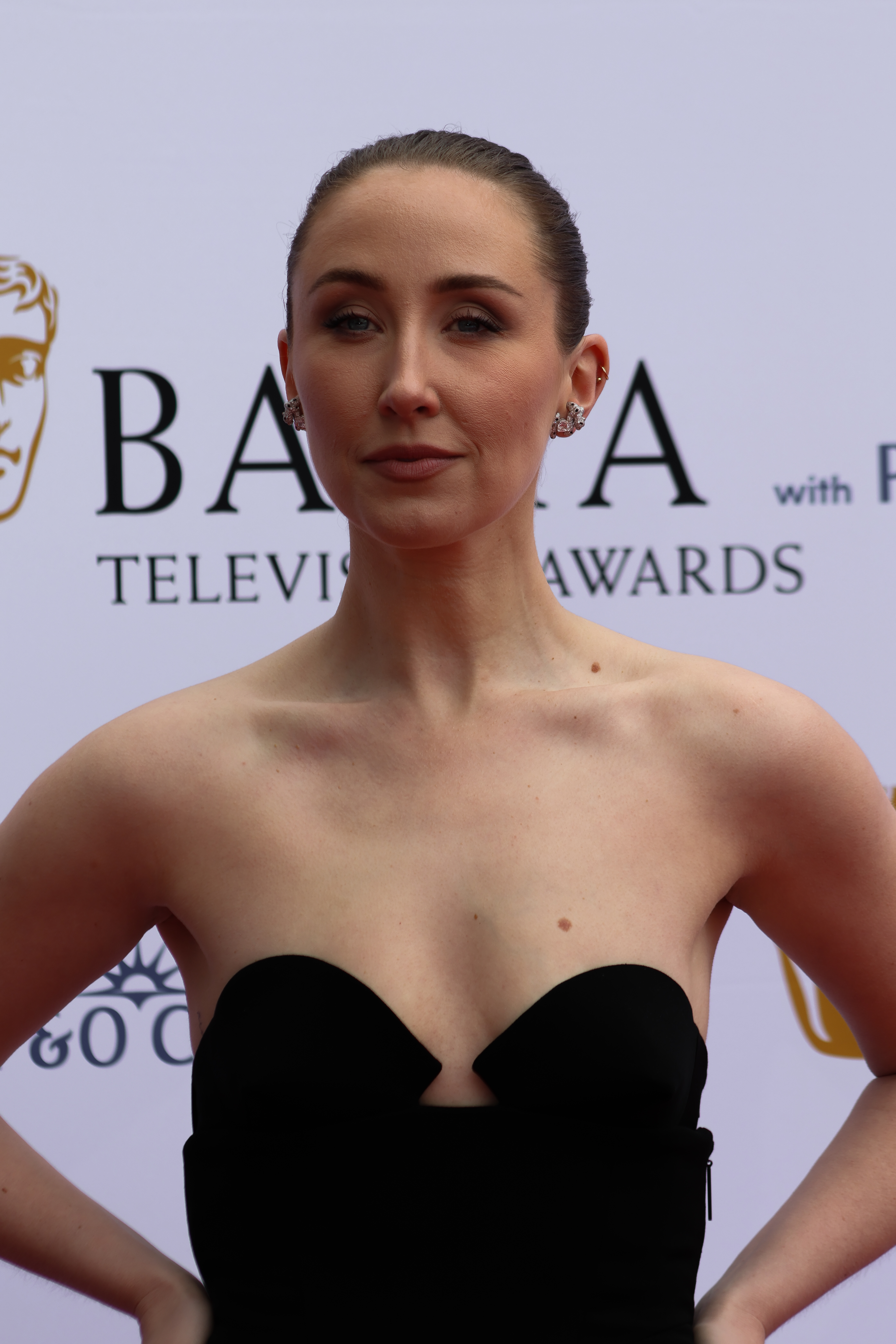
- The 2026 recipient: Erin Doherty
- Country: United States
- Presented by: Critics Choice Association
- First award: 2013
- Currently held by: Erin Doherty – Adolescence (2025)
- Website: criticschoice.com

The Critics' Choice Television Award for Best Supporting Actress in a Limited Series or Movie Made for Television is one of the award categories presented annually by the Critics' Choice Awards (CCA) to recognize the work done by television actors in a supporting role.

The category was first created in 2013. The winners are selected by a group of critics that are part of the Critics Choice Association.

Sarah Paulson holds the record for most wins in this category with 2 wins for her roles in American Horror Story: Asylum (2013) and American Horror Story: Freak Show (2015).

Three actresses hold the record for most nominations in this category: Paulson, Ellen Burstyn and Betty Gilpin.

The current winner in this category is Erin Doherty for Adolescence (2025).

== History ==
The category was first introduced for the 3rd Critics' Choice Television Awards, in which Sarah Paulson was the first actress to receive the award.

== Winners and nominees ==
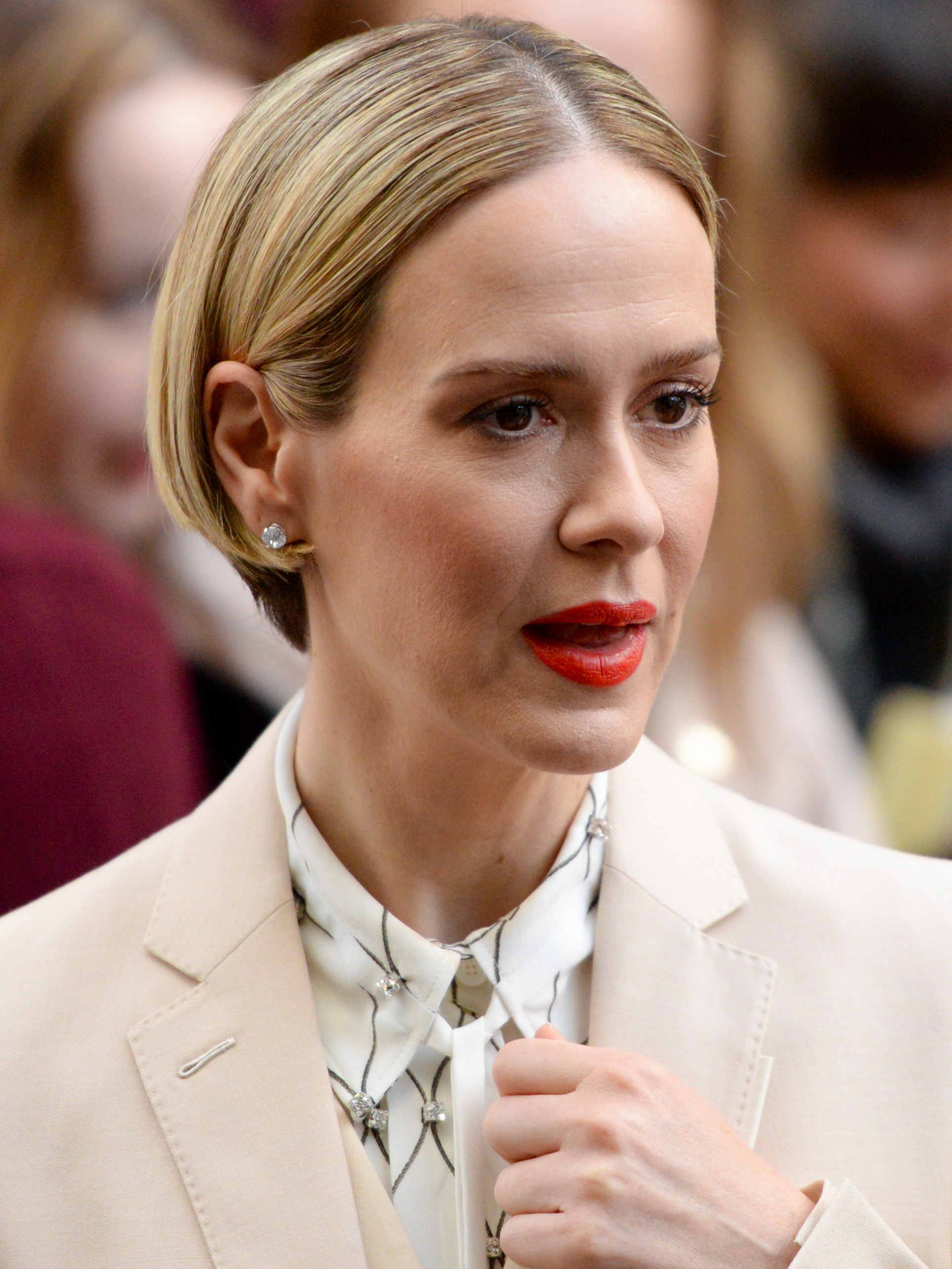
Sarah Paulson won twice for American Horror Story for Asyum (2013) and Freak Show (2015)

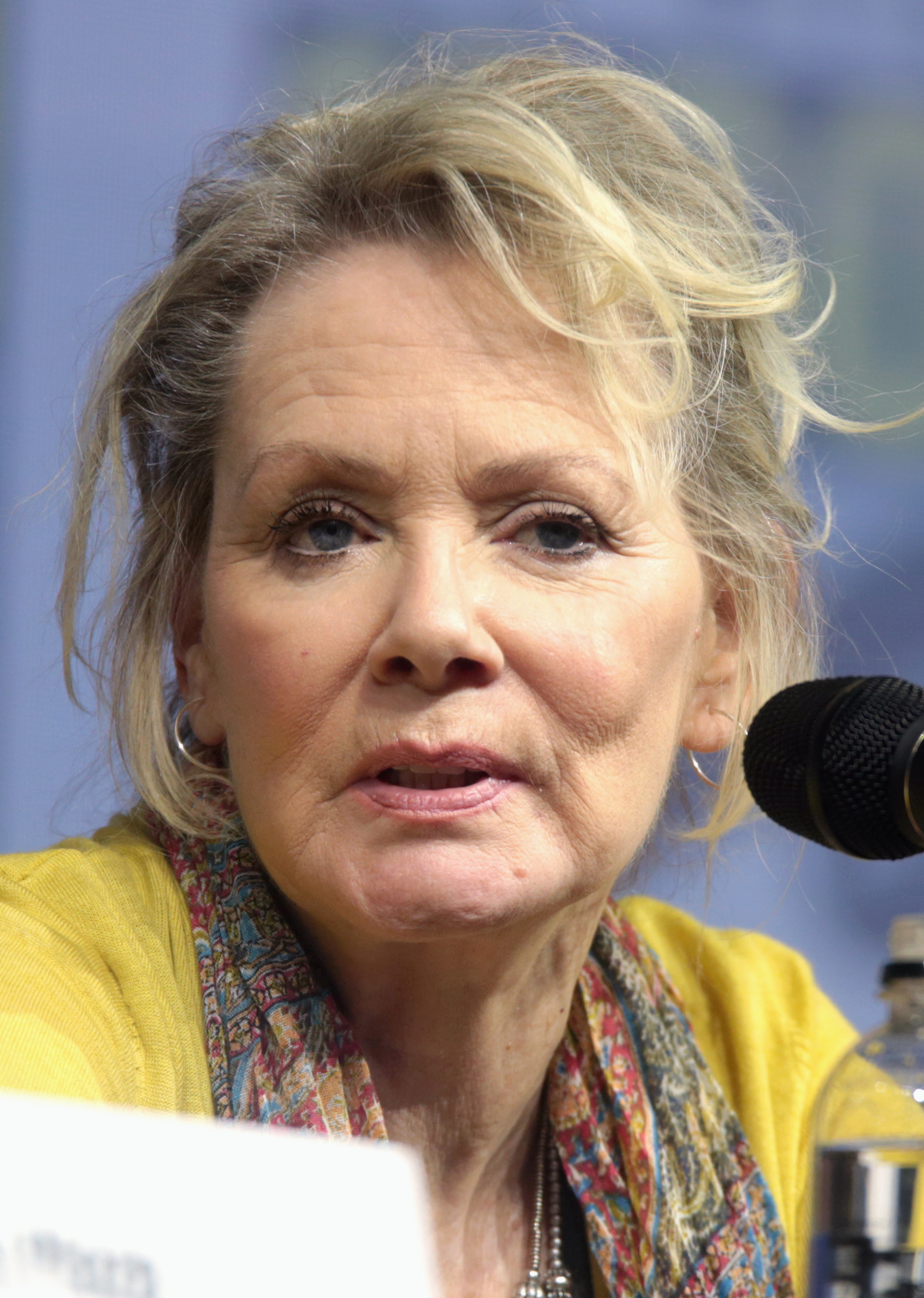
Jean Smart won for Fargo (2016)

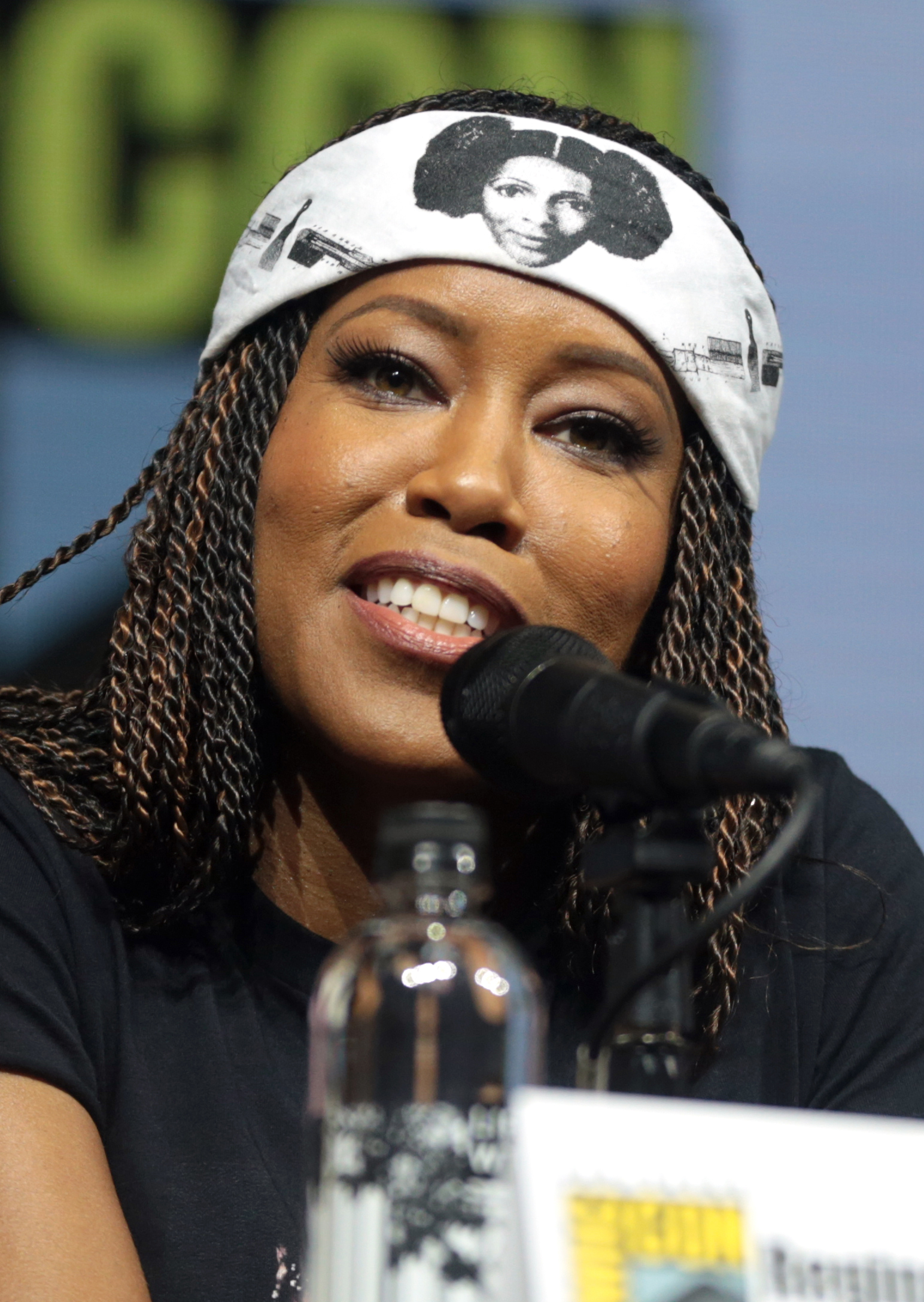
Regina King won for American Crime (2016)

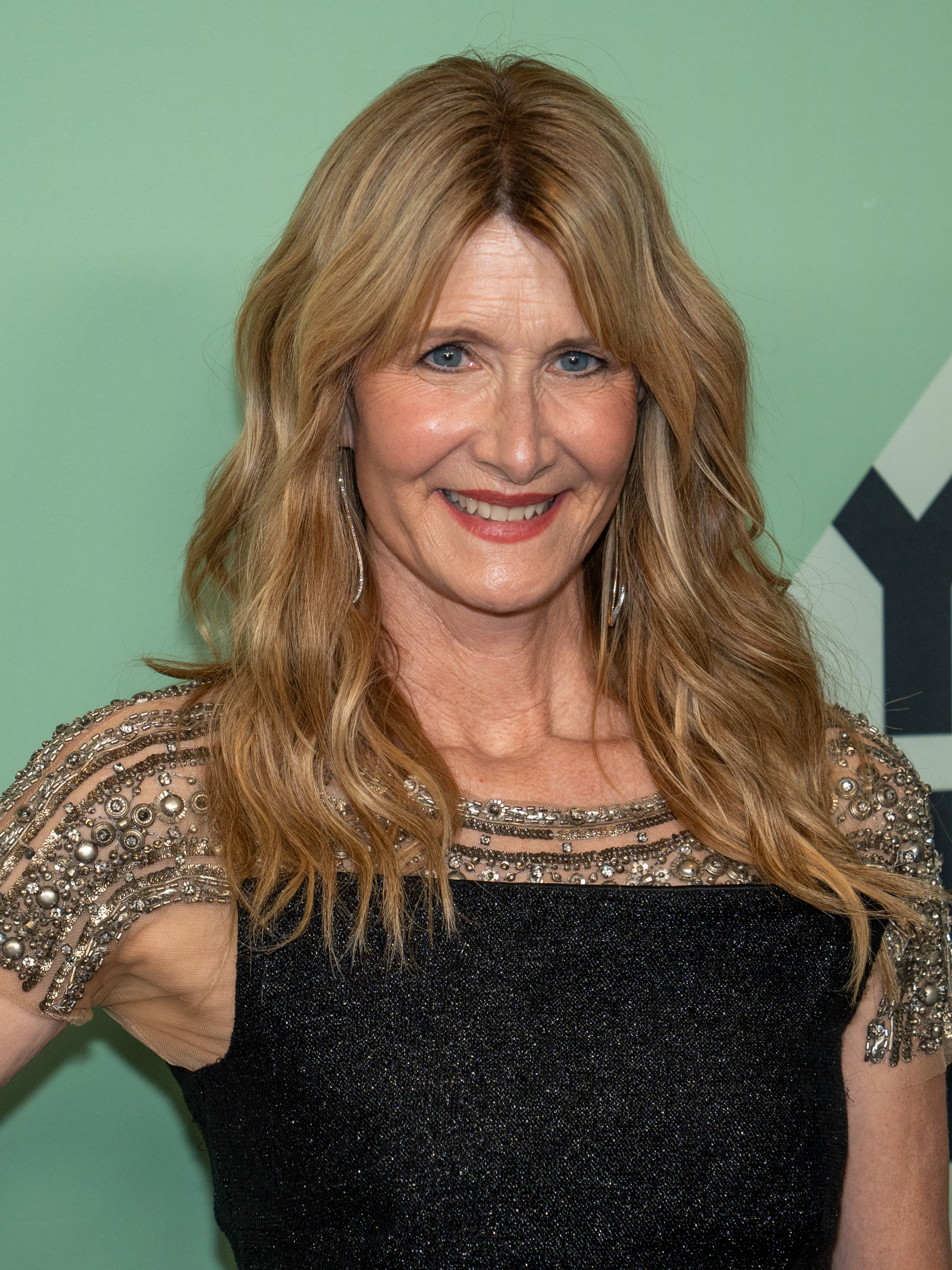
Laura Dern won for Big Little Lies (2017)

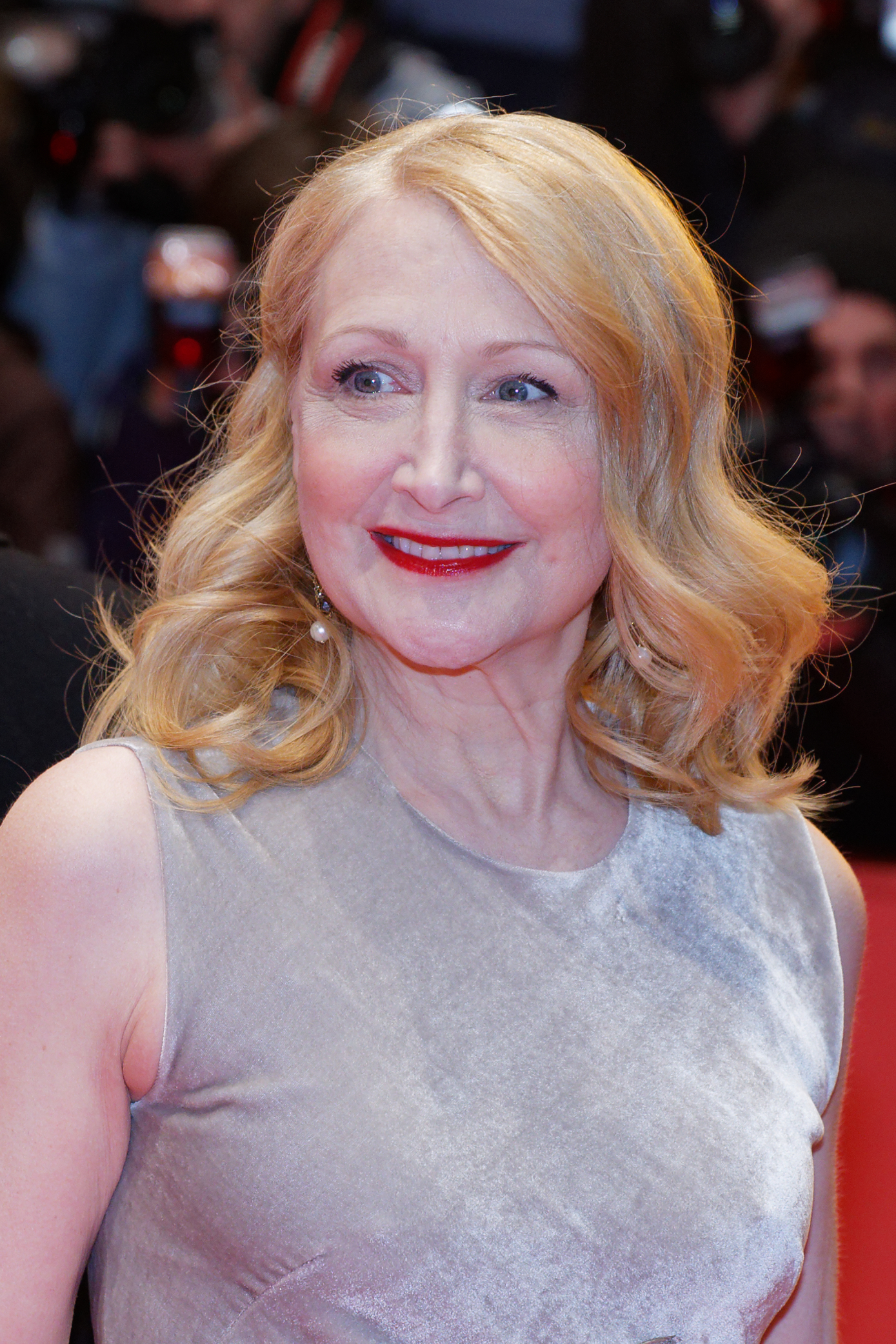
Patricia Clarkson won for Sharp Objects (2018)

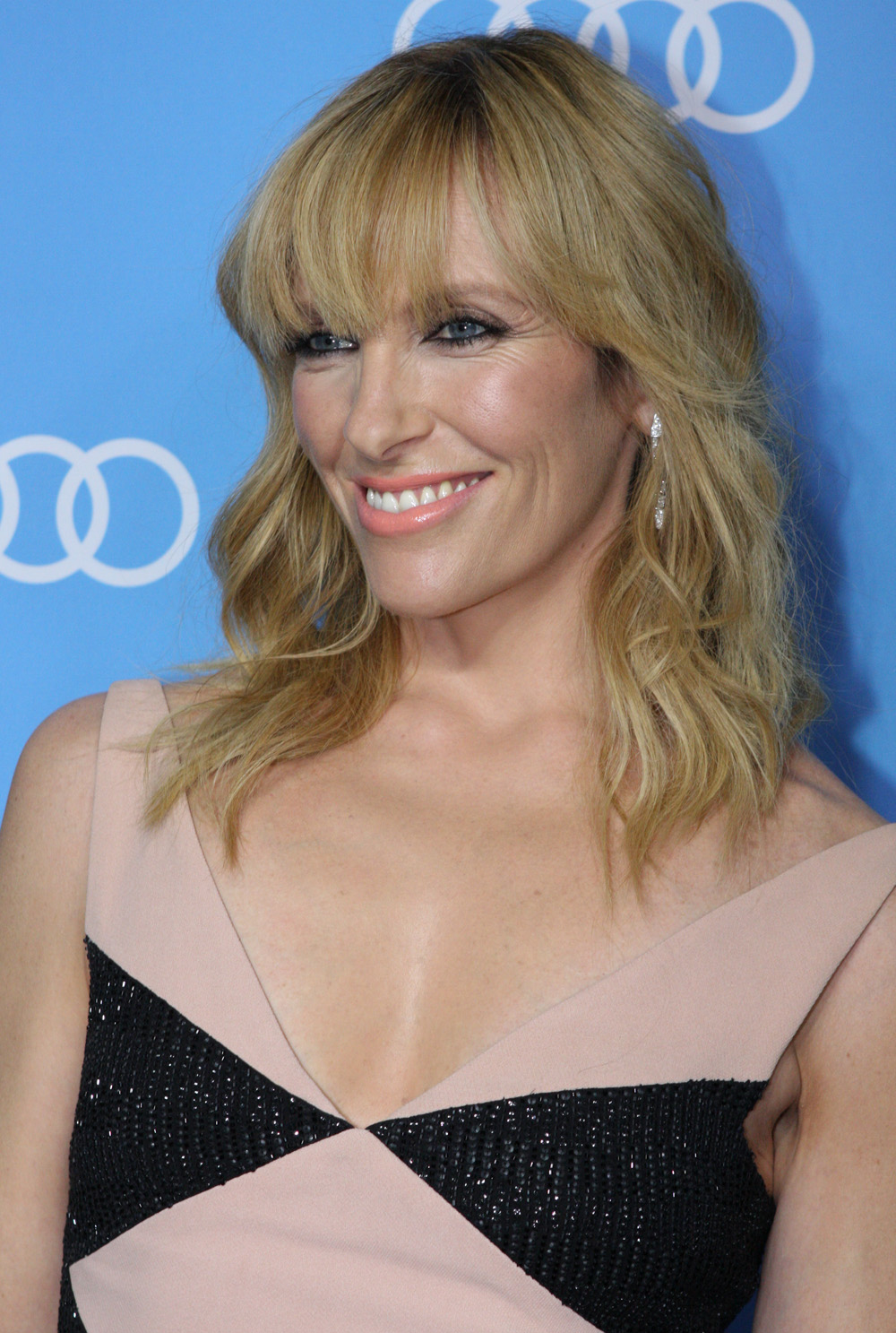
Toni Collette won for Unbelievable (2020)

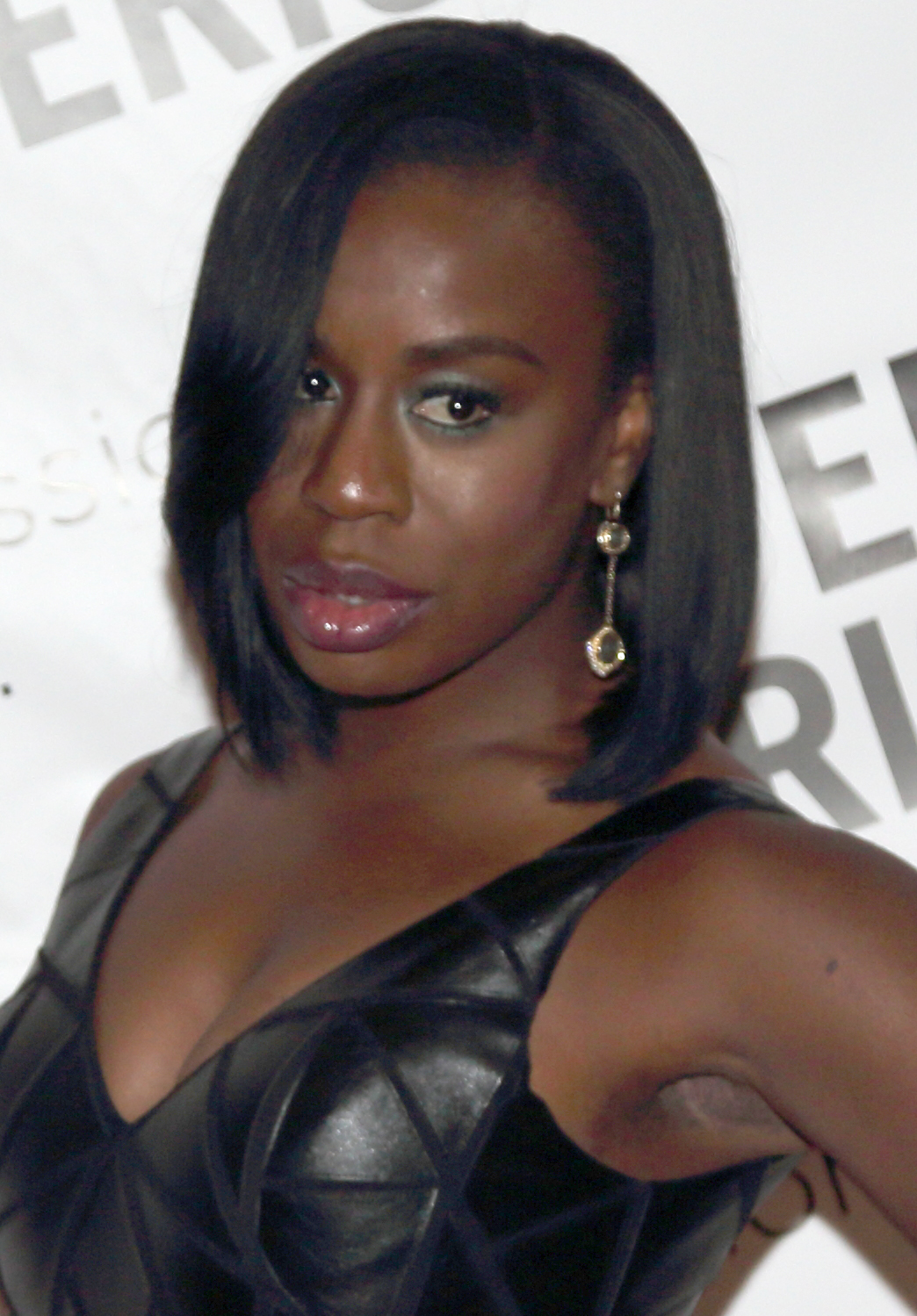
Uzo Aduba won for Mrs. America (2021)

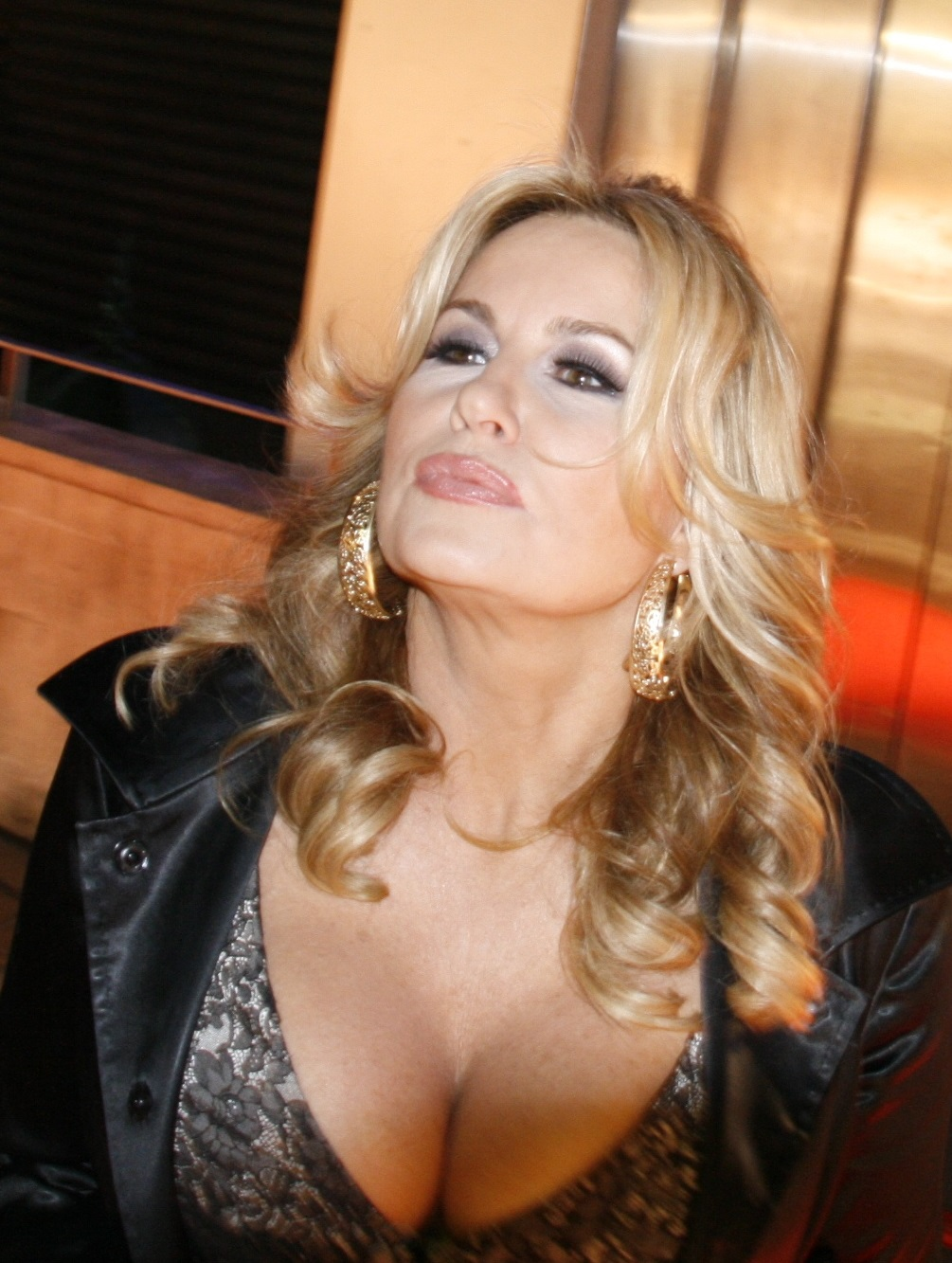
Jennifer Coolidge won for The White Lotus (2022)

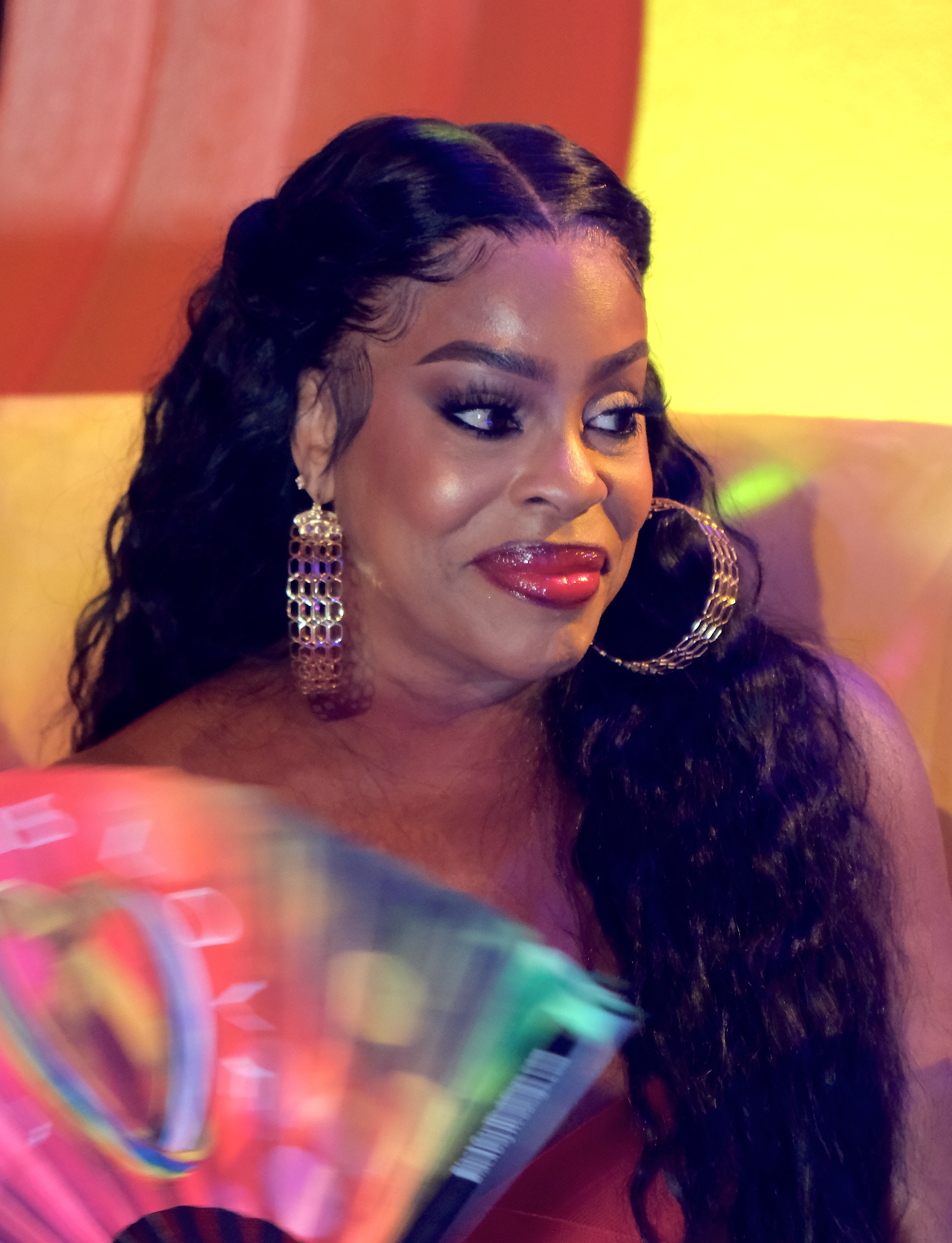
Niecy Nash-Betts won for Monster: The Jeffrey Dahmer Story (2023)

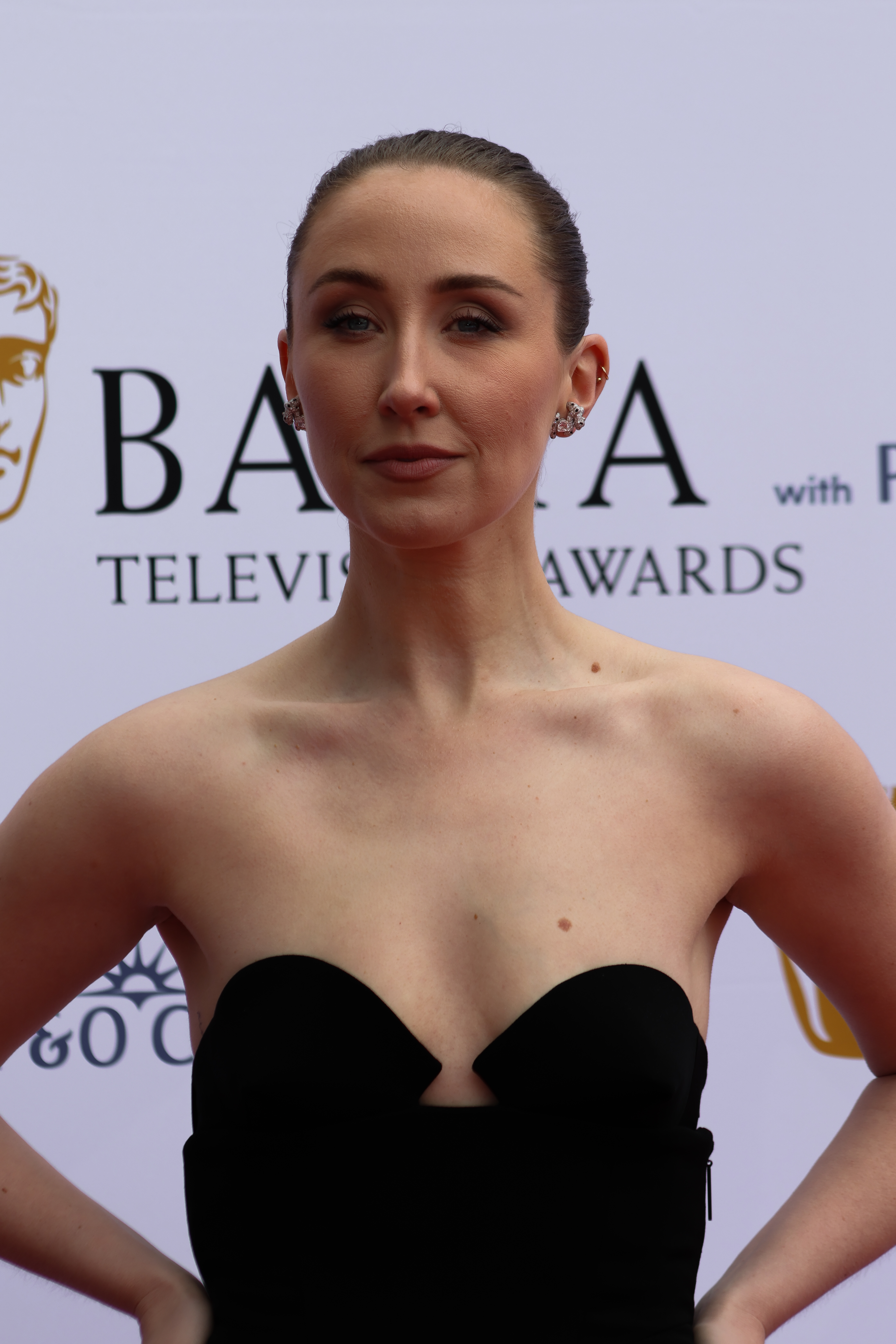
Erin Doherty won for Adolescence (2025)

=== 2010s ===
| Year | Actor | Role | Program | Network |
|---|---|---|---|---|
| 2013 | Sarah Paulson | American Horror Story: Asylum | Lana Winters | FX |
| 2013 | Ellen Burstyn | Political Animals | Margaret Barrish | USA |
| 2013 | Sienna Miller | The Girl | Tippi Hedren | HBO |
| 2013 | Imelda Staunton | The Girl | Alma Reville | HBO |
| 2013 | Lily Rabe | American Horror Story: Asylum | Sister Mary Eunice McKee | FX |
| 2013 | Alfre Woodard | Steel Magnolias | Louisa "Ouiser" Boudreaux | Lifetime |
| 2014 | Allison Tolman | Fargo | Deputy Molly Solverson | FX |
| 2014 | Amanda Abbington | Sherlock: His Last Vow | Mary Morstan | PBS |
| 2014 | Kathy Bates | American Horror Story: Coven | Delphine LaLaurie | FX |
| 2014 | Ellen Burstyn | Flowers in the Attic | Olivia Foxworth | Lifetime |
| 2014 | Jessica Raine | An Adventure in Space and Time | Verity Lambert | Lifetime |
| 2014 | Julia Roberts | The Normal Heart | Dr. Emma Brookner | HBO |
| 2015 | Sarah Paulson | American Horror Story: Freak Show | Bette and Dot Tattler | FX |
| 2015 | Khandi Alexander | Bessie | Viola Smith | HBO |
| 2015 | Mo'Nique | Bessie | Ma Rainey | HBO |
| 2015 | Claire Foy | Wolf Hall | Anne Boleyn | PBS |
| 2015 | Janet McTeer | The Honourable Woman | Dame Julia Walsh | SundanceTV |
| 2015 | Cynthia Nixon | Stockholm, Pennsylvania | Marcy Owens | Lifetime |
| 2016 (1) | Jean Smart | Fargo | Floyd Gerhardt | FX |
| 2016 (1) | Mary J. Blige | The Wiz Live! | Evillene, the Wicked Witch of the West | NBC |
| 2016 (1) | Laura Haddock | Luther | Megan Cantor | BBC America |
| 2016 (1) | Cristin Milioti | Fargo | Betsy Solverson | FX |
| 2016 (1) | Sarah Paulson | American Horror Story: Hotel | Sally McKenna | FX |
| 2016 (1) | Winona Ryder | Show Me a Hero | Vinni Restiano | HBO |
| 2016 (2) | Regina King | American Crime | Terri LaCroix | ABC |
| 2016 (2) | Elizabeth Debicki | The Night Manager | Jed Marshall | AMC |
| 2016 (2) | Sarah Lancashire | The Dresser | Madge | Starz |
| 2016 (2) | Emily Watson | The Dresser | "Her Ladyship" | Starz |
| 2016 (2) | Melissa Leo | All the Way | Lady Bird Johnson | HBO |
| 2016 (2) | Anna Paquin | Roots | Nancy Holt | History |
| 2018 | Laura Dern | Big Little Lies | Renata Klein | HBO |
| 2018 | Judy Davis | Feud: Bette and Joan | Hedda Hopper | FX |
| 2018 | Jackie Hoffman | Feud: Bette and Joan | Mamacita | FX |
| 2018 | Mary Elizabeth Winstead | Fargo | Nikki Swango | FX |
| 2018 | Regina King | American Crime | Kimara Walters | ABC |
| 2018 | Michelle Pfeiffer | The Wizard of Lies | Ruth Madoff | HBO |
| 2019 | Patricia Clarkson | Sharp Objects | Adora Crellin | HBO |
| 2019 | Ellen Burstyn | The Tale | Nadine "Nettie" Fox | HBO |
| 2019 | Penélope Cruz | The Assassination of Gianni Versace: American Crime Story | Donatella Versace | FX |
| 2019 | Judith Light | The Assassination of Gianni Versace: American Crime Story | Marilyn Miglin | FX |
| 2019 | Julia Garner | Dirty John | Terra Newell | Bravo |
| 2019 | Elizabeth Perkins | Sharp Objects | Jackie O'Neill | HBO |

=== 2020s ===
| Year | Actor | Role | Program | Network |
|---|---|---|---|---|
| 2020 | Toni Collette | Unbelievable | Det. Grace Rasmussen | Netflix |
| 2020 | Patricia Arquette | The Act | Dee Dee Blanchard | Hulu |
| 2020 | Marsha Stephanie Blake | When They See Us | Linda McCray | Netflix |
| 2020 | Niecy Nash | When They See Us | Delores Wise | Netflix |
| 2020 | Margaret Qualley | Fosse/Verdon | Ann Reinking | FX |
| 2020 | Emma Thompson | Years and Years | Vivienne Rook MP | HBO |
| 2020 | Emily Watson | Chernobyl | Ulana Khomyuk | HBO |
| 2021 | Uzo Aduba | Mrs. America | Shirley Chisholm | FX on Hulu |
| 2021 | Betsy Brandt | Soulmates | Caitlin Jones | AMC |
| 2021 | Marielle Heller | The Queen's Gambit | Alma Wheatley | Netflix |
| 2021 | Margo Martindale | Mrs. America | Bella Abzug | FX on Hulu |
| 2021 | Tracey Ullman | Mrs. America | Betty Friedan | FX on Hulu |
| 2021 | Winona Ryder | The Plot Against America | Evelyn Finkel | HBO |
| 2022 | Jennifer Coolidge | The White Lotus | Tanya McQuoid | HBO |
| 2022 | Kaitlyn Dever | Dopesick | Betsy Mallum | Hulu |
| 2022 | Kathryn Hahn | WandaVision | Agnes / Agatha Harkness | Disney+ |
| 2022 | Melissa McCarthy | Nine Perfect Strangers | Frances Welty | Hulu |
| 2022 | Julianne Nicholson | Mare of Easttown | Lori Ross | HBO |
| 2022 | Jean Smart | Mare of Easttown | Helen Fahey | HBO |
2023
| 2023 | Niecy Nash-Betts | Dahmer – Monster: The Jeffrey Dahmer Story | Glenda Cleveland | Netflix |
| 2023 | Claire Danes | Fleishman Is in Trouble | Rachel | FX |
| 2023 | Dominique Fishback | The Last Days of Ptolemy Grey | Robyn | Apple TV+ |
| 2023 | Betty Gilpin | Gaslit | Mo Dean | Starz |
| 2023 | Melanie Lynskey | Candy | Betty Gore | Hulu |
| 2023 | Juno Temple | The Offer | Bettye McCartt | Paramount+ |
2024
| 2024 | Maria Bello | Beef | Jordan Forster | Netflix |
| 2024 | Billie Boullet | A Small Light | Anne Frank | National Geographic |
| 2024 | Willa Fitzgerald | The Fall of the House of Usher | Young Madeline Usher | Netflix |
| 2024 | Aja Naomi King | Lessons in Chemistry | Harriet Sloane | Apple TV+ |
| 2024 | Mary McDonnell | The Fall of the House of Usher | Madeline Usher | Netflix |
| 2024 | Camila Morrone | Daisy Jones & The Six | Camila Alvarez-Dunne | Prime Video |
2025
| 2025 | Jessica Gunning | Baby Reindeer | Martha Scott | Netflix |
| 2025 | Dakota Fanning | Ripley | Marjorie "Marge" Sherwood | Netflix |
| 2025 | Leila George | Disclaimer | Young Catherine Ravenscroft | Apple TV+ |
| 2025 | Betty Gilpin | Three Women | Lina | Starz |
| 2025 | Deirdre O'Connell | The Penguin | Francis Cobb | HBO |
| 2025 | Kali Reis | True Detective | Detective Evangeline Navarro | HBO |
2026
| 2026 | Erin Doherty | Adolescence | Briony Ariston | Netflix |
| 2026 | Betty Gilpin | Death by Lightning | Lucretia Garfield | Netflix |
| 2026 | Marin Ireland | Devil in Disguise: John Wayne Gacy | Elizabeth Piest | Peacock |
| 2026 | Sophia Lillis | All Her Fault | Carrie Finch | Peacock |
| 2026 | Julianne Moore | Sirens | Michaela "Kiki" Kell | Netflix |
| 2026 | Christine Tremarco | Adolescence | Manda Miller | Netflix |

== Multiple wins and nominations ==
=== Multiple wins ===
2 wins

- Sarah Paulson

=== Multiple nominations ===
3 nominations

- Ellen Burstyn
- Betty Gilpin
- Sarah Paulson

2 nominations

- Regina King
- Niecy Nash-Betts
- Winona Ryder
- Jean Smart
- Emily Watson

== See also ==
- Golden Globe Award for Best Supporting Actress – Series, Miniseries or Television Film
- Primetime Emmy Award for Outstanding Supporting Actress in a Limited Series or Movie
