= World Breaker =

2025 UK film by Brad Anderson

- American theatrical release poster
- Directed by: Brad Anderson
- Written by: Joshua Rollins
- Produced by: Martin Brennan
- Starring: Luke Evans; Billie Boullet; Milla Jovovich
- Cinematography: Daniel Aranyó
- Edited by: Brian Philip Davis
- Music by: Matthew Rodgers
- Production companies: 23ten Productions; Gramercy Park Media; Peachtree Media Partners; Amasia Entertainment; Source Management and Production; Northern Ireland Screen; Dark Castle Entertainment; Sugar Studios; Studio 507
- Distributed by: Signature Entertainment (United Kingdom and Ireland); Aura Entertainment (United States)
- Release dates: November 5, 2025 (Philippines); January 30, 2026 (United States); March 7, 2026 (United Kingdom)
- Running time: 95 minutes
- Countries: United States; United Kingdom
- Language: English
- Box office: $189,608

World Breaker is a 2025 science fiction action horror film directed by Brad Anderson and written by Joshua Rollins. It stars Luke Evans, Billie Boullet and Milla Jovovich.

== Plot ==
The film opens to a scene of modern-day female soldiers in a battle, armed with firearms and swords, preparing to fight monsters known as "breakers" that emerge from an underground opening called the "stitch". The scene is narrated by an unknown voice that explains how the world has been broken many times throughout history. As the enemy gets close, the soldiers engage and the scene cuts to a cabin, where it is revealed that the opening scene and narration is a story being told by a father to his daughter Willa. It is also revealed that the soldiers' commander in the opening scene is Willa's mother.

It is further revealed that the breakers can turn men (and very rarely women as well) into "hybrids" merely by scratching or biting them. This leaves most men dead or turned; the remaining women take up arms and lead the fight against the breakers. The breakers are large multi-leg creatures. They can be slowed by bullets but can be most effectively killed by decapitation, leading to the use of swords.

After a breaker attack on their village, Willa and her father escape by boat to a remote island, where they survive on their own. A year later, while playing on the coast, Willa spots a girl running along the beach and warns the girl right before she is about to walk into a minefield. Willa calms the scared girl, then takes her into a nearby cave, where she had earlier set up a camp. The girl introduces herself as Rosie and tells Willa that she, her brother and her father were attacked on a boat in the ocean, and that her brother and father are now missing. Willa lies to Rosie and tells her that she is alone on the island. Willa then begins to secretly look after Rosie, bringing her food and sharing her father's stories.

One day during training, Willa's father collapses and falls unconscious due to early stages of starvation. It is revealed that the two have reached the end of their food supply, and unbeknownst to her, Willa's father had previously stopped eating in order to allow Willa to have the last of their food. After regaining consciousness, he deems Willa ready to survive on her own, and grants her his sword. Returning to the cave, Willa finds the camp a mess and Rosie missing. As she looks around, she sees Rosie, who is revealed to have turned into a hybrid. Rosie then lets out a loud shriek before attacking Willa. The two struggle briefly until Willa's father comes in and kills Rosie. Understanding that Rosie was calling to the breakers on the nearby mainland, thus now know where they are and will come for them, Willa and her father flee to the boat they arrived in.

Making their way to the boat, the two can hear the calls of pursuing breakers. They are attacked by Rosie's brother and father, both of whom have also become hybrids. Willa and her father kill them and continue towards the boat. Just before reaching the boat, however, her father reveals that he was bitten by one of the hybrids. The two say their tearful goodbyes to each other and he sends Willa on alone, saying that he will sacrifice himself to delay the other breakers for as long as he can. Willa reaches the boat, but she cannot push it into the water on the rotted slipway. She briefly despairs, but remembering one of her father's stories about always fighting no matter the odds, she draws her sword prepares to fight. Just then, several speed boats are seen behind her approaching the island. On board are armed soldiers, led by Willa's mother. They begin firing their machine guns at the advancing breakers, while Willa raises her sword and lets out a battle cry as the screen turns to black. The film then ends with Willa now narrating, like her father had in the beginning, saying that this is the story of how the world was NOT broken, implying she survived the island and has become the savior of the humans.

== Cast ==
- Luke Evans as Willa's father
- Billie Boullet as Willa
- Milla Jovovich as Willa's mother
- Mila Harris as Rosie
- Kevin Glynn as man at boat
- Charis Agbonlahor as soldier
- Chris Finlayson as Kodiak

== Production ==
In October 2023, Nat McCormick of The Exchange production company said that Brad Anderson would be directing a science fiction action film titled World Breaker, with Joshua Rollins writing the screenplay.

In February 2024, Luke Evans and Milla Jovovich joined the cast in undisclosed roles, and Billie Boullet was cast as their daughter the following month along with Mila Harris.

=== Filming ===
Principal photography began on March 13, 2024, in Northern Ireland, and wrapped on April 22.

== Release ==
In May 2024, Signature Entertainment acquired UK and Irish distribution rights to the film from the Exchange at the Marché du Film, planning to release the film sometime in 2025. The film was first released in the Philippines on November 5, 2025. Aura Entertainment released the film in the United States on January 30, 2026. Signature Entertainment released the film digitally in the United Kingdom on March 7.

== Reception ==
On the review aggregator website Rotten Tomatoes, 41% of 22 critics' reviews are positive, with an average rating of 5.1/10.

Nicholas Brooks of CBR gave the film a rating of 5/10 and he wrote: "World Breaker feels like half of a movie, or an extended short film that serves more as a teaser for this universe and its characters without much depth".

Ben Kenigsberg of The New York Times wrote a negative review of the film, simply saying that: "January movies don’t come duller".

Matthew Jackson of Bloody Disgusting rated the film 2.5/5 and wrote: "Like its lead character, a girl on the brink of battle, it’s a film trapped between inaction and the final charge, and we’re trapped right along with it".

Nathaniel Muir of AIPT gave positive feedback on the film and said: "Boullet and Evans are fine in their respective roles, but it always feels like the story has more to say. This is seen most in the final act of World Breaker".
