= Natalie Dormer =

English actress (born 1982)

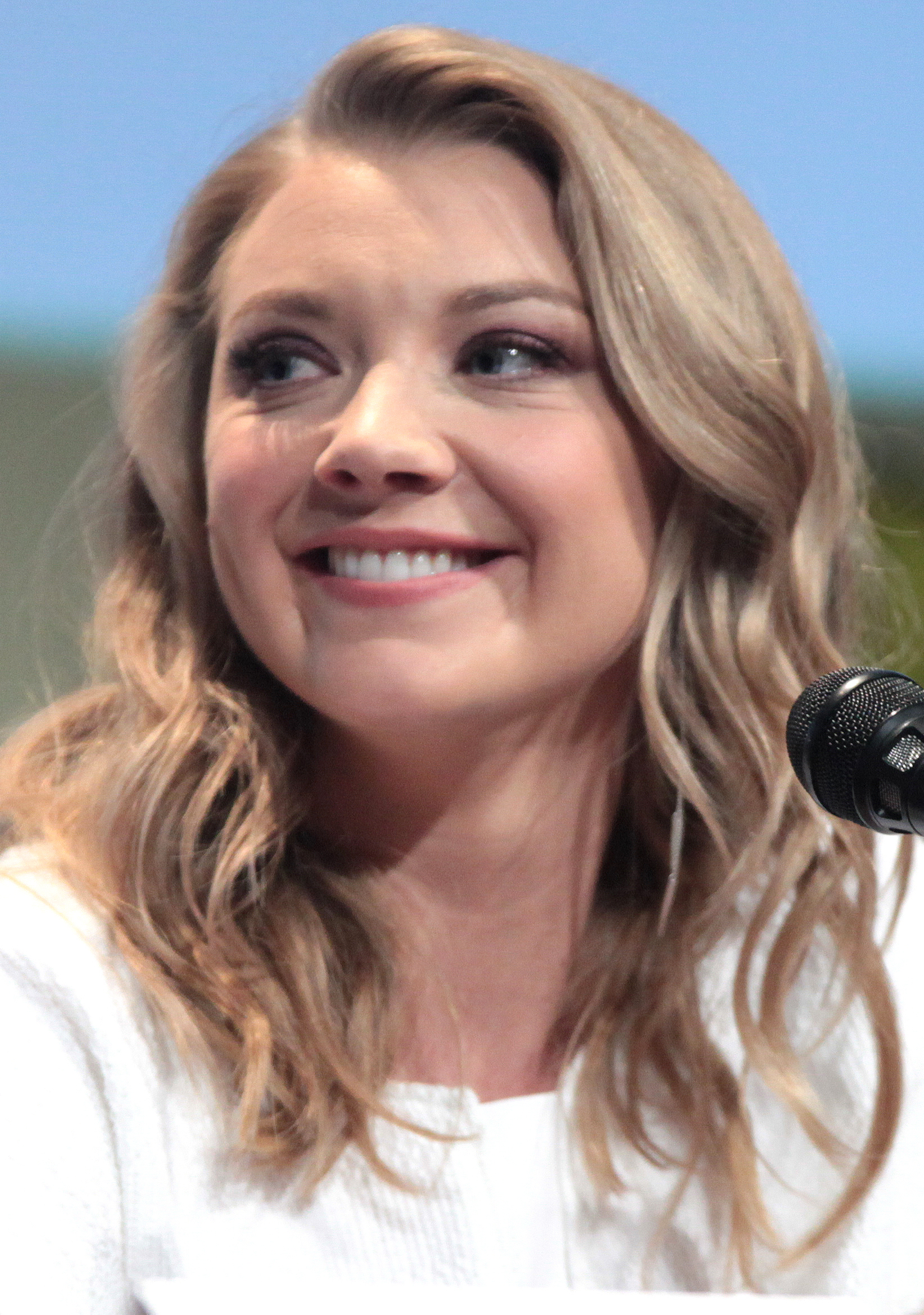
- Dormer in 2015
- Born: 11 February 1982 (age 44); Reading, Berkshire, England
- Education: Webber Douglas Academy of Dramatic Art
- Occupation: Actress
- Years active: 2005–present
- Partners: Anthony Byrne (2007–2018); David Oakes (2018–present)
- Children: 2

Natalie Dormer (born 11 February 1982) is an English actress. She is known for her roles in period films, blockbusters, independent films, as well as her work on prominent television series. Her accolades include winning an Empire Award, and receiving nominations for a Critics' Choice Award, two Gemini Awards, and two Screen Actors Guild Awards.

Dormer had her breakthrough playing the role of Anne Boleyn on the Showtime series The Tudors (2007–08), which earned her widespread acclaim. She made her stage debut in Sweet Nothings (2010) and portrayed Queen Elizabeth in Madonna's film W.E. (2011) and Private Lorraine in Captain America: The First Avenger (2011). Dormer then gained international attention for playing Margaery Tyrell on the HBO series Game of Thrones (2012–2016) and Cressida in the last two parts of The Hunger Games franchise (2014–2015), which rank as her highest-grossing films. She has also portrayed Irene Adler on the CBS series Elementary (2013–15) and Sara Price/Jess Price in The Forest (2016), and voiced Onica in the series The Dark Crystal: Age of Resistance (2019). She earned praise for her leading role in the miniseries Penny Dreadful: City of Angels (2020).

== Early life and education ==
Natalie Dormer was born in Reading, Berkshire, on 11 February 1982, the daughter of Gary Dormer and Claire Richards, and the sister of Mark and Samantha. She is of English, Norwegian, and Welsh descent.

She attended Chiltern Edge Secondary School before joining the sixth form at Reading Blue Coat School. She says she was bullied at school, but "still, to this day, can't place why".

While at school, Dormer trained in dance at the Allenova School of Dancing. She says she was the "academic hopeful" of the family and was provisionally offered a place to study history at the University of Cambridge, but on her A-level history examination, she did not achieve the A grade she needed, having misread a question. Dormer chose to audition for drama schools and trained at the Webber Douglas Academy of Dramatic Art in London.

== Career ==
=== 2005–2011: Early work and breakthrough ===
Six months after graduating from Webber Douglas, Dormer won the role of Victoria in Casanova. Her film debut, it was released in 2005. The director, Lasse Hallström, was so impressed with Dormer's comedic timing, that he had the scriptwriter expand her part. In 2005, Dormer had a small part in Distant Shores. After the filming of Casanova, Dormer was out of work for 10 months, which she ascribes to "bad representation". She was attached to an independent film, although financing caused delays. Removed from the audition circuit, Dormer worked as a waitress and in data entry. She says her out-of-work phase "was the best lesson".

I'm interested in playing women who feel real, who are fighting for something or desire something or are scared, as all real women are – or let's not make it a gender thing, as all human beings are.

— Dormer on her choice of roles

In 2007 and 2008, Dormer played Anne Boleyn in the first two seasons of The Tudors, for which she received highly positive reviews. Robert Abele of LA Weekly wrote: "Natalie Dormer presents a painterly exquisiteness and complexity in her portrayal of Anne Boleyn ... her enigmatic, time-halting loveliness is a boon for The Tudors, and damn near worth losing your head over". After her character's death at the end of the second season, The Boston Herald noted: "Dormer gave Anne Boleyn life, making her not just a beautiful schemer, but a rebellious, defiantly independent tragic hero in the tradition of Rebel Without a Cause and Cool Hand Luke... her departure from The Tudors leaves a tremendous void."

In 2008, Dormer played Moira Nicholson in Agatha Christie's Marple: "Why Didn't They Ask Evans?" and appeared in the film City of Life. Dormer's Marple appearance aired in the US in the summer of 2009 as part of the PBS Masterpiece Mystery anthology series. Also in that year, she appeared in Incendiary, but her scenes were cut from the final film. Following Marple, Dormer went on to film some new roles, including the Duchess of York in Madonna's film W.E., Pvt. Lorraine in Captain America: The First Avenger, and Niamh Cranitch in the BBC court drama Silk. She returned to The Tudors as Anne Boleyn in a dream sequence for the fourth and final season in mid-2010.

In March 2010, Dormer debuted at the Young Vic theatre in London as Mizi in the play Sweet Nothings. In The Observer, theatre critic Susannah Clapp praised the performances of the cast and wrote: "Natalie Dormer is lissome as a dirty, delightful gadabout, pushing aside an entire chess game to put down her hat". She received a commendation for her performance at the Ian Charleson Awards 2010. Her next stage role was Pat in .45 at Hampstead Theatre in November 2010.

=== 2012–2016: Worldwide recognition and praise ===
From 2012 to 2016, Dormer played Margaery Tyrell in the HBO fantasy TV series Game of Thrones. She received international recognition for the role, and she received critical acclaim for her performance. Dormer, along with the rest of the ensemble cast, was nominated for four Screen Actors Guild Award for Outstanding Performance by an Ensemble in a Drama Series in 2012, 2014, 2015, and 2016, and the cast was awarded the Empire Hero Award in 2015 by British film magazine Empire. For her performance in the third season of the show, Dormer won the Ewwy Award for Best Supporting Actress – Drama.

In March 2012, Dormer worked at the Young Vic to play the title role in After Miss Julie by Patrick Marber. Her performance earned acclaim, with reviews describing her as "little short of sensational", "outstanding", and "the perfect Miss Julie". The online theatre magazine Exeunt says her portrayal of Miss Julie contained "all the anger, desire, wit, loneliness, merriment, melancholy, and desperation of the casts of several plays together... Dormer has more presence and eerie beauty than is apparent from her appearances on-screen, and she shape-shifts almost supernaturally between seductress, child, and tormentor."

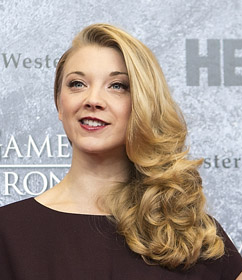
Dormer in 2013

In March 2013, she played the Lady Door in the radio play of Neverwhere, based on the novel by Neil Gaiman. Later that year, she appeared in the car racing drama Rush and the thriller The Counselor. She appeared in A Long Way From Home. In 2013, Dormer played Irene Adler in the final three episodes of the first season of the CBS series Elementary; she reprised the role in the second season. A November 2014 press-release said Dormer was to star as the scandalous 18th-century noblewoman Lady Worsley in a BBC drama called The Scandalous Lady W, based on the book Lady Worsley's Whim by the historian Hallie Rubenhold; it aired in August 2015. Dormer also played Cressida in the final two films in The Hunger Games franchise, which were released in 2014 and 2015. For the role, she shaved the left side of her head. Both films were financial successes, with the former grossing $755.4 million and the latter grossing $658.3 million, ranking as Dormer's highest grossing releases to date.

In August 2016, Dormer worked in The Professor and the Madman alongside Mel Gibson and Sean Penn. Dormer starred in the Lava Bear Films/David S. Goyer-produced horror film The Forest, directed by music video and short-film director Jason Zada as his feature film debut. Focus Features has the North American distribution rights to the film released in January 2016.

=== 2017–present: Other ventures and current work ===
In September 2014, Deadline Hollywood announced Dormer was cast in Screen Gems' action thriller Patient Zero, alongside Matt Smith and Game of Thrones co-star John Bradley. The film was directed by Oscar-winning filmmaker Stefan Ruzowitzky based on a script by Mike Le. Patient Zero was released through video on demand on 14 August 2018, before receiving a limited theatrical release on 14 September 2018, by Vertical Entertainment. A February 2017 press-release announced Dormer was cast as schoolteacher Mrs Hester Appleyard in Picnic at Hanging Rock, an adaptation of the 1967 Australian novel of the same name by Joan Lindsay. The six-episode feature aired on Amazon Prime and on BBC2 in the United Kingdom. Dormer's performance was described as "commanding" and "delicious".

...You couldn't make The Tudors now, exploit the female body like that. When I took [that role], I was 24 and just grateful to be on set. I didn't know I could query things, say if I felt uncomfortable. Now, I have some profile and influence on a project."

— Dormer in an interview with Suchandrika Chakrabarti for the New Statesman in November 2018

Dormer returned to the stage at the Theatre Royal Haymarket in October 2017 for the lead role in David Ives's Venus in Fur. The Telegraph described her performance as "sensational" while Lyn Gardner says Dormer was "dominant in every way". She co-wrote the film In Darkness, released in July 2018, with her ex-fiancé Anthony Byrne. Each describe writing together as "challenging". The film was criticised for scenes of "gratuitous nudity". During an interview with The Guardian, she says "There has to be sex in the power play of a thriller. We all got bodies, after all. In this film, the love-making scene is a metaphor for the way my character connects with the part played by Ed Skrein. Nakedness is a good equaliser, and the shower scene also shows the tattoos on my character's body and makes it clear she is not quite who you think."

Following her audio work on Neverwhere, an August 2018 press release announced Dormer would narrate the audiobook for Pottermore Publishing's Harry Potter: A History of Magic. Of the role, Dormer says she "always adored the Harry Potter books" and it was "fun to join the wizarding world family". In October 2018, she was announced as playing Vivien Leigh in miniseries Vivling. The series focuses on Leigh's classic films, including Gone with the Wind and A Streetcar Named Desire. Dormer was to develop and produce the show. In 2019, she was the voice of Onica in The Dark Crystal: Age of Resistance.

In December 2019, Dormer's production company, Dog Rose Productions, signed a multiyear, first-look deal with Fremantle. The Vivling miniseries will be Dormer's first production through the deal. In 2020, she starred in Showtime's series, Penny Dreadful: City of Angels, playing multiple roles; she received praise for her work on the series, and she was nominated for an award at the Critics' Choice Super Awards.

In 2024, Dormer starred in The Wasp alongside Naomie Harris and Dominic Allburn. They were each praised for "delivering powerful performances". Later that year, Dormer played Edie Hansen in the crime drama TV series White Lies, set in Cape Town, South Africa.

Dormer starred as Dr. Audrey Evans in 2025 movie Audrey's Children. Nell Minow described her performance as "committed" and praised her work with children in the movie. She also played the title role in a stage version revival of Anna Karenina at the Chichester Festival Theatre .

In 2026, Dormer played The Duchess of York in the television drama The Lady. Rod Liddle of The Sunday Times described her performance as excellent, although he wrote that "an intelligence shines out of her eyes that I have never espied in Ferguson herself". Dormer donated her fee to charity, saying, “Since completing the project, new information has come to light that makes it impossible for me to reconcile my values with Sarah Ferguson’s behaviour, which I believe is inexcusable. For that reason, I will not be taking part in the promotion of the project. In keeping with my commitment to the wellbeing of children.”

== Personal life ==
Dormer began a relationship with director Anthony Byrne in 2007 after meeting on the set of The Tudors. They became engaged in 2011. The couple collaborated on In Darkness. They ended their relationship in 2018.

Since 2018, Dormer has been in a relationship with English actor David Oakes, whom she met while appearing in Venus in Fur. She gave birth to their first daughter in January 2021. The couple entered into a civil partnership in February 2023 in Bath, Somerset. Dormer and Oakes have two daughters.

== Charity work and advocacy ==
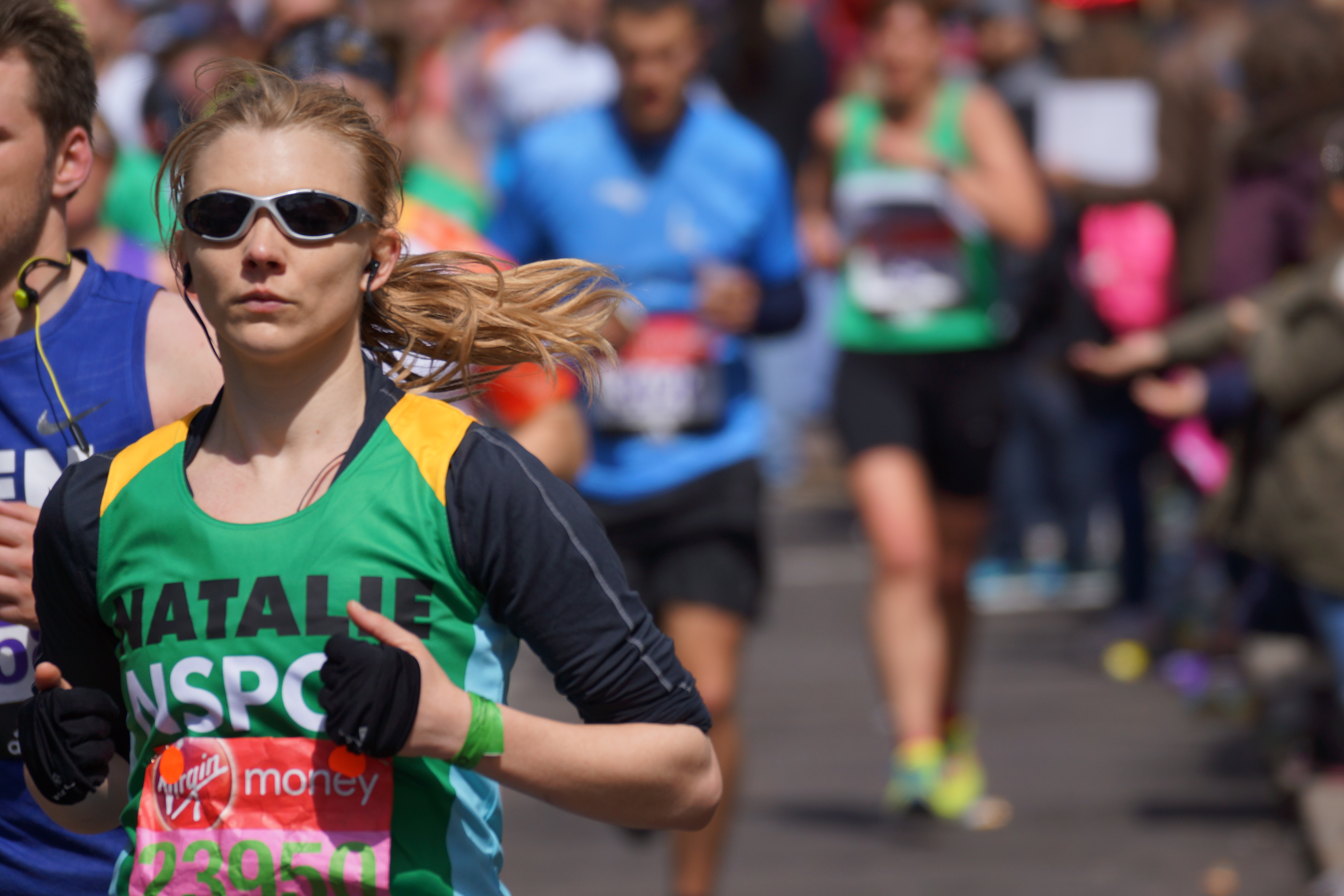
Dormer running the London Marathon in 2016

Dormer ran the London Marathon in 2014, in support of Barnardo's, and in 2016, this time alongside 900 other runners all in support of the NSPCC (The National Society for the Prevention of Cruelty to Children) and Childline. Since running the marathon, she has been heavily involved in supporting the work of the NSPCC in general, and Childline in particular.

On World Humanitarian Day in 2016, Dormer gave a speech at the United Nations headquarters to "highlight the plight of refugees". Dormer highlighted the violence suffered by women and girls, then demanded that men and boys be "engaged" in the conversation. In 2017, returning to her feminist roots, Dormer went on holiday to Tanzania with the development and humanitarian organisation Plan International to ban child marriage.

In a 2018 interview, Dormer said she does not use social media due to concern about being misquoted. Regarding her appearances in film and television where she performed nude, Dormer said, "To set the record straight, I have never been comfortable doing sex or nude scenes. Are you joking? How many people would be? My job specification is finding motivation in the text. I turned down roles involving sex, solely because of the way I am misrepresented. I'm terrified of perpetuating that clickbait image of me."

In 2019, Dormer was made the NSPCC ambassador for Childline and began her role by spending the night at the London Childline call centre. She supported the NSPCC Christmas Carol Service in 2020 and in August 2021 it was announced that she would be recording the audiobook for Pantosaurus and the Power Of PANTS, the NSPCC's book for children designed to give families an age-appropriate way of discussing consent.

In 2021, she appeared on the podcast of the founder of Childline, Dame Esther Rantzen, to support the charity, saying: "I genuinely believe, other than climate change, that children are the most important thing and it's an absolute scandal that we don't put our children first and foremost in everything... The NSPCC tagline that 'Every Childhood is Worth Fighting For'; I believe that so strongly." In 2024, she was made an honorary member of the NSPCC's council.

== Filmography ==
=== Film ===
List of Natalie Dormer film credits
Year	Title	Role	Notes
2005	Casanova	Victoria	
2007	Flawless	Cassie	
2009	City of Life	Olga	
2011	W.E.	Queen Elizabeth	
2011	Captain America: The First Avenger	Private Lorraine	
2012	Electric Cinema: How to Behave	Lauren Bacall	Short film
2013	A Long Way from Home	Suzanne	
2013	Rush	Nurse Gemma	
2013	The Counselor	The Blonde	
2013	The Brunchers	Her	Short films
2014	The Ring Cycle	Millie	Short films
2014	The Riot Club	Charlie	
2014	The Hunger Games: Mockingjay – Part 1	Cressida	
2015	The Hunger Games: Mockingjay – Part 2	Cressida	
2016	The Forest	Sara Price; Jess Price	
2016	The Roof	A Fan	Short film
2018	In Darkness	Sofia	Also writer and producer
2018	Patient Zero	Dr. Gina Rose	
2019	The Professor and the Madman	Eliza Merrett	
2019	Pets United	Belle (voice)	
2024	The Wasp	Carla	
2024	Audrey's Children	Audrey Evans	
TBA	The Big Fix †	TBA	Filming

Key
†	Denotes films that have not yet been released

=== Television ===
List of Natalie Dormer television credits
Year	Title	Role	Notes
2005	Distant Shores	Mobile Woman	Episode: #1.1
2005	Rebus	Phillippa Balfour	Episode: "The Falls"
2007–2008; 2010	The Tudors	Anne Boleyn	21 episodes
2009	Masterwork	Mo Murphy	Television film
2009	Agatha Christie's Marple	Moira Nicholson	Episode: "Why Didn't They Ask Evans?"
2011	Silk	Niamh Cranitch	6 episodes
2011	The Fades	Sarah Etches	6 episodes
2011	Poe	Celeste Chevalier	Television film
2012–2016	Game of Thrones	Margaery Tyrell	26 episodes
2013–2015	Elementary	Jamie Moriarty / Irene Adler	6 episodes
2015	The Scandalous Lady W	Seymour Worsley	Television film
2018	Picnic at Hanging Rock	Mrs. Hester Appleyard	6 episodes
2019	The Dark Crystal: Age of Resistance	Onica (voice)	3 episodes
2020	Penny Dreadful: City of Angels	Magda / Elsa / Alex / Rio	Main cast, 10 episodes
2024	White Lies	Edie Hansen	Main cast, 8 episodes and also executive producer
2024	Inside No. 9	Lillian	Episode: "The Curse of the Ninth"
2026	The Lady	Sarah, Duchess of York	Main cast, 4 episodes

=== Video games ===
List of Natalie Dormer video game credits
Year	Title	Voice role	Notes
2014–2015	Game of Thrones	Margaery Tyrell	Based on the TV series of the same name
2017	Mass Effect: Andromeda	Dr. Lexi T'Perro	

=== Music videos ===
List of Natalie Dormer music video credits
Year	Title	Artist
2015	"Someone New"	Hozier
2020	"No Day Shall Erase You"	Fabio D'Andrea

== Stage ==
List of Natalie Dormer stage credits
Year	Title	Role	Notes
2003	The Comedy of Errors	Adriana	The Cliveden Open Air Theatre
2010	Sweet Nothings	Mizi	Young Vic
2010	.45	Pat	Hampstead Theatre
2012	After Miss Julie	Miss Julie	Young Vic
2017	Venus in Fur	Vanda Jordan	Theatre Royal Haymarket
2025	Anna Karenina	Anna Karenina	Chichester Festival Theatre

== Accolades ==
List of awards and nominations received by Natalie Dormer
Year	Association	Category	Work	Result
2008	Monte-Carlo TV Festival	Outstanding Actress – Drama Series	The Tudors	Nominated
2008	Gemini Awards	Best Performance by an Actress in a Continuing Leading Dramatic Role	The Tudors	Nominated
2009	Gemini Awards	Best Performance by an Actress in a Continuing Leading Dramatic Role	The Tudors	Nominated
2013	EWwy Awards	Best Supporting Actress – Drama	Game of Thrones	Won
2014	NewNowNext Awards	Best New Lead Film Actress	The Hunger Games: Mockingjay – Part 1	Won
2014	Screen Actors Guild Awards	Outstanding Performance by an Ensemble in a Drama Series (shared with the cast)	Game of Thrones	Nominated
2015	Screen Actors Guild Awards	Outstanding Performance by an Ensemble in a Drama Series (shared with the cast)	Game of Thrones	Nominated
2015	Empire Awards	Best Ensemble	Game of Thrones	Won
2019	The Equity Ensemble Awards	Outstanding Performance by an Ensemble in a Mini-series or Telemovie	Picnic at Hanging Rock	Nominated
2020	CinEuphoria Awards	Merit – Honorary Award	Game of Thrones	Won
2021	Critics' Choice Super Awards	Best Actress in a Horror Series	Penny Dreadful: City of Angels	Nominated
