= Billie Boullet =

British-French actress (born 2005)

- Born: Billie Aimee Boullet; 5 April 2005 (age 21); Brent, London, England
- Education: ArtsEd
- Occupation: Actress
- Years active: 2020–present

Billie Aimee Boullet (born 5 April 2005) is a British actress. She began her career in the CBBC series The Worst Witch (2020). Her performance as Anne Frank in the National Geographic miniseries A Small Light (2023) earned her a Critics' Choice Award nomination. She has since starred in the Netflix series Man on Fire (2026).

== Early life and education ==
Boullet was born in the North West London Borough of Brent. She grew up in Paris before returning to England in 2014. She took acting, dance and musical theatre classes at the Rare Studio in Liverpool. She completed her acting training at ArtsEd in West London.

== Career ==
Boullet made her television debut in 2020 when she joined the cast of the CBBC adaptation of The Worst Witch for its fourth and final season as Fenella Feverfew. In June 2022, it was announced Boullet would portray Anne Frank in the biographical miniseries A Small Light, which aired in 2023 on National Geographic, Hulu, and Disney+. She initially auditioned for the role of Anne's sister Margot, who would eventually be played by Ashley Brooke. Boullet used Frank's diary as the basis for her performance. For the role, Boullet was nominated for the Critics' Choice Award for Best Supporting Actress in a Miniseries.

== Filmography ==
Year	Title	Role	Notes
2020	The Worst Witch	Fenella Feverfew	Main role (series 4)
2023	A Small Light	Anne Frank	Main role, miniseries
2026	World Breaker	Willa	Film debut
2026	Man on Fire	Poe Rayburn	Main role
