= Pediatric Blood & Cancer =

- Discipline: Pediatric oncology, hematology
- Language: English
- Edited by: Peter E. Newburger

Publication details
- Former name(s): Medical and Pediatric Oncology
- History: 1975-present
- Publisher: John Wiley & Sons
- Frequency: 14/year
- Open access: Hybrid
- Impact factor: 3.838 (2021)

Standard abbreviations
- ISO 4: Pediatr. Blood Cancer

Indexing
- CODEN: PBCEAQ
- ISSN: 1545-5009 (print); 1545-5017 (web)
- LCCN: 2003215320
- OCLC no.: 884083773

Links
- Journal homepage; Online access; Online archive

Pediatric Blood & Cancer is a peer-review online-only medical journal covering pediatric oncology and hematology. It was established in 1975 as Medical and Pediatric Oncology, obtaining its current name in 2004. Starting in January 2014, it stopped publishing its print edition and moved to an exclusively online format. The editor-in-chief is Peter E. Newburger (University of Massachusetts Medical School). According to the Journal Citation Reports, the journal has a 2021 impact factor of 3.838, ranking it 30th out of 130 journals in the category "Pediatrics", 39th out of 78 journals in the category "Hematology", and 141st out of 245 journals in the category "Oncology".
