= Ami Canaan Mann =

American film director

- Born: 1969 (age 56–57)
- Citizenship: UK; US
- Occupations: Film director; television director; television writer
- Years active: 2000–present
- Father: Michael Mann
- Website: Ami Canaan Mann

Ami Canaan Mann (born 1969) is a British-born American film director, television director and television writer.

== Career ==
Mann has worked as a television and film writer since writing the NYPD Blue episode "Tea and Sympathy" in 2000. She has won three awards, all in 2001 for her first film as a director, Morning. These included the Audience Award at Dahlonega International Film Festival, Grand Prize for best directorial debut and Gold Award for Independent Theatrical Feature Films – First Feature.

Her 2011 film, Texas Killing Fields, screened in competition at the 68th Venice International Film Festival in September. Jackie & Ryan, her romance film starring Katherine Heigl and Ben Barnes, screened in the Horizons section at the 71st Venice International Film Festival.

== Personal life ==
Mann is the daughter of director Michael Mann.

== Filmography ==
=== Films ===
Year	Title
2001	Morning
2011	Texas Killing Fields
2014	Jackie & Ryan
2016	Great Performers: L.A. Noir
2024	Audrey's Children

=== Television ===
Year	Title
2000	NYPD Blue Tea and Sympathy
2002	Nancy Drew
2003	Robbery Homicide Division
2010	Friday Night Lights
2012	Dakota
2015	The Blacklist
2016	Chicago Med
2016	No Tomorrow
2017	APB
2017	Shots Fired
2017	Queen of the South
2018	Sneaky Pete
2018–19	Cloak & Dagger
2018	Power
2018	Shooter
2018	House of Cards
2018	A Million Little Things
2018	Marvel's Runaways
2019	Deadly Class
2019	Looking for Alaska
2022	In From the Cold
