= Juan Moreno =

Juan Moreno may refer to:

- Juan Moreno (pitcher) (born 1975), relief pitcher in Major League Baseball
- Juan Carlos Moreno (baseball) (born 1975), Cuban shortstop
- Juan Carlos Moreno (Spanish footballer)
- Juan Carlos Moreno (Argentine footballer)
- Juan Carlos Moreno Poggio (1982–2025), Uruguayan agricultural technician and politician
- Juan Moreno y Herrera-Jiménez, better known as Jean Reno, French and Spanish actor
- Juan Moreno Yagüe (born 1973), Spanish lawyer, activist and politician
- Juan Moreno (taekwondo) (born 1971), American taekwondo practitioner
- Juan Isidro Moreno (1924–2015), poet from the Dominican Republic
- Juan Gabriel Moreno (born 1965), Colombian/American architect
- Juan Manuel Moreno (born 1970), Spanish politician
- Juan Moreno (footballer) (Juan Moreno Fernández, born 1997), Spanish footballer
- Juan Moreno (journalist) (born 1972), Spanish journalist, wrote Tausend Zeilen Lüge
