= Juan Carlos Moreno =

Juan Carlos Moreno may refer to:

- Juan Carlos Moreno Poggio (1982–2025), Uruguayan agricultural technician and politician
- Juan Carlos Moreno (baseball)
- Juan Carlos Moreno (Spanish footballer)
- Juan Carlos Moreno (Argentine footballer)

== See also ==
- Juan Moreno (disambiguation)
