= Marie Burchard =

German actress

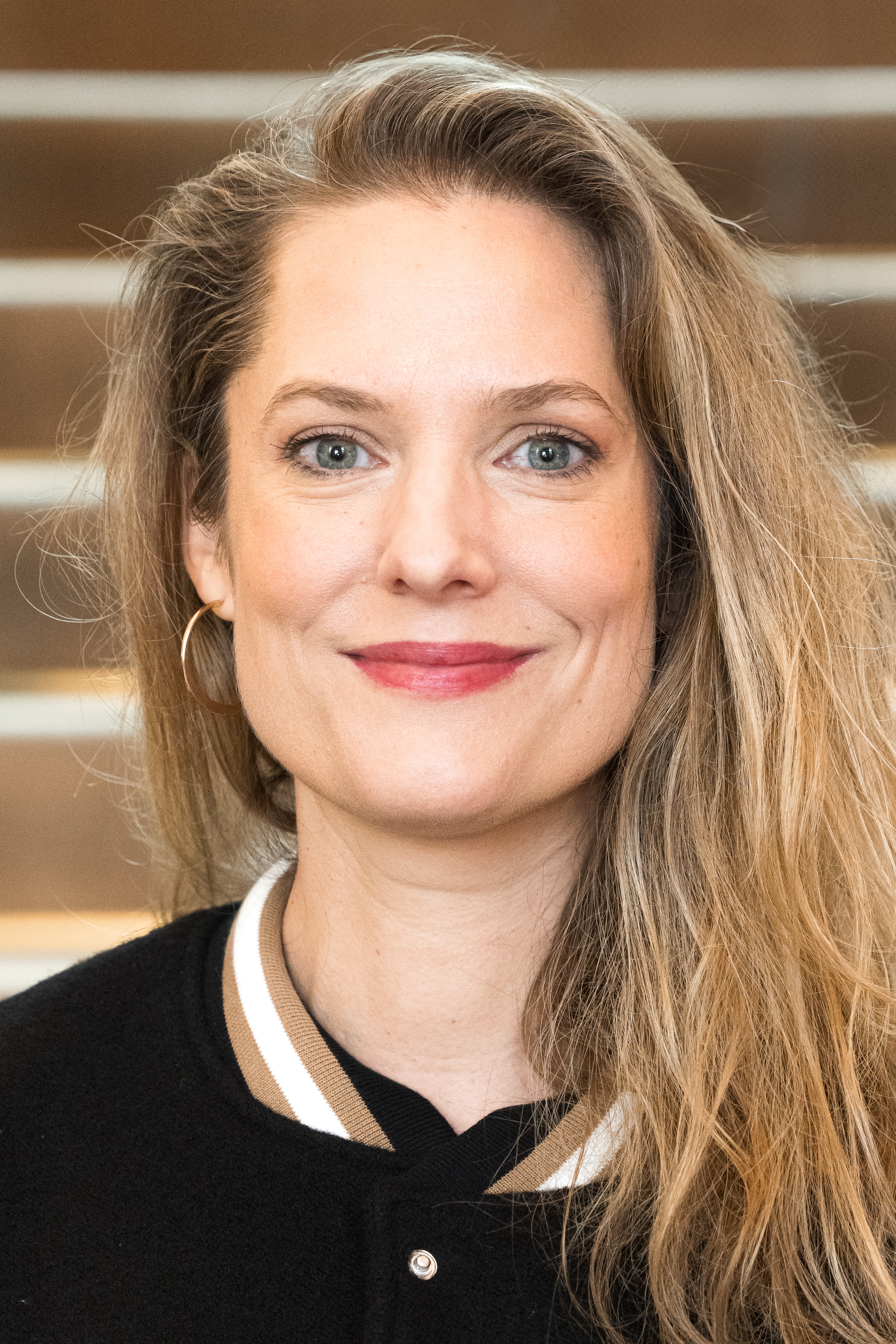
Marie Burchard (2024)

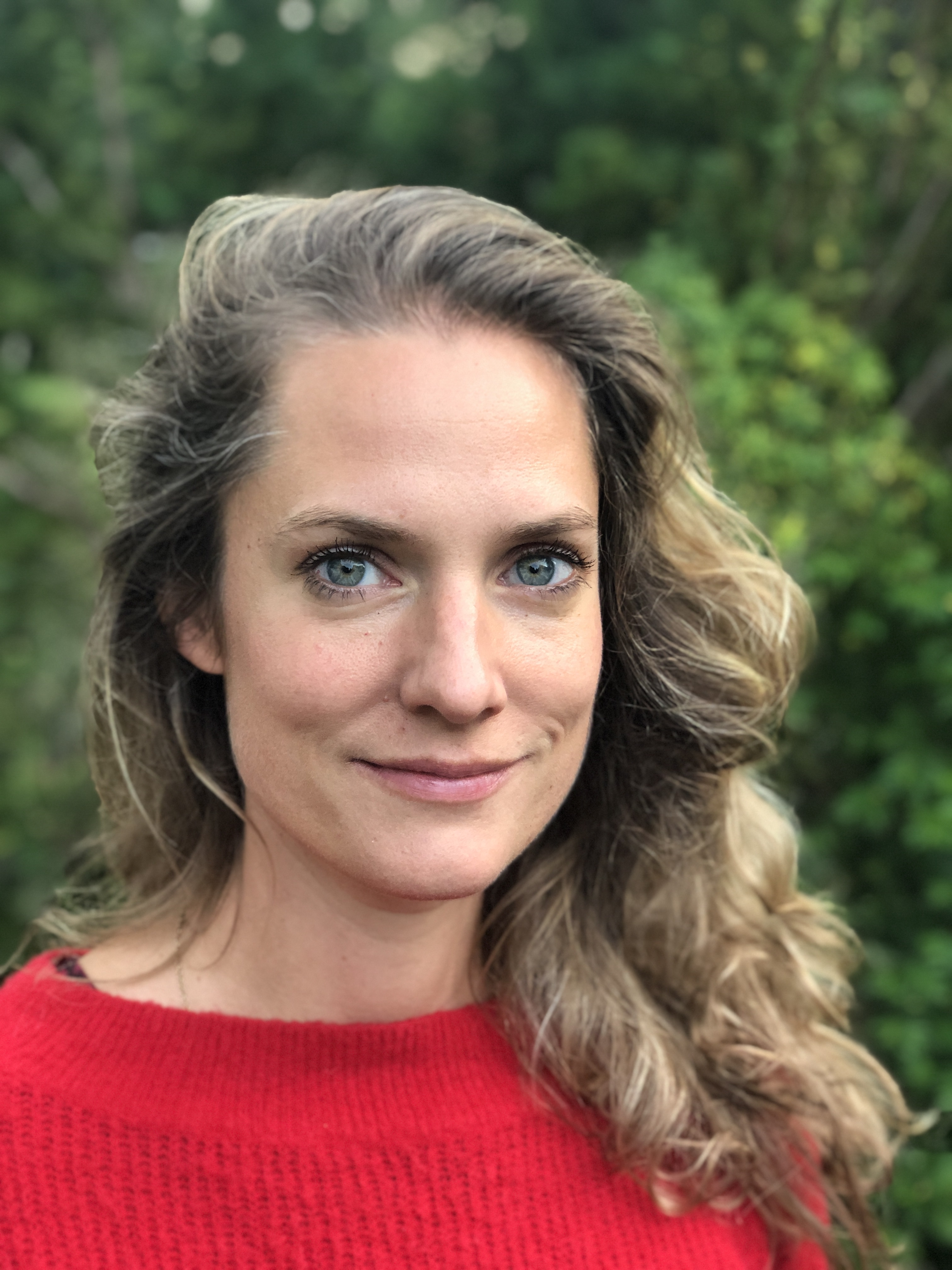
Marie Burchard (2020)

Marie Burchard (born 1982), is a German stage and screen actress.

== Life and career ==
Marie Caroline Burchard was born in Bonn, Germany and grew up in France. She was educated at the German School in Paris and studied drama at the Hochschule für Schauspielkunst Ernst Busch in Berlin, where she met her husband, actor Sebastian Schwarz.

She rose to fame for her role as Dunja in Andrea Breth’s rendition of Dostoyevsky’s Crime and Punishment at the 2008 Salzburg Festival. In 2009, Breth cast Burchard in the role of Eve, the female lead in Kleist’s The Broken Jug. At the Schaubühne, Berlin, Marie Burchard took on numerous lead roles, including in Marius von Mayenburg’s comedy Stück Plastik (2015), Stefan Zweig’s Beware of Pity (adapted and directed by Simon McBurney for the Barbican, London 2017) and Ödön von Horvath’s Italian Night, directed by Thomas Ostermeier, 2018).

In 2022, Marie Burchard appeared alongside Florian David Fitz and Senta Berger in the highly acclaimed comedy drama Oskars Kleid, where she played the mother of a nine-year old boy, who decides to be a girl. Oskars Kleid received the Bambi Award 2023 for best film. Her next film was Michael Bully Herbig’s A Thousand Lines, where Burchard starred alongside Elyas M'Barek. The film centers on the case of former Der Spiegel journalist Claas Relotius. From 2018 to 2021, Marie Burchard played alongside her sister, the actress Bettina Burchard, in the RTL comedy Sankt Maik.

== Personal life ==
Marie Burchard is married to the German actor Sebastian Schwarz. They live in Berlin and have two children. Burchard is also the great-niece of modernist architect and Bauhaus-founder Walter Gropius and the sister of actress Bettina Burchard and art historian and curator Wolf Burchard.
