= A Thousand Lines =

- Theatrical release poster
- German: Tausend Zeilen
- Directed by: Michael "Bully" Herbig
- Screenplay by: Hermann Florin
- Based on: Tausend Zeilen Lüge by Juan Moreno
- Produced by: Sebastian Werninger; Hermann Florin
- Starring: Elyas M'Barek; Jonas Nay
- Cinematography: Torsten Breuer
- Edited by: Alexander Dittner
- Music by: Ralf Wengenmayr
- Production companies: UFA Fiction; Warner Bros. Film Productions Germany; Feine Filme
- Distributed by: Warner Bros. Pictures
- Release date: 22 September 2022 (Germany)
- Running time: 93 minutes
- Country: Germany
- Language: German
- Box office: $2 million

A Thousand Lines (German: Tausend Zeilen) is a 2022 German satirical biographical drama film directed by Michael "Bully" Herbig. It stars Elyas M'Barek as a journalist who notices inconsistencies in his coworker's reporting. When management dismisses his suspicions as jealousy, he sets out to expose his colleague using journalistic means. The film is based on the 2019 book Tausend Zeilen Lüge by Juan Moreno, which centers on the case of former Der Spiegel journalist Claas Relotius.

== Cast ==
- Elyas M'Barek as Juan Romero
- Jonas Nay as Lars Bogenius
- Marie Burchard as Anne Romero
- Michael Ostrowski as Milo
- Jörg Hartmann as Christian Eichner
- Michael Maertens as Rainer M. Habicht
- Sara Fazilat as Yasmin Saleem
- Jeff Burrell as Jack Webber
- Kurt Krömer
- Ibrahim Al-Khalil as Jamal
- David Baalcke as Sören Osterom
- Christian David Gebert as Eloise
- Christian Heiner Wolf as lawyer
- Katrin Schmölz as female receptionist
- Marcus Morlinghaus as André Jung

== See also ==
- Shattered Glass (2003), another film about the same topic
