= Henry Ormond =

German judge and lawyer (1901–1973)

Henry Lewis Ormond
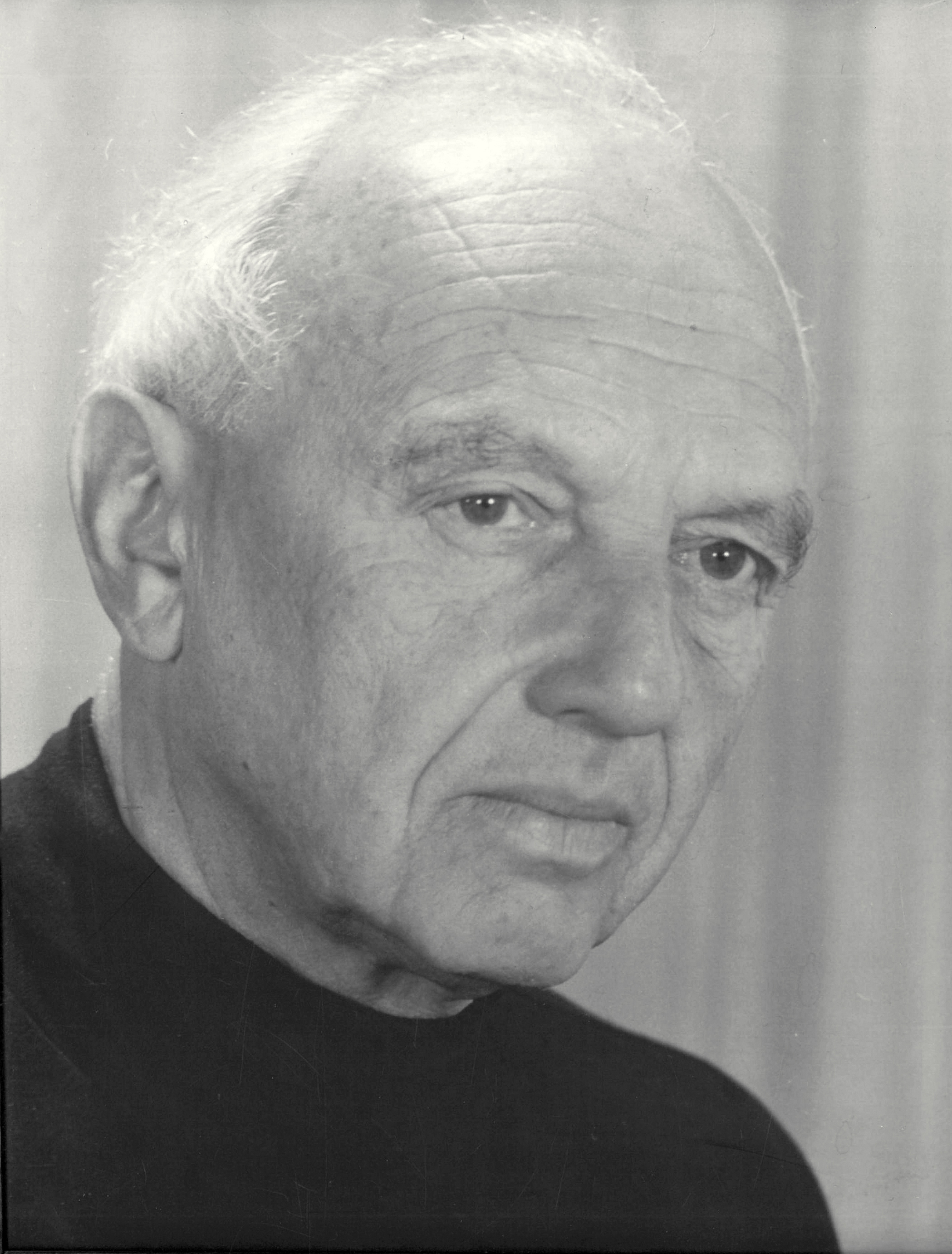
- Henry Ormond circa 1967
- Born: Hans Ludwig Jacobsohn; 27 May 1901; Kassel, Germany
- Died: 8 May 1973 (aged 71)
- Citizenship: German, British
- Education: Heidelberg University
- Occupation: Lawyer

Henry Ormond (born Hans Ludwig Jacobsohn, after adoption in 1920 Hans Ludwig Oettinger; 27 May 1901 – 8 May 1973) was a German lawyer of Jewish descent. In 1946/47, as a British press officer, he was one of the founding fathers of the German news magazine Der Spiegel. Later, as a lawyer, he represented Holocaust victims before German courts.

== Early years ==
Born in Kassel as Hans Ludwig Jacobsohn, he attended school in Mannheim and studied law at Heidelberg University and in Berlin. After passing his exams in 1926, he was appointed judge at the Mannheim District Court.

After Adolf Hitler's rise to power the National Socialists retired all judges of Jewish descent in May 1933 which included Hans Ludwig Oettinger.

The following years he worked as legal adviser for a coal wholesaler in Frankfurt am Main. In 1938 he was also dismissed there as a ‘non-Aryan’.

On 12 November 1938, the Gestapo arrested him in the course of the November pogroms and deported him to Dachau concentration camp. In mid-March 1939, he was released with frostbites on both hands on condition to leave Germany.

== Emigration ==
In summer of 1939, he managed to emigrate to Great Britain via Switzerland where he found refuge in an English vicarage. He was interned as an ‘enemy alien’ on the Isle of Man and in Canada in May 1940 from where he was released after 14 months. While still in Canada he volunteered for the British Army in July 1941. There he served in the Pioneer Corps, mostly with guard and office duties in England and from August 1944 in France. In July 1943, he took the name Henry Lewis Ormond.

At the end of the war, he returned to Germany as a British occupation officer. With the Information Services Division Ormond initially worked in Hanover as press officer with the rank of staff sergeant and, together with John Seymour Chaloner, Harry Bohrer and Rudolf Augstein, was one of the founders of the weekly magazine Diese Woche, which changed title to Der Spiegel after six issues in 1947.

== Advocate for victims of the Holocaust ==
In April 1950, Ormond set up as a lawyer in Frankfurt am Main and focussed his work on compensation and restitution proceedings for Nazi victims and on the prosecution of Nazi perpetrators. He represented Norbert Wollheim in the first test case of forced labourers against I.G. Farben, in which he sued for reimbursement of withheld wages and damages. After almost two years of proceedings, the court ruled in Wollheim's favour and ordered I.G. Farben to pay DM 10,000 in 1953. The proceedings before the Frankfurt am Main Court of Appeal (Oberlandesgericht Frankfurt am Main) ended in 1958 with a settlement between I.G. Farben on the one hand and Wollheim and the Conference on Jewish Material Claims Against Germany on the other: A total of DM 30 million was paid to former forced labourers of I. G. Farben in the Auschwitz-Monowitz concentration camp.

Henry Ormond represented Nazi victims and their relatives as joint plaintiffs in numerous criminal trials. In the first Auschwitz trial from 1963 to 1965 he represented 15 joint plaintiffs. On 8 June 1964, when the trial had been running for six months, Ormond applied for an on-site visit to Auschwitz. Despite objections from the Hessian State Ministry of Justice and the federal one - there were no diplomatic relations between Poland and West Germany at the time - the inspection was carried out on 14 December 1964 after Poland had agreed to the site visit. According to reports by observers, the inspection of the crime scene had a lasting effect on those involved in the trial and on the German public.

In addition to his work as legal counsel for Nazi victims, Henry Ormond was also active in aid organisations for Israel.

Henry Ormond died of a heart attack during a speech in the courtroom in 1973.

== Estate ==
Henry Ormond's estate is kept mainly in the archives of the Fritz Bauer Institute in Frankfurt am Main. Other parts can be found at the Institute of Contemporary History in Munich and at the Yad Vashem memorial in Jerusalem.

== Selected bibliography ==
- Zwischenbilanz im Auschwitz-Prozeß. In: Tribüne Vol. 3, 1964, p. 1183-1190.
- Rückblick auf den Auschwitz-Prozess. In: Tribüne. Vol. 4, 1965, p. 1723-1728.
- Plädoyer im Auschwitz-Prozess von Henry Ormond am 24.5.1965. München 1965.
- Replik des Rechtsanwalts Henry Ormond im Auschwitz-Prozess. In: Frankfurter Hefte. Vol. 20, 1965, p. 827-837.
- Auschwitz-Ausstellung Hannover vom 17. November 1965 bis 14. Dezember 1965. Ansprache in der Feierstunde zur Eröffnung der Auschwitz-Ausstellung am Mittwoch, dem 17. November 1965. Hanover 1965.
- Von der Ideologie der Unmenschlichkeit zur Lüge vom Befehlsnotstand. In: Henry Ormond, Gerd-Klaus Kaltenbrunner: Rassenmystik, Mordpraxis, Neonazismus. München 1967, p. 1-37.
- Nazi crime and German law. In: The Wiener Library bulletin. Vol. 21, 1967, Nr. 1, p. 16-21.
