= Melanie Amann =

German journalist, author and lawyer

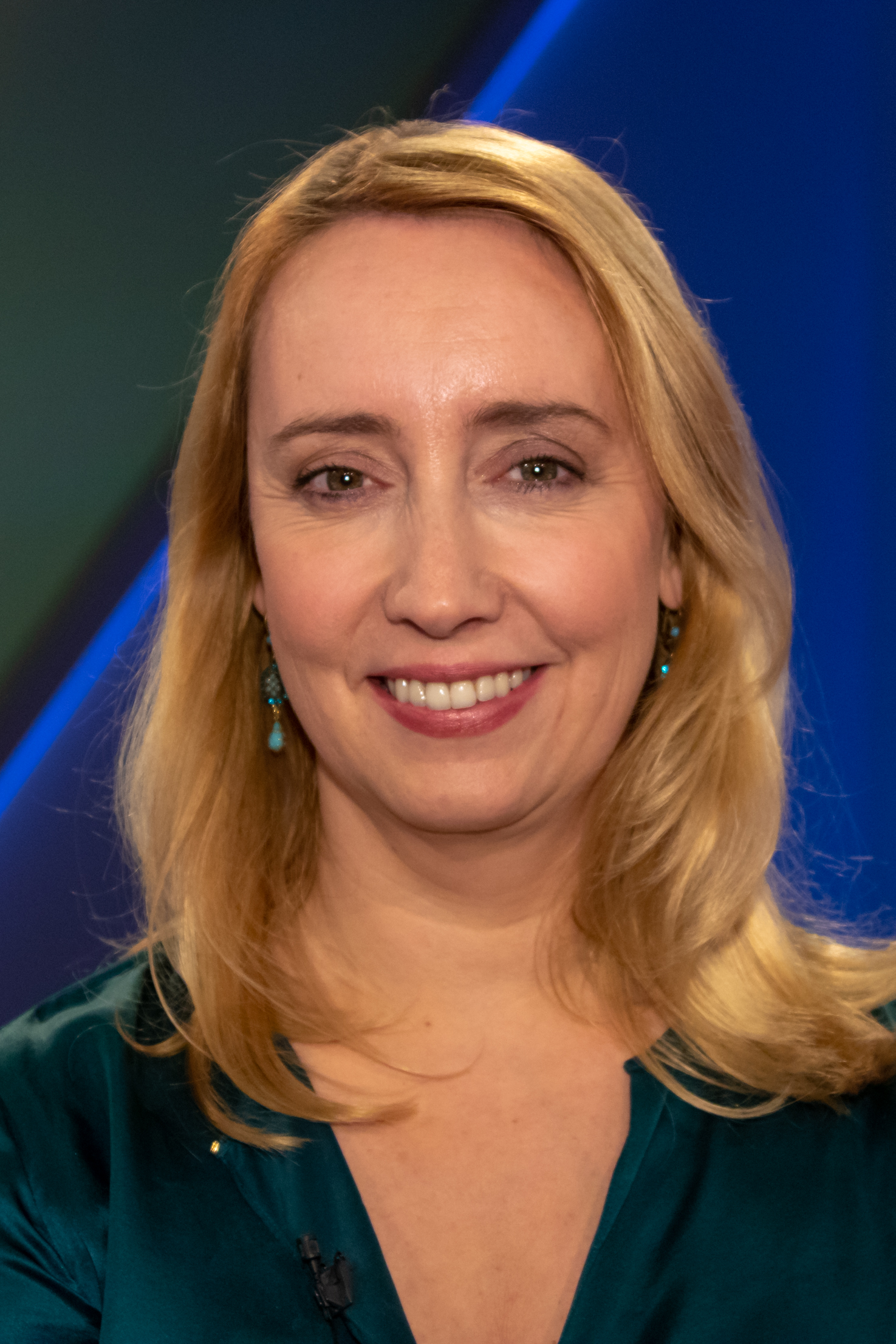
- Amann at the talk show maischberger in 2019
- Born: 18 May 1978 (age 48); Bonn
- Education: University of Trier, Aix-Marseille University, Deutsche Journalistenschule, LMU Munich
- Occupations: Jurist, journalist, economic journalist
- Employers: Spiegel-Verlag (2013–2025); Financial Times Deutschland; Frankfurter Allgemeine Zeitung (2006–2013)
- Website: www.melanieamann.de

Melanie Amann (born 18 May 1978) is a German journalist and lawyer. She was deputy editor-in-chief of leading Germany weekly Der Spiegel until 1 January 2026

== Education and career ==
Amann was born in Bonn and raised in Siegburg. She studied law at the University of Trier, Aix-Marseille III and at Humboldt University of Berlin. After graduating in law (Erstes juristisches Staatsexamen), Amann studied journalism at Deutsche Journalistenschule in Munich. She worked for Bonner General-Anzeiger and Süddeutsche Zeitung. Amann wrote as editor for Financial Times Deutschland mainly about issues in the middle east. In 2006, she joined Frankfurter Allgemeinen Zeitung and wrote mainly on issues concerning employment law.

In 2011, she received a Ph.D. in law from Ludwig-Maximilians-Universität München for a dissertation on the law of union elections.

She joined Der Spiegel in 2013, covering center-right party CDU/CSU and the then-rising right-wing populist Alternative for Germany (AfD). In 2019, she became head of the Berlin office. In May 2021, the magazine announced that Amann and Thorsten Dörting would join then-current editor-in-chief Clemens Höges to form an editorial triumvirate. After Höges left the magazine, the current editor-in-chief Dirk Kurbjuweit appointed Amann and Dörting as his deputies in October 2023.

Following the new editor-in-chief Kurbjuweit, she was engaged in a power struggel. The conflict was triggered by Kurbjuweit’s decision, made shortly after his appointment in May 2023, to strip Amann of her editorial responsibility for political coverage and remove her from her position as head of the Berlin bureau. Later, she was also required to relinquish her role in coordinating investigative reporting. Within the leadership team, Amann was seen as an advocate for the magazine’s future in the digital realm. She pushed for greater integration and equal standing between print and digital content. In September 2025 Amann left Spiegel.

Amann is a regular guest on political talkshows such as Markus Lanz or Anne Will, and appears in English-language shows such as NPR's All Things Considered in the United States.

Since January 2026 she is woking for German publisher Funke Mediengruppe. Since May 2026, she has been the host of the podcast "Amann Unframed."

== Published books ==
- Die Belegschaftsabstimmung. Schriften zum Arbeitsrecht und Wirtschaftsrecht, Band 73. Peter Lang, Frankfurt am Main u. a. 2012, ISBN 978-3-631-63279-6.
- Angst für Deutschland. Die Wahrheit über die AfD: Wo sie herkommt, wer sie führt, wohin sie steuert. (Fear for Germany. The truth about the AfD: where they come from, who leads it, where it heads.) Droemer, München 2018, ISBN 978-3-426-27763-8.
