= Abir Haddad =

Iraqi-German lawyer and public speaker

Abir Haddad (born March 4, 1985) is a lawyer, TedX speaker, legal futurist, and founder of the Institute of Legal Transformation. She is also an adjunct associate professor at the University of Cologne, where she teaches the law of Arab countries.

== Life ==
Abir Haddad was born on March 4, 1985, in Baghdad and came to Europe as an unaccompanied minor refugee. She speaks three languages fluently: Arabic, German, and English, and she founded the Institute of legal Transformation in Bonn, Germany. Her other focus is the rapid change in technology. She advocates for the need to change the way law is perceived and constructed, for example, in the process of regulating Artificial Intelligence and Blockchain. Influenced by her experiences with Bedouin tribes, she is vocal about climate protection, sustainability, and the rights of nature itself.

== Education and career ==
After she graduated from high school, Abir Haddad studied law at the University of Tübingen, where she got her first state exam. She earned her doctorate (summa cum laude) in 2022 from the University of Cologne, focusing on comparative law and specifically the assignment of claims in the law of Arab countries. Her time writing the doctoral thesis included research visits to Japan, Bahrain, the UAE, and the UK. After her doctorate she began working as a consultant for Legal Transformation at the United Nations. Since 2021, she has been an adjunct associate professor at the University of Cologne, where she teaches modern law of Arab countries.

In May 2022, Abir Haddad founded the Institute of Legal Transformation, which she is the director of. She also initiated and co-founded a network for multicultural lawyers in Germany.

== Awards ==
In 2021, Abir Haddad was named one of Capital Magazine's 40 under 40. In 2022 she was fellow of the female science talents of the Falling Walls Foundation. She won the Strive Sustainability Award in 2025 and in the same year, became a Skoll Fellow.

== Publications ==
=== Doctorate Thesis ===
Die Forderungsabtretung im Recht arabischer Länder Zwischen Wirtschaftsliberalismus und Schuldnerschutz. Dissertation, Universität zu Köln.

=== Other publications ===
Balancing Tradition and Reform — Saudi Arabia’s New Civil Transactions Law_{;} in Arab Law Quarterly; written by: Abir Haddad, Kai Kreutzberger and Lida Fagiri, published June 17, 2023.

Rezension zu Abdurrahim Kozali/ Ibrahim Salama/ Souheil Thabti (Hgg.): Das islamische Wirtschaftsrecht (Reihe für Osnabrücker Islamstudien 19). Zeitschrift für Recht & Islam (ZR&I) - Journal of Law & Islam, Vol. 12 [2020] · 1. Mai 2020.

High Court of England & Wales, Commercial Court: A Ṣukūk-al- muḍāraba Structured to Provide a Fixed Return and Alleged to Be Illegal under UAE Law Will not Be Unwound for Illegality. Dana Gas PJSC v Dana Gas Sukuk Limited and others [2017]; Kai Kreutzberger & Abir Haddad in Journal for Law & Islam.
