= Ferdinand Simoneit =

German journalist (1925–2010)

- Born: 14 June 1925; Duisburg, Germany
- Died: 3 April 2010; Löffingen, Germany
- Occupation(s): Journalist, author, professor and World War II veteran

Ferdinand Simoneit (14 June 1925; Duisburg – 3 April 2010; Löffingen) was a German journalist, author, professor and World War II veteran.

== Life ==
During the German invasion of the Soviet Union he was a Panzersoldat and seriously wounded on the Eastern Front. As a prisoner of war in the Soviet Union he later came into British internment. After the war he was a port and construction worker and studied architecture in Duisburg. As a journalist he was the rapporteur from Moscow and New Delhi. In 1953, he undertook a journalism apprenticeship at the Rheinische Post.

In 1955, working for Der Spiegel, Simoneit was the first German journalist to visit the People's Republic of China, at the same time becoming the magazine's travel correspondent for the entire East. During his time with Der Spiegel he also had more than 25 cover stories to his credit as well as interviews with Heinrich Nordhoff, SPD politician Georg Leber, Nikita Khrushchev, Walter Ulbricht and Henry Ford II. A highlight of his career as an author came in 1966/67 with his second book, Die neuen Bosse, which for two weeks occupied top position of the Der Spiegel best sellers' list.

From 1971 to 1974 he was chief editor of the business magazine Capital. In 1975, he became a board member and editorial director with the Motor Presse Stuttgart and founded several magazines (including ""Motor Klassik"). Between 1975 and 1982 he edited the company's leading magazine, Auto, Motor und Sport which successfully broadened its scope under his direction and had, by 1985, increased its sales to 522,045 copies. From 1978 he was a lecturer in journalism at the University of Hohenheim and in 1988 professor of the University of Hohenheim and chief editor of the Hohenheim environmental journal. He was also the founder and first director of the Georg von Holtzbrinck school for business journalists in Düsseldorf and leading member of the media academy in Stuttgart. He also was a lecturer in journalism at the University of Passau, teacher of the volunteers of the ZDF in Mainz, journalism adviser for DaimlerChrysler, Laser-Leibinger, Dekra, Vogel-Verlag and Gong-Verlag, advisory board member of Mercedes Group magazine, career advisor for the student organization AIESEC and several other positions. He also was European correspondent for the South American news magazines Progress. In 1995, he was the laudator at the World Press Photo Award.

== Publications ==
=== Books ===
- 1963: Ta Ta Tan Tan. Die Wirklichkeit Rotchinas. Econ Düsseldorf (Mitautor)
- 1966: Die neuen Bosse oder So wird man Generaldirektor. Econ Düsseldorf (Wirtschaftsbuch)
- 1980: Die Rosenthalstory. Econ Düsseldorf (Kunstbuch)
- 1985: Indiskretion Ehrensache. Ullstein München (Journalistenbuch)
- 1989: ... mehr als der Tod. Ullstein München (Kriegsroman)
- 1993: Mein Freund ist ein lackierter Kampfhund. Lübbeverlag Berg Gladbach (zur Verteidigung des Autos)
- 1995: 49 Köpfe der deutschen Wirtschaft. Schäffer & Pöschel Verlag Stuttgart (Herausgeber) (Wirtschaftsbuch)

=== Reports ===
- Das Geheimnis von Wolfsburg. Im geheimen Entwicklungszentrum von Volkswagen. (Spiegel)
- Besuch an der Pferdebrücke. In einer Kommune in Rotchina. (Spiegel)
- Denkfabrik Weissach (das Entwicklungszentrum von Porsche)
- Interview mit ehemaligem Mercedes Cargroupchef Hubbert (Playboy)
- Im Tal des Todes. Autotest in Death Valley/Kalifornien.
- Warten in Tadjemout. Leben in einer verlassenen Sahara-Oase.
- Eiskalt am Eismeer bei minus 40 Grad am Ende der Welt.
- Zwei Iltisse in der Wüste, auf Versuchsfahrt in der Sahara.
- Taxi nach Singapur. 500 km durch den Urwald von Malaysia.
- Weltmeister. Was sonst? Wie junge Männer ihre Karriere als Rennfahrer planen.

=== Publications about Simoneit ===
- Alles über Simoneit (Die Volontäre der Motor Presse über ihren Lehr-Herrn)
- Das war's (Die Schüler der Georg von Holtzbrinck- Schule über ihren Ausbilder)
- betr. Simoneit. Hausmitteilung im Spiegel über Simoneit
- Heinrich Nordhoff, K.A. Schenzinger, H. Simon und A.Zischka, Wilhelm Andermann Verlag, München

== Notable students ==
- DaimlerChrysler: Norbert Haug (Vice president Motorsport)
- Handelsblatt: Gabor Steingart (Editor in Chief since 1 June 2010)
- Stuttgarter Zeitung: Joachim Dorfs (Editor in Chief)

== Sources and further reading ==
- Obituary
