= Dirk Kurbjuweit =

German journalist and author

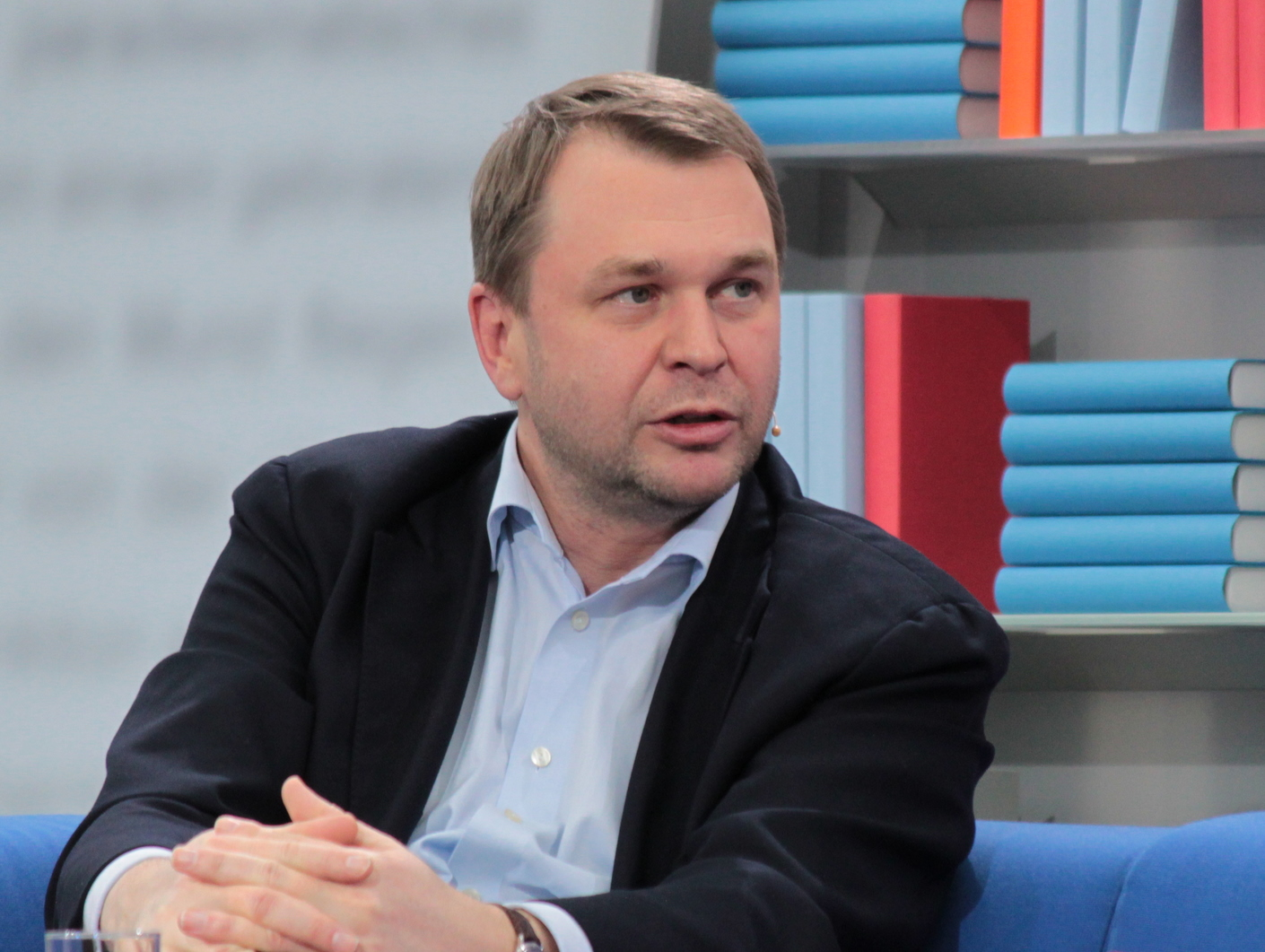
- Born: 3 November 1962 (age 64); Wiesbaden
- Writing career
- Genres: journalism novels
- Notable work: Der Spiegel
- Notable awards: Egon Erwin Kisch Prize

Dirk Kurbjuweit (born 3 November 1962 in Wiesbaden) is a German journalist and editor-in-chief of the weekly news magazine Der Spiegel, which is published in Hamburg. Furthermore, he has authored 15 novels and non-fiction books (as of 2022).

== Personal life and education ==
Kurbjuweit was born in Wiesbaden, Hesse and studied economics at the University of Cologne. At the same time he studied politics and economy at the Cologne School of Journalism. In 1988 he spent three months in Zambia through a Heinz-Kühn-Foundation scholarship.

== Career ==
He worked for the weekly paper Die Zeit from 1990 until 1999. He then joined Der Spiegel as a reporter. His later roles for the magazine included author, head of the parliamentary bureau in Berlin and deputy editor from 2015 until 2018. In May 2023 he was appointed editor-in-chief.

=== Controversies ===
==== Power Struggle in the Spiegel Editorial Leadership ====
In 2026, Kurbjuweit engaged in a power struggle with his deputy, Melanie Amann.

The conflict was triggered by Kurbjuweit’s decision, made shortly after his appointment in May 2023, to strip Amann of her editorial responsibility for political coverage and remove her from her position as head of the Berlin bureau. Later, she was also required to relinquish her role in coordinating investigative reporting.

Amann was that, that she feels slighted by Kurbjuweit. Within the leadership team, Amann was seen as an advocate for the magazine’s future in the digital realm. She pushed for greater integration and equal standing between print and digital content. In September 2025 Amann left Spiegel.

==== Starring right-wing extremist ====
Kurbjuweit faced criticism for the cover story, which portrayed right-wing AfD politician Ulrich Siegmund, known for his involvement in the "Potsdam meeting", as "Germany’s most dangerous man."

Critics, media journalists, and experts on right-wing extremism accused Der Spiegel of inadvertently providing the AfD with a massive platform and free publicity through such a provocative and sensationalist framing. Kurbjuweit rejected these accusations, arguing that the piece served to shed light on anti-constitutional or threatening tendencies within liberal democracy.

==== To conduct an unauthorized interview for the cover story ====
Due to a communication error, confidential remarks made during the authorization process for an interview with politician Elif Eralp (The Left) became visible to the editorial team at Spiegel. Dirk Kurbjuweit decided to publish these remarks, even making them the magazine’s cover story. In an editorial, he justified his decision by citing the public interest in the political capacity to act of a potential Governing Mayor.

Several media law experts considered the publication of the internal comments likely permissible, while noting that printing an unauthorized interview response would be impermissible. The German Press Council received eleven complaints regarding the Spiegel’s reporting; Eralp is considering taking legal action against the magazine. Journalist Friedrich Küpperbusch commented on what this might mean for the reporting about politicians, and that this is a "a valuable piece of advice for anyone foolish enough to grant an interview to Der Spiegel in the future."

== Awards ==
Two of his reports were awarded the Egon Erwin Kisch Prize (1998 and 2002).
