= John Seymour Chaloner =

British author and publisher

- Born: John Seymour Chaloner; 5 November 1924; Wandsworth, United Kingdom
- Died: 9 February 2007 (aged 82)
- Occupation(s): Writer, journalist

Major John Seymour Chaloner (5 November 1924 – 9 February 2007) was a British journalist, author and military officer who co-founded the German newsweekly Der Spiegel.

Chaloner has been called the "father of the freedom of press." He died in his sleep on 9 February 2007, aged 82.

== Biography ==
Chaloner came from a family of journalists. His father was editor-in-chief of a daily newspaper; his mother published the magazines Parents, Ideal Home, and Woman's Magazine. As early as 1939, Chaloner himself began working for the magazine Boy's Own Paper. During the Second World War, he enlisted in the British Army and in 1945 became a member of the Westminster Dragoons at the rank of major.

At the end of the war, Chaloner was assigned to the Public Relations and Information Services Control (PRISC), a unit that was to rebuild press, theatre, radio and cinema in Germany on behalf of the Foreign and Commonwealth Office, While supervising the press in Hanover, he joined forces with two other British officers, Czech emigrant Harry Bohrer and German Emigrant Henry Ormond to build a political weekly magazine modelled after Time magazine. The magazine was published in 1946 under the title Diese Woche (This Week) with Bohrer as acting editor-in-chief. When the Foreign Office ordered the magazine's cessation based on critical articles, Chaloner and Bohrer handed over the magazine to one of their editors and protégés, Rudolf Augstein, who re-edited it as editor and chief editor under the title Der Spiegel (The Mirror).

Chaloner then worked initially in the public relations of Field Marshal Bernard Montgomery. Back in the UK he founded his own publishing house Seymour Press (now Seymour Distribution), which mainly distributed publications from abroad.

In 1956, Chaloner published his first novel, and between 1958 and 1975 he wrote and illustrated six children's books. He bought a farm in Sussex, where he bred dairy cows and planted a vineyard. When he actually wanted to retire, he was hired as editor for various business magazines such as Director.

In 1990, Chaloner received the Federal Cross of Merit 1st Class for his services to German–British relations.
