= Tausend Zeilen Lüge =

2019 book by Juan Moreno

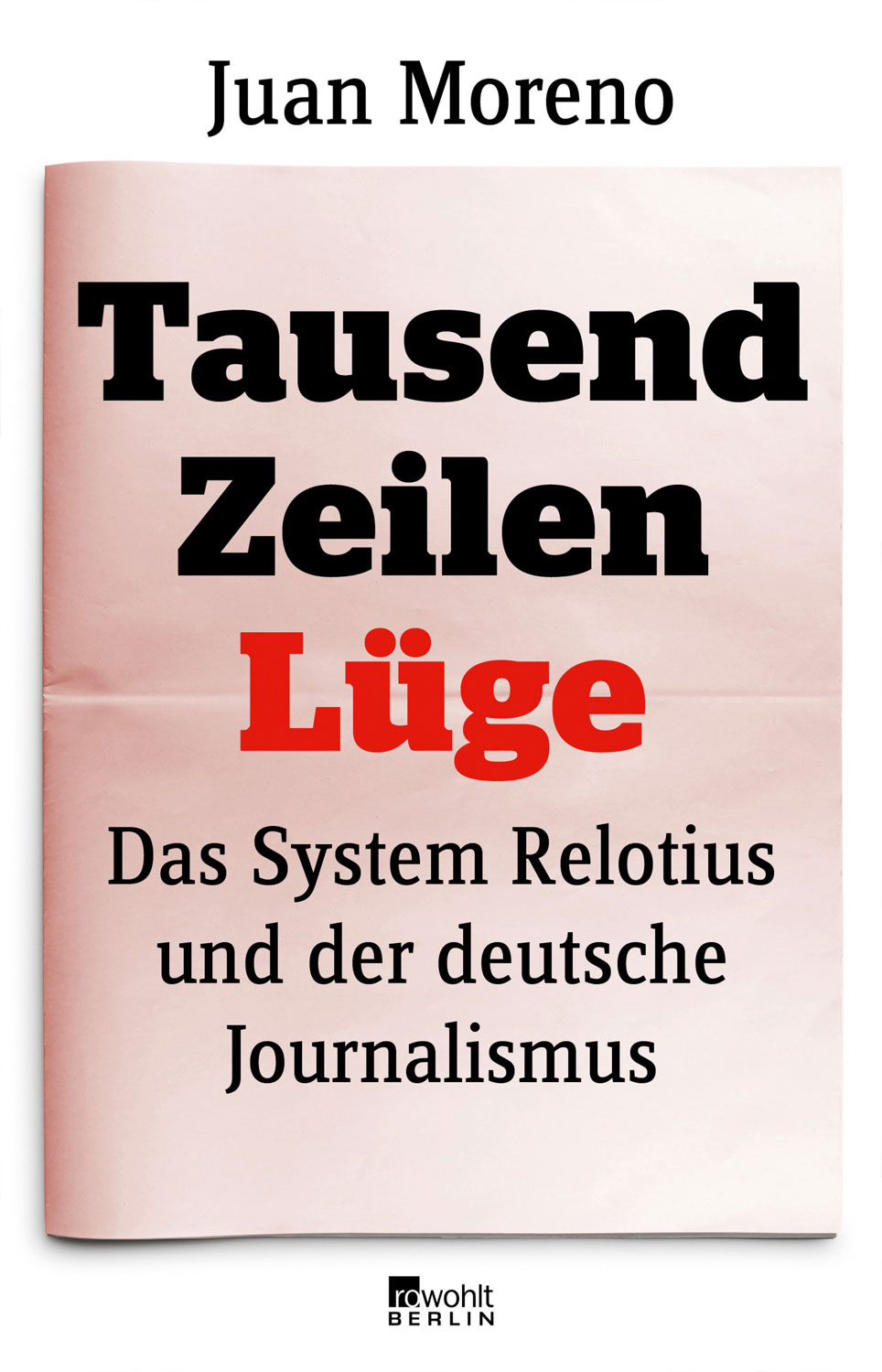
- Author: Juan Moreno
- Language: German
- Publisher: Rowohlt Verlag
- Publication date: 17 September 2019
- Publication place: German
- Pages: 288
- ISBN: 978-3-7371-0086-1

Tausend Zeilen Lüge. Das System Relotius und der deutsche Journalismus is a 2019 book by the Spanish journalist Juan Moreno. It is about the case of the Spiegel journalist Claas Relotius, who was revealed by his colleague Moreno to fabricate content for his news stories.

== Reception ==
Philip Oltermann of The Guardian called the book "a riveting read" because of the approach Moreno chose, where he, as an immigrant from Spain, portrays himself as an outsider and Relotius as a favoured "high-performance Teuton".

== Film adaptation ==
The 2022 film A Thousand Lines is loosely based on Tausend Zeilen Lüge. It was directed by Michael "Bully" Herbig and stars Jonas Nay and Elyas M'Barek. The director said it was impossible to make a fully faithful adaptation of the book, but used it as inspiration for his own interpretation of the story. In the film, the characters based on Relotius and Moreno are called Lars Bogenius and Juan Romero.
