= Steffen Klusmann =

German magazine editor (born 1966)

- Born: 15 March 1966 (age 60); Karlsruhe, West Germany
- Occupation: Journalist

Steffen Klusmann (born 15 March 1966) is a German journalist. From 2019 to 2023 he was editor-in-chief of the magazine Der Spiegel. Previously, Klusmann was deputy editor-in-chief at magazines such as Stern, Financial Times Deutschland, Capital and Business Punk.

== Life ==
Klusmann studied economics in Mainz, Glasgow and Hamburg. After his training at the Georg von Holtzbrinck School for Business Journalists in Düsseldorf, he worked for several years as an editor in the Department of Economics and Politics for the journal WirtschaftsWoche. From 1996, he reported for Manager Magazin on trends in economic policy and technology. In 1999 he moved to the editorial department of the new newspaper Financial Times Deutschland (FTD), which was first published in February 2000. He was initially responsible for background reports and comments, later becoming chief on duty. In 2003, Klusmann briefly returned to Manager Magazin, where he held the position of deputy editor-in-chief. In August 2004 he went back to the FTD, where he received the editor-in-chief position as successor to Christoph Keese. On 1 April 2009 he was also assigned the same position at Capital.

He was also spokesman for the editors-in-chief of the Gruner + Jahr business media. From November 2013 to August 2018 Steffen Klusmann was editor-in-chief of Manager Magazin.

On 22 August 2018 it was announced that Klusmann would succeed Klaus Brinkbäumer as chairman of the editorship of Der Spiegel, responsible for both the printed magazine as well as for the news portal "Spiegel Online".

Klusmann left Der Spiegel at the end of May 2023.

Since January 2024, Klusmann has been a member of the Advisory Council at the communications consultancy 365 Sherpas, where his work includes areas such as C-level positioning, business transformation, and crisis communication.

In February 2024, the Süddeutsche Zeitung (SZ) appointed Klusmann to an investigative committee tasked with looking into allegations against the newspaper’s deputy editor-in-chief, Alexandra Föderl-Schmid. Föderl-Schmid had previously been accused of incorporating uncredited text from other sources into several articles.

== Other activities ==
Klusmann is an honorary jury member at "Top 100", an award for the most innovative medium-sized companies in Germany.

== Publications ==
Klusmann is editor of several books:

- Green minds. The German pioneers of the Greentech era. FinanzBuch-Verlag, Munich 2010.
- Daughters of the German economy. FinanzBuch-Verlag, Munich 2008.
- 101 warriors of the German economy. FinanzBuch-Verlag, Munich 2006.
