= Wolf Burchard =

German-British art historian and museum curator

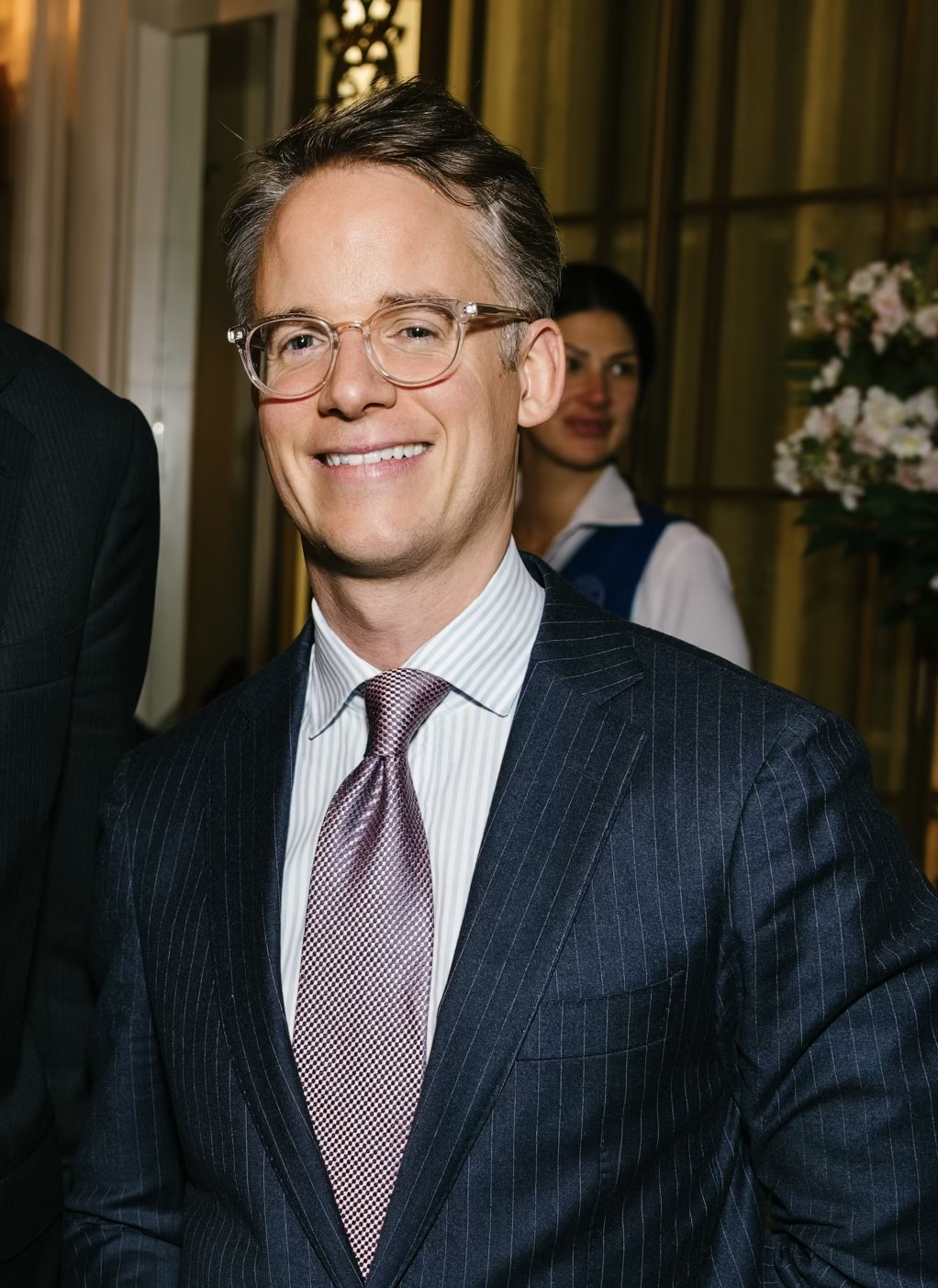
Wolf Burchard

Wolf Burchard, PhD FSA is a British-German art historian and museum curator. He is Curator in Charge of the Department of European Sculpture and Decorative Arts at the Metropolitan Museum of Art in New York City.

== Life and career ==
Burchard joined The Met's Department of European Sculpture and Decorative Arts (ESDA) in 2019, and was appointed its Curator in Charge in 2026. He held curatorial positions at the Royal Collection Trust (2009–2014) and the National Trust (2015–2018). In 2014, he co-organized the exhibition The First Georgians: Art and Monarchy, 1714–1760, shown at the then Queen's Gallery, Buckingham Palace to mark the tercentenary of the Hanoverian succession. At the National Trust, he led the digital cataloguing of the trust's collection of 55,000 pieces of furniture.

Burchard oversaw the completion of the 22-million dollar renovation of the Met's British Galleries, of which the re-opening in February 2020 launched the museum's 150th anniversary celebrations. In 2021, he curated Inspiring Walt Disney: The Animation of French Decorative Arts, the Metropolitan Museum of Art's first ever exhibit devoted to Walt Disney, which was subsequently shown at the Wallace Collection in London and the Huntington Museum in San Marino, California. The UK-based art critic Waldemar Januszczak wrote of the show: "Modern curation is usually a case of following trends, not setting them. But occasionally an exhibition turns up that is so inventive, so different, you did not see it coming. Exactly such a show is Inspiring Walt Disney at the Wallace Collection."

In February 2026, Burchard co-curated a Savonnerie carpet exhibition with the Mobilier national at the Grand Palais in Paris. Entitled Le Trésor retrouvé du Roi-Soleil, the show surprisingly attracted almost 90.000 visitors during its short, one-week run.

== Personal life ==
Wolf Burchard is the great nephew of modernist architect and Bauhaus founder Walter Gropius and the brother of film and theatre actresses Marie Burchard and Bettina Burchard.

== Publications ==
- Picture Democracy, Thornwillow Press, Newburgh 2026
- The Sovereign Artist: Charles Le Brun and the Image of Louis XIV, Paul Holberton Publishing, London 2016
- Inspiring Walt Disney: The Animation of French Decorative Arts, The Metropolitan Museum of Art and Yale University Press, New York and New Haven 2021
- "Savonnerie Reviewed: Charles Le Brun and the 'Grand tapis de pied d'ouvrage à la Turque' woven for the Grande Galerie at the Louvre", Furniture History (2012): 1-43.
- "Nation of Shopkeepers: A Very Brief History of British Decorative Arts", The New British Galleries: The Metropolitan Museum of Art Bulletin (Spring 2020): 5–29
- "Royal Remains" (What’s the point of rebuilding Germany’s palaces?), Apollo: The International Art Magazine (March 2016): 146–152
- "Game of Thrones" (Royal Thrones through the Ages), Apollo: The International Art Magazine (March 2018): 162–166
- "Don’t Pull the Rug From Under Our Feet!" (Historic Carpets in English Country Houses), Country Life (December 2018): 190–194

Burchard is a regular contributor to Apollo Magazine, The Art Newspaper and Furniture History.
