= Claas Relotius =

German former journalist who admitted to journalistic fraud (born 1985)

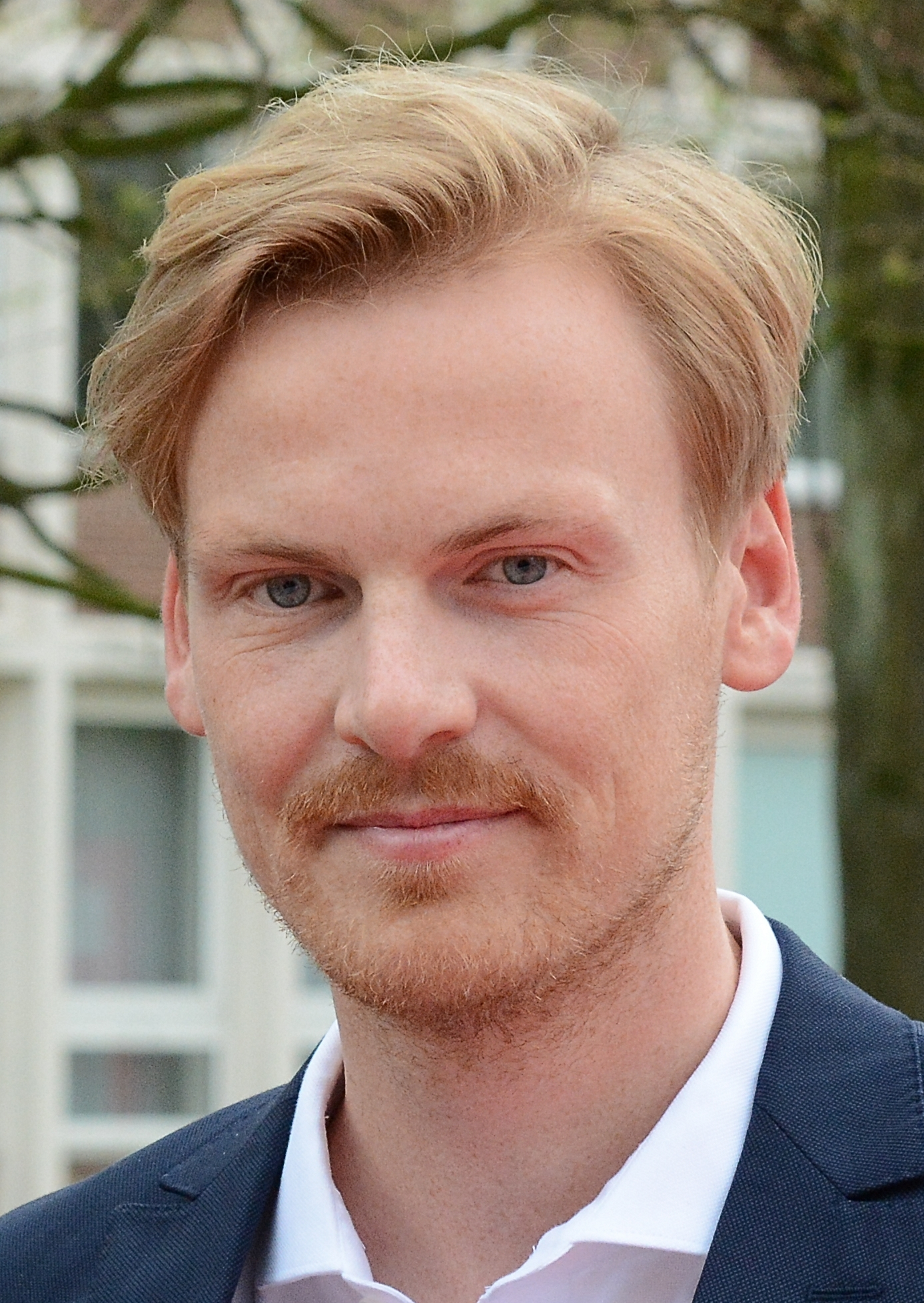
- Relotius in 2018
- Born: Claas-Hendrik Relotius; 15 November 1985 (age 41); Hamburg, West Germany
- Occupation: Journalist (former)
- Organizations: Der Spiegel
- Awards: CNN's "Journalist of the Year", 2014 (revoked); European Press Prize, 2017; Deutscher Reporterpreis, 2013, 2015, 2016 and 2018 (all returned)

Claas-Hendrik Relotius (born 15 November 1985) is a German former journalist. He resigned from Der Spiegel in 2018 after admitting to numerous instances of journalistic fraud. As a freelance reporter, he wrote for a number of German-language publications. He won several awards, including CNN's "Journalist of the Year", which was later revoked.

== Early life ==
Relotius was born in Hamburg, and grew up in Tötensen with his father, a water engineer, and his mother, a teacher. He studied political and cultural studies at the University of Bremen, graduating with a Bachelor's degree. In 2008 he was employed as an intern at Die Tageszeitung ("taz") in Hamburg, and from 2009 to 2011 completed a Master's degree at the Hamburg Media School. During 2013 he worked as a freelance journalist in Cuba, supported by a scholarship from the Heinz Kühn Foundation of the State of North Rhine-Westphalia.

== Career ==
As a freelance reporter, Relotius wrote for a number of German-language publications, including Cicero, Frankfurter Allgemeine Sonntagszeitung, Neue Zürcher Zeitung, Financial Times Deutschland, Die Tageszeitung, Die Welt, Süddeutsche Zeitung Magazin, Die Weltwoche, Die Zeit and Reportagen.

In 2017, he became a staff journalist for Der Spiegel, which had published almost 60 articles by Relotius since 2011. Relotius received several awards for his reporting, including the Deutscher Reporterpreis on four occasions, most recently in 2018. The award given by Reporterpreis to Relotius in 2018 was for "Best Reportage", delivered in Berlin in early December, for a story of "unprecedented lightness, density and relevance, which never reveals the sources on which it is based". He was the German-language CNN "Journalist of the Year" in 2014 for a story written for the Swiss magazine Reportagen and won the European Press Prize in 2017. Reporting for which he was nominated or won prizes include articles about Iraqi children kidnapped by the Islamic State, a Guantánamo Bay inmate, and Syrian orphans from Aleppo who ended up as child slaves in Turkey. In 2017, Der Spiegel sent Relotius to Fergus Falls, Minnesota, for three weeks to write an article about Donald Trump supporters "to give readers better insight into Americans". Many details in Relotius's articles, including nearly everything in the Fergus Falls story, were found to be made up. Relotius also faked interviews with the parents of NFL footballer Colin Kaepernick.

In 2023, German media reported that Relotius is working as a copywriter for a creative and advertising agency named Jung von Matt. This information was confirmed by the agency's founder Jean-Remy von Matt in an interview with Der Spiegel, who described him as a "real creative".

== Fabrication of stories ==
On 19 December 2018, Der Spiegel made public that Relotius had admitted that he had "falsified his articles on a grand scale", inventing facts, persons and quotations in at least 14 of his stories in Der Spiegel, an event occasionally being referred to as Spiegelgate. The magazine uncovered the fraud after a co-author of one of Relotius's articles about a pro-Trump vigilante group in Arizona conducting patrols along the Mexico–United States border, the Spanish-born Spiegel journalist Juan Moreno, became suspicious of the veracity of Relotius's contributions and gathered evidence against him.

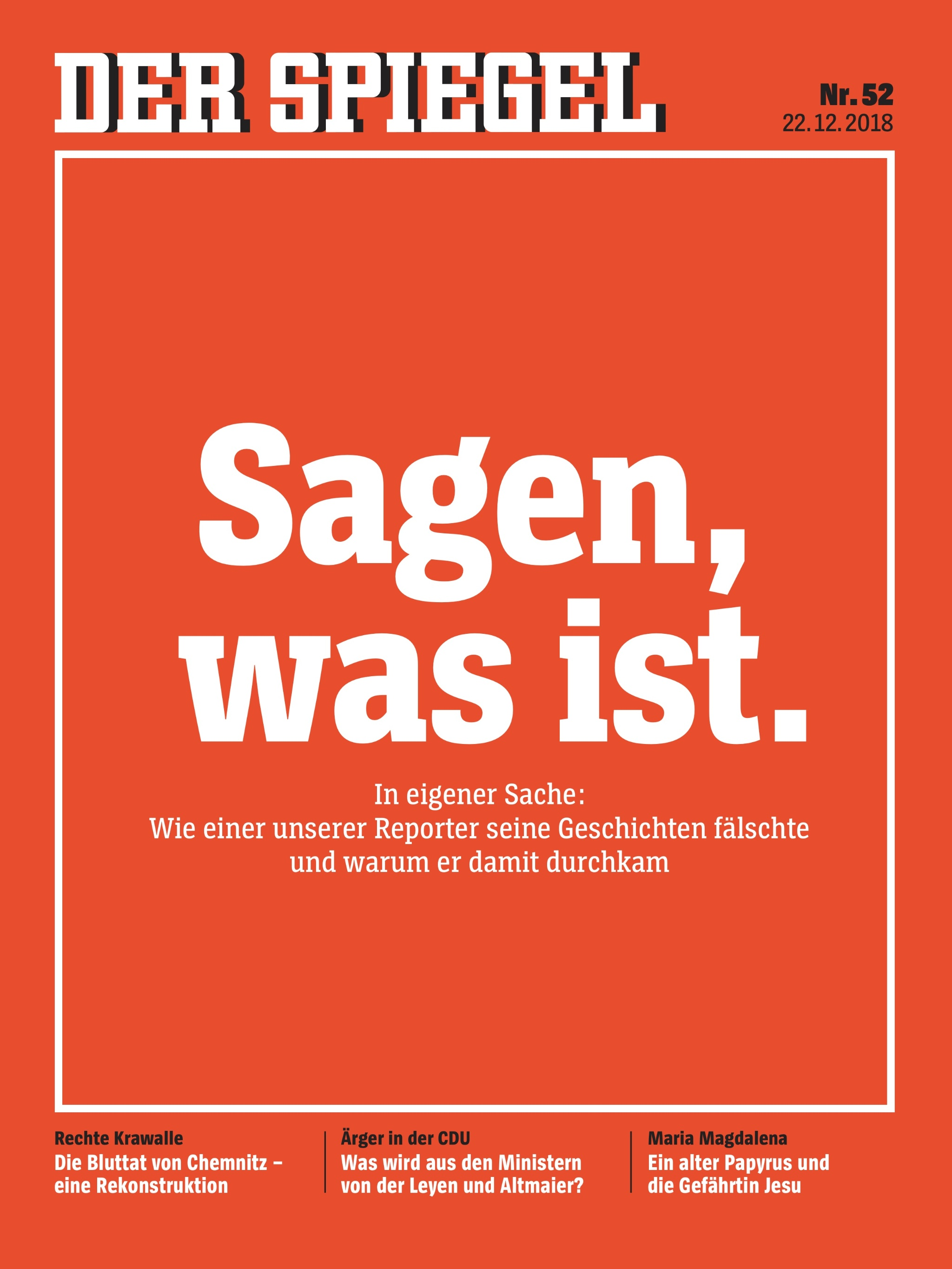
"Tell it like it is": Der Spiegel's cover story on Relotius, published on 21 December 2018

Relotius' superiors initially supported him after he said that the allegations made against him were false, and they suspected Moreno's allegations might be slanderous. However, in the face of mounting evidence of Relotius' deceit, Özlem Gezer, the deputy head of the magazine's Gesellschaft (society) section and Relotius' immediate supervisor, confronted Relotius and told him that she no longer believed him. The following day, Relotius confessed, and Der Spiegel forced his resignation, calling him "neither a reporter nor a journalist". Relotius told his former colleagues that he was sick and needed to get help. Der Spiegel left his articles accessible at the time, with a notice referring to the magazine's ongoing investigation into the fraud. In the wake of the scandal, Relotius returned four awards he received from Deutscher Reporterpreis, and CNN revoked his 2014 Journalist of the Year award. The awarded article on an Alzheimer patient in a US prison was marked by the Reportagen magazine as under investigation. The issue of Der Spiegel published on 21 December had a 23-page section on the Relotius case with a plain orange cover.

About a year earlier, two residents of Fergus Falls, Minnesota – Michele Anderson and Jake Krohn – suspected that Relotius' portrayal of their hometown was inaccurate. For example, Relotius claimed he saw a hand-painted welcome sign by the city limits that read "Mexicans Keep Out", but they knew that no such sign existed. When their efforts to contact Der Spiegel on Twitter came to nothing, they investigated the content of his story on their own. They published their findings in a blog post on Medium, detailing 11 of Relotius' most egregious falsehoods. Anderson wrote: "In 7,300 words he really only got our town's population and average annual temperature correct".

Richard Grenell, the US ambassador to Germany, wrote to the magazine, complaining about an anti-American institutional bias (Anti-Amerikanismus) and asked for an independent investigation. Grenell wrote that "These fake news stories largely focus on U.S. policies and certain segments of the American people." American journalist James Kirchick accused Der Spiegel of long peddling "crude and sensational anti-Americanism".

The scandal was seized upon by critics of the mainstream media in Western countries and was described as a moment of crisis for German journalism. Leaders of the German far-right party Alternative for Germany (AfD) wrote that it confirmed their view of the media as a "lying press" (German: Lügenpresse).

On 23 December 2018, Der Spiegel magazine announced that it was filing a criminal complaint against Relotius. He was accused of embezzling donations intended for Syrian orphans he claimed to have met in Turkey. Relotius appealed to readers for donations to help orphans, and the donations were paid into his personal bank account.

Der Spiegel published its final investigation report in May 2019, concluding that "no indications were found that anyone at DER SPIEGEL was aware of the fabrication, helped cover them up or otherwise participated in them", while stressing an urgent need for internal reform. Moreno wrote a book about the case, Tausend Zeilen Lüge (lit. 'A Thousand Lines of Lies'), which was published in 2019. The 2022 film A Thousand Lines, directed by Michael "Bully" Herbig and starring Jonas Nay and Elyas M'Barek, was inspired by Moreno's book and is a fictionalised and slightly satirical interpretation of the case; it received negative reviews.

== Awards ==
Over the course of his journalistic career, Relotius has been given a number of awards. Most of them were revoked after his fraud was discovered.

From 2012 to 2018, Relotius received a total of 19 awards in journalism, including the Austrian Magazine Prize, the Catholic Media Prize, the Peter Scholl Latour Prize and the German Reporter Prize four times (more often than anyone else) - three of them for the best report of the year.

In 2014, CNN named him Journalist of the Year. The laudatory speech said that he talked about social problems in a "poetic" way and that he succeeded in "creating images in the head of the reader that run like a movie before her eyes." It was revoked by CNN after his fraud was discovered.

In 2017, his reports about a Yemeni in the US prison at Guantanamo and about two Syrian refugee children were awarded the Reemtsma Liberty Award and the European Press Prize.

== Attempts to manipulate Wikipedia ==
No German-language Wikipedia article existed on Claas Relotius until after the allegations were made against him in December 2018. In 2019, several newly-created sock puppet accounts made a number of attempts to whitewash that article and manipulate its content in his favor.

== See also ==
- Fake news – False information presented as news
- Journalistic scandal – Publicized controversy about journalistic actions
