= Auto Motor und Sport =

German automobile magazine

Auto Motor und Sport (originally Motor und Sport)
- Categories: Automobile, motorsport
- Frequency: Biweekly
- Publisher: Verlag Motor Presse Stuttgart GmbH & Co. KG
- First issue: 1923
- Language: German
- Website: www.auto-motor-und-sport.de
- ISSN: 0005-0806

Auto Motor und Sport (stylized in all lowercase), abbreviated as AMS or AMuS, is a German automobile magazine.

It is published fortnightly by Motor Presse Netzwerk's subsidiary Motor Presse Stuttgart, a specialist magazine publisher that is 59.9% owned by the publishing house Gruner + Jahr.

== History ==
Motor und Sport was initially published in 1923 in Pößneck, Germany. It was founded by Fritz Pullig and Felicitas Von Reznicek. Pullig began his career by racing motorcycles in 1912 at the Nurburgring. Pullig was also an aviation pioneer (his first flight was at what is now Hangelarer Airport on 17 July 1909) and became a flight instructor in 1913. He served as a soldier in WWI and WWII. After the latter, Pullig became an acclaimed author, writing over 30 novels. Notable works include Lockfuhrer Lund (1940), Du bist nicht Sylvia (1939) and Der Held seiner Liebe. In the early 1950s, Pullig was a prototype test driver for Daimler Benz and Opel car prototypes in Frankfurt and tested over 345 prototype cars.

In 1963 Pullig died sitting behind the steering wheel of his car in a garage in Mainz, Germany.

Felicitas Von Reznicek co-authored to Motor und Sport magazine with Fritz Pullig. She authored many novels throughout her career. One of the novels was Hitler's Spy Princess, based on Von Reznicek's tale of how she became implicated in a conspiracy to overthrow the German government.

The magazine was renamed several times. The first edition, entitled Das Auto, appeared in time for Christmas in 1946 with a cover price of 1.50 ℛ︁ℳ︁. It was edited and in large part written by F.A.L. Martin contributed his report of automotive developments in the US. A two-page feature highlighted the virtues of the "Jeep", a word that "appeared in no dictionary but nonetheless defined the ideal vehicle for agriculture and forestry". Two pages were devoted to the future of nuclear power, incorporating four pictures of nuclear explosions, but concluding that on the grounds of cost, oil-based fuels were likely to continue to power motor vehicles in the immediate future because of the high cost of "atomic fuel" (Atombetriebsstoff).

The second edition appeared in January 1947, and was a double issue covering February 1947; this approach was enforced by paper rationing.

By 1950 an expanding circulation had enabled relocation to larger premises in Stuttgart. During the 1960s, demand for circulation increased from approximately 150,000 copies to approximately 400,000. This reflected rapid growth in West German registrations, with 4.5 million cars registered in 1960, rising to 12.5 million in 1969. Readership continued to increase. Sales peaked in 1991 at 523,387 copies.

Circulation was 406,474 copies for the 2010–2011 period, making it the ninth best-selling European automobile magazine. Its 2013 circulation was about 370,000 copies.

In 1996, a special anniversary issue featured a Berlin subscriber who had retained every copy of Auto Motor und Sport since the age of 17; just over a year after his father's car had been confiscated by a Russian officer, he had first subscribed.

The circulation of the magazine was 494,000 copies in the period 2001–2002.

Managing editors Ralph Alex and Jens Katemann took over from Bernd Ostmann in September 2012. Earlier managing editors included Ferdinand Simoneit.

Motor Presse Netzwerk issues a yearly publication called Auto Katalog, usually in August. This publication is issued in other languages as well. Yearly sales figures and an in-depth technical section are included.

International versions are published in Argentina, Brazil, Bulgaria, China, Croatia, Czech Republic, France, Hungary, Mexico, Norway, Poland, Portugal, Romania, Slovakia, Spain, Sweden, Switzerland, and Turkey.

At one point the English-only language edition was called Complete Car.
