= Alexandra Föderl-Schmid =

Austrian journalist

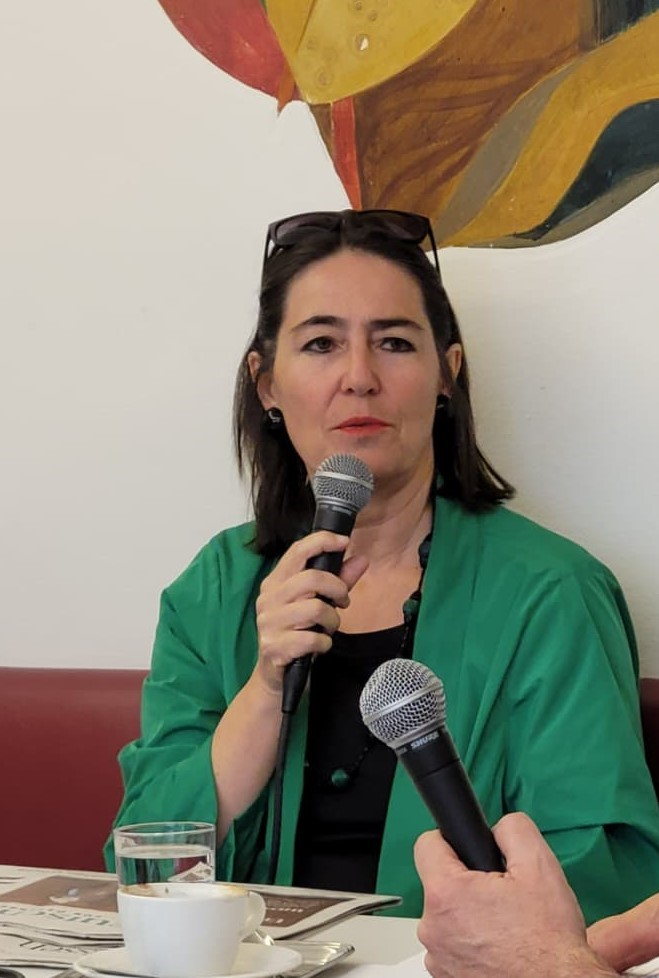
Föderl-Schmid in November 2025

Alexandra Föderl-Schmid (born 30 January 1971) is an Austrian journalist and former deputy editor-in-chief of Süddeutsche Zeitung.

== Biography ==
Born in Haslach an der Mühl, Upper Austria, Föderl-Schmid studied at the University of Salzburg, followed by a doctorate in Communications Studies, also from the University of Salzburg.

Föderl-Schmid began at Austrian newspaper Der Standard in 1990 and was the newspaper's Germany correspondent and Brussels-based European Union correspondent.

She served as editor-in-chief of Der Standard from 2007 until 2017.

Föderl-Schmid ended her work for Der Standard at the end of August 2017. From the beginning of November 2017 until the end of June 2020, she was the correspondent for the Süddeutsche Zeitung in Israel. She has been Deputy Editor-in-Chief at SZ since 15 July 2020. She temporarily withdrew from day-to-day operations on 5 February 2024 pending clarification of the plagiarism allegations against her.

The Right-wing platform Nius published incorrect accusations Föderl-Schmid had plagiated her dissertation and in her professional career she had also taken text passages from the reports of other daily newspapers in numerous named articles without indicating this. On 8 February 2024, the SZ editorial team announced that a high ranked team of former Spiegel editor-in-chief Steffen Klusmann were to investigate the allegations. Föderl-Schmid was reported missing the same day, and was found approximately 24 hours later on 9 February, suffering from hypothermia. In May 2024 the team mainly exonerated Föderl-Schmid of the allegations. In some cases the adoption of text passages from agency material were not identified as such. The team said "no violations of journalistic standards" were identified.

Her other activities include:

- Re-Imagine Europa, Member of the Advisory Board
- Reuters Institute for the Study of Journalism (RISJ), Member of the Advisory Board
- European Press Prize, Member of the panel of judges since 2014.

== Awards and honors ==
- 2005 – Austrian Press Agency Alfred Geiringer Fellowship, Reuters Institute

== See also ==
- List of solved missing person cases (2020s)
