= Egon Erwin Kisch Prize =

German literary award

The Egon Erwin Kisch Prize (German: Egon-Erwin-Kisch-Preis) was a literary prize awarded in Germany. It was named after the author and journalist Egon Erwin Kisch. The prize was started in 1977 by Henri Nannen, founder of the magazine Stern, and is intended to promote journalistic quality in the German press, especially in the print media. It was one of the most prestigious journalism awards in Germany. Starting in 2005, the prize was incorporated in the documentary category of the newly created Henri Nannen Prize.

A list of winners can be found in the German Wikipedia entry.
