= Juan Gabriel Moreno =

Colombian born architect

Juan Gabriel Moreno is a Colombian born architect. He is president and founder of Juan Gabriel Moreno Architects (JGMA), which operates from Chicago, Illinois. Moreno has worked on projects in many countries, and is known for his experimental socially-conscious designs.

== Early life and education ==
Moreno was born and grew up in Bogota, Colombia and studied architecture at California State Polytechnic University Pomona. He also lived in Florence, Italy where he studied under Superstudio founders Christiano Toraldo di Francia and Gianni Pettena.

== Career ==
Moreno founded Juan Gabriel Moreno Architects and is president of the company. Over the next 30 years, he worked on many architectural projects around the world. His projects have included both public and private designs for education, government, research, commercial, urban planning, product design and graphic design.

JGMA was presented with the 2012 AIA Chicago Design Award and was recognized by Colombian President Juan Manuel Santos as one of the “100 COLOMBIANOS” for 2013. He was a recipient of the 2013 “PIECE” Award for International Excellence which recognizes Colombians working outside of the country and making a difference in the lives of children and communities. JGMA won the 2013 Architizer International Design Award and the 2013 and 2014 Driehaus Design Excellence Award.

In 2014 JGMA was recognized by Crain's Business as one of the architecture firms “reshaping Chicago”. The company was given the 2014 Gold Medal in the Premios Arquitectura Diaspora Colombiana MMXIV.

Juan Gabriel Moreno Architects designed the UNO Soccer Academy, which won a Chicago Architecture Award in 2011. The company also designed the Instituto Health Sciences Career Academy, and The Cube at Westfield's Old Orchard Mall.

Moreno designed the Northeastern Illinois University El Centro Campus building. The design is noted for its unusual way of deflecting both traffic noise and summer heat.

In 2015 JGMA worked on several projects including a residential high-rise for the John Buck Company, a Sustainable Design Center at the Peggy Notebaert Nature Museum, and a refurbishment of the historic Lathrop Homes development. That year he was appointed by Mayor Rahm Emanuel to the Commission on Chicago Landmarks

JGMA was the recipient of the 2015 Chicago Building Congress Award for New Construction. The company was featured on television on Univision, WTTW Chicago’s My Chicago program, and on ABC‘s ñ Beat show. JGMA was one of the eight architecture firms representing Chicago in the inaugural Architecture Biennial. Architect magazine selected JGMA as one of the “Top 50 Design Firms” in the U.S. in 2015 and it was selected by Modern Luxury Interiors magazine as the best architecture firm in their annual Best of Design Issue.

In 2015 Moreno was presented with three building design awards from the Chicago AIA. One of the awards, for the El Centro building, raised controversy after it was discovered that it was given based on photographs that were digitally manipulated to remove large rooftop mechanical units from view. Also in 2015, JGMA entered a contest to design the planned Obama Presidential Center.

In 2017 Moreno joined the board of directors of the Loyola University Health System.
