= Capital (German magazine) =

German business magazine

- Editor-in-chief: Horst von Buttlar
- Categories: Business magazine
- Frequency: Monthly
- Circulation: 139,342 (4th quarter of 2014)
- Publisher: Gruner + Jahr
- Founded: 1956; 70 years ago
- Company: Gruner + Jahr
- Country: Germany
- Based in: Hamburg
- Language: German
- Website: Capital
- ISSN: 1439-9717
- OCLC: 803989959

Capital is a German-language monthly business magazine published by Gruner + Jahr in Hamburg, Germany.

== History and profile ==
Capital was established in 1956. The magazine is published monthly by Gruner + Jahr. It appears on the first Thursday of each month. However, at the beginning of the 2000s it was published on a biweekly basis. Horst von Buttlar is the editor-in-chief of the magazine which has its headquarters in Berlin.

Since 1970 the magazine has published annually the Kunstkompass (Art Compass), a hierarchy of mainstream artists and their ranking within the art market and mainstream art world. Art Compass has been an accurate indicator of art market and mainstream gallery success over that period, despite the open but imprecise and contingent factors that are used to create the mathematics within the league-table.

== Circulation ==
In 2001 Capital had a circulation of 228,000 copies. In 2010 the circulation of the magazine was down to 175,240 copies. During the fourth quarter of 2014 it was down to 139,342 copies.

== Editor-in-chiefs ==
- 1962–1971: Adolf Theobald
- 1971–1974: Ferdinand Simoneit
- 1974–1980: Johannes Gross
- 1980–1986: Ludolf Herrmann
- 1987–1988: Dieter Piel
- 1988–1991: Rolf Prudent
- 1991–2001: Ralf-Dieter Brunowsky
- 2002–2006: Kai Stepp
- 2006–2009: Klaus Schweinsberg
- 2009–2013: Steffen Klusmann
- since 2013: Horst von Buttlar

== See also ==
- List of magazines in Germany
