= Harry Bohrer =

Harry Boher
- Born: Hanus Bohrer; 5 November 1916; Prague, Bohemia
- Died: 2 October 1985 (aged 69)
- Occupation(s): Writer, journalist

Harry Bohrer (1916 – 2 October 1985) was a Czech-British journalist. Bohrer is one of the founders of the news magazine Der Spiegel.

== Bibliography ==
- Betr.: Harry Bohrer. In: Der Spiegel. 41 /1985, 7. October 1985.
- Leo Brawand: Die Spiegel-Story. Wie alles anfing. Econ, Düsseldorf 1987, ISBN 3-430-11555-8.
- Leo Brawand: Der Spiegel – ein Besatzungskind. Wie die Pressefreiheit nach Deutschland kam. Europäische Verlagsanstalt, Hamburg 2007, ISBN 978-3-434-50604-1.
- Peter Merseburger: Rudolf Augstein. Biografie. Deutsche Verlags-Anstalt, Munich 2007, ISBN 978-3-421-05852-2.
