= Juan Carlos Moreno Poggio =

Uruguayan politician (1982–2025)

Juan Carlos Moreno Poggio (12 May 1982 – 23 October 2025) was a Uruguayan agricultural technician and politician. He was elected to the Chamber of Representatives of Uruguay representing Paysandú from 2020 to 2025.

== Life and career ==
Moreno Poggio was born on 12 May 1982 in Paysandú, he studied between 1999 and 2001 at the Faculty of Agrarian Sciences of the Universidad de la Empresa (UDE). He worked as a small rural producer, both in a 36-hectare field with his family as an advisor to other farm owners, and also as an Inspector of Plaza Rural, a consortium that sells cattle.

A Colorado militant since his youth, he attended a National Convention of the Colorado Party in the period 2012–2017 when he was elected to the youth section of the Colorado Party. Later, Moreno joined the Ciudadanos sector, at the invitation of economist Ernesto Talvi, to carry out the sector when it was being formed. He was a candidate for member for Paysandú for list 600 in the 2019 general elections. He was the most voted Colorado candidate in the department and elected as a member for Paysandú, ahead of Colorado member Walter Verri for two consecutive terms. In February 2025 he left the Colorado Party to support the candidacy of Blanco Jorge Washington Larrañaga Vidal to the Intendancy of Paysandú.

Moreno Poggio had cancer and died 23 October 2025, at the age of 43.
