= Juan Carlos Moreno (baseball) =

Cuban baseball player

Medal record

Men's baseball

Representing Cuba

World Baseball Classic
| Silver medal – second place | 2006 San Diego | Team |

Baseball World Cup
| Gold medal – first place | 1998 Rome | Team |
| Gold medal – first place | 2005 Rotterdam | Team |

Intercontinental Cup
| Silver medal – second place | 1999 Sydney | Team |

Central American and Caribbean Games
| Gold medal – first place | 1998 Maracaibo | Team |

Juan Carlos Moreno Pérez (born September 28, 1975 in Nueva Gerona) is a shortstop with Isla de la Juventud and the Cuba national baseball team.

== Career ==
Moreno is a mainstay on the national team, and made his international debut at the 1998 World Championships. Moreno played for the Cuban national team in the 1999 Baltimore Orioles–Cuba national baseball team exhibition series. He was also on the roster for the 2006 World Baseball Classic
