= Juan Carlos Moreno (Argentine footballer) =

Argentine footballer

Personal information
- Full name: Juan Carlos Moreno
- Place of birth: Mendoza, Argentina
- Place of death: Mendoza, Argentina
- Position: Goalkeeper

Senior career*
Years	Team	Apps	(Gls)
1954–1957	Andes Talleres		
1958	Atlético Palmira		
1960	Argentinos Juniors		
1963–1964	Coquimbo Unido	63	(0)
1965–1969	Palestino	147	(0)
1966	→ Colo-Colo (loan)	–	(–)

International career
- Argentina
- * Club domestic league appearances and goals

Juan Carlos Moreno was an Argentine footballer who played as a goalkeeper for clubs in his homeland and Chile.

== Career ==
Born in Mendoza, Argentina, Moreno played for Andes Talleres, winning the Liga Mendocina de Fútbol in 1956, Atlético Palmira and Argentinos Juniors in his homeland. He stood out with Argentinos Juniors at the beginning of the 1960's.

In 1963, Moreno moved to Chile looking for a better environment for his sick daughter and joined Coquimbo Unido in the Chilean Primera División. In 1965, he switched to Palestino and spent five seasons with them until 1969. He also played for Colo-Colo in a 2–2 draw against the Brazilian giant Santos on 17 February 1966.

At international level, Moreno represented the Argentina national team alongside Amadeo Carrizo and was a substitute in a friendly against Uruguay.

== Personal life ==
His son, Luis, is a football coach.
