= Financial Times Deutschland =

German financial newspaper

- Logo of the Financial Times Deutschland
- Owner: Gruner + Jahr
- Editor: Steffen Klusmann
- Founded: 21 February 2000
- Ceased publication: 7 December 2012
- Political alignment: Keynesianism
- Language: German
- Headquarters: Hamburg, Germany
- Circulation: 103,000
- ISSN: 1615-4118

The Financial Times Deutschland was a German-language financial newspaper based in Hamburg, Germany, published by Bertelsmann's Gruner + Jahr newspaper and magazine division. The daily contained four sections: Business, Politics & Economy, Finance, and Agenda (Comment, Analysis, Sport, Culture). It ceased publication on 7 December 2012.

== History and profile ==
Financial Times Deutschland was founded at the height of the dot-com bubble on 21 February 2000 as a joint venture between UK Financial Times publisher Pearson and Gruner + Jahr. The paper's original editor was Andrew Gowers. Circulation grew to 103,000 readers by the third quarter of 2007, however the paper never turned a profit. At the beginning of 2008 Pearson sold their stake to Gruner + Jahr for €10m and an agreement to receive annual licence fees of €500,000. Following the sale to Gruner + Jahr, the FT Deutschland became no longer subject to any editorial control from the Financial Times.

The circulations of the daily in 2008, in 2009 and in 2010 were 112,238 copies, 103,276 copies and 103,609 copies, respectively.

== Closure ==
In November 2012, Gruner + Jahr announced the closure of Financial Times Deutschland as part of a restructuring of their economics publishing division, having failed to find a buyer for the title. G + J estimate that the FTD made a cumulative loss of €250m over its 12-year life. The last print edition was published on 7 December 2012 displaying an all black front cover featuring the words "Endlich schwarz" ("At last, black" alluding to never having booked a profit since inception). The final issue was named Final Time Deutschland. The paper's internet presence was also closed.

The final editor was Steffen Klusmann, who had taken the role on 1 August 2004 following the defection of Christoph Keese to rival Welt am Sonntag.

Following the closure, memorabilia from the newspaper was auctioned off, with the proceeds being donated to press freedom advocates Reporters Without Borders.
