= Juan Moreno (journalist) =

Spanish former journalist

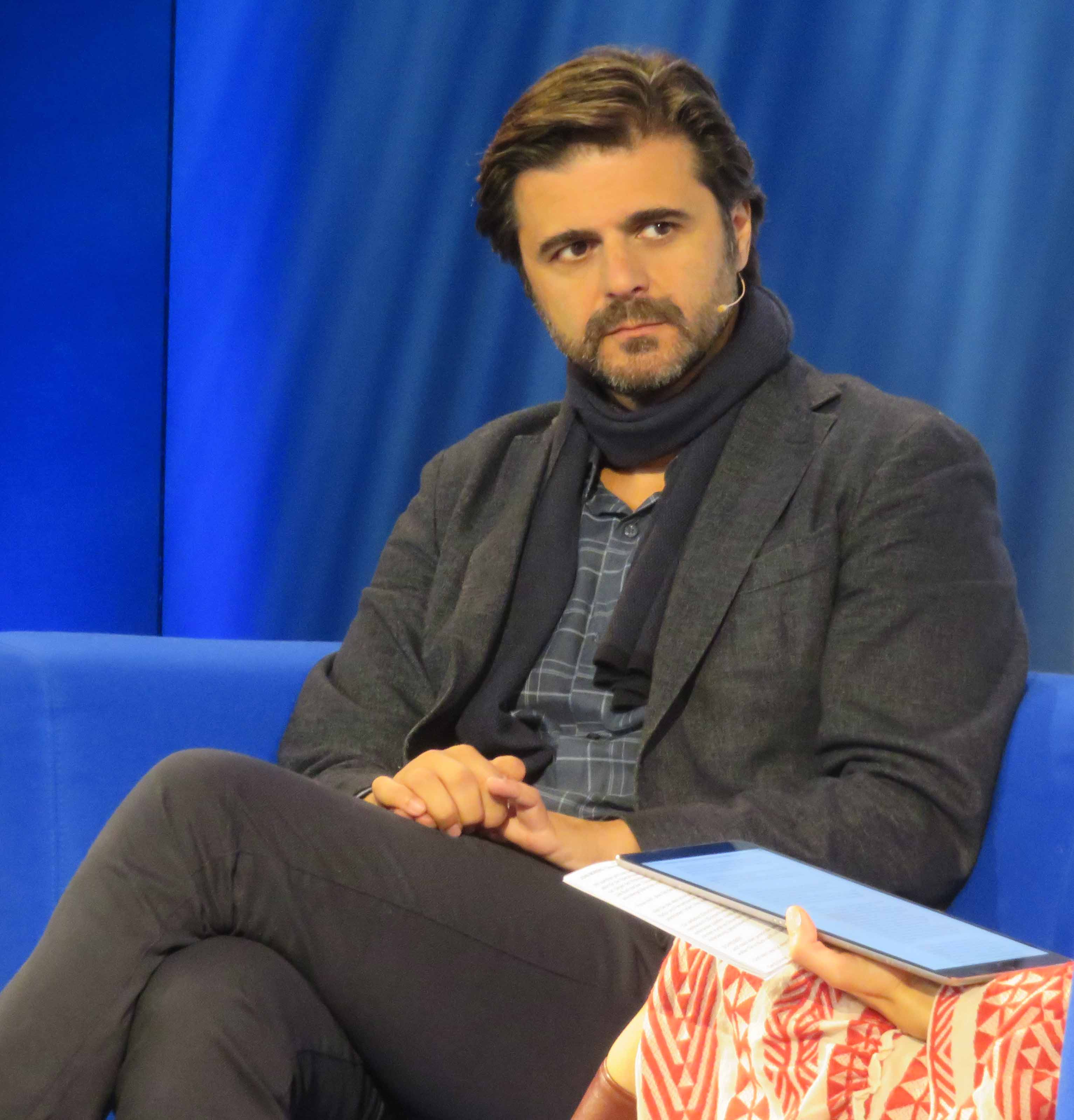
- Moreno in 2019
- Born: Juan Moreno; 6 October 1972 (age 54); Huércal-Overa, Spain
- Occupation: Journalist
- Organizations: Der Spiegel

Juan Moreno is a Spanish journalist based in Germany who works for the newspaper Der Spiegel. He is best known internationally for exposing the German journalist Claas Relotius for Journalist fraud.
