= The Attacks of 26/11 =

2013 Indian Hindi-language action thriller film

- Theatrical release poster
- Directed by: Ram Gopal Varma
- Written by: Ram Gopal Varma; Rommel Rodrigues
- Based on: Kasab: The Face of 26/11 by Rommel Rodrigues; 2008 Mumbai Attacks
- Produced by: Parag Sanghvi
- Starring: Nana Patekar; Sanjeev Jaiswal; Atul Kulkarni
- Cinematography: Harshraj Shroff; M. Ravichandran Thevar
- Edited by: Sunil Wadhwani; Ajit Nair
- Music by: Amar Mohile
- Production company: Alumbra Entertainment
- Distributed by: Eros International
- Release dates: February 2013 (Berlin); 1 March 2013
- Running time: 116 minutes
- Country: India
- Language: Hindi
- Budget: ₹22 crore (US$2.3 million)
- Box office: ₹30.9 crore (US$3.2 million) (7.9 cr India; 23 cr worldwide)

The Attacks of 26/11 is a 2013 Indian Hindi-language action thriller film directed by Ram Gopal Varma, based on the book Kasab: The Face of 26/11 by Rommel Rodrigues about Ajmal Kasab, then sole surviving perpetrator of the 2008 Mumbai attacks. The film stars Nana Patekar as Rakesh Maria, then Joint Commissioner of Police and Sanjeev Jaiswal in his film debut, playing the role of terrorist Ajmal Kasab. Ajmal Kasab was sentenced to death in May 6th, 2010.

== Plot ==
Before a committee investigating the 2008 Mumbai Attacks, Rakesh Maria, the Joint Commissioner of Police, recounts the execution of the attacks, the police response, and the interrogation of the sole surviving perpetrator, Ajmal Kasab.

On 22 November 2008, ten young Lashkar-e-Taiba militants, including Kasab, hijack an Indian fishing vessel, MV Kuber, in international waters. After killing the crew, they reach the coast of Mumbai via inflatable speedboats on the evening of 26 November. Dividing into pairs, they disperse to target high-profile locations across South Mumbai, including the CSMT, Leopold Cafe, the Taj Mahal Palace Hotel, the Oberoi Trident Hotel, Nariman House, and Cama Hospital.

At CSMT, Kasab and his accomplice, Ismail Khan, open fire indiscriminately on commuters, killing dozens. Mumbai Police personnel respond to the attack, but are constrained by inferior weaponry. Moving towards Cama Hospital, Kasab and Ismail ambush a police vehicle, killing Anti-Terrorism Squad chief Hemant Karkare, Additional Commissioner Ashok Kamte, and Inspector Vijay Salaskar. The duo hijacks the vehicle, but is intercepted at a police roadblock near Girgaum Chowpatty. Assistant sub-inspector of police Tukaram Omble grapples with Kasab, sustaining fatal gunshot wounds while enabling his colleagues to capture Kasab alive. Ismail is killed in the scuffle.

Concurrently, the remaining militants hold hostages and engage in prolonged firefights inside the Taj Mahal Palace Hotel and Nariman House. Local police and hotel staff attempt to contain the situation until NSG commandos arrive to clear the locations and neutralize the attackers.

Following Kasab's capture, Maria leads his interrogation. Kasab initially demonstrates intense radicalization, expressing a belief that his actions of killing infidels guaranteed him entry to Jannah. Outraged after hearing this, and after Kasab requests Maria to keep him with his fellow terrorists, Maria takes him to a mortuary to view the corpses of his deceased accomplices. Maria delivers an extended monologue dismantling the ideological justifications provided by Kasab's handlers, highlighting how they manipulate impoverished and uneducated youths into committing these atrocities while remaining safe. Broken and confronted with the reality of the destruction, Kasab breaks down and expresses remorse.

The film concludes as Kasab is tried, convicted, and executed by hanging at Yerwada Central Jail in Pune on 21 November 2012, followed by a solemn tribute to the victims and the fallen first responders.

== Cast ==
- Nana Patekar as JCP Rakesh Maria IPS, the main protagonist
- Sanjeev Jaiswal as Ajmal Kasab, the main antagonist
- Atul Kulkarni as Inspector Shashank Shinde
- Saad Orhan as Abu Ismail Khan
- Ashish Bhatt as Shoaib
- Atul Gavandi as Abu Umer
- Ravinder Barara as Hafiz Arshad (Abdul Rehman Bada alias Hayaji)
- Satwinder singh as Abu Ali (Javed)
- Vishal Khosla as Abdul Rehman
- Sukesh Mishra as Fahadullah
- Moni Rai as Nasir (Ubed)
- Mukesh Tripathi as Babar Imran
- Shahab Khan as Inspector at Cama Hospital
- Jitendra Joshi as Constable Nalawade
- Ravi Kale as Constable Jadhav
- Ganesh Yadav as Amar Singh Solanki, captain of the fishing trawler MV Kuber
- Farzad Jehani as himself, owner of Leopold Cafe
- Jasbir Thandi as Joint Commissioner of Police Hemant Karkare IPS
- Sunil Jadhav as Tukaram Omble IPS
- Anirudh Harip as Duty Doctor at Cama and Albless Hospital
- Asif Basra as the Taxi Driver, who brought Kasab and Ismail To CST
- Urvashi Sharma as the Receptionist of Taj Hotel
- Shiv Prasad Sharma as the Hangman at Yerwada Central Jail

== Production ==
On 30 December 2008, the director, Ram Gopal Varma, toured the Taj Mahal Palace Hotel just days after the attacks, drawing widespread condemnation. At the time, Varma called his visit a 'coincidence' and said he had no plans of making a film based on the attacks, but later apologised for his visit prior to the release of the film.

Varma stated that they used sources to research the attacks, including eyewitnesses, police statements, charge sheets and the author of the book, Rommel Rodrigues, whom he described as "a walking encyclopaedia".

Under the art direction of Uday Singh, a replica of the Taj Mahal Palace Hotel was built with a cost of ₹ 40 million. Varma auditioned 500 applicants and selected Sanjeev Jaiswal to play Ajmal Kasab. The film used real locations and covers the night of 26 November 2008, focusing primarily between 9 PM and 1 AM, when Kasab was caught. The shooting of the film was finished by 11 December 2012 at Chhatrapati Shivaji Terminus.

== Soundtrack ==
"Maula Maula" was debuted by Sukhwinder Singh at the Leopold Cafe at 9:30 AM some time before 12 February 2013, the hour when the attacks began. At the event, scenes from the film were shown, Patekar spoke of his experience while shooting the film and two victims of the attack on the cafe were later invited on stage to speak of their experiences.

There are five songs on the soundtrack, of which "Nethutti Ruchi Mariginda" was sung by Varma in the Telugu version of the film.

No.	Title	Lyrics	Singer(s)	Length
1.	"Maula Maula"	Irshad Kamil	Sukhwinder Singh, Rooshin Dalal	5:05
2.	"Aatanki Aaye"	Jaspreet Jasz	Shreya Ghoshal, Shabab Sabri, Aman Trikha	2:45
3.	"Khoon Kharaba Tabaahi"	Rashid Iqbal	Chaitra Ambadipudi	5:54
4.	"Raghupati Raghav"	Irshad Kamil	Chorus	5:45
5.	"Nazam track 26/11"	Liaqat Jafri	Chorus	3:15

=== Soundtrack reception ===
Joginder Tuteja of Bollywood Hungama gave it a 2 out of 5 stars, stating that, aside from "Maula Maula", the rest of the songs are "average to hear and may just enhance the film's narrative to some extent".

=== Marketing ===
The first seven minutes of the film were released on the YouTube channel of Eros International on 23 November 2012. A special screening of the film was arranged by the director for Karan Johar and Rakesh Maria. The first trailer of Satya 2 was attached with the film.

== Release ==
The first look of the film was revealed on 17 January 2013. The Central Board of Film Certification (CBFC) passed the film, uncut, with an 'Adults Only' certificate. The film premiered at the Berlin International Film Festival in both the Panorama and Competition sections. It had its theatrical release on 1 March 2013 to mixed reviews from critics, receiving positive reviews when it was shown at the Films Division Auditorium in Delhi, where several politicians were present.

== Reception ==
Firstpost commended Patekar in his role in their review, saying "Nana holds the film together. He feels every line that he utters. His heart bleeds for each one of the 166 people who died on that night. When he tells Kasab in a choked voice, 'I have a son of your age', Nana isn't faking it. His performance goes way beyond acting."

Subhash K. Jha of the Deccan Herald gave the film 4 out of 5 stars, calling the movie "a work of riveting resonance" and "one of the best films in recent times on the wages of terrorism". Resham Sengar of Zee News called the film "a moving sketch of the dreadful terror attack", and gave the film 4 stars out of 5. Taran Adarsh of Bollywood Hungama gave it 3.5 out of 5 and said that the film was "A powerful retelling of a regrettable event in history".

Vaihayasi Pande Daniel of Rediff.com gave it two and half stars, saying "I have a headache. My ears are still ringing. The nausea is just about abating." Madhureeta Mukherjee of The Times of India said "While the thought is poignant, the horror isn't palpable throughout and the execution doesn't cut as deep as the actual tragedy" and gave it two and half stars.

Saibal Chatterjee of NDTV gave 2.5 stars, calling the movie "watchable" and saying "Ram Gopal Varma is still not back to his best and The Attacks of 26/11 isn't an unqualified triumph." In Anupama Chopra's review for the Hindustan Times, the film also received 2.5 stars, remarking that the movie's "powerful subject [is] watered down by ineffective story-telling".

In his review for News18, Rajeev Masand gave the film 1.5 stars, writing that the film "often resembles a tacky B-movie" and was a "tragedy exploited".

== See also ==
- Hotel Mumbai
