= Rakesh Maria =

Former Indian police officer

38th Police Commissioner of Mumbai
- In office 15 February 2014 – 8 September 2015
- Preceded by: Satyapal Singh
- Succeeded by: Ahmed Javed

Personal details
- Born: 19 January 1957 (age 69) Bombay, Bombay State, India
- Spouse: Preeti Maria
- Children: 2
- Education: St. Andrew's High School, Mumbai; St. Xavier's College, Mumbai
- Occupation: Law Enforcement
- Awards: President's Police Medal for Distinguished Service. Police Medal for Meritorious Service. 50th Anniversary Independence Medal.

Military service
- Years of service: Maharashtra Police (1981-1993); Mumbai Police (1993-2017)
- Rank: Director general of police

Rakesh Maria (born 19 January 1957) is a former Indian Police Officer. He last served as the Director General of Home Guard. Before that he served as the Police Commissioner of Mumbai.

== Early life and education ==
Maria was born in Punjabi family to Vijay Madia (the surname got distorted to Maria) who resided in Bandra, Mumbai. His father a well-known name in film circles was the founder of Kala Niketan, a banner under which he made films such as Kaajal, Preetam, Neel Kamal, among others as a top Bollywood financier and producer. Maria had also represented his state Maharashtra in Karate at the National Games in 1979.

Maria graduated from St. Xavier’s College in Mumbai. He passed the Union Public Service Commission (UPSC) exams to join the Indian Police Service (IPS) cadre.

== Career ==
Maria belongs to the 1981 batch of the Indian Police Service. His first posting was as an assistant superintendent of police in Akola and then in Buldhana districts of Maharashtra.

Maria was transferred to Mumbai in 1986 and became the Deputy Commissioner Police (Traffic) in 1993. He was appointed the Commissioner of Mumbai Police on 15 February 2014. In 2015, he was promoted as the Director General of Home Guards.

Maria retired on 31 January 2017, after 36 years of service.

=== Anti-terror work ===
As the Deputy Commissioner Police (Traffic) in 1993, he solved the Bombay serial blasts case, and later moved to DCP (Crime) and then Joint Commissioner of Police (Crime) of the Mumbai Police.

Maria solved the 2003 Gateway of India and Zaveri Bazaar twin blasts case, arresting six people, including a couple for planting the explosive devices inside taxis. The investigation was successful. The accused, Ashrat Ansari, Haneef Sayyed and his wife Fahmeeda were convicted and sentenced to death in August 2009 by a special POTA court in Mumbai. Later, the death sentence was upheld by Bombay High Court in February 2012.

=== 26/11 Mumbai attacks investigation ===
Maria was given the responsibility of investigating the 26/11 Mumbai attacks of 2008. He interrogated Ajmal Kasab, the only terrorist captured alive, and successfully investigated the case. Kasab was executed by hanging in 2012. In his 2020 memoir Let Me Say It Now, elaborating on the Hindu Terror conspiracy, Maria wrote,

If all had gone well, he [Ajmal Kasab, the only one of the ten terrorists to be caught alive] would have been dead with a red string tied around his wrist like a Hindu. We would have found an identity card on this person with fictitious name Samir Dinesh Choudhari, student of Arunoday Degree and P.G College.

He claimed that it ruined the plans of Pakistan of proclaiming the Mumbai Terror Attack as a Hindu conspiracy.

== Controversies ==
=== Ashok Kamte's death ===
Vinita Kamte, the wife of slain IPS officer Ashok Kamte who was killed by terrorists during the 26/11 Mumbai terror attacks, lashed out at Maria due to his appointment as Mumbai Police Commissioner. She had earlier alleged discrepancies in crucial call records of wireless conversations between the police control room and Ashok Kamte's van on the day of his death. Earlier in 2009 she had questioned Maria's claims that he did not direct Ashok Kamte to the Cama Hospital where he died. Rakesh Maria had been in charge of the police control room at the time of the carnage in November 2008.

Maria felt defenseless against such an emotional issue. The Government of Maharashtra was initially reluctant to defend Maria, an officer with a formidable reputation, not wanting to hurt the sentiments of a martyr’s wife. He just said that the facts would absolve him. "You don't defend him, and you don't let him defend himself!" commented a Mumbai Crime Branch senior. Thrice he appeared before and had replied to all these allegations in detail before the Pradhan Committee. He was confident of his facts and told that Vinita Kamte had been selective in quoting.

Mumbai Police Officers later told that Kamte most possibly expressed her emotional outbursts and anger by writing the book. She might have got solace by attacking Maria, but it had also damaged the police force. The highly sensitive Police Control Room logbook came in public purview, just because of an RTI. The Ram Pradhan Committee was too critical on the role of the then Commissioner of Police Hasan Gafoor and said that he had flouted the Standard Operating Practice by saddling Joint Commissioner Rakesh Maria with the charge of the Police control room.

=== Moral Policing ===
On 6 August 2015, Malwani police in Mumbai, raided hotels and guest houses near Aksa Beach and Madh Island and detained about 40 couples. Despite most of them being consenting couples in private rooms, they were charged under Section 110 (Indecent behaviour in public) of the Bombay Police Act and fined ₹1,200 (US$12). Only three cases were filed under Prevention of Immoral Traffic Act. Following protests, criticism and pressure, Maria ordered a thorough inquiry into the raids. Following an investigation, Maria passed an order to all police officers not to use the Section 110 of the Bombay Police Act, 1951 which is an offense of Public Indecency to harass citizens and moral police them.

== Personal life ==
Maria is married to Preeti and the couple have two sons, Kunal and Krish.

== Publications ==
- Maria, Rakesh (2020). Let me say it now. Chennai: Amazon Westland. ISBN 9789389152067. OCLC 1156076794.

== In popular culture ==
- In the film Black Friday, actor Kay Kay Menon played the role of Maria. In the film's timeline (after 1993 Bomb Blasts), Rakesh Maria was the Deputy Commissioner of Police, and in charge of the investigation.
- The character Ajay Lal in Suketu Mehta's nonfiction work Maximum City is based on Maria.
- Nana Patekar played the role of Maria in Ram Gopal Varma film The Attacks of 26/11. In this film, Maria was portrayed as a Senior officer during 2008 Mumbai attacks.
- In the movie, A Wednesday!, directed by Neeraj Pandey. Anupam Kher's character was inspired by Maria.
- In the Netflix series "Scoop", the character Ramesh Mallik is based on Maria.
- In the Netflix Series "The Indrani Mukerjea Story: Buried Truth", Maria appears as a part of news documentaries.

In January 2024, popular director Rohit Shetty announced to make a biopic movie based on Maria from 1985 to 2008 showcasing his policing highlights.

Police appointments
Preceded by Satya Pal Singh	Police Commissioner of Mumbai; 2014 - 2015	Succeeded by Ahmed Javed
