= Ashok Kamte =

Indian police officer

Additional Commissioner of Police Ashok Kamte AC IPS
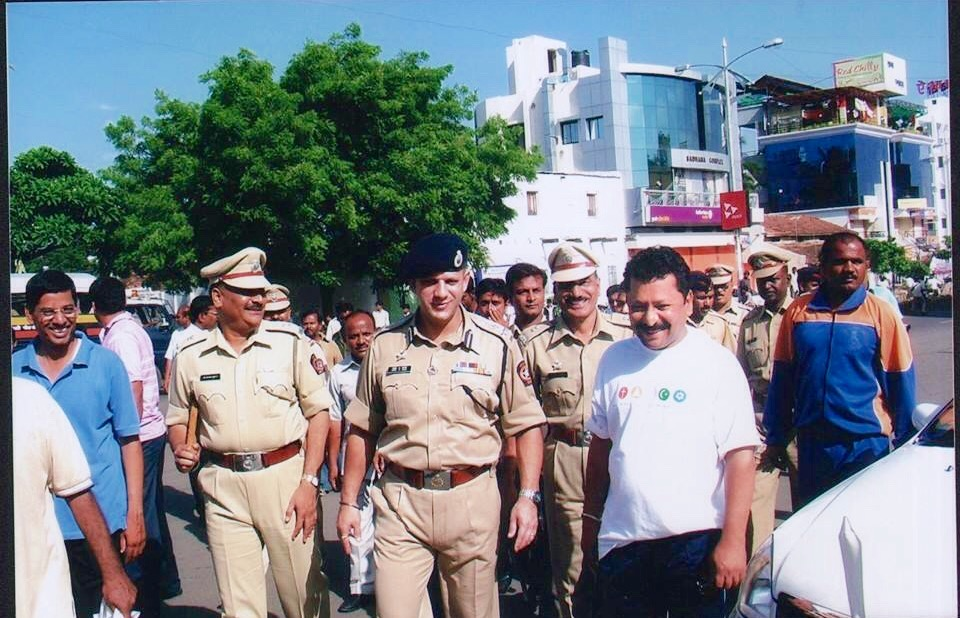
- Shri Ashok Kamte with Dr. Prabhakar Budhavant and Qayyum Inamdar in an event organized by Solapur District Chemist and Druggist Association
- Born: 23 February 1965; India
- Died: 26 November 2008 (aged 43); Mumbai, Maharashtra, India
- Other name: Ashok Kampte
- Police career
- Department: Indian Police Service officer
- Service years: 1989–2008
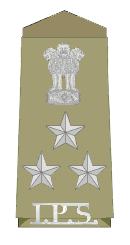
- Rank: Additional Commissioner of Police
- Awards: Ashoka Chakra

Ashok Kamte AC (23 February 1965 – 26 November 2008) was an Indian police officer, serving as the Additional Commissioner of the Mumbai Police supervising the Eastern region. He was killed in action during the 2008 Mumbai attacks. He was posthumously given the Ashoka Chakra on 26 January 2009.

== Personal background ==
The son of Lieutenant-Colonel Marutirao Narayanrao Kamte (August 22, 1929 – 13 January 2014) and his first wife Perm Kamte, Ashok Kamte was born on 23 February 1965 in a Marathi family with a long tradition of police service. His great-grandfather, Rao Bahadur Marutirao Kamte KPM IPM, had served in the Indian Imperial Police from 1895 to 1923, while his grandfather Narayanrao Kamte MBE KFSM also joined the Imperial Police in 1923, eventually serving as the first Indian Inspector-General (Director-General) of the Maharashtra Police from 1947 to 1955.

Kamte's schooling consisted of The Rajkumar College, Rajkot, and then the Kodaikanal International School for five years. He was an international scholarship recipient at Camp Rising Sun in 1980 and subsequently graduated with the Class of 1982.

He completed his bachelor's degree from St. Xavier's College, Mumbai, graduating in 1985 and a post-graduate degree in Arts from the St. Stephen's College, Delhi, 1985–87.

An accomplished athlete, he represented India at the junior power-lifting championship in Peru in 1978.

Ashok Kamte was survived by his wife Vinita, their two sons Rahul and Arjun, and by his father, mother, and sister, Sharmila.

His wife subsequently co-authored a biography of her husband.

== Death ==
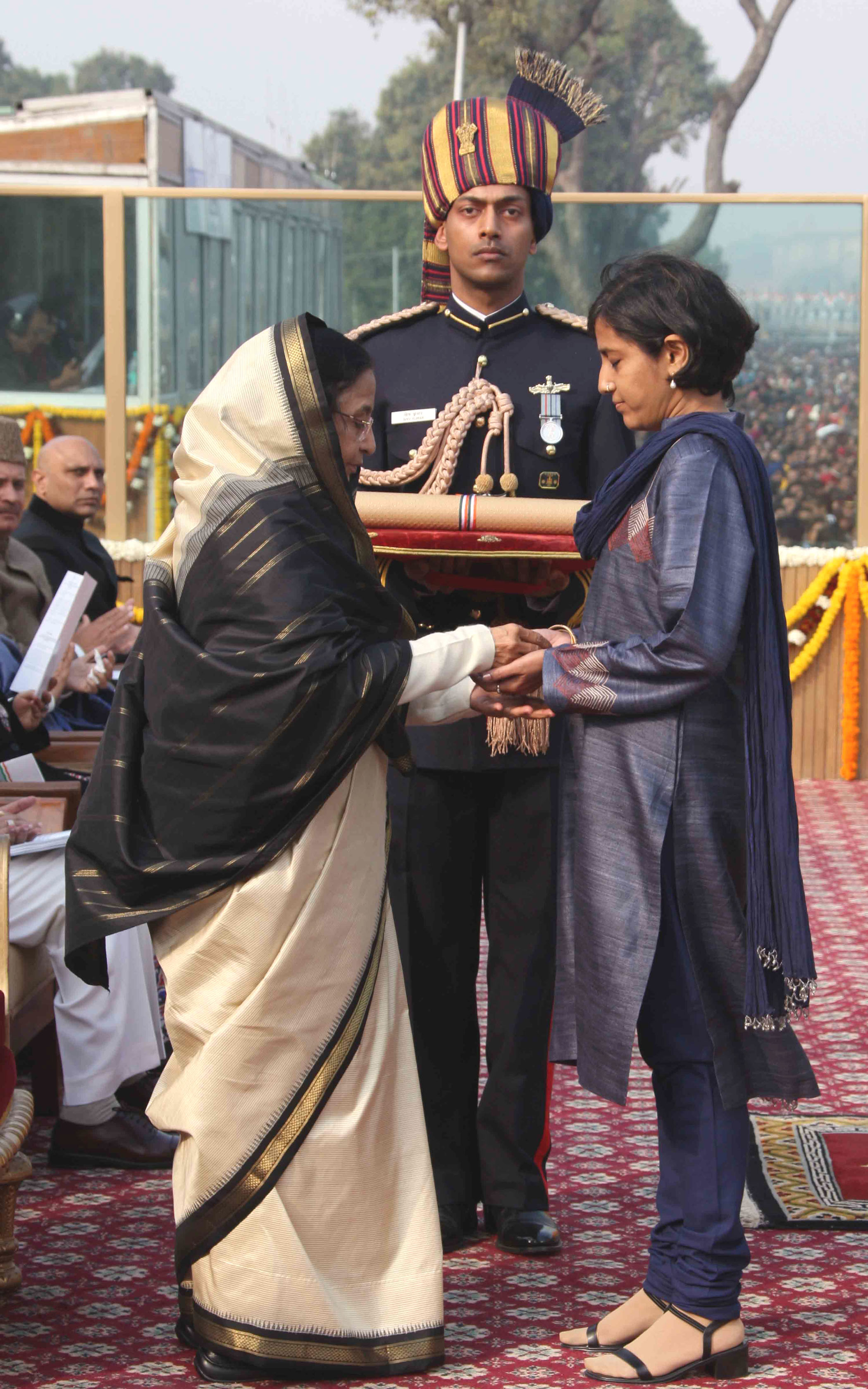
Kamte’s widow Vinita receiving the Ashoka Chakra on behalf of Kamte from President Pratibha Patil on 26 January 2009

Ashok Kamte was killed in action by terrorists during the Mumbai attacks, on 26 November 2008 in a narrow lane between St. Xavier's College and the Rang Bhavan opposite Corporation Bank ATM just a stone away from Crime Branch office.

Kamte was well known for his cool temperament and negotiation skills; during the attacks he offered his assistance due to being Additional Commissioner of the East zone; an area not under attack. When he reached CST area, upon arriving at Azad Maidan Police Station (AMPS) he met with ATS Chief Hemant Karkare and other police officers; they took a Police Toyota Qualis in pursuit of the reported terrorists with Kamte armed with an AK47. When they reached rear entrance of the Cama and Albless Hospital (A women and children's hospital) which is next to AMPS, Kamte spotted and fired at terrorists with the terrorists retaliating by throwing hand grenades; with this situation Kamte suggested that they should take on the terrorists from the front entrance of the Cama. At this point the terrorists had left the Cama area before the Kamte's plan could be implemented; during pursuit the police received a report that the terrorists were hiding behind a red car in the same lane. At around the same time a terrorist was spotted running from the area which Kamte fired at, injuring him. The terrorist Ajmal Kasab was the only terrorist to be captured alive during the attacks. As they were about to get down another Pakistani terrorist, Ismail Khan fired a volley of bullets killing all but Asst. Police Inspector Arun Jadhav. Kamte was hit in the head; although he was wearing helmet with no ballistic vest.

India Express quotes statements by API Arun Jadhav, who was with the officers Ashok Kamte, Vijay Salaskar and Hemant Karkare when they died. The three officers and four constables had received information that Sadanand Date had been injured in the gunfire at the Cama and Albless Hospital for women and children. Currently located at Chhatrapati Shivaji Terminus (CST), a ten-minute drive from the hospital, they took a Toyota Qualis and proceeded in that direction. Kamte was in the passenger seat, Salaskar driving, Karkare in the second row, and the four Constables, including Jadhav, were in the back row of seating. According to Jadhav, five minutes later two terrorists stepped out from behind a tree and opened fire with AK-47 automatic rifles. Kamte was the sole officer who managed to retaliate, wounding terrorist Ajmal in the arm. The six policemen, other than Jadhav, were all killed quickly in the gunfire. The wounded Jadhav had no opportunity to render assistance. The two terrorists approached the vehicle, dumped the bodies of the three officers on the road and, leaving the constables for dead, proceeded to Metro Junction. Upon arrival, they aimed three bursts of automatic fire at police and journalist vehicles drawn up at that location, then drove off towards the government offices (Vidhan Bhawan) in South Mumbai. Here again they fired several times. While attempting to leave the area, one of the tyres of the vehicle burst, so the terrorists departed to obtain another. At this point, Jadhav was able to contact headquarters. The bodies of the dead were promptly recovered and taken to St George Hospital.

Kamte was cremated with state honours at the Vaikunth crematorium on 27 November 2008.

== See also ==
- Havaldar Gajender Singh
- Sandeep Unnikrishnan
- Hemant Karkare
- Vijay Salaskar
- Tukaram Omble
- Sadanand Date
