= Greater Mumbai Police =

Indian police department

Greater Mumbai Police Brihanmumbaī Polīs
- Insignia of the Greater Mumbai Police
- Motto: "To protect good and to destroy the evil"

Agency overview
- Formed: 14 December 1864; 161 years ago

Jurisdictional structure
- Operations jurisdiction: Mumbai, Maharashtra, IN
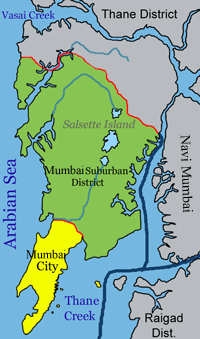
- Greater Mumbai Police operational area
- Area: 603.4 km^{2} (233.0 sq mi)
- Population: 13,662,885
- Legal jurisdiction: Mumbai City and Mumbai Suburban District, MH, IN
- Governing body: Government of Maharashtra
- General nature: Local civilian police

Operational structure
- Headquarters: Mumbai Police Headquarters, Fort District, Mumbai, India
- Police officers: 50,676
- Elected officer responsible: Devendra Fadnavis, Minister of Home Affairs
- Agency executive: Deven Bharti, IPS, Commissioner of Police
- Parent agency: Maharashtra Police

Facilities
- Stations: 94 (Police Stations); 102 (Traffic Police Stations)
- Patrol vehicles: 3,500
- Speedboats: 32
- Helicopters: 5
- Dogs: 52

Website
- mumbaipolice.gov.in

The Greater Mumbai Police (IAST: Brihanmumbaī Pulīs, formerly Bombay City Police) is the police department of the city of Mumbai, Maharashtra. It is a city police commissionerate under the Maharashtra Police and has the primary responsibilities of law enforcement in the city of Mumbai. The force's motto is Sadrakṣaṇāya Khalanigrahaṇāya (transl. To protect Good and to destroy Evil).

It is headed by a Commissioner of Police (CP), an officer of the Indian Police Service. The force is divided into 12 police districts, called zones, each headed by a Deputy Commissioner of Police (DCP), further subdivided into 94 police stations.

== History ==
=== Early history ===
From 1534 until 1661, Mumbai (then known as Bombay) was under Portuguese colonial rule. The Portuguese authorities in Mumbai established a police station in 1661, the same year it was transferred to the English colonial empire. Now being governed by the East India Company, the new city administration established a militia known as the Bhandari Militia (which consisted of approximately 600 Bandareen men supplied by 100 local landowners) in 1669 to combat street gangs that targeted sailors. This new force, which was organised by governor of Bombay Gerald Aungier, was headquartered at Mahim, Sevree and Sion (with a subedar stationed in each headquarter) and used primarily for law enforcement purposes. In 1672, the city administration implemented a policy of having all law enforcement decisions to be subject to judicial review by the judiciary, though the East India Company suffered from a lack of trained judges during the first decades of their control over Mumbai. The situation remained unchanged for decades. By 1682, law enforcement in Mumbai remained stagnant, and there was only one ensign, two corporals and three sergeants in the Bhandari Militia.

=== Creation and early days ===
On 29 March 1780, the office of the Lieutenant of Police was dissolved and the office of Deputy of Police was created. James Tod, the then Lieutenant of Police was appointed as the first Deputy of Police on 5 April 1780. He was tried and dismissed for corruption in 1790. Subsequently, the designation was changed to "Deputy of Police and High Constable".

In 1793, Act XXXIII, Geo. III was promulgated. The post of Deputy of Police was abolished and a post of Superintendent of Police was created in its place, with a Deputy of Superintendent of Police assisting him. Mr. Simon Halliday was the first Superintendent of Police, and governed till 1808. During this time, a thorough revision and re-arrangement of policing in the area outside the Fort was carried out. The troublesome area known as "Dungree and the Woods" was split up into 14 Police divisions, each division being staffed by two English constables and a varying number of Peons (not exceeding 130 for the whole area), who were to be stationary in their respective charges and responsible for dealing with all illegal acts committed within their limits.

=== Post-1857 ===
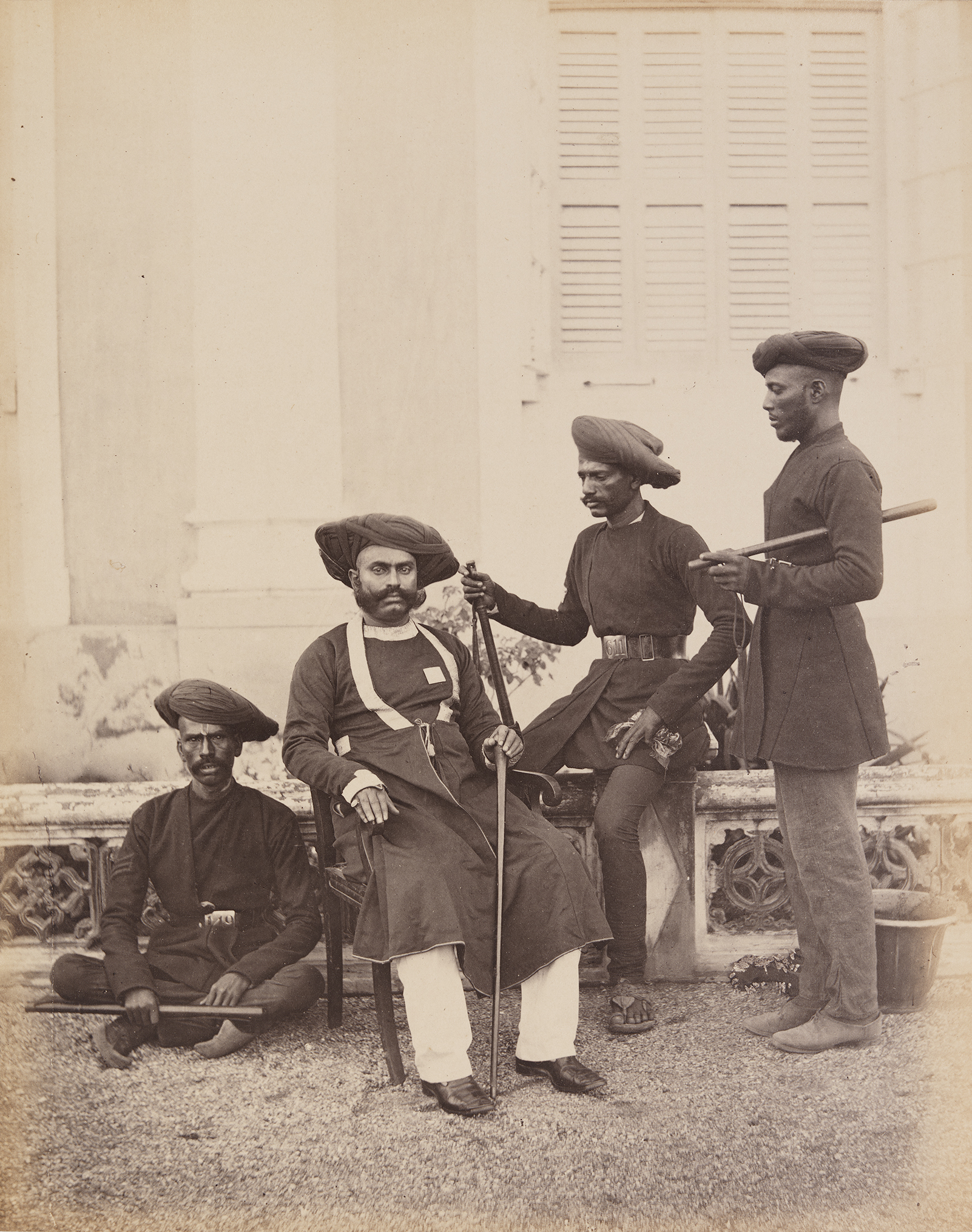
A photograph of four members of the Bombay Police c. 1855–1862

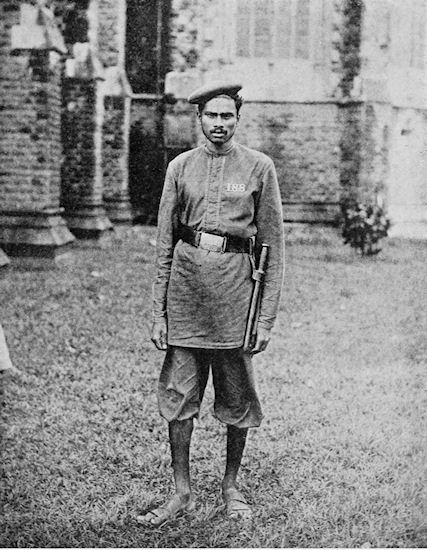
A member of the Bombay Police photographed during the 19th century

Following the establishment of Crown rule in India after the Indian Rebellion of 1857, in 1864 Commissioners of Police were assigned to the three presidency towns of Bombay, Calcutta and Madras. On 14 December 1864, Sir Frank Souter was appointed as the first Police Commissioner of Bombay; in the same year, Khan Bahadur Sheikh Ibrahim Sheikh Imam became the first Indian to be appointed to a senior rank in the Bombay Police, while Souter remained in office for 24 years until 3 July 1888. In 1896, the Police Commissioner of Bombay's office was moved to an Indo-Saracenic building, which it still occupies to this day. The building has been designated as a protected heritage site by the Indian government.

=== After 1947 ===
After independence, many changes to the Bombay Police were instituted. On 15 August 1947, J.S. Bharucha became the first Indian head of the Bombay Police, taking over from the last British Commissioner, Mr. A.E. Caffin. A dog squad was set up in 1965. Computers were first used by the Bombay police in 1976. A Narcotics Cell and an anti-terrorist special operations squad were created in 1989.

The service was renamed to Mumbai Police in 1995, following the renaming of Bombay to Mumbai. In 1995, the control room was computerised, and finally, in 1997, the Mumbai Police went online.

In 2002, the airport police section handed over security to the CISF.

A massive modernization of the Mumbai Police took place in 2005. New vehicles, guns and electronic equipment were procured for police use. The Tourist Squad was also created to patrol the beaches of Mumbai. On 30 May 2009 the Maharashtra government in Mumbai set up a police station dedicated to tackling cyber crime. It is the third such facility in India after Bangalore and Hyderabad. The dedicated police station will now register first information reports (FIRs) on its own and investigate offences pertaining to cyberspace. It is not clear how people abroad may report to Mumbai Cybercell. The police station will take care of all cyber cases in the city including that of terror e-mails. The existing Cyber Crime Investigation Cell of the city police probes cyber offences, but the FIRs are registered in local police stations depending on the site of the offence. A specially trained team of over 25 policemen, headed by an Assistant Commissioner of Police (ACP), were selected for the new job. The facility will function under the supervision of Deputy Commissioner of Police (Preventive) and Joint Commissioner of Police (Crime).

Following the 2008 terrorist attacks in Mumbai, a SWAT like unit was created to combat terrorism. Named as Force One, the unit has been trained in the use of sophisticated arms and explosives, and the personnel are known for their rapid shooting skills. While the National Security Guard has a regional hub in Mumbai, Force One is expected to be part of the initial response to a terror strike in Mumbai.

== Headquarters ==
Mumbai Police Headquarters, opposite Crawford Market.

The Mumbai Police Headquarters are in a Grade II-A listed heritage building that was built in 1894 and designed by John Adams, who also designed the Royal Bombay Yacht Club. It is located opposite Crawford Market in South Mumbai, a mile away from the Victoria Terminus. The construction work started on 17 November 1894 and finished two years later on 24 December 1896. The building was formally opened on 1 January 1897.

The architectural style of the building is Gothic Revival. In contrast to the Maharashtra Police Headquarters in Fort, which uses blue basalt and was built some two decades earlier, this building uses yellow basalt. The building underwent a major restoration in 2017 for the first time in its 120-year history. In 2018, it was announced that a police museum funded by Tata Trusts would open in the building. Since then, there have been no further developments.

== Organisation ==
The Mumbai Police Department is headed by a Police Commissioner, who is an IPS officer. The Mumbai Police comes under the state home department through Maharashtra Police. The city is divided into Twelve police zones and Twenty Five traffic police zones, each headed by a Deputy Commissioner of Police. The Traffic Police is a semi-autonomous body under the Mumbai Police.

The department holds several programs for the welfare of its officials including Retirement Planning Workshop.

=== Geographical division ===
Mumbai police is broadly divided into five regions namely Central, North, South, East and West. For administrative purposes, each region is subdivided into 3 to 4 zones. Each zone contains 3 to 4 police stations. Each zone is commanded by a Deputy Commissioner of Police (DCP). Apart from the 12 zones, there is also an additional Port zone. Police stations under the Port zone keep vigil on the Mumbai Port and container terminals in Mumbai. There are a total of 91 police stations in the jurisdiction of Mumbai Police. Every police station has a Police Inspector who is the in-charge officer of the station.

=== Subunits ===
Mumbai Police is divided into the following units:

- Local Police
- Special Unit Service
- Crime Branch
- Cyber Crime Investigation Cell or Cyber Cell is a wing of Mumbai Police, India, to deal with computer crimes, and to enforce provisions of India's information technology law, namely, the Information Technology Act, 2000, and various cyber crime related provisions of criminal laws, including the Indian Penal Code, and the Companies Act of India subsection on IT-Sector responsibilities of corporate measures to protect cybersecurity. Cyber Crime Investigation Cell is a part of Crime Branch, Criminal Investigation Department of the Mumbai Police.
- Commando Force
- Detection Unit (Mumbai Encounter Squad)
- Anti Terrorist Squad
- Mumbai Traffic Police
- Administration
- Social Service Cell
- Narcotics Cell
- Wireless Cell
- Local Armed Police
- Anti-Extortion Cell
- Modus Operandi Bureau
- Missing Persons Bureau
- Special Branch
- Intelligence Unit
- Protection & Security
- Riot Control Police
- Economic Offenses Wing
- Juvenile AID Protection Unit
- Quick Response Team
- Force One

Each of these units have a Chief of the rank of Joint Commissioner of Police.

== Hierarchy of Greater Mumbai Police ==
Gazetted Officers

Higher officials in Mumbai Police
Insignia
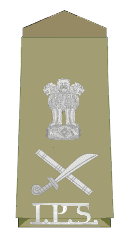
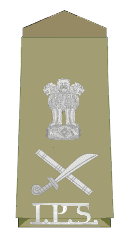
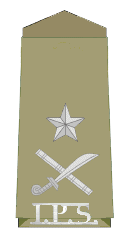
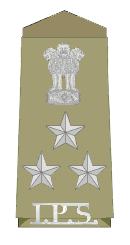
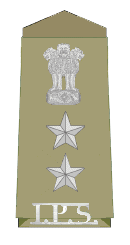
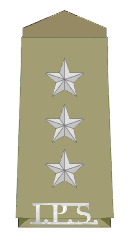
Post/Designation
Commissioner of Police
Special Commissioner of Police
Joint Commissioner of Police
Additional Commissioner of Police
Deputy Commissioner of Police
Assistant Commissioner of Police
Abbreviation
CP
Spl. CP
Jt. CP
Addl. CP
DCP
ACP
Rank
DG / ADG
ADG
IGP
DIG
SP / Addl. SP
DySP / Asst. SP
- These ranks are typically held by officers of the IPS cadre, though some may be occupied by senior state police service officers.
- The Deputy Commissioner of Police (DCP) holds three types of insignia: two stars and state emblem for Selection Grade SP rank; one star and state emblem for SP rank; and state emblem only for Additional SP rank.

|}

Subordinate officers rank insignia
Insignia
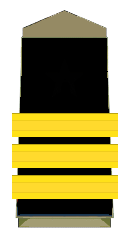
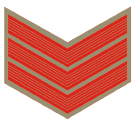
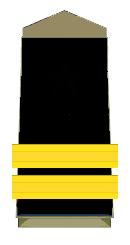
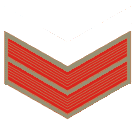
No insignia
Rank
Police Inspector (Note: One-star rank insignia only used in the West Bengal Police. All other police forces use the three-star with red and blue band rank insignia.)
Assistant inspector (Note: This rank exists only in the Maharashtra Police.)
Sub-inspector
Assistant sub-inspector
Head constable (Note: Shoulder insignia rank only used in the Maharashtra Police.)
Senior Constable (Note: This rank is also known as senior constable, constable grade-I, and exists only in some state police forces.)
Police constable
Abbreviation
PI
API
PSI
ASI
HC
PN
PC
- Ranks and Insignia same as Maharashtra State Police.

=== Hierarchy ===
Hierarchy structure of the Mumbai Police
Post/Designation	Abbreviation	Rank	Strength
Commissioner of Police	CP	DG/ADG	1
Special Commissioner of Police	Spl. CP	ADG	1
Joint Commissioner of Police	Jt.CP	IGP	5
Additional Commissioner of Police	Addl. CP	DIG	11
Deputy Commissioner of Police	DCP	SP/Addl.SP	41
Assistant Commissioner of Police	ACP	DySP/Asst.SP	124
Police Inspector	PI	-	977
Assistant Police Inspector	API	-	756
Police Sub Inspector	PSI	-	2850
Assistant Sub Inspector	ASI	-	3329
Head Constable	HC	-	8146
Police Naik	PN	-	60100
Police Constable	PC	-	118666

== Recruitment ==
Those who join the police department through the subordinate services examination of the Maharashtra Public Service Commission enter the force at the lowest ranks of the force. Their starting rank is that of a Police constable. Those who join the police force through the combined competitive examination of the Maharashtra Public Service Commission holds a starting rank of Sub Inspector or Deputy Superintendent of Police of Maharashtra Police Service. Civil Servants who join the police force through the civil service examination conducted by UPSC holds a starting rank of Assistant Superintendent of Police of Indian Police Service cadre. Generally the IPS officers make it to the highest rank of Director General. The Commissioner of Police of Mumbai, an IPS officer is one of the rank of Additional Director General of Police.

== High-profile cases ==
=== 2008 Mumbai attacks ===
Anti-Terrorism Squad Chief Hemant Karkare, Additional Commissioner of Police Ashok Kamte and Encounter specialist Vijay Salaskar were among the policemen who fell to the bullets of the terrorists. Then Joint Commissioner of Mumbai Crime Branch Mr. Rakesh Maria under the leadership of Police Commissioner Hasan Gafoor tackled the abrupt attack by his superb skills. Mr. Ramesh Mahale, then an officer with crime branch investigated the case and brought the lone arrested militant Ajmal Kasab to justice. Police Commissioner Hasan Gafoor was shunted out of his office. Mahale resigned recently over a murder case investigation which he was leading. In the following year, as a response to these attacks, a specialised counter-terrorism unit, Force One was formed and commissioned on 24 November 2009, two days before the anniversary of the 26/11 terror attacks. A Committee was appointed to look into the failures of cops pertaining to the terror attack. The Ram Pradhan Committee, as it came to be known, furnished a report recommending a series of improvements & reforms. The State Government of Maharashtra however never had this report tabled in the legislature fearing a fallout over strictures passed in the report. A Public Interest Litigation has been filed by social activist Ketan Tirodkar to demand equal justice for all the police who were killed in the terror attack; especially for the members of the Bomb Disposal Squad of Mumbai Police. During the hearing of the petition, the Government informed the High Court that the Federal Government of India has rejected the proposal to award the Bomb Disposal Squad of the city police for their contribution in defusing grenades in the terror attack.

=== Sheena Bora murder case ===
Sheena Bora, an executive working for Metro One based in Mumbai, went missing on 24 April 2012. In August 2015, the Mumbai Police had received a tip-off from an unknown man claiming that Sheena Bora had been murdered. After they got in touch with their Counterparts in Pune, they arrested her mother, Indrani Mukerjea, her stepfather Sanjeev Khanna, and her mother's chauffeur, Shyamvar Pinturam Rai, for allegedly abducting and killing her and subsequently burning her corpse. They also arrested Indrani's husband, Peter Mukerjea in connection with the case. Rai has now been allowed to turn approver in the case after he was pardoned by the Bandra Magistrate Court in Mumbai. As of May 2017, Indrani, Peter, and Sanjeev have been lodged in Byculla Women's Prison and Arthur Road Jail in Mumbai, respectively.

=== Shakti Mills Gang Rape ===
In August 2013, several men, including juveniles, were arrested by the Mumbai Police for the gang-rape of a photo journalist and a call center telephone operator. While they were praised for the swift action in catching the culprits, the department faced scrutiny for making the telephone operator go through the two-finger test. The culprits were charged under sections 376(d) for gang rape, 377 for unnatural offence, 120(b) for criminal conspiracy, sections 342 and 343 for wrongful restraint, section 506(2) for criminal intimidation and 34 for common intention and 201 for destruction of evidence under the Indian Penal Code. While the juveniles were sentenced to 3 years in a reform home by the Juvenile Justice Board, 3 of the adult culprits were given a death sentence for repeat offence. The death penalty was eventually commuted to life imprisonment without parole or remission in November 2021.

== Equipment ==
Much of the equipment for the Mumbai Police are manufactured indigenously by the Indian Ordnance Factories controlled by the Ordnance Factories Board, Ministry of Defence, Government of India.

=== Weapons ===
Name	Country of origin	Type	Notes
Pistol Auto 9mm 1A	India	Semi-automatic pistol	
Glock 17	Austria	Semi-automatic pistol	
Smith & Wesson M&P	United States	Semi-automatic pistol	
Heckler & Koch MP5	Germany	Submachine gun	
Joint Venture Protective Carbine	India	Submachine gun	
Lee Enfield SMLE	United Kingdom	Rifle/Sniper	
Ishapore 2A1	India	Rifle/Sniper	
INSAS rifle	India	Rifle/Sniper	
L1A1 SLR	Belgium	Rifle/Sniper	
AK-47	Soviet Union	Rifle/Sniper	
M4 carbine	United States	Rifle/Sniper	
M107 Barrett	United States	Rifle/Sniper	

=== Detail List of Mumbai police's Vehicles ===
C.P.Pool Mumbai Vehicle Fleet
Vehicle Category	Total Vehicle Fleet
Special Purpose Vehicle	50
Transportation Vehicles ( Squad cars )	210
Patrol Vehicles	280
Station Vehicles	960
Response Vehicles	160
Motor Cycles	1405
Police Helicopters	5
Total	3070

72 speed boats have been also ordered.

=== Uniform ===
Peaked caps are worn with an orange band and crown that is less stiff such that it drops downwards. A khaki short sleeve shirt and long pants are worn by most members. The patch of the police force is visible, on the left arm.

== Mumbai police in popular culture ==
Because Bollywood, India's Hindi language film industry, is primarily based in Mumbai, the Mumbai police has been frequently portrayed in films. Some of the prominent ones are listed below:

- Zanjeer (1973)
- Deewaar (1975)
- Don (1978)
- Shaan (1980)
- Baazi (1995)
- Company (2002)
- Chor Machaaye Shor (2002)
- Dum (2003)
- Khakee (2004)
- Aan: Men at Work (2004)
- Dhoom (2004)
- Ab Tak Chhappan (2004)
- Black Friday (2004)
- Khakee (2004)
- Dhoom 2 (2006)
- Shootout at Lokhandwala (2007)
- A Wednesday (2008)
- Mumbai Meri Jaan (2008)
- Slumdog Millionaire (2008)
- Department (2012)
- Talaash (2012)
- Shootout at Wadala (2013)
- The Attacks of 26/11 (2013)
- Dhoom 3 (2013)
- Singham Returns (2014)
- Ab Tak Chhappan 2 (2015)
- Simmba (2018)
- Darbar (2020)
- Mumbai Saga (2021)
- Sooryavanshi (2021)
- Jawan (2023)
- Singham Again (2024)

Most of these films are based on the operational groups most commonly known as Encounter Squads. Officers like Pradeep Sharma, Vijay Salaskar, Praful Bhosale, Ravindra Angre etc. have previously headed these squads. Junior officers Hemant Desai, Ashok Khot, Sachin Waze, Daya Nayak, Uttam Bhosale etc. assisted them.

The popular television show CID starring Shivaji Satam, Dayanand Shetty, Aditya Srivastava, Dinesh Phadnis and produced by B. P. Singh, which aired on Sony Channel, has been based on the Criminal Investigation Department of Mumbai Police. The show was aired from 21 January 1998(pilot episode aired on 29 April 1997), until it concluded on 27 October 2018, and the show has consistently had top ratings. CID also had been featured in the Guinness World Records for having an episode of 111 minutes shot in October 2004 without a single cut. The second season of the show featuring the same cast(except Phadnis), returned to be telecasted starting from 21 December 2024, concluding on 14 December 2025.

== Honours ==
The Ashok Chakra, India's highest civilian honour during peace time, was conferred posthumously upon two Mumbai Police officers – Hemant Karkare and Ashok Kamte who were killed in the line of duty during the 2008 Mumbai attacks. Junior officers like Vijay Salaskar and Tukaram Omble were also posthumously awarded the Ashok Chakra.

== Notable achievements ==
The Cyber Crime App launched by Mumbai Police in 2019 registered 140,000 incidents within one year whereby 132,000 suspicious phone numbers were tracked.

During the monsoon periods, several officers of Mumbai Police have been involved in filling potholes that were not filled by Brihanmumbai Municipal Corporation, in order to facilitate a smooth traffic flow and to prevent road accidents/wrecks. The officers who fill the potholes have received praise, who themselves have criticized the BMC for inaction.

=== Other Initiatives ===
The Mumbai Police features a star studded show called Umang, which is organized to raise funds for welfare of their personnel, mostly lower-ranked ones. Several celebrities appear on the show every year to support the cause.

Every year on the World Environment Day, the Mumbai Police organizes a mass cycling event on the Bandra-Worli Sea Link for awareness of clean environment and reducing pollution. However, due to safety reasons and for smoother traffic flow, bicycles are prohibited on the rest of the days of the year, and can be seized or impounded if riders disobey the norms or fail to pay the traffic penalties.

On 10 October 2024, at the funeral of Ratan Tata, Mumbai Police delivered a ceremonial guard of honour and his body was wrapped in the Indian flag.

== Controversies ==
The Mumbai Police has a history of corruption, police brutality, refusal to file reports, aligning with political entities, professional incompetence, as well as moral policing. The department has also been criticized for overworking and underworking of personnel, especially the constable and Sub-Inspector rank officials. However, in recent times, while situations have been changing, they have not been effective enough and still fall well below international standards, due to the lack of reforms and amendments in the Bombay Police Act of 1951, which is mostly based on the beyond outdated and colonial Police Act, 1861.

The Mumbai Police has been long accused of taking bribes or in local lingo, 'hafta' from any person trying to run a business in lieu of turning a blind eye to various illegalities that the person is committing whether it is encroaching on public property or trying to get off the hook of a drug case.

On 13 January 1982, dreaded gangster Manya Surve was killed in a shootout with Inspector Raja Tambat and ACP Isaque Bagwan, who fired five bullets into his chest and shoulder. Surve's death became known as Mumbai's first recorded encounter killing. The rate of encounter killings increased in the late 1980s and further rose after the 1993 Mumbai bombings; a total of 622 alleged criminals were killed in police encounters from 1982 to 2004.

On 16 November 1991, the Anti-Terrorism Squad, led by Additional Commissioner of Police Aftab Ahmed Khan, laid siege on Lokhandwala Complex to capture gangster Maya Dolas, and 6 others. Khan and his squad were criticized for firing 450 bullets which killed the gangsters, who refused to surrender. However, the ATS officers were exonerated following an inquiry.

Right before the 1993 Bombay bombings, Gul Mohammad, a small-time criminal, confessed to his role in the 1992 riots, his training in Pakistan, and a conspiracy underway to bomb major locations around the city, including the Bombay Stock Exchange, Sahar International Airport and the Shiv Sena Bhavan. However, his conspiracy claim was dismissed by the police as a "mere bluff".

The 2008 terrorist attacks in Mumbai have been ascribed to a large scale intelligence failure by Mumbai Police. The attack also exposed several other weaknesses, such as using antiquated weaponry from World War II, poor marksmanship training, lack of a commando style force like the SWAT in the United States, as well as bureaucratic inefficiency when coordinating with the National Security Guard. Despite not having sophisticated weapons and body armor, the Mumbai Police was able to capture the lone gunman Ajmal Kasab at a roadblock near Girgaum Chowpatty. Another gunman, Ismail Khan was killed the shootout.

In 2003-04 Telgi scam also known as fake-stamp scam broke out in which Mumbai's police commissioner R.S. Sharma came to be arrested along with many other senior officers. Another former police commissioner of Mumbai police Sanjay Pande came to be arrested in stock-exchange scam involving tapping of telephone lines of investors. Encounter specialist Pradeep Sharma came to be arrested in Antilia bomb scare case involving murder of Mansukh Hiren.

Another encounter specialist Daya Nayak absconded while anti-corruption bureau of Mumbai was seeking his custody. Nayak is now facing a criminal accusation of planting drugs upon some youngsters during his tenure with the Anti-terrorist Squad of Maharashtra Police.

A reply filed by Director General of Police Housing Corporation (former Police Commissioner of Mumbai) Arup Patnaik has exposed land-grabbing offence by IASs, IPSs & Bombay High Court Judges wherein six prime plots of land reserved for service quarters of constabulary were usurped by private housing societies of the land-grabbing bureaucrats and judges of Bombay High Court. Three plots of land are located at Worli Sea Face while three are Western-Mumbai suburb Andheri west. This disclosure exposing the biggest organised land-grab operation by bureaucrats & judges was made by Director General of Police Housing Corporation Shri Arupji Patnaiksaheb in his reply to a Public Interest Litigation filed by former journalist Ketan Tirodkar.

In October 2019, it was reported that the non-gazette police officials, mostly the constable rank personnel, who are the lowest ranked and least paid, did not have decent housing, and many of them who were allotted an official accommodation were not satisfied with it due to poor quality and insufficient maintenance. Following complaints and dissatisfaction by the constables and their families, the Maharashtra Housing and Area Development Authority began to redevelop police colonies to improve living conditions in 2023.

On 13 March 2021, Senior Inspector Sachin Vaze, an encounter specialist, was arrested for his involvement in the Antilia bomb scare. Through an investigation, Vaze revealed that he was acting at the behest of Anil Deshmukh, who was then minister of Home Affairs. Vaze was also involved in collecting extortion money in December 2020 from members of the Indian Hotel and Restaurant Association (AHAR). He would call from his office in the Commissioner of Police compound for monthly amounts and, if paid, would ensure that the Social Service Branch would not conduct raids. Mid-Day reported that a source said, "SSB carried out raids at hotels and bars and filed cases against them. The last SSB raid was in early February. After that, no raid was conducted as everybody agreed to pay the money to be able to operate." Vaze was previously involved in the custodial torture and death of Khwaja Yunus in 2004, a suspect in the 2002 Ghatkopar bombing case.

The Traffic Branch of Mumbai Police has faced criticism for hefty penalties on bicyclists for riding on Bandra–Worli Sea Link, as well as for obstructing traffic on other roads due to slow speeds of riders. The fines for bicyclists riding on the Sea Link, as well as on the Trans Harbour Link, Eastern Freeway, the Sahar Elevated Access Road, the BKC-Chunabhatti flyover, and the Coastal Road is Rs 1200(US$15), which has been steeply set and does not conform to the standards of Motor Vehicles Act due to non requirement of license, registration, insurance, and road tax; furthermore, refusal to pay and non-compliance has led to seizure of bicycles, detaining and assaulting of riders, deflating the tires, or towing away bicycles, which constitutes a misconduct by police personnel and violation of rights of those owning non-motorized/self-propelled vehicles. The penalties charged against bicyclists for riding on the prohibited areas as well as various other offenses under sections of the Motor Vehicles Act is unconstitutional and not authorized, as the Act is neither applicable to bicyclists, nor does it mandate any penalties against bicyclists. While penalties against motor vehicles such as two-wheelers, cars and heavy vehicles are mentioned for various offenses on Mumbai Police website as per the Motor Vehicles Act, they explicitly do not state any penalties against bicyclists for certain offenses.

The Mumbai Police has also slammed for incidents of moral policing, which have resulted in serious protests, as well as intervention of judiciary and senior officers -

- In September 2000, the officials banned kissing in the Marine Drive area. They cited the Section 110 of Mumbai Police Act, 1951 which allows the police to interfere in "disorderly behaviour." The decree was later withdrawn after protests.
- In 2012, Assistant Commissioner of Police Vasant Dhoble carried out a series of raids on bars and clubs in and around Mumbai, claiming to rescue prostitutes. In one instance, he labelled four German women wrongly as sex workers in front of cameras when he arrested them on 30 March 2014 from the Voodoo pub. On 5 June 2012, Dhoble raided Masala Curry restaurant after he felt suspicious of women being allowed free entry. Two cousins who were picked up in the raid later filed a defamation case against Dhoble. Due to intense criticism from several civilians, lawyers and activists, and following pressure on the department with lawsuits, Dhoble was fired from the Social Service Branch and transferred.
- On 6 August 2015, Malwani police in Mumbai, raided hotels and guest houses near Aksa Beach and Madh Island, and detained about 40 couples. Most of them were consenting couples in private rooms, but they were charged under Section 110 (Indecent behaviour in public) of the Bombay Police Act and fined ₹1,200 (US$13). Only three cases were filed under Prevention of Immoral Traffic Act. Due to protests and criticism, then Commissioner Rakesh Maria order an investigation into the raids. Following a thorough investigation, Maria sent an order department wide not to use the Section 110 of the Bombay Police Act, 1951 as well as sections 292 to 294 of the Indian Penal Code, which is an offense of Public Indecency to harass citizens and moral police them.
- On 27 December 2015, a senior police inspector along with constable were caught moral policing and thrashing a youth, besides verbally abusing his female friend in Ulhasnagar. The act of moral policing was heavily criticized after a video of the thrashing went viral.
- On 11 February 2024, 3 days before Valentines Day, several personnel from Mumbai police were accused of heckling and extorting money from the couples kissing or hugging in the gardens. Police personnel were keeping an eye on couples and harassed them if the couples were caught kissing or holding hands.

The Mumbai Police has also faced condemnation from the judiciary, National Human Rights Commission, leaders of opposition, besides the general public for taking actions on the orders of political leaders. Additionally, the department has faced criticism for inaction against political leaders for offensive statements and those who have serious criminal charges against them. -

- On 18 November 2012, following the death of Shiv Sena founder Bal Thackeray, Mumbai Police, under the pressure of Shiv Sena workers and activists, arrested a 21-year-old woman who posted a Facebook comment against him, as well as her friend who "liked" the comment. The charges were subsequently dropped in January 2013, and in July 2014, the Government of Maharashtra was ordered to pay compensation of Rs 50,000 to each victim after the National Human Rights Commission noted that the detention was illegal and violated rights to freedom of speech and expression.
- On 14 May 2022, Marathi television actress Ketaki Chitale was arrested by Mumbai Police for allegedly sharing an objectionable post about Nationalist Congress Party (NCP) chief Sharad Pawar. Chitale, who was molested, and her modesty was outraged by the NCP workers, and was later granted bail, was booked under IPC sections 500 (defamation), 501 (printing or engraving defamatory matter) and 153A (promoting enmity between different groups on grounds of religion, race, place of birth, residence, language, etc., and doing acts prejudicial to maintenance of harmony) of the Indian Penal Code.
- On 10 February 2025, the Mumbai Police issued summons and paid a visit to YouTuber Ranveer Allahbadia, popularly known as BeerBiceps, for offensive and vulgar remarks on an episode of India's Got Latent, along with the host and comedian Samay Raina, and social media influencers Ashish Chanchlani, Apoorva Mukhija and Jaspreet Singh. While Allahbadia faced severe public criticism and issued a public apology, the department faced backlash for swift action against the show hosts and judges, as several critics and public figures stated that such quick action is not taken against political leaders who make such offensive, vulgar, and insensitive comments, and that law enforcement and judiciary acts quickly against such events, but not against crimes as serious as rape.
- On 31 March 2025, the Mumbai Police faced criticism by comedian Kunal Kamra questioning the priorities of law enforcement, after some officers visited his old house following summons. Kamra posted on social media about the visit days after his video of his show calling Deputy Chief Minister Eknath Shinde a traitor went viral. As a result of his comment, the club where he made the comment was vandalized by Shiv Sena party workers. While Kamra faced charges under multiple sections of the Bharatiya Nyaya Sanhita, including 353(1)(b), 353(2) (statements conducive to public mischief), and 356(2) (defamation), he refused to apologize for his comments. On 28 March 2025, he was granted interim anticipatory bail by the Madras High Court, despite summons issued by the Mumbai Police and Bombay High Court.

== Reforms and Major Overhauls ==
Due to several events that have caused negative reception of the Mumbai Police, the department has initiated several reforms for last several years to ensure better safety and security of the city. However, the core police functioning under the colonial Police Act of 1861 remains the same, which effectively negates accountability against personnel for misconduct. Furthermore, while the Mumbai Police has a police-to-population ratio of 270 per 100,000 population, which above the state and national ratio of 172 and 153 respectively and meets the UN standards of 222, most of the personnel are deployed for VIP duties and for other tasks, which has caused a work overload.

As a result of the November 2008 terrorist attacks, the Mumbai Police began to replace their World War 2 era Lee–Enfield self loading rifles with modern weapons. A new unit called Force One was also created on the lines of SWAT in the United States.

Following an incident of moral policing committed by personnel of the Malwani Police station in June 2015, which caused major backlash and protests, then Commissioner Rakesh Maria passed an order to all police officers not to use the Section 110 of the Bombay Police Act, 1951 which is an offense of Public Indecency to harass citizens and moral police them.

In September 2021, the Mumbai Police launched the Nirbhaya Squad, for women's safety throughout the city. The department also launched a helpline for immediate assistance at the number 103.

In May 2022, the Mumbai Police implemented an 8-hour shift system for the constable rank officers and assistant sub-inspectors, and 16 hours of rest, after complaints of overworking without breaks caused a major toll on their health. Originally started as a pilot proposal in May 2016 by then Commissioner Dattatray Padsalgikar, it was made permanent, with several subordinate personnel appreciating the initiative.

== See also ==
- Mumbai
- History of Mumbai
- Mumbai Fire Brigade
- Maharashtra Police
- Sheriff of Mumbai

== Literature ==
- Kadam, B. S. Sri; Socio-Historical Study Of Police Administration in Bombay Presidency (1861 to 1947); Kolhapur 1993 (Diss. Shivaji University)
- Kennedy, M. Notes On Criminal Classes in the Bombay Presidency Appendices regarding some Foreign Criminals who occasionally visit the Presidency: Including Hints on the Detection of Counterfeit Coin; Bombay 1908
- Edwardes, Stephen M. (Commissioner of Police); The Bombay City Police: A Historical Sketch, 1672–1916; Bombay u.a. 1923
- Edwardes, Stephen M.; Crime in India: Brief Review of the more Important Offences included in the Annual Criminal Returns with Chapters on Prostitution & Miscellaneous Matters; Oxford u.a. 1924
- Statistiken: gedruckt im: Annual Report of Police for the Town and Island of Bombay, laufende Monatsstatistiken auf Mumbai Police
