= Karkare =

Karkare (Devanagari: करकरे) is a surname commonly used by members of Indian Marathi Brahmin community. Notable people with the surname include:

- Hemant Karkare (1954–2008), Indian police chief
- Vishnu Ramkrishna Karkare (c. 1910–1974), Indian political activist
