= Tukaram Omble =

Indian police officer (1954–2008)

Naik Tukaram Gopal Omble AC
- Naik Omble prior to 2008
- Born: c. 1954; Kedambe, Jaoli, Satara, India
- Died: 27 November 2008 (aged 53–54); Mumbai, India
- Police career
- Department: Mumbai Police. Previously Indian Army Corps of Signals.
- Service years: 1991–2008
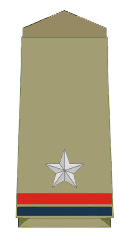
- Rank: Naik (retd), Corps of Signals Assistant sub-inspector
- Awards: Ashoka Chakra

Naik Tukaram Gopal Omble, AC (c. 1954 – 27 November 2008) was an Indian police officer and a former member of the Indian army who served as an assistant sub-inspector (ASI) of the Mumbai Police. He was martyred during the 26/11 attacks, at Girgaon Chowpatty in Mumbai. The Indian government posthumously honoured Omble on 26 January 2009 with the Ashoka Chakra, the country's highest peacetime military award.

== Biography ==
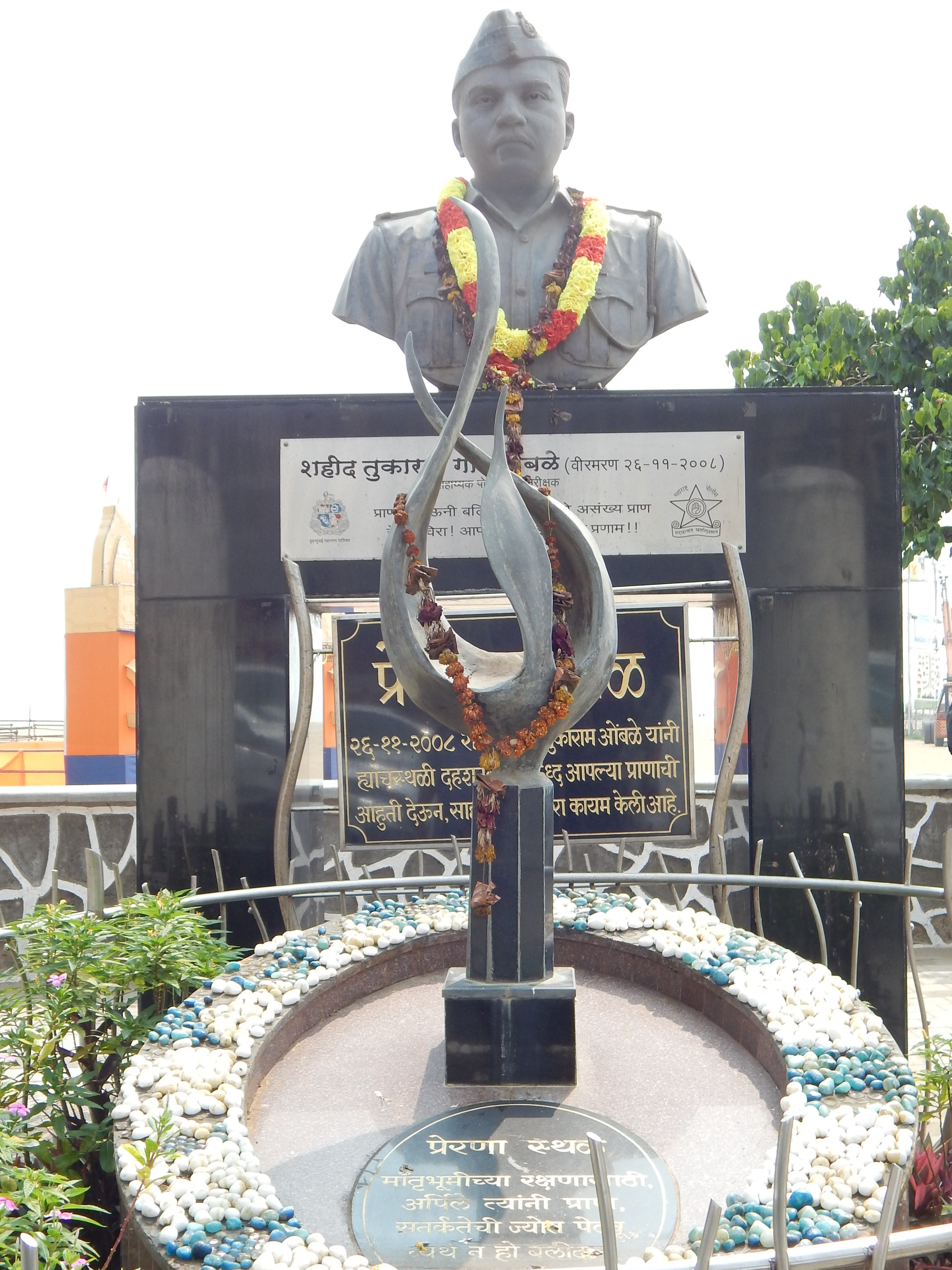
Bust of Tukaram Omble, at Girgaum Chowpatty junction

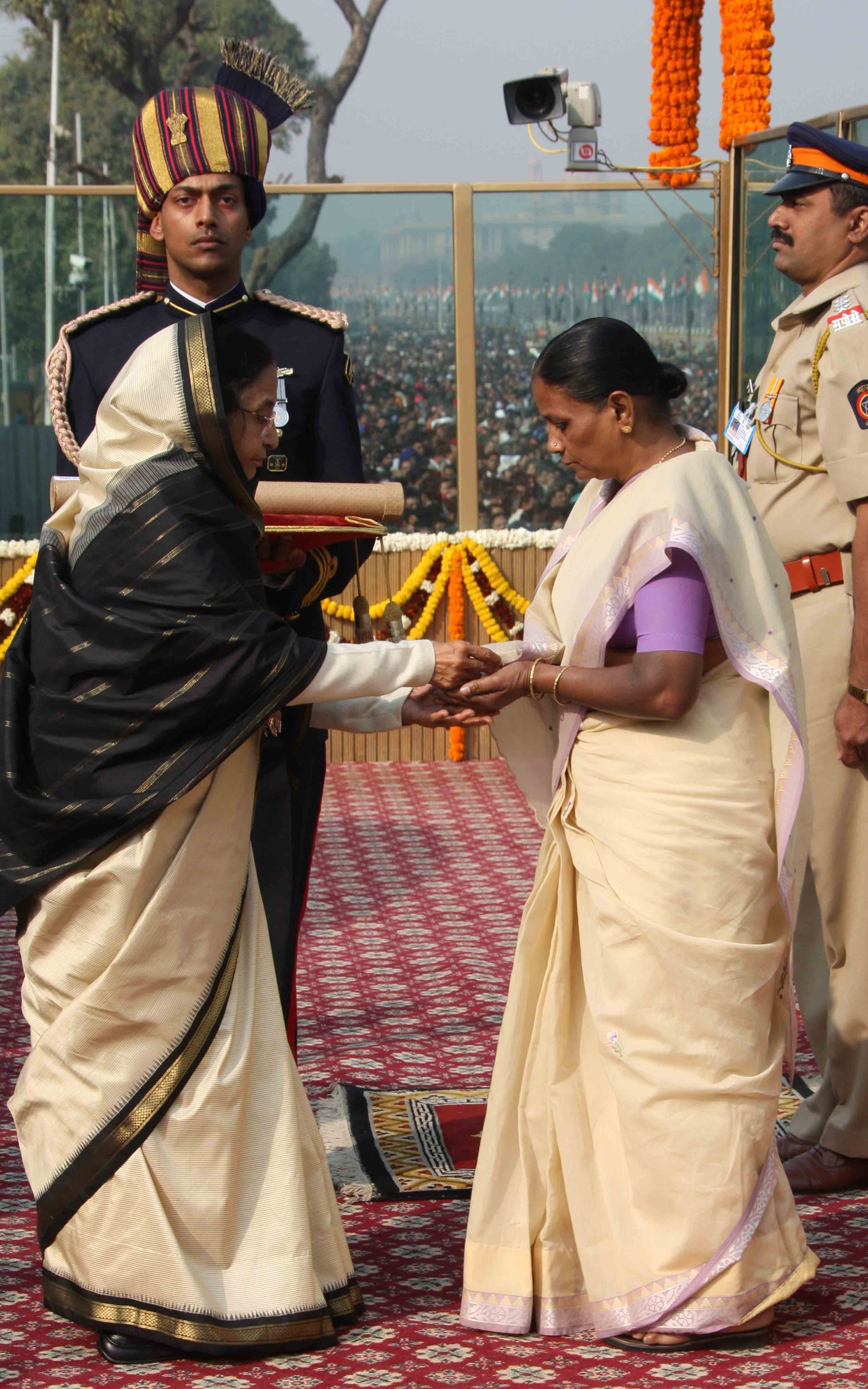
Omble's widow receives the Ashok Chakra from president Pratibha Patil on 26 January 2009.

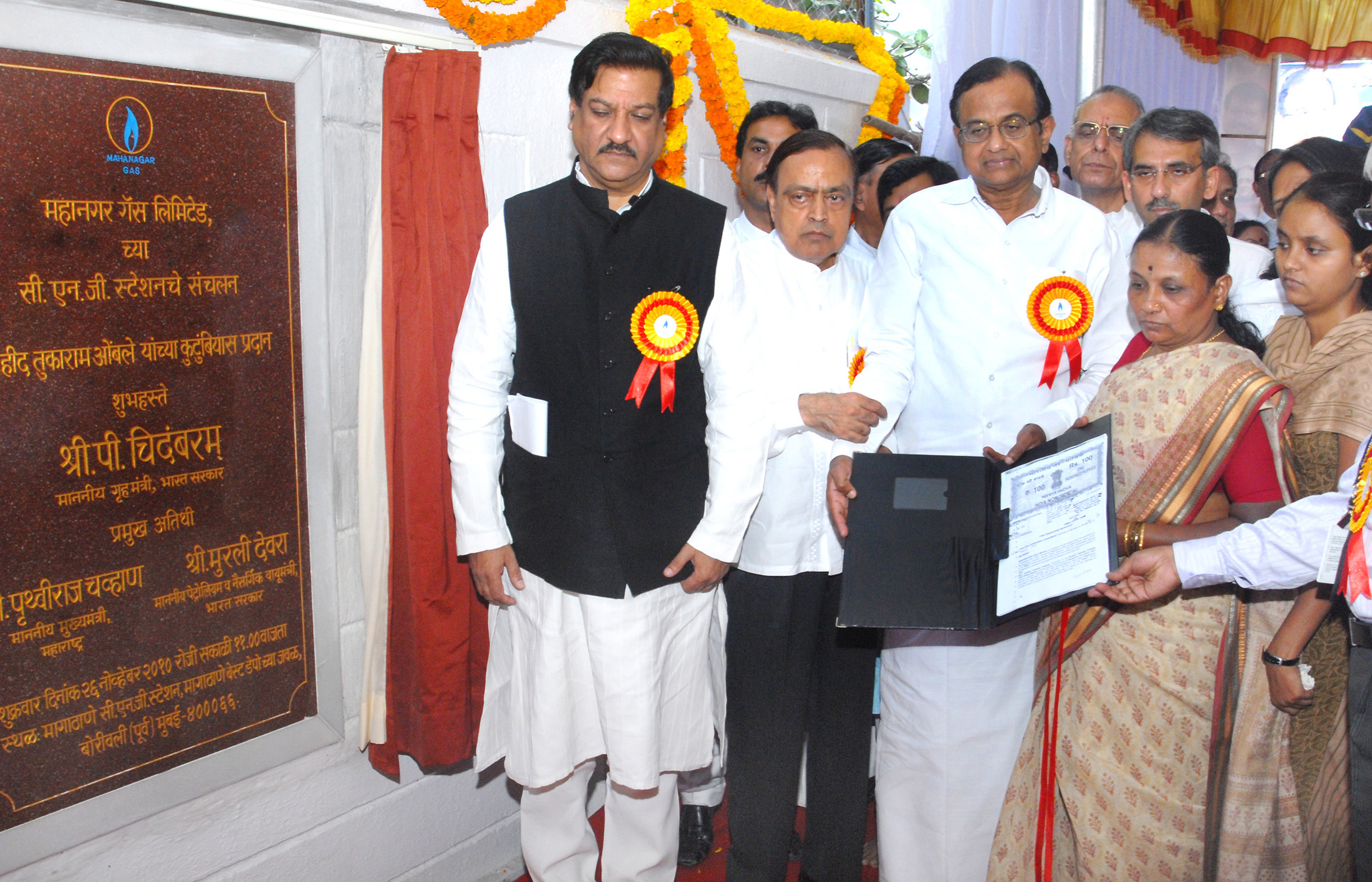
Home Minister P. Chidambaram handing over a CNG fuel Pump to the family of Tukaram Omble.

Omble joined the Mumbai police as a constable in 1991 after retiring from the Indian Army's Signal Corps as a naik. He was an ASI in the Mumbai Police. On 26 November, 2008, he and his team were guarding a checkpoint when they were approached by two terrorists in a hijacked vehicle. After an initial shootout, one of the terrorists died inside the vehicle. The other terrorist, Ajmal Kasab, exited the vehicle and feigned surrender. Omble approached him unarmed, Kasab got up and opened fire. Omble stood in front of him and held on to the barrel of Kasab's rifle and took 12 bullets, which prevented the bullets from injuring anyone else apart from Omble, who died due to this action. Kasab was subsequently apprehended by the rest of Omble's team.

The Government of India later awarded Omble with the Ashoka Chakra in recognition of his actions in helping to apprehend Kasab alive. This helped expose the conspiracy behind the 26/11 attacks.

== Awards and honours ==
- The Ashoka Chakra.
- CNN Indian of the Year award under the category of 'Extraordinary Service to the Nation'.

A jumping spider species from the Maharashtra region was named after him in June 2021.

== See also ==
- Hemant Karkare
- Sandeep Unnikrishnan
- Vijay Salaskar
- Ashok Kamte
- Havaldar Gajender Singh
- Sadanand Date
