= Vasant Dhoble =

Indian police officer

Vasant Dhoble is a former member of Mumbai Police and served for 39 years who retired as Assistant Commissioner of Police in Mumbai. He was head of Mumbai Police's Social Service branch, and has been in the news of late due to his frequent raids on the city's bars and pubs.

He became a controversial personality for his style of functioning as the ACP of the Social Services Branch. He is criticised by some of acting as an extra-constitutional authority or acting as the "Moral Police".

He was transferred from the Social Services Branch to the Vakola Division in September 2012. He was recently transferred again when a hawker died due to a heart attack, during a drive against illegal hawkers.
