= Hemant Karkare =

Indian police officer and Ashoka Chakra recipient (1954–2008)

Joint Commissioner of Police Hemant Karkare AC
- Hemant Karkare (pictured while on duty)
- Born: Hemant Kamlakar Karkare; 12 December 1954; Nagpur, Madhya Pradesh, India (present-day Maharashtra)
- Died: 26 November 2008 (aged 53); Mumbai, Maharashtra, India
- Employer: Indian Police Service (Mumbai Unit)
- Known for: 2008 Mumbai attacks
- Police career
- Country: India
- Department: Indian Police Service; Mumbai Anti-Terrorism Squad
- Service years: 1982–2008
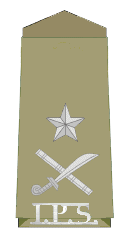
- Rank: Joint Commissioner of Police
- Awards: Ashoka Chakra

Hemant Kamlakar Karkare, AC (12 December 1954 – 26 November 2008) was the chief of the Mumbai Anti-Terrorism Squad (ATS). He was killed in action during the 2008 Mumbai attacks. In 2009, he was posthumously given the Ashoka Chakra, India's highest peacetime gallantry decoration.

Karkare succeeded K. P. Raghuvanshi as the Chief of ATS in January 2008 and was eventually succeeded by Raghuvanshi after he was shot dead on 26 November 2008. He was credited with solving the serial bombing cases in Thane, Vashi and Panvel, and led the investigation of the 2008 Malegaon blasts.

== Early and personal life ==
Hemant Karkare was born in a Maharashtrian family.

He was married to Kavita Karkare (1957–2014), a college professor. They are the parents of two daughters and a son.

== Education and career ==
Karkare did his primary schooling from Chittranjan Das Municipal Primary School, Wardha and then received his middle school and high school education from New English High School, Nagpur. He obtained a Bachelor of Engineering degree in Mechanical Engineering from Visvesvaraya National Institute of Technology, Nagpur in 1975. After graduation he worked for the National Productivity Council of the Government of India and then Hindustan Lever Limited (now called Hindustan Unilever Ltd.), India's largest FMCG company.

== Police service ==
Karkare joined the Indian Police Service (IPS) as a member of the 1982 batch (35RR). Before becoming the ATS Chief of Maharashtra State in January 2008, he was the Joint Commissioner of Police (Administration) of Mumbai. He also served seven years in Austria as an agent of the Research and Analysis Wing (RAW), India's external intelligence agency. According to former senior Mumbai Police officer Y. C. Pawar, Karkare was regarded as very influential officer in police circles.

== Malegaon investigation ==
On 8 September 2006, a series of bomb blasts took place in Malegaon, Maharashtra. On 29 September 2008, three bombs exploded in Modasa, Gujarat and Malegaon, Maharashtra killing eight people, and injuring 80. Several unexploded bombs were found in Ahmedabad, Gujarat. Hemant Karkare, as the chief of the state Anti-Terror Squad, led the investigation into the 2008 Malegaon blasts. In late October 2008, the ATS arrested eleven suspects, including a former ABVP student leader Sadhvi Pragya Singh Thakur, Swami Amritananda alias Dayanand Pandey, a retired Major Ramesh Upadhyay and a serving Army officer Lt. Col. Prasad Shrikant Purohit.

Opposition parties, including the Bharatiya Janta Party and Shiv Sena, and Hindu organizations alleged that the arrests were made under the pressure of the incumbent radical government, in an attempt to appease India's Muslim population. These parties called him 'a traitor to the nation' for his investigation in this direction. Narendra Modi, then the Chief Minister of Gujarat, accused the ATS of undermining the military morale. Some BJP, Rashtriya Swayamsevak Sangh (RSS) and Vishva Hindu Parishad (VHP) leaders accused the ATS of being used as a tool to attack the Sangh Parivar and of using illegal detention and torture. Thakur was given a clean-chit in the chargesheet presented by NIA in 2016 to the court. And the court dropped charges of Maharashtra Control of Organised Crime Act (MCOCA) put by ATS following which she applied for a bail and the Court granted it. The bail order lied that she is "suffering from breast cancer" and was "infirm and cannot even walk without support". She is currently facing charges of Unlawful Activities (Prevention) Act and other Indian Penal Code sections and a trial is ongoing as of April 2019. She contested and won the Bhopal seat during the Lok Sabha elections of 2019.

In July 2025, a Special NIA Court acquitted all seven accused in the case, citing lack of evidence and procedural lapses during the ATS-led investigation. The court noted that no criminal conspiracy could be established as the prosecution failed to establish a clear conspiracy. The verdict effectively discredited the initial investigation led by the Maharashtra ATS under Hemant Karkare, which had been the first to allege the involvement of individuals linked to Hindutva groups in a terror case. It also dismissed statements by former ATS officer Mehboob Mujawar who alleged political pressure to arrest RSS leaders such as Bhagwat Mann as legally inadmissible, though it did not directly evaluate the truth of those claims. During the verdict proceedings in July 2025, the Special NIA Court expressed concern over the methods of detention and interrogation used during the original investigation, noting that confessions appeared to have been extracted through coercive means. The court also observed that some statements recorded by the ATS were inconsistent and may have been obtained under duress or without proper procedural safeguards. The judgement highlighted that the prosecution had withheld key narco-analysis and scientific test reports that were favorable to the accused. The court criticized this as a serious procedural lapse, suggesting that such omissions compromised the fairness of the investigation conducted by the ATS.

== Death ==
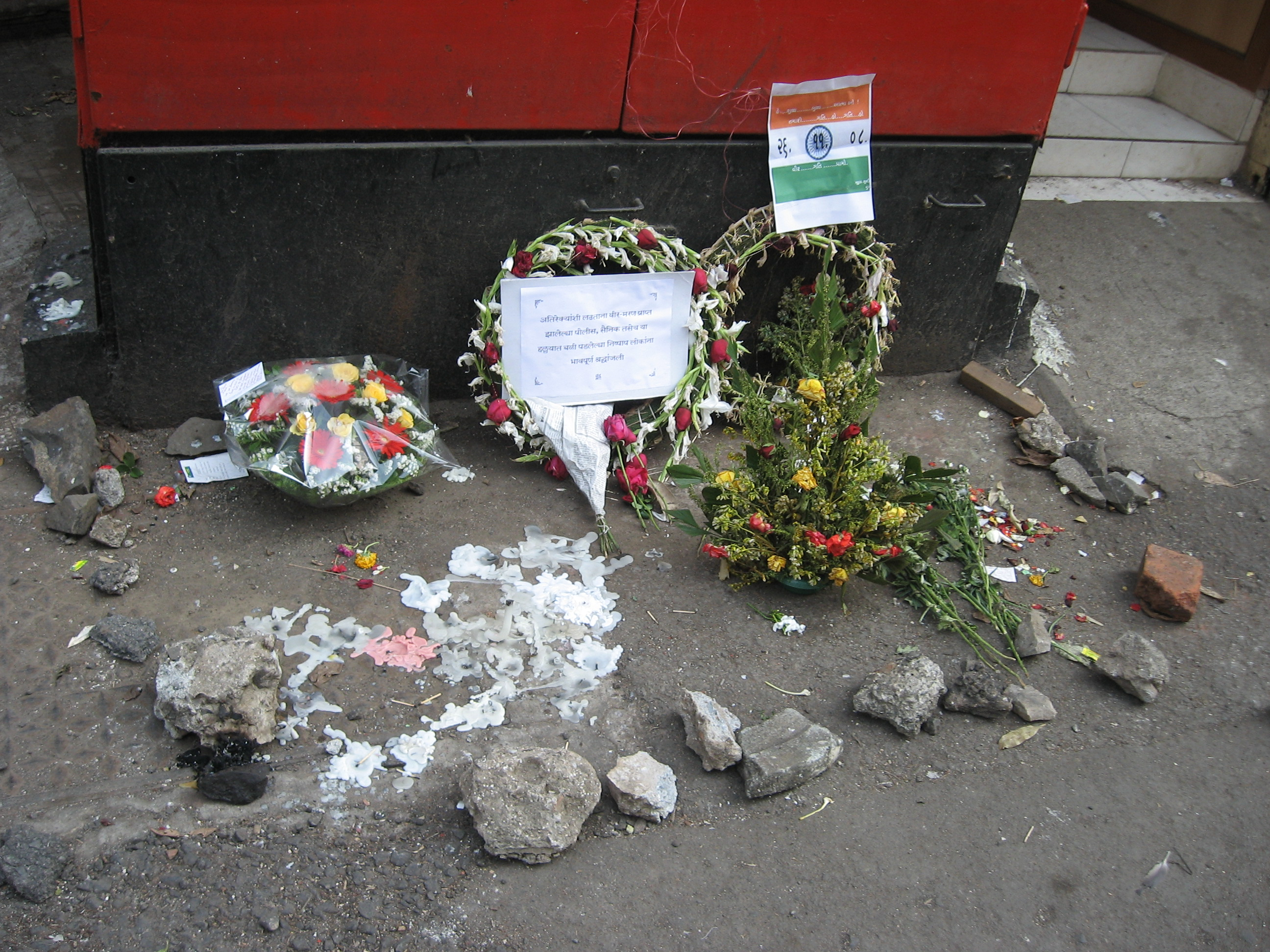
Flowers at a memorial for Hemant

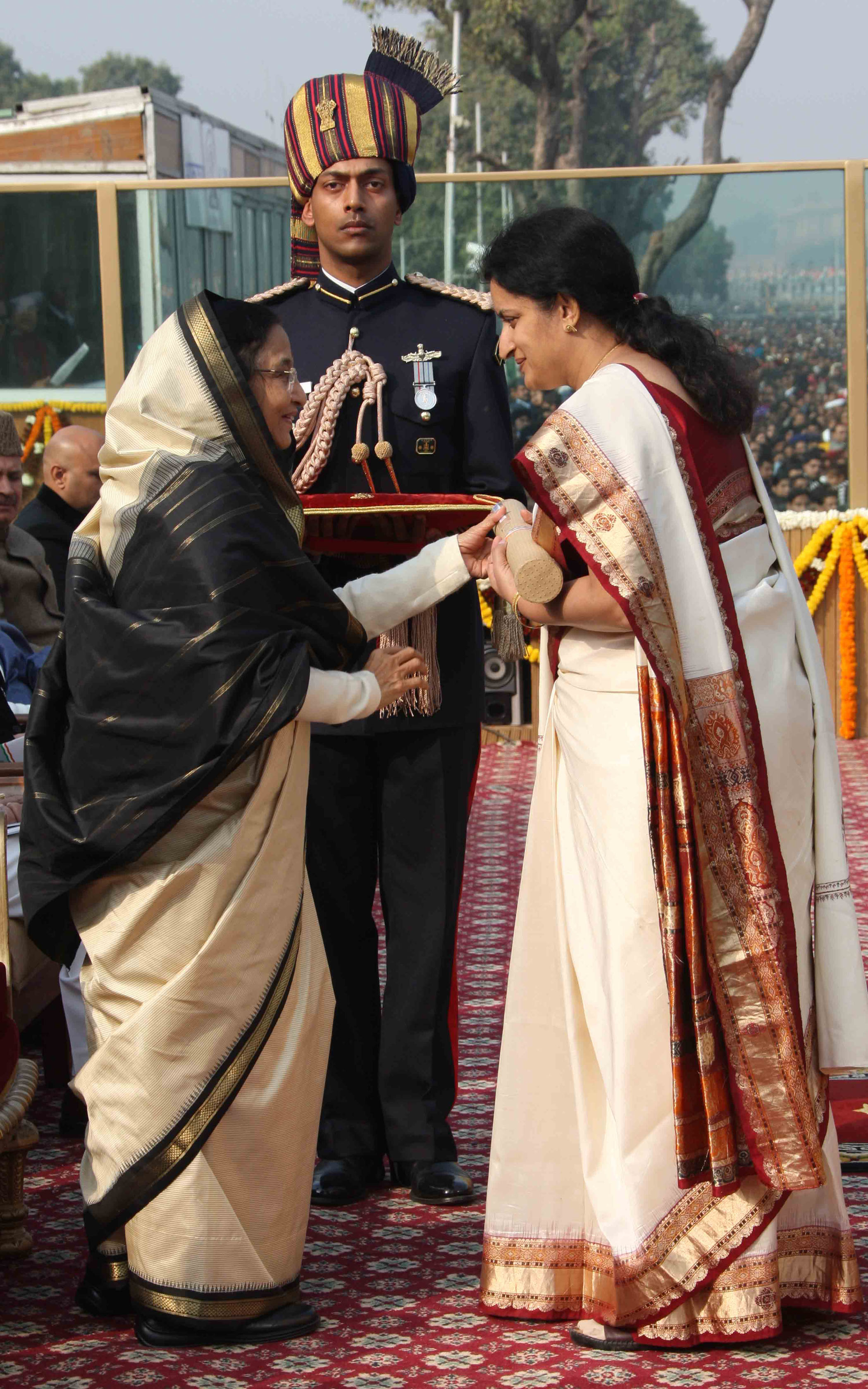
Karkare's late wife Kavita receiving the Ashoka Chakra from President Pratibha Patil on 26 January 2009

At around 9:45 p.m. on 26 November 2008, while dining at his residence in Dadar, Karkare received a call reporting terrorist gunfire at Chhatrapati Shivaji Terminus (CST). Switching on the television to confirm the news, he immediately left for CST with his driver and bodyguards. Upon arrival, he put on a bulletproof vest and helmet—images later broadcast live by news channels—and began coordinating the police response. Finding CST deserted, Karkare was informed that the attackers had moved towards the Cama and Albless Hospital for women and children, located near the Azad Maidan police station.

Upon receiving reports that Assistant Commissioner Sadanand Date had been injured in the exchange of fire at the Cama Hospital, Karkare, along with Additional Commissioner of Police Ashok Kamte and Senior Police Inspector Vijay Salaskar, proceeded towards the hospital in a Toyota Qualis SUV, and grouped with several officers at the front entrance of the hospital, who were armed with pistols, revolvers, and World War 2 era Lee–Enfield bolt action rifles. The 3 officers, along with 2 constables, decided to approach the rear entrance, and with Salaskar was driving, Kamte sat in the passenger seat, and Karkare occupied the middle row.

As the Qualis approached the rear entrance of Cama Hospital, the two terrorists—later identified as Ajmal Kasab and Ismail Khan—who escaped from another entrance of the hospital, emerged from behind a tree and opened fire with AK-47 rifles. Kamte managed to return fire, reportedly injuring Kasab in the arm, but the volley of bullets fired by Kasab and Khan struck Karkare, Kamte, Salaskar, and the constables. Karkare, Kamte, and Salaskar died on the spot from the bullet wounds inside the SUV, while 2 constables, Arun Jadhav and Yogesh Patil, though seriously wounded, survived by feigning death and hid in the 3rd row seats.

The attackers then dragged the bodies of the dead officers out of the vehicle, commandeered the police van, and drove towards Metro Cinema, where they continued their assault, leading to more casualties, including that of the wounded constable Yogesh Patil in the 3rd row of the Qualis, after his phone rang. As the tires of the Qualis burst due to gunfire, Kasab and Khan carjacked a Skoda Octavia, and headed towards Juhu. At that point, an severely wounded Jadhav contacted police headquarters through wireless radio, and based on the information, the DB Marg Police station set a roadblock near Girgaum Chowpatty. At the roadblock, despite warnings to surrender, Khan and Kasab refused and tried to escape, which failed. Moments after their failed escape attempt, a shootout took place at the Skoda, killing Khan, but led to the capture of Kasab, along with the death of Assistant Sub-Inspector Tukaram Omble who tried to disarm Kasab. The bodies of the slain officers were subsequently recovered and taken to St. George Hospital. Kasab was subsequently slapped with various charges during the trial, including the murder of Karkare, Kamte, Salaskar, and Omble.

=== Conspiracy theories ===
Various issues have been raised over the years about the quality of the subsequent investigation and key pieces of evidence. In an investigation, Headlines Today, an Indian news agency, found that a substandard bulletproof jacket had been issued to Mr. Karkare. Though, according to the post mortem report, the quality of the vest was not a factor in his death as bullets did not pierce the vest. Concerns in the media about the quality of the vest continue because the vest itself was, according to Indian authorities, misplaced in the hospital.

The statement that Kasab fired "inside the car" was also rejected by the court. The crucial evidence in Karkare's death - the source of bullet fired into his body was absent. The bullets did not match with few of the terrorist's recovered guns which made it impossible to decide who among the terrorists killed Hemant Karkare.

In the book The Last Bullet, Vinita Kamte - wife of the Additional Commissioner of Police Ashok Kamte who was killed with Karkare in the 26/11 terrorist attacks, alleges that the Mumbai Police ignored crucial information during the attacks. Vinita claims to expose Police Commissioner Rakesh Maria's "feigned ignorance" about the deaths of Kamte, Anti-Terrorism Squad (ATS) chief Karkare and senior inspector Vijay Salaskar in the Rang Bhawan Lane of Mumbai. Vinita also claims that Karkare’s repeated pleas for reinforcement to block the passage of the terrorists fleeing Cama Hospital went unheeded for over an hour.

Who Killed Karkare?: The Real Face of Terrorism in India is a book published in October 2009 by S. M. Mushrif, a former senior Maharashtra Police officer who had previously uncovered the Telgi scam. The Times of India called it controversial.

In 2018, the Bombay High Court discarded a pending petition that had claimed that Karkare was not gunned down by terrorists Ajmal Kasab and Abu Ismail.

== See also ==
- Vijay Salaskar
- Ashok Kamte
- Sadanand Date
