= Gajender Singh Bisht =

Ashoka Chakra recipient (1972–2008)

Havildar Gajender Singh Bisht AC
- Bisht as a Havildar
- Born: 1 July 1972; Dehradun, Uttarakhand
- Died: 28 November 2008 (aged 36); Mumbai, Maharashtra
- Military career
- Allegiance: India
- Branch: Indian Army
- Service years: 1990–2008
- Rank: Havildar
- Units: 51 SAG, NSG; 10 Para (Special Forces)
- Conflicts: Operation Black Tornado
- Awards: Ashoka Chakra

Gajender Singh Bisht (1 July 1972 – 28 November 2008) was an NSG commando and Havildar (Sergeant) who was killed during the 2008 Mumbai attacks. His act of bravery was honored with the Ashoka Chakra award by the President of India on India's 60th Republic Day on 26 January 2009.

== Childhood ==
Hailing from Ganeshpur in Dehradun, Uttarakhand, young Gajender Singh studied at the Janata Inter College in Naya Gaon. He was remembered by his teachers as a disciplined student who participated in every event organised in the school, sports or cultural activities. He had a particular interest in boxing.

== Operation Black Tornado ==
Gajender Singh was a member of the National Security Guard’s 51 Special Action Group. He was part of the team of NSG commandos who were fast-roped onto the roof of Nariman House in an operation to neutralize the terrorists inside who were holding at least six hostages.

According to Jyoti Krishna Dutt, Director General of the NSG, Singh was leading one of the teams that entered the building. The team came under intense fire from the terrorists and returned fire while trying to dominate the situation. The terrorists also hurled several grenades at the commandos. At this point, Singh had the option of retreating with his team. However, he realized that they had to seize this opportunity and continued moving ahead. Rather than turn his back on the militants, he instead created a way for the other commandos despite a grenade thrown at him. Despite sustaining multiple bullet injuries while doing so, he moved forward and ultimately succumbed to his injuries. This enabled his team to secure a dominating position in the encounter.

== Death ==
While securing the Nariman House during Operation Black Tornado, Singh, a member of the Parachute Regiment was fatally wounded while storming the Jewish centre.

== Ashoka Chakra Award Citation ==
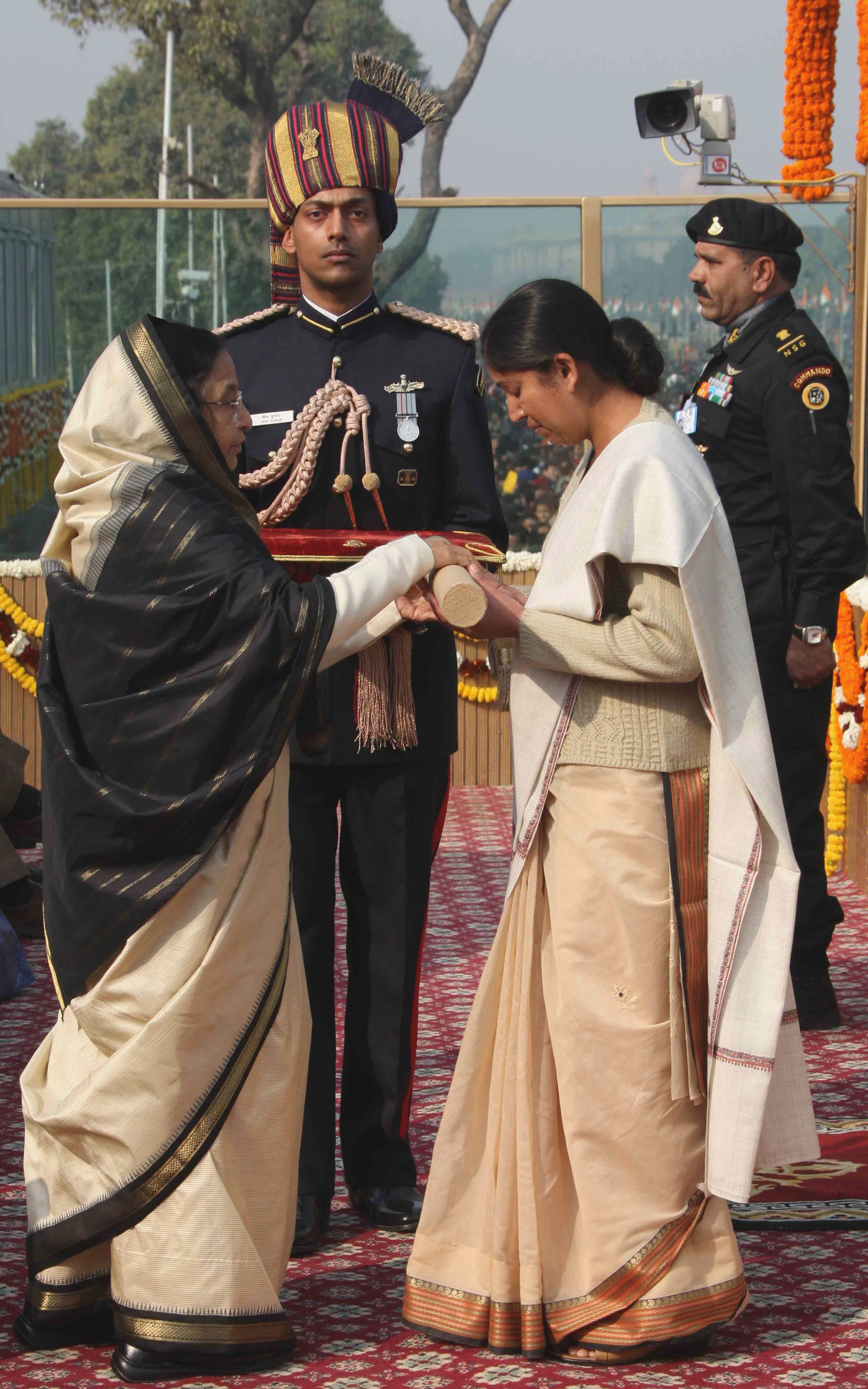
Gajender Singh Bisht's widow receives the Ashok Chakra from president Pratibha Patil on 26 January 2009.

The official citation for the Ashoka Chakra Award reads:

4073611 HAVILDAR GAJENDER SINGH PARACHUTE REGIMENT / 51 SPECIAL ACTION GROUP (POSTHUMOUS)

In the night of 27th November 2008, Havildar Gajender Singh was leading his squad in the operation to rescue hostages from the terrorists at Nariman House, Mumbai.

After clearing the top floor of the terrorists, he reached the place where the terrorists had taken position. As he closed in, the terrorists hurled a grenade injuring him. Undeterred, he kept firing and closing in on the terrorists by exposing himself to the hostile fire. In the act, he injured one of the terrorists and forced the others to retreat inside a room. He continued the encounter till he succumbed to his injuries.

Havildar Gajender Singh displayed most conspicuous courage against grave odds and made the supreme sacrifice for the nation in combating the terrorists.

== See also ==
- Hemant Karkare
- Sandeep Unnikrishnan
- Vijay Salaskar
- Ashok Kamte
- Tukaram Omble
