= Sanjeev Jaiswal =

Indian film actor (born 1988)

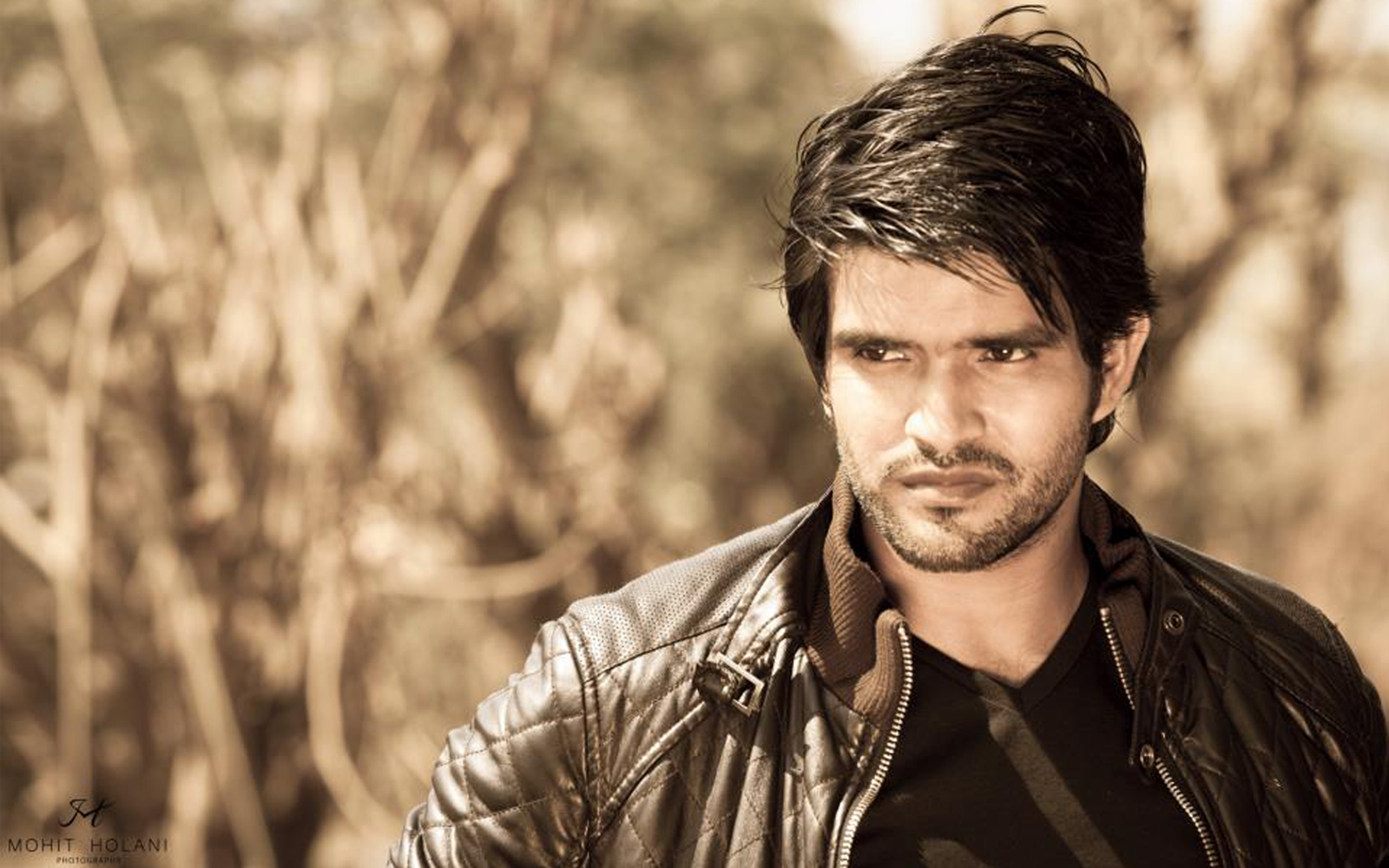
- Born: 18 February 1988 (age 38); Jamshedpur, Jharkhand, India
- Occupation: Actor
- Years active: 2005–present
- Known for: The Attacks of 26/11

Sanjeev Jaiswal (born 18 February 1988) is an Indian actor known for his roles in Hindi films. Jaiswal made his debut in the film Shaitan in which he played the role of a police informer. He then featured in the film The Attacks of 26/11, a film based on the 2008 Mumbai attacks, in which he played lead role of Mohammed Ajmal Amir Kasab.

In 2019, he starred in Devaki, a bilingual film released in Kannada and Tamil.

== Personal life ==
Jaiswal was born on 18 February 1988 to Hindu parents in Jamshedpur, Jharkhand, India. His father is a businessman from Jamshedpur and his mother is a housewife. He has one elder brother and two younger brothers. Jaiswal grew up in Jamshedpur where he attended Motilal Nehru Public School. Through IGNOU, he earned a bachelor's degree in arts. Jaiswal also did theater in Delhi while pursuing a graduation degree.

== Career ==
Early in his career, he was recognized for his theatre work in Delhi. He did theatre in Delhi from 2005 to 2008. He was also selected as one of the ten finalists in the Delhi audition of Zee TV's India's Best Cinestars Ki Khoj in 2008. He then moved to Mumbai in 2008 and there he played a small role in an advertisement of the 2008 Indian Premier League. He then played small roles in TV serials. In 2012, he worked as an assistant director in a TV serial Sasural Genda Phool. He also gave a voice over in an animation film based on Mahabharat.

In 2013, Jaiswal played the lead antagonist in the Ram Gopal Varma directorial The Attacks Of 26/11. After auditioning 500 applicants, Varma found Sanjeev Jaiswal to play Ajmal Kasab, the prime accused terrorist in the 26/11 attack in Mumbai. The film released on 1 March and Jaiswal's performance was appreciated by both the audience and critics. In a press conference, Jaiswal said his biggest challenge was that people shouldn't feel that he won the role just because he resembled the terrorist. Talking about the response to the film, Jaiswal said that people hated the character he played, but liked him as an actor.

His performance in the film received praise from actors Amitabh Bachchan and Abhishek Bachchan, director Shekhar Kapur as well as politician L. K. Advani, who was moved to tears during the film's climax.

In 2022, Sanjeev attended the Jharkhand National Film Festival, in Jamshedpur.

== Filmography ==
Key
†	Denotes films that have not yet been released

Year	Film	Role	References
2011	Shaitan	Police Informer	
2013	The Attacks of 26/11	Mohammed Ajmal Amir Kasab	
2015	Bajrangi Bhaijaan	Shopkeeper	
2018	BoysToys	Ronak	
2019	Romeo Akbar Walter	Deewan	
2019	Devaki	Kidnapper	
2022	Court Kachari	Deepak	
2024	Ae Watan Mere Watan		
TBA	Bagawat†	Brahmarakshas	

== See also ==
- List of people from Jamshedpur
