= Vijay Salaskar =

Indian policeman (1957–2008)

Police Inspector Vijay Salaskar AC
- Born: 5 April 1957; India
- Died: 26 November 2008 (aged 51); Mumbai, Maharashtra, India
- Other name: Encounter Specialist
- Employer: Maharashtra Police Department (Mumbai Unit)
- Relatives: Hemlata Salaskar (mother); Smita Salaskar (wife); Divya Salaskar (daughter)
- Police career
- Country: India
- Department: Anti-Extortion Cell, Mumbai
- Service years: 1983-2008
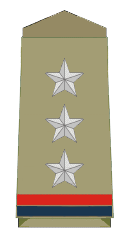
- Rank: Police Senior Inspector alias Station House Officer
- Awards: Ashoka Chakra

Vijay Salaskar, AC (5 April 1957 – 26 November 2008) was an Indian police inspector and encounter specialist with the Mumbai police. He was widely credited with killing 75–80 criminals in encounters, most of which were members of the Arun Gawli gang. Salaskar was killed in action during the 2008 Mumbai attacks, with captured terrorist Ajmal Amir Kasab claiming responsibility for the killing. Before his death, Salaskar was head of the Anti-Extortion Cell, Mumbai. His patriotism and bravery was honoured with the Ashoka Chakra on 26 January 2009.

== Early life and his career ==
He joined Bombay Police (now Mumbai Police) as a sub inspector in 1983. India Today reports Salaskar's first lethal encounter occurred during his first year of appointment, when he shot dead Raja Shahabuddin, known to police on several counts. Salaskar, who was reportedly sidelined for the last two years for unearthing the gutka-underworld nexus, was recently attached to the crime branch, where he headed the anti-extortion cell. An officer of the 1983 batch, Salaskar in his 24 years of service had eliminated many criminals. According to sources, the police officer had once even gone hunting for former don Arun Gawli. But Gawli fled from the scene, forcing Salaskar to return empty-handed. However, Salaskar got even by killing his two trusted men, Sada Pawle and Vijay Tandel, in 1997, triggering allegations that the encounters were fake.

This is what Salaskar said in 2004 about Gawli. "Gawli may have become an MLA. But for me, he continues to remain a former Mumbai don and I have to keep tabs on his activities. If I get any information of his group's involvement in a crime or learn about any shady activity going on at Dagdi Chawl, I will not hesitate to raid his Byculla residence. If I have to arrest him, I will not refrain from doing so. Now that Gawli is an MLA, arresting him will involve certain procedures. I will not bow to any political pressure. I will only take orders from the police commissioner, who is my supreme commander. It was embarrassing that khaki-clad policemen would be deployed to protect Gawli. In the past, we refused him police protection on several occasions. At that time, I had gunned down several of his top henchmen and so he was scared of me. But if Gawli is really reformed, he should not be afraid of me or any other policeman. We do not target innocent persons."

== Death ==
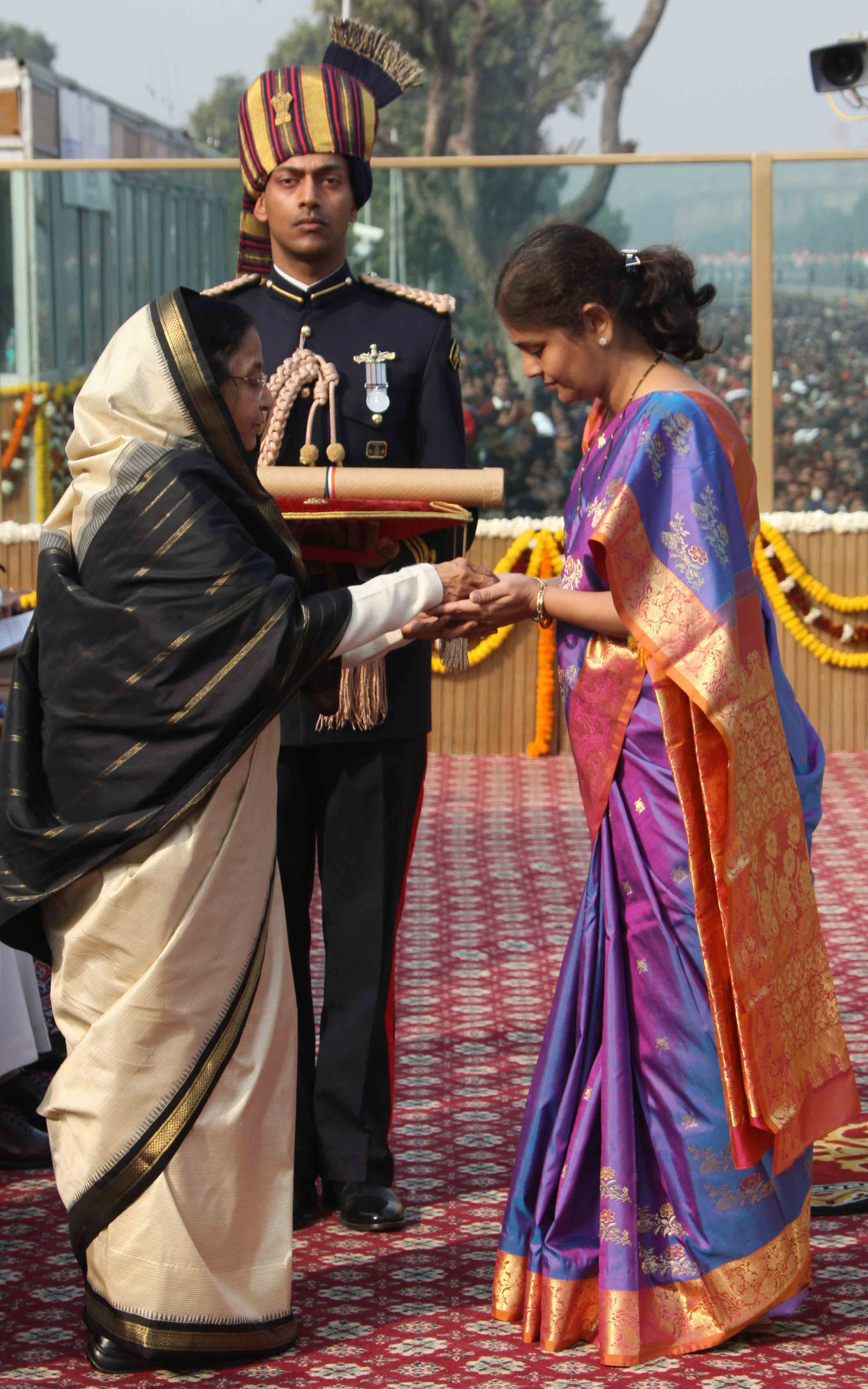
Salaskar's widow Smita receiving the Ashoka Chakra from president Pratibha Patil on 26 January 2009

Vijay Salaskar was killed in action by terrorists during the Mumbai attacks, on 26 November 2008.

India Express quotes statements by Constable Arun Jadhav, who was with the officers Vijay Salaskar, Ashok Kamte and Hemant Karkare when they died. The three officers and four constables had received information that Sadanand Date had been wounded while resisting hostile terrorist action at the Cama and Albless Hospital for women and children. Currently located at Chhatrapati Shivaji Maharaj Terminus (CSMT), a ten-minute drive from the hospital, they took a Toyota Qualis and proceeded in that direction. Salaskar was driving, Ashok Kamte in the passenger seat, Hemant Karkare in the second row, and the four Constables, including Jadhav, were in the back row of seating. According to Jadhav, five minutes later two terrorists stepped out from behind a tree and opened fire with AK-47 automatic rifles. The six policemen, other than Jadhav, were all killed quickly in the gunfire. The wounded Jadhav had no opportunity to render assistance. The two terrorists approached the vehicle, dumped the bodies of the three officers on the road and, leaving the constables for dead, proceeded to Metro Junction. Upon arrival, they aimed three bursts of automatic fire at police and journalist vehicles drawn up at that location, then drove off towards the government offices (Vidhan Bhawan) in South Mumbai. Here again they fired several times. While attempting to leave the area, one of the tyres of the vehicle burst, so the terrorists departed to obtain another. At this point, Jadhav was able to contact headquarters. The bodies of the dead were promptly recovered and taken to St George Hospital.

== See also ==
- Sandeep Unnikrishnan
- Havaldar Gajendra Singh
- Hemant Karkare
- Ashok Kamte
- Sadanand Date
