= Devaki (2019 film) =

2019 Kannada crime thriller film

- Theatrical release poster
- Directed by: H. Lohith
- Written by: H. Lohith
- Produced by: Akshay C. S. Ravish R.
- Starring: Priyanka Upendra; Kishore; Aishwarya Upendra
- Cinematography: H. C. Venu
- Edited by: Ravichandran C.
- Music by: Nobin Paul
- Production company: RCS Banner
- Release date: 5 July 2019
- Running time: 129 minutes
- Country: India
- Language: Kannada

Devaki is a 2019 Indian Kannada-language crime thriller film written and directed by H. Lohith and produced by Akshay C.S. and Ravish R.C. The film was produced under RCS Banner. It stars Priyanka Upendra and Kishore along with Aishwarya Upendra. The supporting cast includes Bollywood actor Sanjeev Jaiswal known for his role in the film – The Attacks of 26/11 . The score is by Nobin Paul, and the cinematography is by H.C. Venu. The film was edited by Ravichandran. The film marks the first appearance of Aishwarya Upendra, opposite her mother.

The film was announced soon after the success of Upendra and Lohith's movie Mummy. This is their second collaboration. The London Economic newspaper cited this movie as one of the examples of Indian thriller movies of 2019 which have the potential to gain global attention due to the absence of songs – which it considered as a staple in Indian movies irrespective of the genre.

== Cast ==
- Priyanka Upendra as Devaki
- Kishore as Inspector
- Aishwarya Upendra as Devaki's Daughter
- Sanjeev Jaiswal as a kidnapper

== Plot ==
Devaki, a single mother, lives with her 10-year-old daughter Aaradhya in Kolkata. One evening, Aaradhya visits a radio station for an audition—and never returns unable to locate her daughter, Devaki reports the disappearance to the local police. Initially, they appear indifferent and unhelpful. An earnest Kannadiga inspector (Kishore) stationed in Kolkata intervenes and takes charge of the case, Devaki and the inspector retrace Aaradhya’s steps around the radio station and nearby areas, finding stray clues that lead them deeper into the city’s dark underbelly. They uncover a kidnapping and trafficking ring operating in Kolkata’s red‑light districts. Their investigation reveals a network that abducts children from innocent families. As they probe, Devaki faces emotional breakdowns, while the inspector uncovers his own past and motivations guiding him in the enquiry. The pair pieces together evidence by visiting dilapidated tenements, questioning locals, and tracing suspicious drop‑off points. A key breakthrough emerges when they discover Aaradhya’s presence in a hidden location tied to the trafficking ring . In the film’s climax, Devaki and the inspector confront the kidnappers in a tense raid and rescue Aaradhya, who’s physically safe but deeply traumatized. In the end, Devaki reuniting with Aaradhya, a mother and daughter embrace, and they leave together as police secure the traffickers .

== Soundtrack ==
The film's score was composed by Nobin Paul.

== Production ==
The film was first titled Howrah Bridge. Following the success of actor-director duo in Mummy, Lohith announced his next project with Upendra. Later, her daughter was cast to play a pivotal role. Kishore was signed to the project to play the antagonist. Three-fourths of the film was shot in Kolkata, with some portions shot in Bengaluru and Mysuru.

== Release ==
The official first look and teaser of the film was released on 13 March 2019. The theatrical trailer debuted on 27 June 2019. The film was released on 5 July 2019.

== Home media ==
The film was made available to stream on OTT platform Amazon Prime on 21 February 2020.

== Critical reception ==
The Times of India paper rated the movie 4/5 and wrote that, "Devaki is not the usual outing that one would go to. It can leave one teary-eyed, especially towards the end of the film. If you're looking for an experience that brings in something new, then this is for you." The New Indian Express paper rated the film 4/5 and wrote "In his second outing after Mummy – Save Me, director Lohith has again displayed a shade of the mark of a genius. It is not just perfection that comes to the fore in Devaki, but the opening of new frontiers, inviting the audience to the kingdom of ingenuity. There is not a scintilla of mediocrity in his execution, which is enhanced by Kolkata’s vibrant yet moody aura. A suspense thriller, Devaki is a film about love and loss, told with a lot of sensitivity. A must watch." The Bangalore Mirror said, "Technically, this is one of the better films you have seen." Aravind Shwetha of The News Minute gave three stars out of five and said, "Devaki manages to keep us invested all through. But for its slow pace, this is a film that deserves a watch." Vivek M V of The Deccan Herald gave three and a half out of five stars and noted, "Devaki, after Bell Bottom, is another thriller that deserves a watch in the theatres."
