= Mumbai Traffic Police =

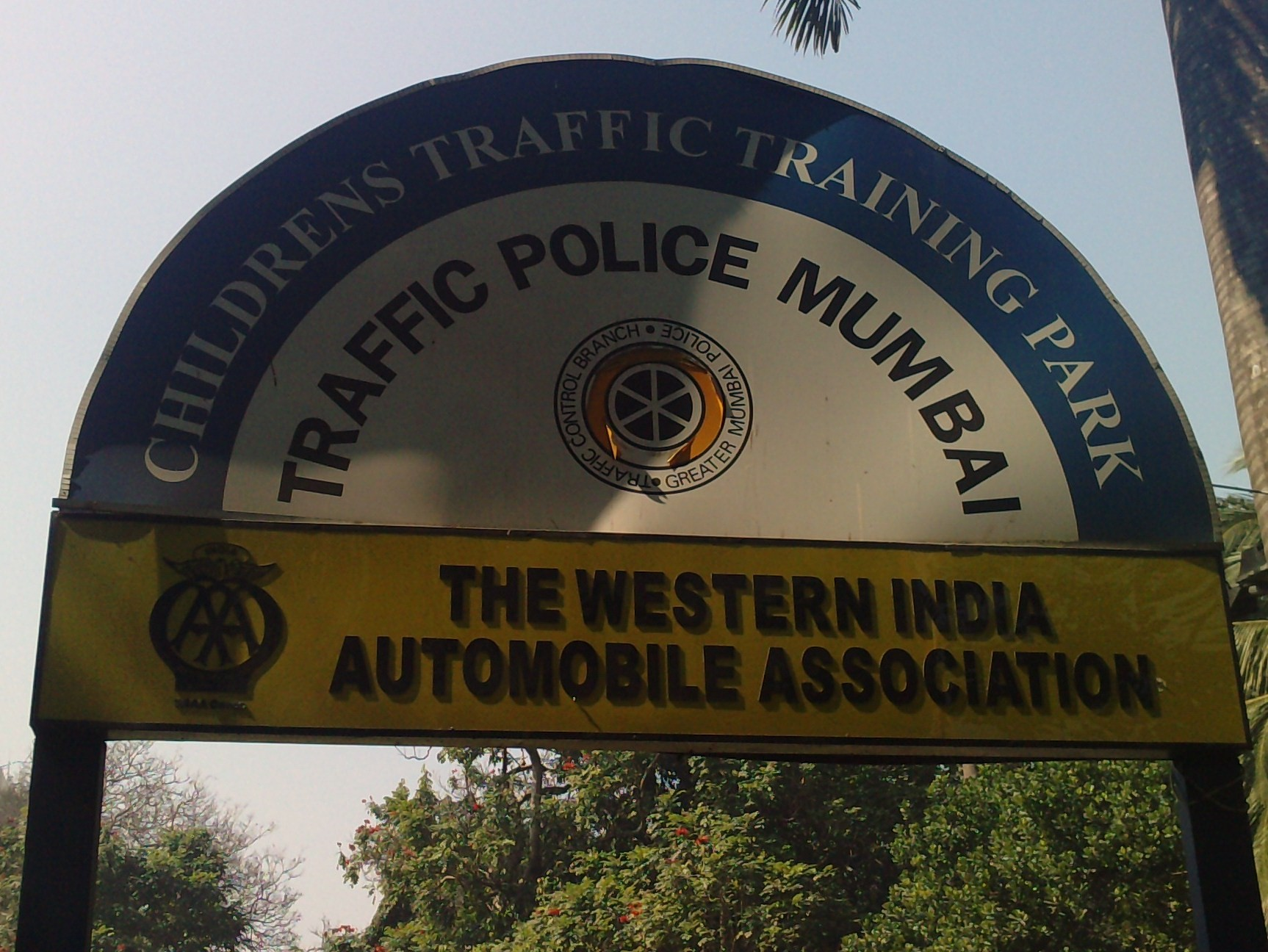
Children's Traffic Training Park, Mumbai

Mumbai traffic police is the organisation entrusted with the task of managing vehicular traffic in Mumbai, India.

== See also ==
- Public transport in Mumbai
