= Metro Junction Mall =

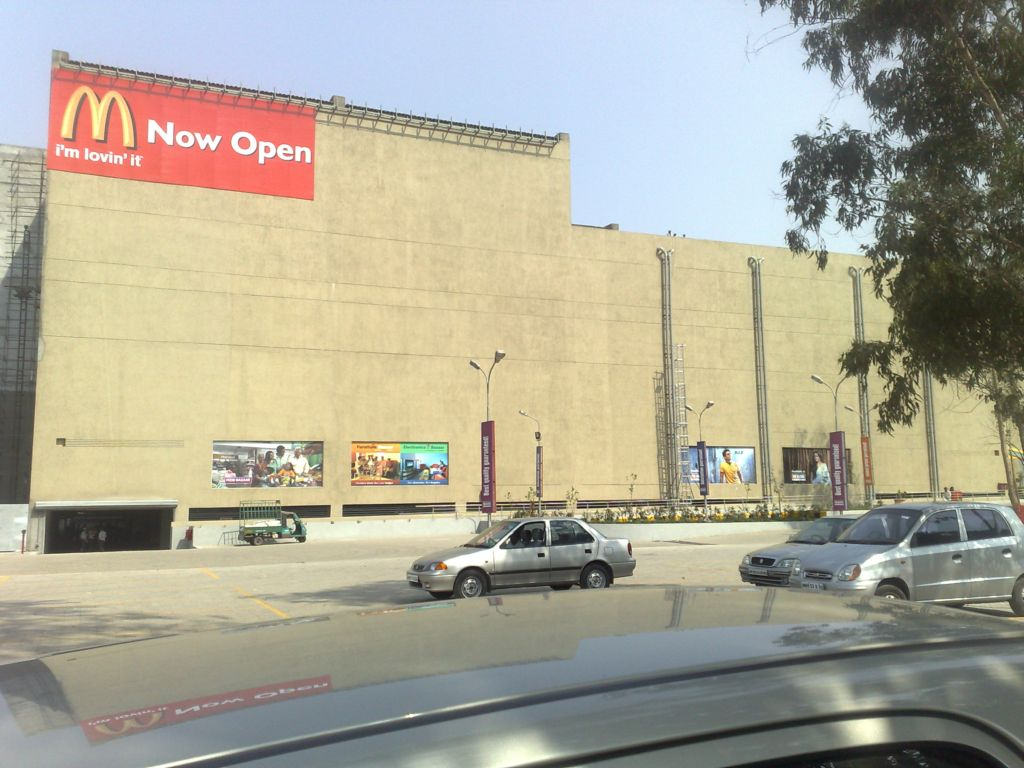
- Mall as seen from across the street
- Location: Kalyan, Thane district, India
- Address: Netivali, Kalyan Shil Road, Kalyan
- Opened: 2008
- Owner: West Pioneer Properties (India) Pvt. Ltd
- Floor area: 550,000 square feet (50,000 m^{2})
- Floors: 4
- Website: metrojunction.co

Metro Junction Mall is a shopping mall located in Kalyan, Thane district, India. It is the first mall in Kalyan. The mall was inaugurated in April 2008 and has an area of 550,000 square feet (50,000 m^{2}).

== Other details ==
The mall has multiple entry and exit points for better convenience to the customers. It also has parking space. A spacious area has been set up in the basement for parking. Shopping area is spread over 550,000 square feet (50,000 m^{2}). Over 10,000 square feet (900 m^{2}) is dedicated to Entertainment Zone.

The mall has a food court on top floor. The basement houses a clutter of fast food restaurants

== See also ==
- List of shopping malls in India
- List of shopping malls by country
- List of largest buildings in the world
