= Pradhan Commission =

Commission in Maharashtra, India

Pradhan Commission, officially known as the High-Level Enquiry Committee (HLEC) on 26/11, the Pradhan Commission was appointed by the Maharashtra Government on 30 December 2008, to probe the response to the 2008 Mumbai attacks.

This was a two-member commission comprising former home secretary R. D. Pradhan and former IPS officer Vappala Balachandran. The commission evaluated lapses in the law enforcement agencies and suggests measures to prevent events like 26/11 Mumbai attacks. On 21 December 2009 the commission report was presented to the then chief minister described the Mumbai attacks as "war-like" attack and also found that it was beyond the capacity of the Mumbai Police. The commission submitted its report to the Chief Minister of Maharashtra in April 2009, but the government did not release it, citing security concerns. In December 2009, after substantial portions of the report had been leaked in the media and much agitation had been conducted by the opposition in the state assembly, a Marathi translation was tabled before the assembly.

== Aims ==
The aim of the commission was to "analyse how far the existing procedures, instruments and administrative culture are to be blamed for what are perceived as lapses. Our stress is on identifying systemic failures," as opposed to blaming individuals.

== Findings ==
1. Intelligence - Relevant intelligence inputs were ignored or not acted upon seriously. Once surveillance was conducted and communications intercepted, it was already late.
2. Action to Handle the Attacks - The police force were incapable to tackle the attackers, who were well trained by the Pakistan Army and armed with assault rifles.
3. Means to Face Terrorist Attacks - The police personnel who were fighting the terrorists were equipped with antiquated World War II era weapons against modern arms that the NSG and terrorists had.
4. Command and Control - A lot of errors were committed by the top officers of Mumbai Police in terms of taking charge while dealing with the situation.
5. Coastal Security - The committee stated that Coastal Security was neglected despite patrolling by the Indian Navy, which allowed the terrorists to enter undetected.
6. Modernisation of Police - The committee recommended that the Police Force weapons be upgraded to modern standards, as well as new standards for training.
7. Anti-Terrorist Squad
8. Flying Squads
9. Handling of Security Intelligence at Operational Levels

== Members ==
1. R.D. Pradhan (chair), formerly Union Home Secretary in the Rajiv Gandhi government.
2. Vappala Balachandran, former special secretary, Cabinet Secretariat.
