= Cama Hospital =

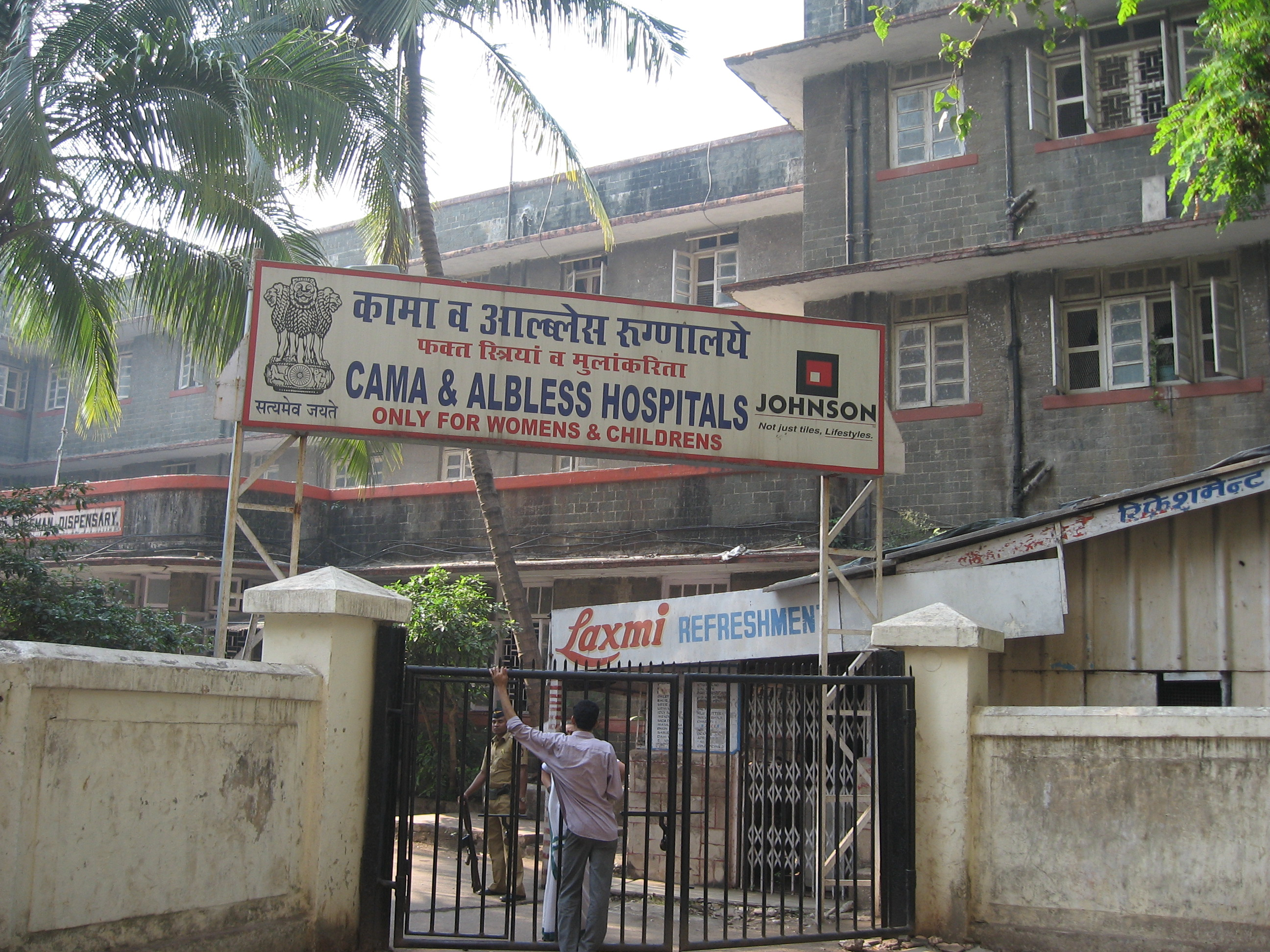
- Cama & Albless Hospital, back entrance in 2008

Geography
- Location: Mumbai, Maharashtra, India
- Coordinates: 18.942163°N 72.832079°E

Services
- Beds: 367

History
- Founded: 30 July 1886; 140 years ago

The Cama & Albless Hospital (originally just Cama Hospital) is a state-run hospital for women and children in the city of Mumbai, India, with 367 beds. Since May 2024, it has offered its Assisted reproductive technology (ART) services for free, making it the first public-run hospital in Maharashtra to do so. It is part of the Grant Medical College and Sir JJ Group of Hospitals, which includes four hospitals in South Mumbai, including Sir J.J. Hospital, St. George Hospital, Gokuldas Tejpal Hospital. It was one of the targets of the 2008 Mumbai attacks.

== History ==
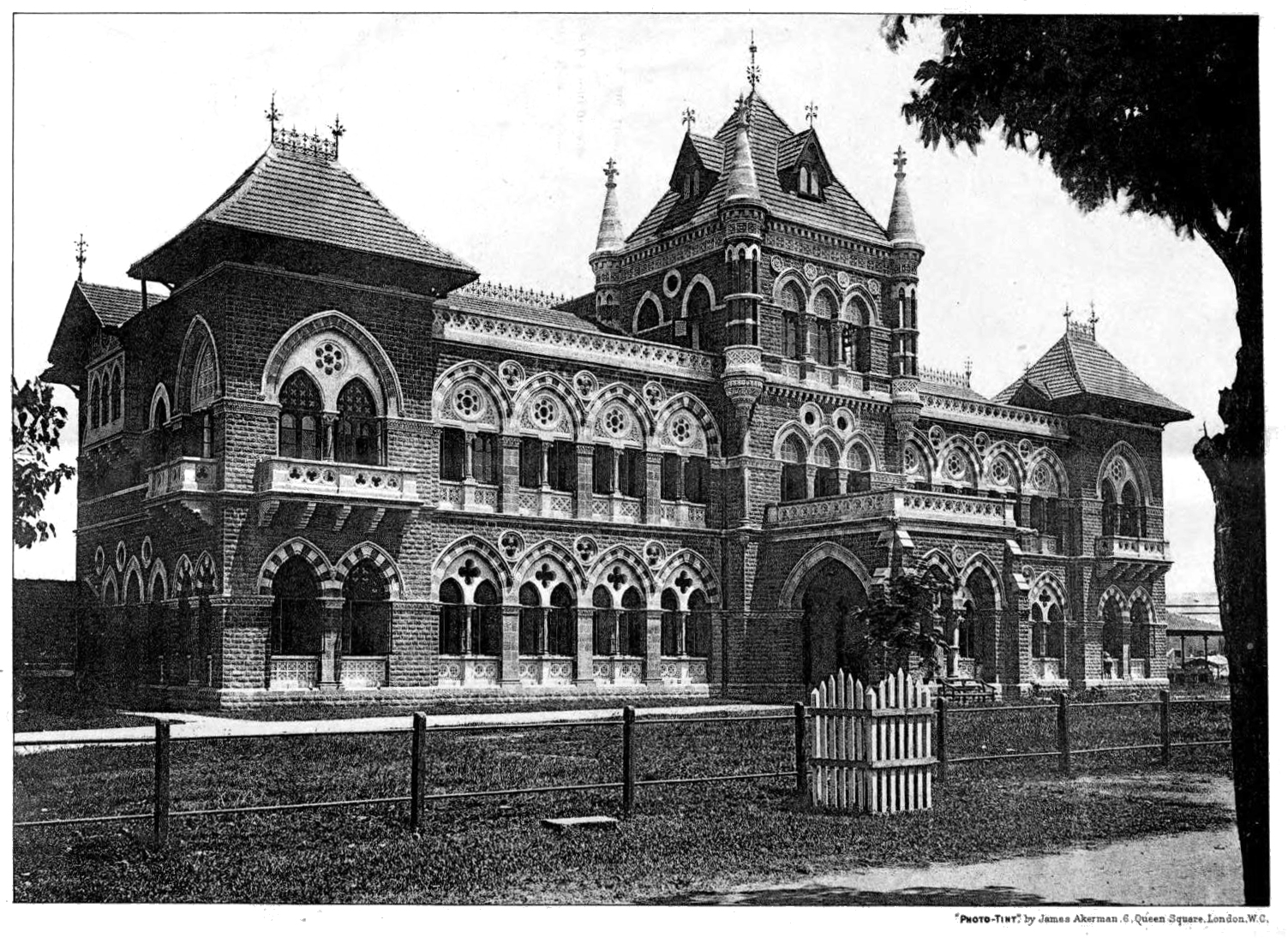
Cama Hospital in 1887

The foundation stone was laid by the Prince Arthur, Duke of Connaught and Strathearn on 22 November 1883 and the building formally opened on 30 July 1886. The building was designed in Medieval Gothic style by Khan Bahadoor Muncherjee Cowasjee Murzban. The building was made from stone obtained from Porbandar. Pestonjee Hormusjee Cama, a Parsi philanthropist, contributed ₹100,000 (~₹43 crore in 2020) to its construction. He later provided an additional ₹64,000 towards the cause. The staffing was provided through the Medical Women for India Fund.

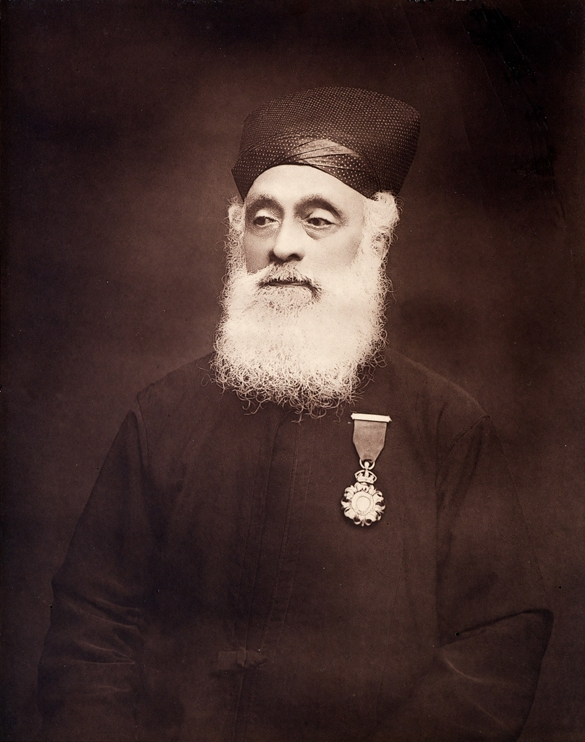
Pestonjee Hormusjee Cama, the founder of the Hospital.

At the start, all appointments for doctors were temporary and revised after five years. Edith Pechey, was the first female doctor to join the hospital. She was one of the original cohort of female medical students at the University of Edinburgh (1869). Pechey was the Senior Medical Officer at the hospital from 1886 to 1894. She was the driving force in the establishment of the nurses' training school attached to the hospital. Pechey along with her husband, founded the Pechey-Pimpson Sanatorium for women and children at Nasik Road in 1891.

Charlotte Louisa Elleby, an ophthalmologist with an MD degree from Paris, joined Pechey. Elleby started the eye department in the hospital as well as successfully handled the large number of outpatients for eye-related treatments.

Annette Benson was the head of the hospital for many years.

In 2023, it became the only government hospital in Maharashtra to have a department in Urogynecology, offering fellowships in the field. This was built with a donation from Taj Public Services Welfare Trust.

== 2008 terror attack ==
On the night of 26 November 2008, it was a target of a 2008 Mumbai attacks by Pakistan-based Lashkar-e-Taiba terrorists Ismail Khan and Ajmal Kasab, with the intent to kill patients, but their assault was unsuccessful as the hospital staff locked all of the patient wards. Around seven people were killed inside the Cama Hospital, while nine died outside, including several police officers, prominently Mumbai Anti-Terrorism Squad (ATS) chief Hemant Karkare, Senior Inspector Vijay Salaskar, and Additional Commissioner of Police Ashok Kamte, who died on the spot, while Assistant Commissioner Sadanand Date was injured. Khan was later killed at a shootout near Girgaon Chowpatty, while Kasab was captured and arrested.

During the subsequent investigation and trials, nurse Anjali Kulthe was called to the identification parade of Kasab and recognised him. Kulthe's testimony in court among other witnesses led to his conviction in May 2010 and death penalty was awarded to Kasab, who was executed on 21 November 2012. Kulthe also addressed at the UNSC Briefing: Global Counterterrorism Approach: Challenges and Way Forward via video link in December 2022 that Kasab showed no iota of remorse for his actions.

== In popular culture ==
In 2026, the Hindi film, Bharat Bhhagya Viddhaata was based on the terrorist attack on the hospital, and Kangana Ranaut played the role of Nurse Anjali Kulthe, who helped save 20 pregnant women during the attack.

== Services ==
=== ART ===
In May 2024 started offering free infertility treatment as part of its Assisted reproductive technology (ART) services. In November 2025 the hospital became the first public institution in Maharashtra to receive accreditation to expand its ART facilities to provide egg freezing and sperm bank services. These services were extended for free to those who were eligible under the Mahatma Jyotiba Phule Jan Arogya Yojana, the state's health insurance scheme.
