= St. George Hospital, Mumbai =

St George Hospital, Mumbai
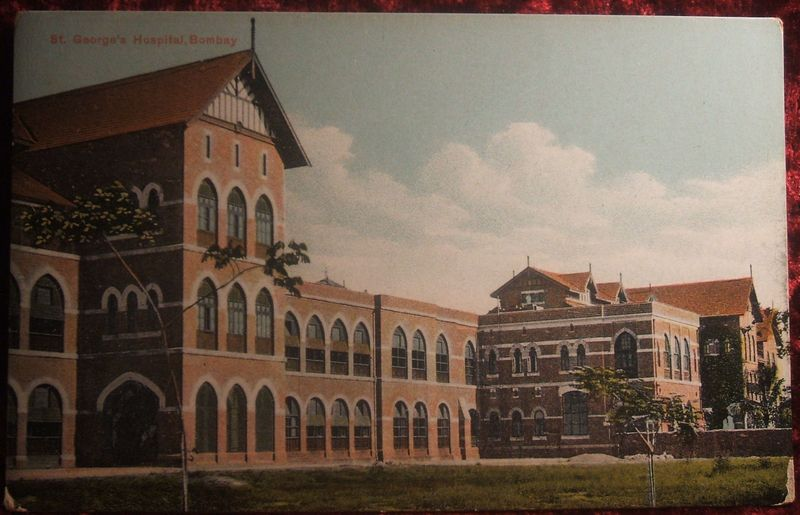
- St George Hospital Mumbai, circa 1900

- Shown in Mumbai, Maharashtra

Geography
- Location: Mumbai, Maharashtra, India
- Coordinates: 18.940385°N 72.837813°E

Links
- Website: www.stgh.in
- Lists: Hospitals in India

St. George Hospital, Mumbai is a multi-speciality hospital near the Chhatrapati Shivaji Maharaj Terminus (CSMT) in the Fort district in Mumbai, India. It is one of the oldest hospitals in Mumbai.

== History ==
St. George Hospital, Mumbai, was sanctioned in 1675 and established in 1677 as the European General Hospital, due to catering exclusively to European patients.The hospital was founded following the reforms of Gerald Aungier, the second Governor of Mumbai.

It opened to the public on December 20,1892.

Mumbai's first dedicated Urology Unit was established in St George's Hospital in the early 1960s under the late Dr B J Colabawalla, the founding Secretary of the Urological Society of India. Dr Tilak and Dr Gokarn later joined Dr Colabawala, and the Urology Unit grew to become the premier Urology referral centre in Mumbai, until similar units came up in King Edward Memorial Hospital, under Dr Karanjawala, and in Grant Medical College, under Dr. Rao and Dr. M H Kamat.

In 1984, the Asthma & Bronchitis Association of India was founded at St. George's pulmonary function laboratory.

== Organization ==
Currently, St. George Hospital operates under the administration of the Government of Maharashtra and is part of the Sir J.J. Group of Hospitals, which includes Grant Medical College, JJ Hospital, GT Hospital, and Cama and Albless Hospital. The hospital is under the administration of Sir J.J. dean Dr. Pallavi Saple. It has around 460 beds capacity.

== Speciality ==
St. George Hospital offers a wide range of medical specialties, including:

- General Medicine
- General Surgery
- Orthopaedics
- Obstetrics & Gynaecology
- Pediatrics
- E.N.T. (Ear, Nose, and Throat)
- Plastic Surgery
- Urology
- Ophthalmology
- Radiology
- Pathology
- Physiotherapy

== Awards and recognition ==
- Recognized for excellence in infectious disease management and critical care during the COVID-19 pandemic
