= Sadanand Date =

Indian police officer

Sadanand Vasant Date PMG IPS

Director General of Maharashtra Police
- Incumbent
- Assumed office 3 January 2026
- Preceded by: Rashmi Shukla

Director General of the National Investigation Agency
- In office 1 April 2024 – 2 January 2026
- Preceded by: Dinkar Gupta
- Succeeded by: Rakesh Aggarwal

Personal details
- Born: 14 December 1966 (age 59)
- Occupation: IPS officer

Sadanand Date PMG IPS (born 14 December 1966) is an officer of the 1990 batch Indian Police Service (IPS) belonging to Maharashtra cadre and currently serves as the Director General of Police DGP Maharashtra from 3 January 2026 onwards, whereas he has served as Director General of the National Investigation Agency from 1 April 2024 till 2 January 2026.

== Police career ==
Date has held several important posts at the state and national levels of the IPS, including serving as deputy inspector general of police in the CBI. He gained a doctorate from Savitribai Phule Pune University (in his home town), having previously done postgraduate work in commerce. Date is also a qualified cost and management accountant from Institute of Cost Accountants of India He attended the University of Minnesota under the Humphrey fellowship program, where he studied the theoretical and practical aspects of controlling white-collar and organized crime in the United States. On his return to India he was posted as additional commissioner of police (economic offences wing). He was awarded the President's medal in 2007. He previously held the post of Commissioner of police for Mira-Bhayandar and Vasai-Virar city near Mumbai. Later he held the position of Director General of the Anti Terrorism Squad of Maharashtra.

== Mumbai Attacks ==
Date was wounded and attracted international attention during the 2008 Mumbai attacks because of his actions resisting terrorists at the Cama and Albless Hospital for women and children. Date was awarded the President's Police Medal for Gallantry for saving lives of women and children at Cama Hospital on 26/11/2008.

== See also ==
- Gajendra Singh (NSG commando)
- Sandeep Unnikrishnan
- 2008 Mumbai attacks
