= 1988 Gilgit massacre =

Major instance of Shia-Sunni sectarian violence in Gilgit-Baltistan, Pakistan

1988 Gilgit Massacre
- Part of Sectarian violence in Pakistan
- Location of the Gilgit District in Gilgit-Baltistan
- Location: 35.8026°N 74.9832°E; Gilgit District, Gilgit-Baltistan, Pakistan
- Date: 16–18 May 1988; Pakistan Standard Time (UTC+5:00)
- Target: Shia Muslims
- Attack type: Immolation, mass shooting, lynching, arson, mass rape
- Deaths: 150–700
- Injuries: 100+
- Victim: Shia Muslims
- Perpetrators: Sipah-e-Sahaba; Sunni militants from Pakistan (Chilas, NWFP, FATA) and Afghanistan; Sunni Pakistani policemen
- Defenders: Sipah-e-Muhammad Pakistan; Tehreek-e-Jafaria Pakistan; Local armed Shia tribesmen
- Motive: Anti-Shi'ism

The 1988 Gilgit massacre was the mass killing of Shia civilians in the Gilgit District of Pakistan. The massacre was preceded by anti-Shia riots in early May 1988, which were caused by a dispute over the sighting of the moon for Eid al-Fitr after Ramadan between Shia Muslims and Sunni Muslims. Local Sunnis, who were still fasting for Ramadan, had attacked the local Shias who had announced their commencement of Eid celebrations in Gilgit City, leading to violent clashes between the two sects.

In response to the riots, the Pakistan Army under president Zia-ul-Haq led an armed group of local Sunni tribesmen from Chilas, accompanied by Osama bin Laden-led Sunni militants from Afghanistan as well as Pakistan's North-West Frontier Province (mostly from the Federally Administered Tribal Areas), accompanied by Sunni Pakistani policemen from the NWFP police, went into Gilgit and the adjoining areas in order to suppress the revolt. It is estimated that anywhere between 150 and 700 Shia Muslims were killed in the resulting massacre and violence, in which entire villages were also burnt down. The massacre also saw the mass rape of hundreds of Shia Muslim women by Sunni tribesmen and militants.

== Background ==
Shia Muslims living in the Pakistani-administered territory of Gilgit-Baltistan have allegedly faced discrimination by the Pakistani government since its takeover of the region following the First Kashmir War between India and Pakistan in 1947–1948. The Shias claimed that under Pakistani administration, Sunni Muslims enjoyed inherent advantages in all business matters, were unilaterally awarded official positions and treated preferentially in legal cases. On 5 July 1977, General Muhammad Zia-ul-Haq led a coup d'état in Pakistan, establishing a military dictatorship, and committed himself throughout his tenure to converting Pakistan into a heavily conservative Islamic state and enforcing sharia law. Zia's state-sponsored Islamization increased the sectarian divisions between Sunni and Shia Muslims, and even between Sunni Deobandis and Barelvis. The application of Sunni-centric laws throughout the country was divisive. Attacks on Shias (as well as other religious minorities) increased exponentially under the rule of Zia-ul-Haq. The country's first major Shia–Sunni riots erupted in 1983 in Karachi, Sindh during the Islamic holy month of Muharram (which is especially significant for the Shia), and left at least 60 people dead. Further Muharram disturbances and riots followed over the course of another three years, spreading to Lahore and the province of Balochistan—leaving hundreds more dead. In July 1986, Sunnis and Shias clashed in the northwest town of Parachinar, near the Afghanistan–Pakistan border; many of them were equipped with locally made automatic rifles. It is estimated that over 200 people died in this event of sectarian violence.

== Conflict ==
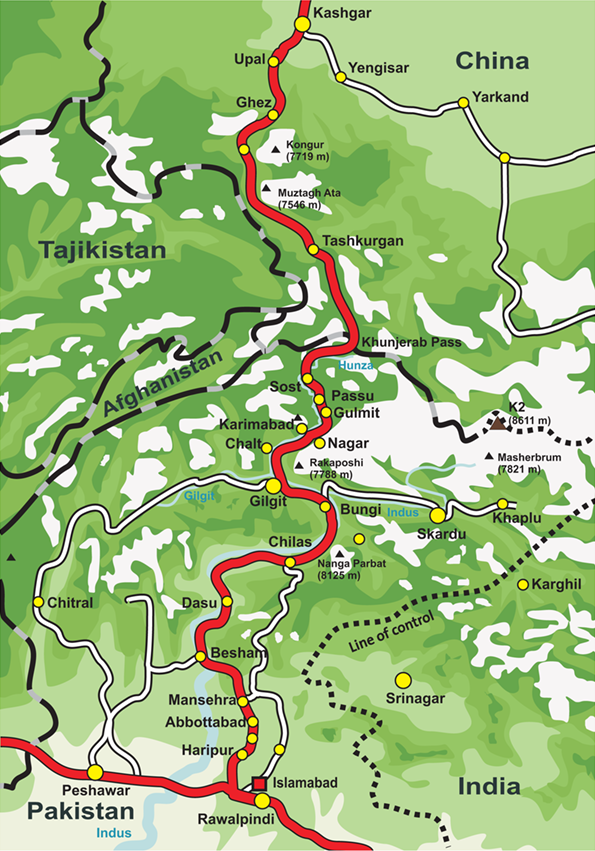
The Karakoram Highway was used to transport the assailants from Chilas and Indus Kohistan to Gilgit

The first major anti-Shia riots in Gilgit District broke out in May 1988, stemming from a Shia–Sunni dispute over the sighting of the moon, which marks the end of the Islamic holy month of Ramadan and the beginning of Eid al-Fitr. When Shia Muslims in Gilgit City commenced their festivities for Eid, a group of local Sunni Muslims—who were still fasting for Ramadan as their religious leaders had not yet declared the sighting of the moon—attacked them, sparking a series of violent clashes between Gilgiti Sunnis and Shias. Following a period of calm for about four days, the Zia-ul-Haq military regime reportedly sent a contingent of militants from the North-West Frontier Province and Federally Administered Tribal Areas of Pakistan, accompanied by additional militants from neighbouring Afghanistan and local Sunni tribesmen from Chilas to "teach (the Shias) a lesson", which resulted in the deaths of hundreds of people.

Shia Muslims in Gilgit District were attacked and killed by a hundreds-strong force of Sunni jihadists, led by Osama bin Laden and backed by the Pakistani military. Shia women living in Gilgit District were also mass-raped by local Sunni tribesmen and the Afghan jihadists.

The Herald, the former monthly magazine of the Dawn Media Group in Karachi, wrote in its April 1990 issue:

In May 1988, low-intensity political rivalry and sectarian tension ignited into full-scale carnage as thousands of armed tribesmen from outside Gilgit district invaded Gilgit along the Karakoram Highway. Nobody stopped them. They destroyed crops and houses, lynched and burnt people to death in the villages around Gilgit town. The number of dead and injured was in the hundreds. But numbers alone tell nothing of the savagery of the invading hordes and the chilling impact it has left on these peaceful valleys ... This led to violent clashes between the two sects. In 1988, after a brief calm of nearly four days, the military regime allegedly used certain militants along with local Sunnis to 'teach a lesson' to Shias, which led to hundreds of Shias and Sunnis being killed.

Adrian Levy and Catherine Scott-Clark in their 2010 book Deception: Pakistan, the United States, and the Secret Trade in Nuclear Weapons detail the involvement of Pakistan Army generals Mirza Aslam Beg and Pervez Musharraf and the Sunni militant group Sipah-e-Sahaba Pakistan:

Undaunted, Musharraf had in 1988 been called on by General Beg to put down a Shia riot in Gilgit, in the north of Pakistan. Rather than get the Pakistan army bloodied, he inducted a tribal band of Pashtun and Sunni irregulars, many from the SSP [Sipah-e-Sahaba Pakistan] which had recently put out a contract on Bhutto, led by the mercenary Osama bin Laden (who had been hired by Hamid Gul to do the same four years earlier)." ... Bin Laden’s militia mounted a savage pogrom, killing more than 300, and when the fighting had subsided Musharraf opened an office for SSP extremists in Gilgit, helping spread their influence across Pakistan.

== Casualties ==
The exact casualties figure of the 1988 Gilgit massacre has been disputed. Some sources state that 150 to 400 people were killed while hundreds of others were injured, while other unofficial reports state that around 700 Shias were killed.

== See also ==
- Sectarian violence in Pakistan
- Persecution of Kashmiri Shias
- Persecution of minority Muslim groups
- Sectarian violence among Muslims
- Freedom of religion in Pakistan
- Human rights in Pakistan
- Religious discrimination in Pakistan

== Bibliography ==
- Bansal, Alok (2007), "In Pursuit of Forced Assimilation: Sectarian and Ethnic Marginalisation in Gilgit-Baltistan", India Quarterly: A Journal of International Affairs, 63 (2): 56–80, doi:10.1177/097492840706300203, S2CID 153450836
- Levy, Adrian; Scott-Clark, Catherine (2010), Deception: Pakistan, the United States, and the Secret Trade in Nuclear Weapons, Bloomsbury Publishing, ISBN 978-0-8027-1860-0
- Singh, Priyanka (2013), Gilgit Baltistan: Between Hope and Despair, New Delhi: Institute for Defence Studies and Analyses, ISBN 978-93-82169-13-0
