= Young World =

Young World may refer to:

- Young World (magazine), a Pakistani children's magazine
- Young World (Lawrence Welk album), 1962
- Young World: The Future, a 2000 album by Lil' Zane
- "Young World" (song), a 1962 song by Rick Nelson
- "Young World", a song by Czarface and MF Doom from the album Super What?
- Mladý svět ('young world'), a weekly magazine published in the Czech Republic
- "Hey Young World", a song by Slick Rick from the album The Great Adventures of Slick Rick
