= 2008 Mumbai attacks =

Islamist terror attacks in India

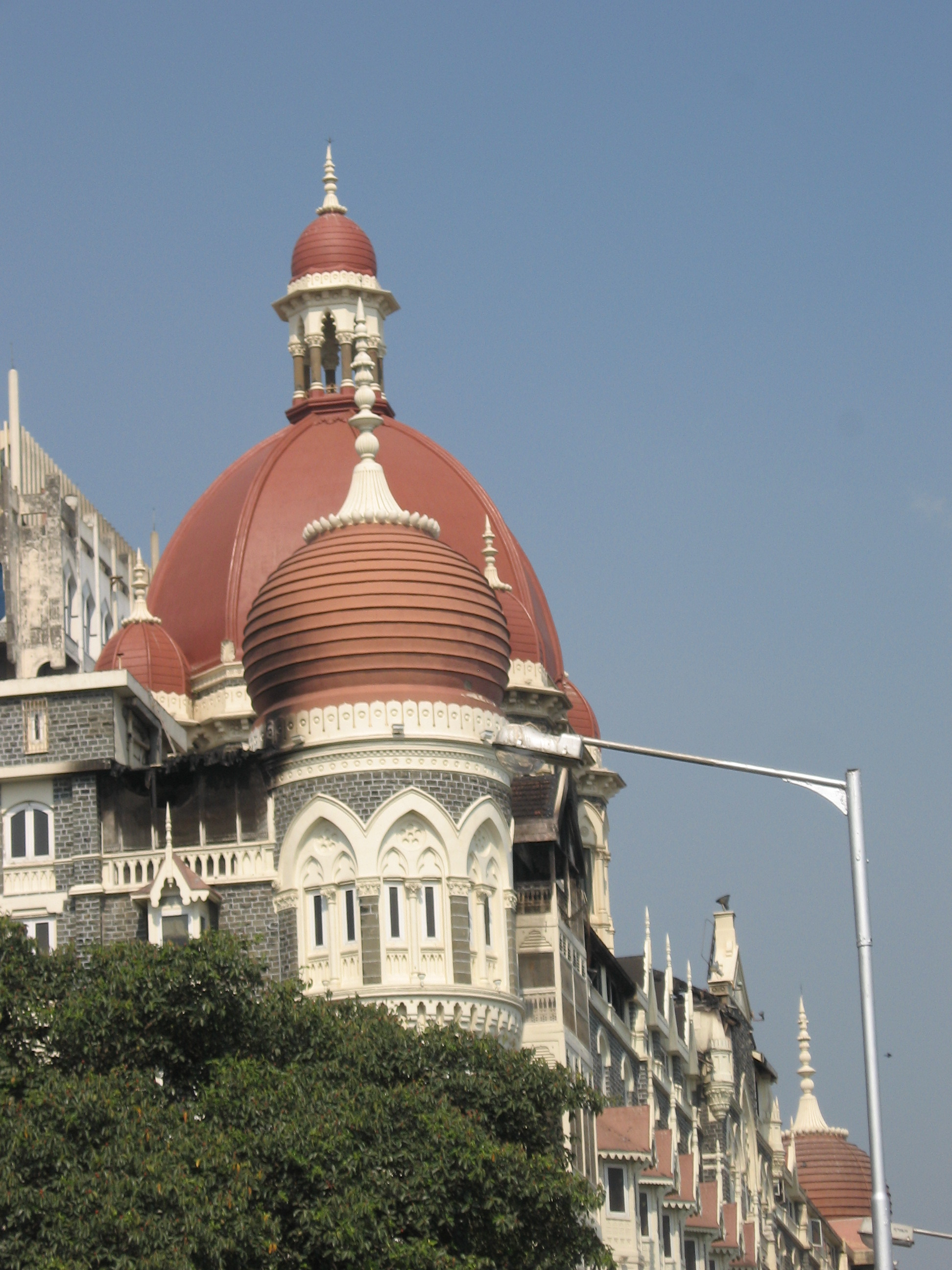
- The burned dome of the Taj Mahal Palace Hotel on 3 December 2008

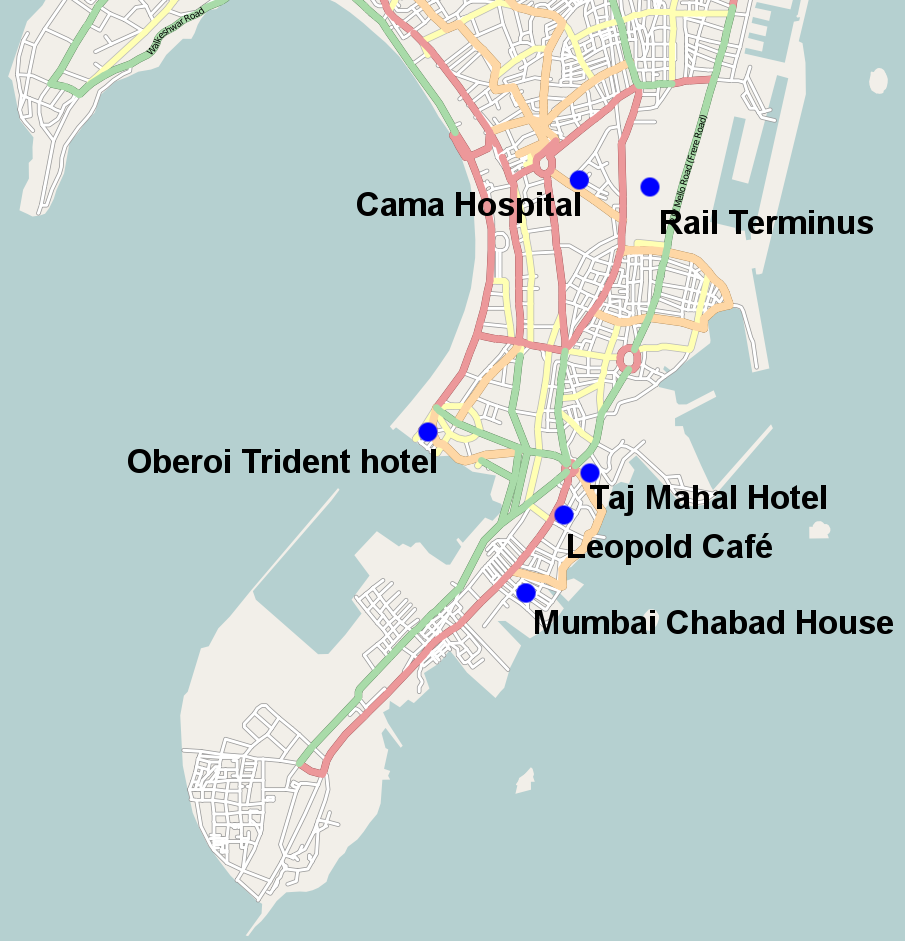
- Places of the attacks
- Location: 18°55′19″N 72°50′00″E; Mumbai, Maharashtra, India: Leopold Cafe; Chhatrapati Shivaji Terminus; Taj Mahal Palace Hotel; Trident Hotel, Nariman Point; Cama Hospital; Nariman House; Metro Big Cinemas; St. Xavier's College
- Date: 26 November 2008 – 29 November 2008; 21:30 (26/11) – 08:00 (29/11) (IST, UTC+05:30)
- Attack type: Bombings, mass shootings, mass murder, hostage crisis, siege
- Weapons: AK rifles, RDX, IEDs, grenades
- Deaths: 175 (166 people and 9 attackers)
- Injuries: 300+
- Victim: See casualty list for complete list
- Perpetrators: Lashkar-e-Taiba led by Zakiur Rehman Lakhvi and Hafiz Saeed
- No. of participants: 10
- Defenders: National Security Guard; MARCOS; Greater Mumbai Police; CRPF RAF; Railway Protection Force; Mumbai Fire Brigade
- Motive: Islamic terrorism

The 2008 Mumbai attacks, colloquially known as 26/11, were a coordinated series of twelve Islamic terrorist attacks carried out in Mumbai, Maharashtra, India, from 26 to 29 November 2008, by ten members of the Lashkar-e-Taiba. A total of 175 people died, including 166 civilians and nine of the attackers, and more than 300 people were injured.

The attackers arrived in Mumbai via the Arabian Sea. They had departed from Karachi on a Pakistani cargo vessel, hijacked an Indian fishing trawler on the way, and ended their journey to South Mumbai's coastline on inflatable boats. Eight of the attacks were mass shootings in South Mumbai at Chhatrapati Shivaji Terminus, Trident Hotel, Taj Mahal Palace Hotel, Leopold Cafe, Cama Hospital, Nariman House, Metro Big Cinemas, and in a lane behind St. Xavier's College and the headquarters of The Times of India. In addition to the mass shootings, an explosion occurred at Mazagaon, in Mumbai's port area, and in a taxi at Vile Parle. By the early morning of 28 November, all sites except for the Taj Hotel had been secured by the Mumbai Police and security forces. On 29 November, India's National Security Guards conducted Operation Black Tornado to flush out the remaining terrorists; it culminated in the death of the last remaining terrorists at the Taj Hotel and ended the attacks.

Before his execution in 2012, Ajmal Kasab, the sole surviving attacker captured by the Mumbai Police, confessed that the terrorists were members of the Lashkar-e-Taiba and were controlled from Pakistan, corroborating initial claims from the Indian government. Although initially denying the claims, Pakistan later confirmed that the sole surviving perpetrator of the attacks was a Pakistani citizen. The subsequent capture and interrogation of David Headley, a Pakistani-American DEA informer, and Tahawwur Rana, a Canadian citizen of Pakistani origin and a former Pakistan Army captain, who was Headley's partner, pointed to the involvement of rogue officials from Pakistan's army and its Inter-Services Intelligence agency, who provided support to Lashkar-e-Taiba for the attacks. The capture of Zabiuddin Ansari aka Abu Hamza in July 2012, an Indian national radicalised by Lashkar-e-Taiba, provided further clarity to the plot.

On 9 April 2015, the foremost suspected ringleader of the attacks, Zakiur Rehman Lakhvi, was released on bail in Pakistan and disappeared. He evaded capture for years, until being arrested again in Lahore on 2 January 2021. In 2018, former Pakistani prime minister Nawaz Sharif questioned the Pakistani government's allowing men who had committed the attacks to cross into India. In 2022, one of the masterminds of the attack, Sajid Mir — who the Pakistani government had earlier said was dead — was convicted for funding terrorist activities by an anti-terrorism court in Pakistan and sentenced to 15 years in prison. Consequently, several masterminds such as Lashkar-e-Taiba founder Hafiz Saeed and Zakiur Rehman Lakhvi were convicted for terror financing in 2021–22, as Pakistan went into an economic crisis after the Financial Action Task Force (FATF) threatened the government of Pakistan to be put in the FATF Blacklist for failure to comply on money laundering and financing of terrorism.

Known as one of the deadliest terrorist attacks in Mumbai and across India, the 2008 attacks caused property damage worth US$18.5 million through fire, grenade attacks, and gunfire; although the human casualties were lower than in the 2006 Mumbai train bombings, the attacks had a significant impact on the city's infrastructure and security measures. Economic losses arose from insurance claims and business disruption. The attacks strained diplomatic relations between India and Pakistan, and made a huge impact on law enforcement and security officials to deal with such scenarios in the future. The attacks also caused a major political impact on the then ruling government led by the United Progressive Alliance, as the same year, several other cities suffered from Islamic terrorism, which were also perpetrated by Pakistani terror groups.

== Background ==
Many terrorist attacks had occurred in Mumbai since the 13 coordinated bomb explosions that killed 257 people on 12 March 1993. The 1993 attacks were carried out as revenge for the earlier Bombay riots, in which many Muslims were killed. Between March 1993 and July 2006 Mumbai city saw 12 notable incidents of bomb attacks resulting in the death of 516 people and injuries to 1952. Whereas all of these were bomb attacks, the November 2008 Mumbai attacks were fidayeen or suicide attacks.

On 6 December 2002, a blast in a BEST bus near Ghatkopar station killed two people and injured 28. The bombing occurred on the 10th anniversary of the demolition of the Babri Mosque in Ayodhya. A bicycle bomb exploded near the Vile Parle station in Mumbai, killing one person and injuring 25 on 27 January 2003, a day before the visit of the Prime Minister of India Atal Bihari Vajpayee to the city. On 13 March 2003, a day after the 10th anniversary of the 1993 Bombay bombings, a bomb exploded in a train compartment near the Mulund station, killing 10 people and injuring 70. On 28 July 2003, a blast in a BEST bus in Ghatkopar killed 4 people and injured 32. On 25 August 2003, two bombs exploded in South Mumbai, one near the Gateway of India and the other at Zaveri Bazaar in Kalbadevi. At least 44 people were killed and 150 injured. On 11 July 2006, seven bombs exploded within 11 minutes on the Suburban Railway in Mumbai, killing 209 people, including 22 foreigners and more than 700 injured. According to the Mumbai Police, the bombings were carried out by Lashkar-e-Taiba (LeT) and Students Islamic Movement of India (SIMI).

== Training ==
A group of men numbering about 25 to 40 went through an extensive multi-stage training programme at different locations in Pakistan:

- Psychological: Indoctrination to Islamist jihadi ideas, including imagery of atrocities suffered by Muslims in India and globally. Kasab went through the three week Daura Sufa course at the headquarters of Lashkar-e-Taiba, called Markaz-e-Taiba, in Muridke, between 29 December 2007 and 18 January 2008. Apart from Islamic studies, physical training was given priority. During Kasab's stay at Muridke, he had the opportunity to hear Hafiz Saeed in person. Swimming was encouraged, and those who already knew how to swim were taken for advanced training at the lake in the campus.
- Basic combat: Lashkar's basic combat training and methodology course, the Daura Aam. Beginning on 25 January 2008, Kasab went through the Daura Ama course which lasted for 21 days and took place in one of Lashkar's terrorist training camps located in Buttal (Kahori). Weapons introduced included the SKS and the AK-47.
- Advanced training: Selected to undergo advanced combat training at a Lashkar camp near Mansehra, a course the organisation calls the Daura Khaas. According to an unnamed source at the U.S. Defense Department, this includes advanced weapons and explosives training supervised by former members of the Pakistan Army, along with survival training and further indoctrination. Kasab went through Daura Khaas during May to July 2008. His batch consisted of 32 participants.
- Commando training: Finally, an even smaller group was selected for specialised commando tactics training, and marine navigation training was given to the Fedayeen unit that was selected, to target Mumbai. Kasab received marine training in Thatta district in Sindh; his batch consisted of 15 participants.
- Another course, the Daura Ribat, focused on intelligence gathering and communication techniques. During 2002 to 2003 David Headley completed all these courses.
- The final team of 10 were introduced to Mumbai and the targets through lectures, audio visual aids, hand drawn maps and Google Earth.

They received training in marine warfare at a remote camp in mountainous Muzaffarabad in Pakistan. Part of the training was said to have taken place on the Mangla Dam reservoir in Pakistan.

According to a media report citing an unnamed former Department of Defense official of the US, the intelligence agencies of the US had determined that former officers from Pakistan's Army and Inter-Services Intelligence agency assisted actively and continuously in training.

== Attacks ==
One of the inflatable boats

After setting sail from Karachi, the terrorists hijacked an Indian fishing boat and killed four people on board. The boat's captain was kept alive for navigation; he was later killed. The first events ashore were detailed around 20:30 Indian Standard Time (IST) on 26 November, when 10 men in inflatable speedboats (counts vary) (Note: The number of inflatable boats vary from 1-3 according to source.) landed at two locations in Colaba. They reportedly told locals and fishermen (counts vary) who asked them who they were that they were students and to "mind their own business". (Note: Accounts at this stage vary regarding whether the police were informed or not about these men and whether the tip was ignored.) The terrorists further split up into groups of two with each going their separate way either on foot or via taxi. (Note: The number of pairs taking taxis varies from 2 to 3 depending on the source.)

=== Chhatrapati Shivaji Maharaj Terminus ===
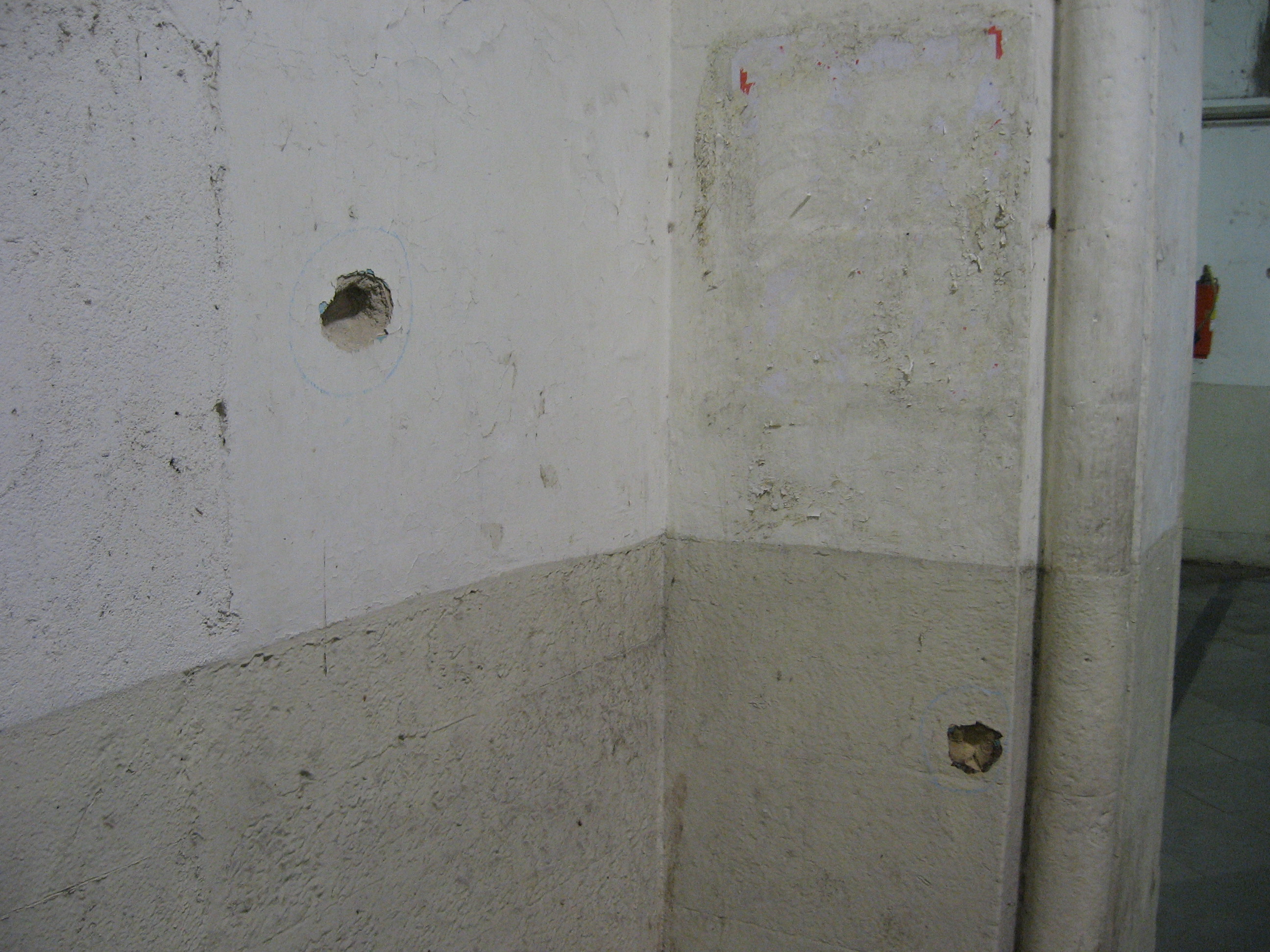
Bullet holes on the wall at the CSMT

The Chhatrapati Shivaji Maharaj Terminus (CSMT) was attacked by two gunmen including Ajmal Kasab. The attack began around 21:30, when the two entered the passenger hall and opened fire with AK-47 assault rifles and grenades. Onsite security personnel were heavily outgunned. Three were killed confronting the terrorists. Announcements by a railway announcer, Vishnu Dattaram Zende, alerted passengers to leave the station, which saved many lives. The attackers killed 58 people and injured 104 others, their assault ending at about 22:45. (Note: Accounts of the duration of the attack vary from about one hour to ninety minutes.) While moving away from the railway station, the attackers passed a police station. Knowing that they were outgunned, the officers at the station switched off the lights and secured the gates rather than confronting the terrorists.

The attackers then headed toward Cama Hospital. Alerted by the sound of gunfire, the hospital staff locked the patient wards, switched off the lights and silenced mobile phones. Two hospital watchmen were killed. The terrorists moved through the hospital for around 50 minutes. A police team reached the hospital and a shootout took place on the sixth floor. Two police officers were killed and five injured, including Sadanand Date, after which the terrorists left the hospital complex.

A team of the Mumbai Anti-Terrorist Squad, led by Police Chief Hemant Karkare, searched CSMT and then left in pursuit of the two terrorists after receiving a wireless message that Date and his team have been injured in a firefight. The terrorists opened fire on the police vehicle in a lane next to the hospital and received return fire. Karkare, Vijay Salaskar, Ashok Kamte, and three of their constables were killed. The only survivor, Constable Arun Jadhav, was severely wounded and pretended to be dead. The terrorists seized the police vehicle but later abandoned it and seized a passenger car instead. They then ran into a police roadblock, which had been set up after Jadhav radioed for help. A gun battle ensued in which the terrorist with Kasab was killed. A police officer, Tukaram Omble, was killed when he tried to disarm Kasab by wrestling his weapon away from him. After a physical struggle with other police personnel, Kasab was arrested. It was now around 01:00 on the 27th. Kasab was immediately taken to a government hospital where he was also interrogated. Actionable intelligence was being passed on. At around 05:30 he was brought to Rakesh Maria at the police control room for further questioning. Among other things, Kasab stated that there were just ten of them, and that they were supposed to die fighting. During this time, attacks went on at other locations including the two five star hotels, Taj and Oberoi Trident.

=== Leopold Cafe ===
The Leopold Cafe, a popular restaurant and bar on Colaba Causeway in South Mumbai, was one of the first sites to be attacked on 26 November. Accounts vary with regard to when exactly the attack on Leopold Cafe took place and its duration. (Note: Accounts vary between whether the terrorists enter the building or not.) They place the start of the attack between 21:15 and 21:40, while the duration of the attack varies between just over two minutes and 45 minutes. The two attackers killed 10 people, including some international visitors, and injured many more. The attackers then headed for Taj Mahal Palace Hotel a short distance away. On the way 13 bystanders were killed.

The nearest police station was 200 meters away. Sounds from the attack on the cafe reached the police station. Screaming pedestrians ran past the station. The duty inspector logged the time of the incident as 21:45. The attackers had moved on by the time police arrive at the cafe. Sounds of gunfire could still be heard, now some distance away. Within minutes there were around two dozen police personnel at the cafe. Following messages over walkie-talkie, police personnel headed in the direction of the gunshots and Taj Hotel.

=== Bomb blasts ===
Two pairs of terrorists hailed taxis to go to their target. During these journeys they left time bombs in the vehicles. These time bombs successfully exploded. The first explosion took place at Wadi Bunder between 22:20 and 22:25. Three people, including the driver of the taxi, were killed, and about 15 others were injured. The second one occurred at 22:40 at Vile Parle, killing the driver and a passenger. A total of 10 bombs were planted during the entire course of events. Two bombs were defused. In addition, police seized a boat filled with arms and explosives anchored at Mazgaon dock off Mumbai Harbour.

=== Taj Mahal Palace Hotel ===
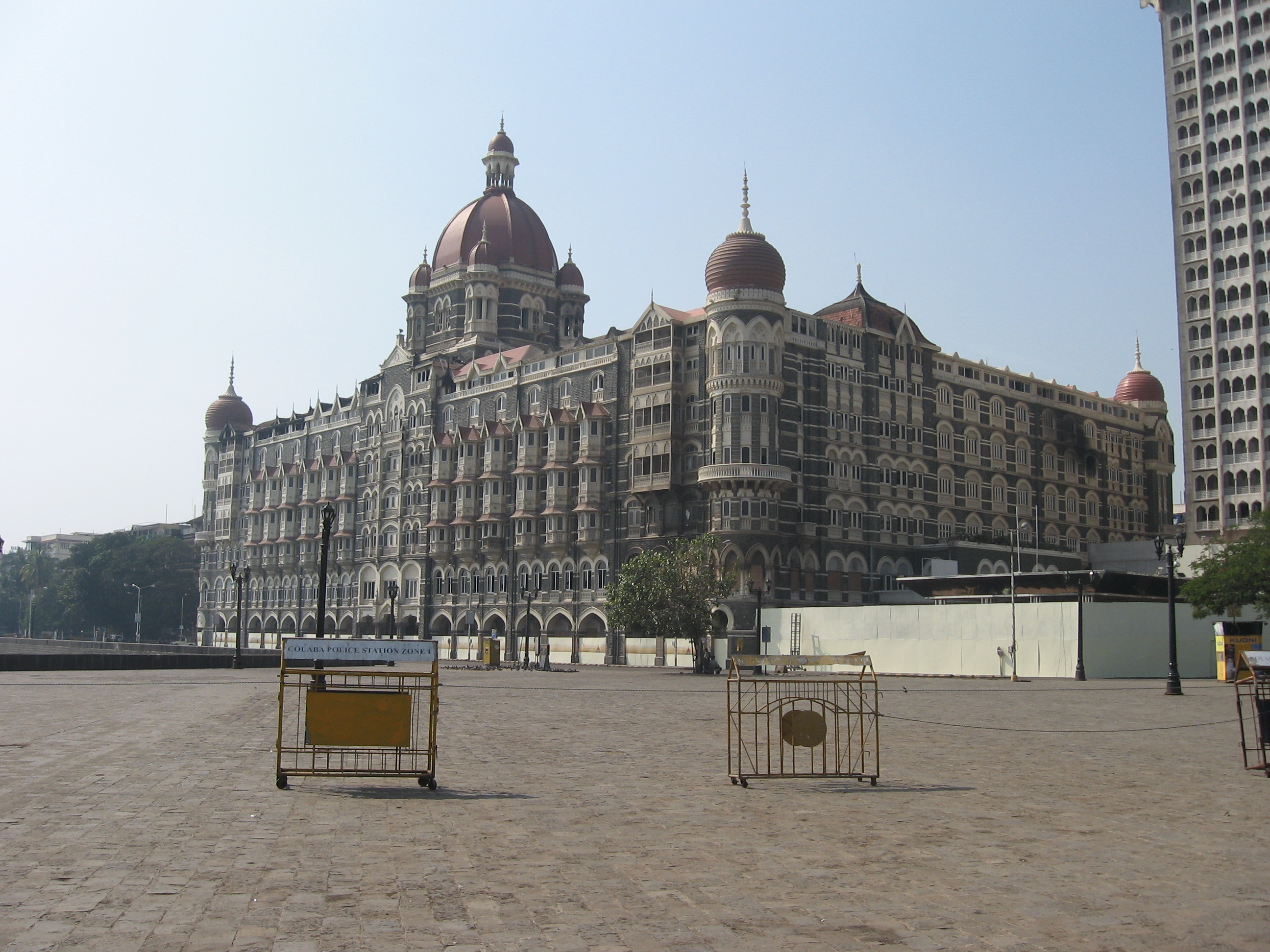
Taj Hotel, with the Tower on the right, barricaded days after the attack

The 565 room five-star Taj hotel consists of two main buildings, the six-story Palace and the 20-story Tower. Additionally, there are a large number of non-residential rooms including restaurants, kitchens and stores. When the terrorists entered the Taj, more than 500 staff and 1200 guests and diners were present. CCTV recordings showed two terrorists entering the hotel at 21:44. (Note: Different reports place the time between 21:25 and 22:30.) At 21:54 hours firing at the Taj was reported at the police control room. Ten minutes later they were joined by the two terrorists who had attacked the Leopold Café. After shooting anything that moved in the lobby, the terrorists moved to upper floors.

For the first two hours, apart from the unarmed hotel security, only six policemen were present in the hotel. Vishwas Nangare Patil, a deputy commissioner of police (DCP) along with the hotel's security chief were among the first to make contact with the terrorists. DCP Nangre-Patil fired his Glock at two of the terrorists and missed. The terrorists returned gunfire. Nangre-Patil realised he was outgunned and focused on evacuation of guests on the ground floor while the terrorists moved to other floors. Hundreds of guests hiding in ground floor shops and restaurants were evacuated. Other hotel staff, including chefs and waiters, did what they could to assist the guests, including guiding them to supposedly safer areas of the hotel. Guests were either in their rooms or in areas such as the hotel's private invitation only club, where 250 people were crowded. Elsewhere there was a Korean delegation of a hundred, the board of Hindustan Unilever, and a wedding reception. Among the guests were the wife of the Taj Group's CEO, South African commandos and a US Marine captain. All the while, the terrorists were being guided and motivated by handlers. In real time, the technical section of the Mumbai Police ATS was listening in to these conversations and passing on actionable intel. The hotel's sniffer dog team had been killed. During this firing a ricochetting bullet hit the leg of one of the terrorists. During another gunfight, two State Reserve Police Force personnel were hit by shrapnel. Between them, the terrorists had forty kilograms of RDX, which was used by them to create a number of explosions. In one instance the terrorists planted a bomb on the fifth floor below the central dome. Its explosion caused structural damages.

Then commissioner of police Hasan Gafoor ordered police personnel to take no action inside the hotel and to wait for the NSG to arrive. Now in the hotel's CCTV room, the DCP, other police personnel, and hotel security observed the terrorists moving on the fifth and sixth floors. The handlers reminded the terrorists to shoot the CCTV cameras. Chaitlall Gunness, CEO of the State Bank of Mauritius, was killed at the entrance of room 551 at around 22:30 when he answered the doorbell. Three hours into the attack the terrorists were still moving about freely on the upper floors. They had shifted five hostages to a single room. However, the handlers told them to keep moving and split the hostages into two groups.

Indian Navy special operations force MARCOS had been mobilized from a nearby base. Even though they were already in the hotel before the NSG, they were considered the wrong force for the job. From a total strength of 1000, 8 marine commandos arrived at 2 a.m. and another 16 at around 5 a.m. The terrorists would also go on to light enough fires so as to make it on to the news, which the handlers confirmed. Huge plumes of smoke also caused the death of some guests. Fire fighters doused the flames and helped evacuate guests from windows. 200 guests and staff were rescued from windows using ladders during the first night. By 27th, 8 a.m., one flight with NSG commandos had arrived in Mumbai. These 120 commandos were split between the three locations Trident, Taj, and Chabad House. The Taj task force consisted of weapons experts, explosive experts, medics and a communications team.

NSG started clearing the Tower starting from the top. Two other teams would start with the Palace. While the Tower was given the clear, a team in the Palace made contact with the terrorists. The team had spotted several figures going into a room on the fourth floor. The door was blasted only to find that a mattress had been placed against it, absorbing the blast. As they attempted to enter an attacker came out with a guest in front of them. The terrorists flung a grenade causing injuries to three commandos and the NSG team withdrew. By 16:00 on the 28th, three flights with NSG commandos had reached Mumbai. Over a hundred commandos were in the Taj. On the 29th at 4 a.m., explosive experts began creating two bombs. Some of the material needed for these was bought by Mumbai Police from local shops; they were back in an hour, and soon two bombs were built. The explosion created by these two bombs resulted in the death of the four terrorists. Mop-up operations took another eight hours.

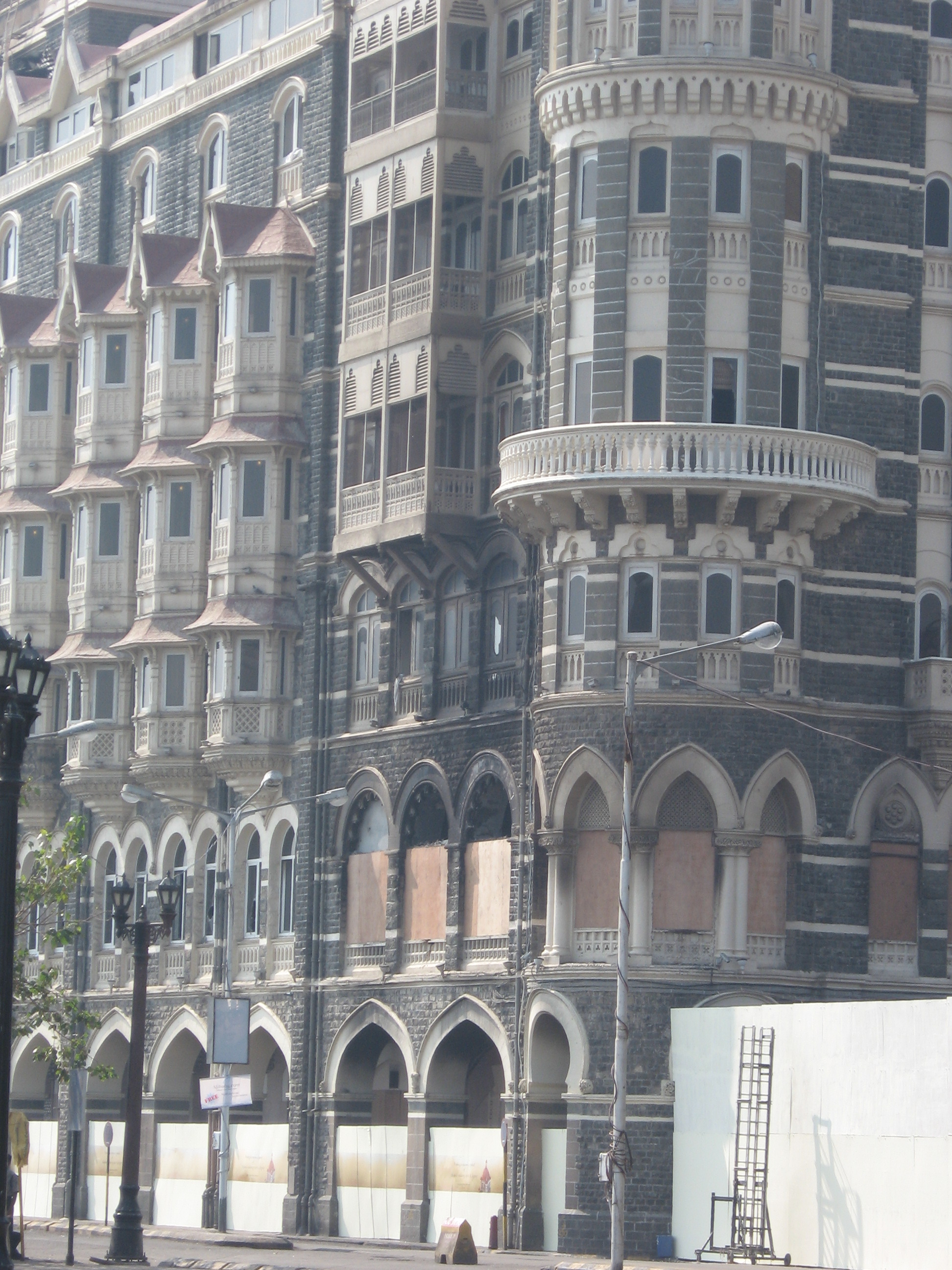
The first floor of the Taj Hotel was completely gutted.

CNN initially reported on the morning of 27 November 2008 that the hostage situation at the Taj Hotel had been resolved and quoted the police chief of Maharashtra, stating that all hostages were freed; however, later news reports indicated that attackers were still in the Taj, with explosions heard and gunfire exchanged.

Several members of the European Parliament Committee on International Trade were staying at the Taj Hotel when it was attacked, but none were harmed. British Conservative Member of the European Parliament (MEP) Sajjad Karim (who was in the lobby when attackers initially opened fire there) and German Social Democrat MEP Erika Mann were hiding in different parts of the building. Also reported present was Spanish MEP Ignasi Guardans, who was barricaded in a hotel room. Another British Conservative MEP, Syed Kamall, reported that he along with several other MEPs left the hotel and went to a nearby restaurant shortly before the attack. Kamall also reported that Polish MEP Jan Masiel was thought to have been sleeping in his hotel room when the attacks started, but eventually left the hotel safely. Kamall and Guardans reported that a Hungarian MEP's assistant was shot. Also caught up in the shooting were Indian MP N. N. Krishnadas of Kerala and Gulam Noon while having dinner at a restaurant in the Taj Hotel. Gautam Adani, a billionaire business tycoon of India, was having dinner in the Taj on November 26; he hid in the hotel kitchen and later in the toilet, and came out safely the next morning.

A total of 36 civilians were killed inside Taj Hotel. Major Sandeep Unnikrishnan of the NSG was fatally shot during the rescue of Commando Sunil Yadav, who was hit in the leg by a bullet during the rescue operations at Taj. During the siege the owner of the hotel, Ratan Tata, had arrived and hotel staff had set up headquarters in a nearby hotel for those escaping the siege. The last attacker was killed at 8 AM on the 29 November 2008 by the NSG.

=== Oberoi and Trident Hotel ===
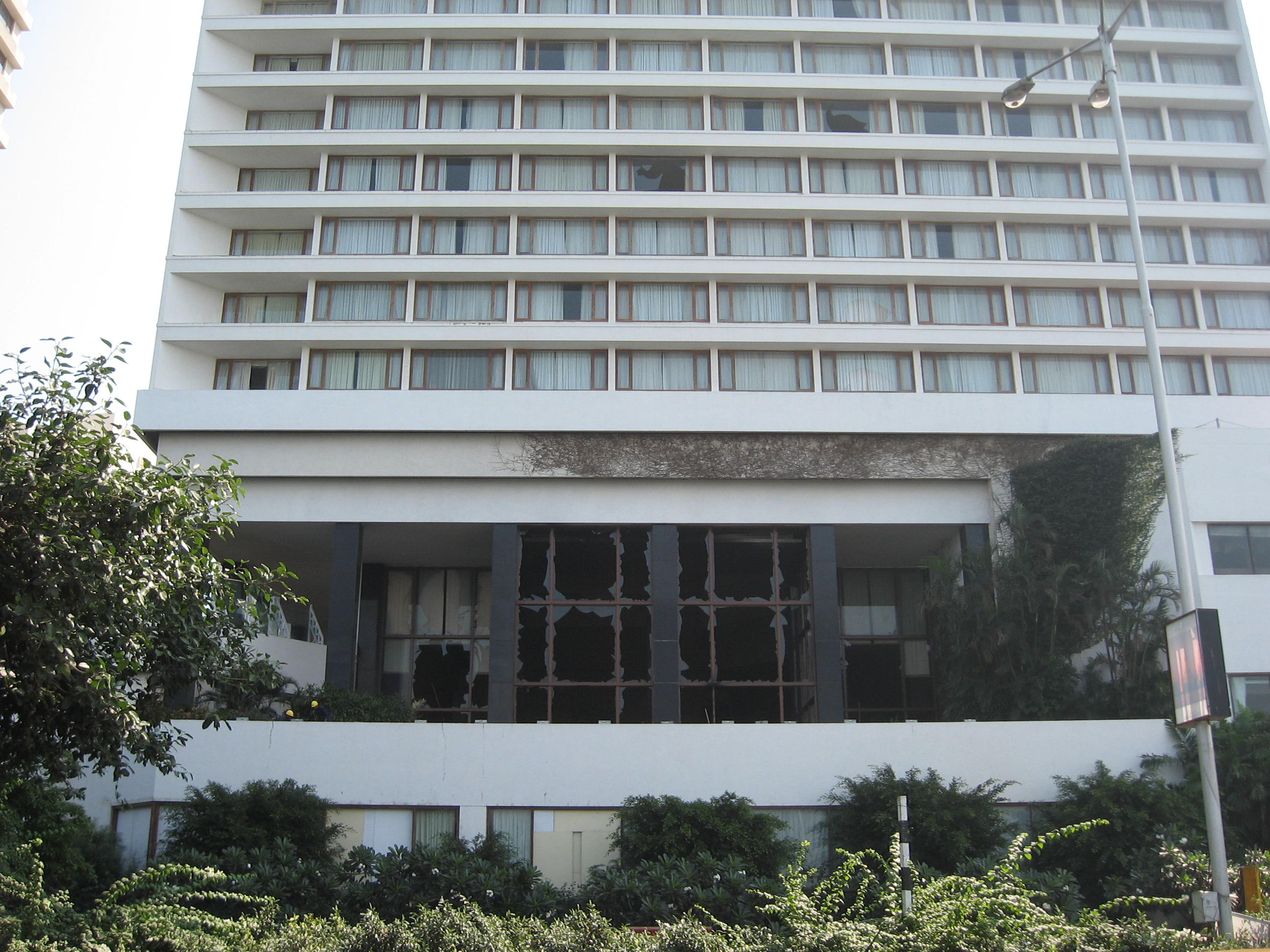
The damaged Oberoi Trident hotel

The Oberoi and Trident hotels are a luxury hotel complex having over 800 rooms. The attack started on 26 November between 21:35 and 22:20. Before entering the hotel, a pair of terrorists placed an IED at the entrance of the hotel. This IED exploded at 22:15. After firing at guests in the lobby and in one of the restaurants they placed another IED there as well. This IED exploded at 22:30. The attackers then moved upwards through the 33 floor Trident Hotel taking hostages as they progressed. The modus operandi followed was similar to the attack taking place at the Taj.

The first call to the police was at 21:51. Within minutes police personnel reached the hotel. An outer cordon was established and some civilians were rescued. While at this stage there was a confrontation between the terrorists and the police, the outgunned police backed away. Eight marine commandos arrived at around 02:00 on the 27th and engaged the terrorists however heavy gunfire and grenades limited their progress. NSG commandos reached the hotel at 07:00 on the 27th. At 11:00 they began operations. Rooms were entered using a master key and searched one by one. (Note: Accounts vary between whether the security forces took a bottom-to-top or top-to-bottom approach.) They came across the attackers on reaching the 18th floor of the hotel at 17:30. Operations continued into the 28th when the attackers were killed at around 15:00. Four commandos were injured, out of which two were seriously injured.

During the attack one of the terrorists called up an Indian news channel and the subsequent conversation was aired nationally. When reports emerged that attackers were receiving television broadcasts, feeds to the hotels were blocked. President of Madrid, Esperanza Aguirre and her accompanying trade delegation were in the hotel premises during the attack. 32 hostages were killed at the Oberoi Trident. 250 people were rescued.

The last terrorist was killed by NSG on 28 November at around 3 PM.

=== Nariman House ===
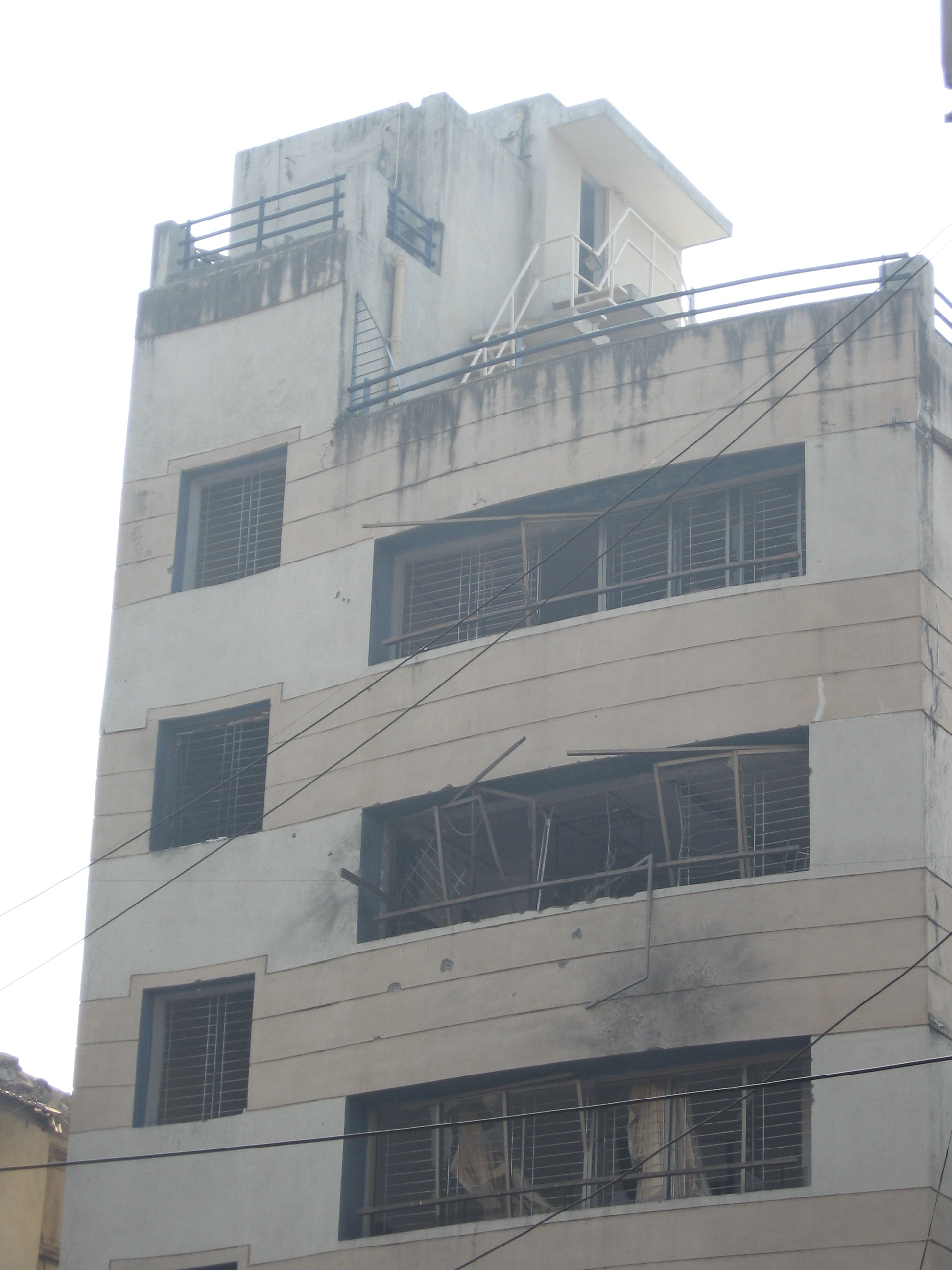
Front view of the five-story Nariman House a week after the attacks

Nariman House, a Chabad Lubavitch Jewish centre in Colaba known as the Mumbai Chabad House, run by Gavriel Holtzberg and his wife, was taken over by two attackers on the 26th at around 21:20, and several visiting residents were held hostage. Police were notified of gunfire in the area around one hour later. At least 300 locals from adjacent buildings were evacuated and gunfire was exchanged with the attackers. At around midnight on the 27th, 9 hostages were rescued from the first floor.

NSG officers did a recce at 15:00 on the 27th. Attempts were made to ascertain the layout of the interiors of Nariman House. On the 27th in the morning the Holtzbergs' two-year-old son had managed to escape with his caregiver. A cook had also managed to escape. The three had been taken to a nearby police station. The NSG weren't aware of this. By 18:00 NSG had set up an inner cordon and placed its snipers. It was getting dark and the NSG had no night vision equipment. However at 21:30 electricity to the building was cut and a probe team attempted entry. A grenade was thrown from inside causing the NSG probe team to withdraw.

At around 22:00 Indian intelligence intercepted a call between the terrorists at Nariman and their handlers regarding killing the hostages. NSG was informed about the death of the hostages only after a delay. The mission had now changed from hostage rescue to seek and destroy. During this time more than 60 civilians were shifted from surrounding buildings. It was now 01:00 on the 28th when the civilian evacuation was considered complete. The NSG realised that the police may have initially made an overestimate with regard to the number of terrorists. The terrorists continued firing single shots throughout the night, changing positions as they did so.

NSG Commandos beginning the assault on Nariman House by fast-roping onto the terrace

It was decided to enter the building at dawn from the roof. Commandos were positioned on an adjacent building with a commanding view of the drop off point. There were two 84mm Carl Gustav rocket launchers incase the terrorists attacked the helicopter. Three AK47s were borrowed from Mumbai Police for these commandos. The gloves for fast-roping could not be found so makeshift gloves had to be made. At 07:05 the helicopter arrived with 20 commandos with MP5s. Hundreds of locals and television crews crowded to view the spectacle. Live telecast of the helicopter and the commandos helped the handlers provide information to the terrorists. The terrorists prepared themselves on the fourth floor of the five story building by shifting around objects to make makeshift pillbox shaped structures.

The commandos clear the fifth floor, still making sure there were no civilians. The door to the fourth floor was closed which was breached using an explosive charge. The first commando to enter, Gajender Singh Bisht, was shot by a terrorist, and brief gunfire was exchanged. A grenade thrown by the terrorists injured two commandos. Retrieving the body of Bisht became a priority. To this end the officer incharge ordered all surrounding units to fire; tear gas canisters are also thrown in. During this firing one of the terrorists was injured. Intercepted communication between the terrorist and his handler also conveys the same.

A new entry to the fourth floor was needed. It is decided to use 2kg PEK explosive. At 17:00 on the 28th the explosive creates a hole in a wall, stunning the terrorists. Commandos enter the room and after a momentary gunfight the two terrorists were killed with no more loss of life to the NSG. The hostages had been killed. There were signs of torture. On the second floor more hostages were found dead. A total of five hostages were found. David Kilcullen writes that the Holtzbergs' had been "horrifically tortured". The Times reported that "the terrorists would be told by their handlers in Pakistan that the lives of Jews were worth 50 times those of non-Jews."

== Attribution ==
Ajmal Kasab at Chhatrapati Shivaji Terminus with an AK-47 in his hand

The search regarding the identity of the terrorists started during the first attacks. During the searches, an unknown group calling itself the Mujahideen Hyderabad Deccan claimed responsibility for attacks in an email, which was later traced to Pakistan and was regarded as hoax.

The Mumbai attacks were planned and directed by Lashkar-e-Taiba militants inside Pakistan and carried out by 10 young armed men trained and sent to Mumbai and directed from inside Pakistan by mobile phones and VoIP.

In July 2009, Pakistani authorities confirmed that LeT plotted and financed the attacks from LeT camps in Karachi and Thatta. In November 2009, Pakistani authorities charged seven men they had arrested earlier, of planning and executing the assault.

Mumbai police department originally identified 37 suspects—including two Pakistan Army officers—for their alleged involvement in the plot. All but two of the suspects, many of whom are identified only through aliases, are Pakistani. David Coleman Headley and Tahawwur Hussain Rana, arrested in the United States in October 2009 for other attacks, were also found to have been involved in planning the Mumbai attacks. One of these men, Pakistani American David Headley (born Daood Sayed Gilani), was found to have made several trips to India before the attacks, and gathered video and GPS information on behalf of the plotters.

In April 2011, the United States issued arrest warrants for four Pakistani men as suspects in the attack. Three men, Sajid Mir, Abu Qahafa, and Mazhar Iqbal, alias "Major Iqbal", were believed to be members of Lashkar-e-Taiba, and helped plan and train the attackers.

=== Negotiations with Pakistan ===
Pakistani Prime Minister Yousaf Raza Gillani and President Asif Ali Zardari condemned the attacks. Pakistan promised to assist in the investigation, and President Zardari vowed "strong action against any Pakistani elements found involved in the attack". Pakistan initially denied that Pakistanis were responsible for the attacks, blaming plotters in Bangladesh and Indian criminals, a claim refuted by India, and saying they needed information from India on other bombings first. Pakistani authorities finally agreed that Ajmal Kasab was a Pakistani on 7 January 2009, and registered a case against three other Pakistani nationals.

The Indian government supplied evidence to Pakistan and other governments, in the form of interrogations, weapons, and call records of conversations during the attacks. In addition, Indian government officials said that the attacks were so sophisticated that they must have had official backing from Pakistani "agencies", an accusation denied by Pakistan.

Pakistan arrested a few members of Jamaat ud-Dawa and briefly put its founder under house arrest, but he was found to be free a few days later. A year after the attacks, Mumbai police continued to complain that Pakistani authorities were not co-operating by providing information for their investigation. Meanwhile, journalists in Pakistan said security agencies were preventing them from interviewing people from Kasab's village. The then Home Minister P. Chidambaram said the Pakistani authorities had not shared any information about American suspects David Headley and Tahawwur Hussain Rana, but that the FBI had been more forthcoming.

An Indian report, summarising intelligence gained from India's interrogation of David Headley, was released in October 2010. It alleged that Pakistan's intelligence agency (ISI) had provided support for the attacks by providing funding for reconnaissance missions in Mumbai. The report included Headley's claim that Lashkar-e-Taiba's chief military commander, Zaki-ur-Rahman Lakhvi, had close ties to the ISI. He alleged that "every big action of LeT is done in close coordination with [the] ISI."

In 2018, during an interview with newspaper Dawn, Pakistan's former Prime Minister Nawaz Sharif questioned Pakistan's inaction in preventing the Mumbai attacks.

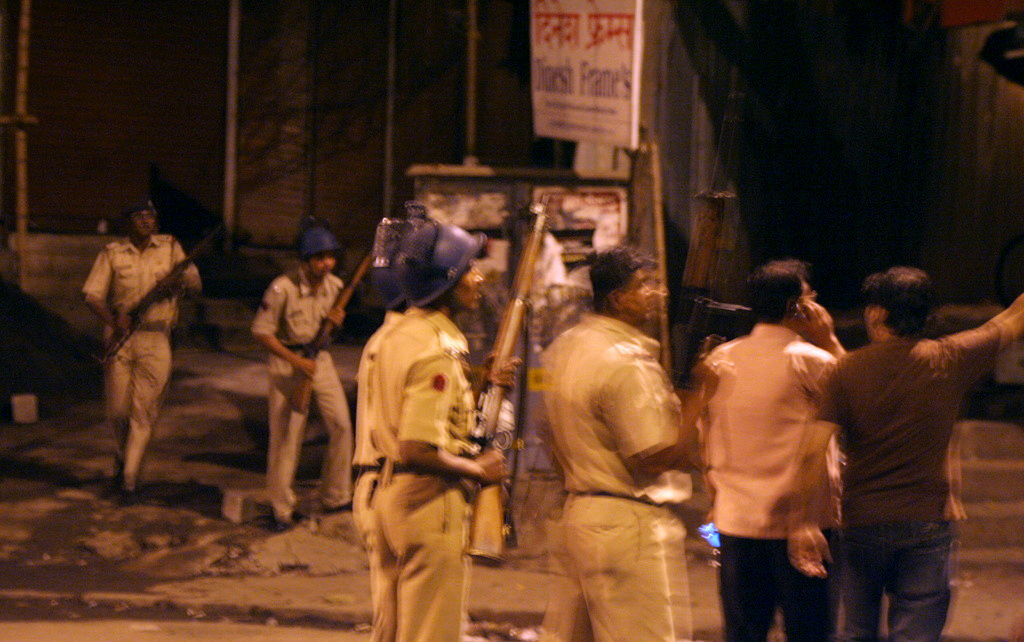
Police looking for attackers outside Colaba

=== Investigation ===
According to investigations, the attackers travelled by sea from Karachi, Pakistan, across the Arabian Sea, hijacked the Indian fishing trawler Kuber, killed the crew of four, then forced the captain to sail to Mumbai. After murdering the captain, the attackers entered Mumbai on a rubber dinghy. The captain of Kuber, Amar Singh Solanki, had earlier been imprisoned for six months in a Pakistani jail for illegally fishing in Pakistani waters. The attackers stayed and were trained by the Lashkar-e-Taiba in a safehouse at Azizabad in Karachi before boarding a small boat for Mumbai.

David Headley was a member of Lashkar-e-Taiba, and between 2002 and 2009, Headley travelled extensively as part of his work for LeT. Headley received training in small arms and countersurveillance from LeT, built a network of connections for the group, and lead in scoping out targets for Mumbai attack having allegedly been given $25,000 in cash in 2006 by an ISI officer known as Major Iqbal. The officer also helped him arrange a communications system for the attack and oversaw a model of the Taj Hotel, so that gunmen could know their way inside the target, according to Headley's testimony to Indian authorities. Headley also helped ISI recruit Indian agents to monitor Indian troop levels and movements, according to a US official. At the same time, Headley was also an informant for the US Drug Enforcement Administration, and Headley's wives warned American officials of Headley's involvement with LeT and his plotting attacks, warning specifically that the Taj Hotel may be their target.

US officials believed that the ISI officers provided support to LeT militants who carried out the attacks. Disclosures made by former American intelligence contractor Edward Snowden in 2013 revealed that the Central Intelligence Agency (CIA) had intercepted communications between the Lashkar boat and the LeT headquarters in Pakistan-administered Kashmir and passed the alert on to RAW on 18 November, eight days before the terrorists actually struck Mumbai. In the hours after the attack, the New York City Police Department sent Brandon del Pozo, an official from their intelligence division, to investigate the incident to understand what vulnerabilities its methods posed for New York City.

The arrest of Zabiuddin Ansari, alias Abu Hamza, in June 2012 provided further clarity on how the plot was hatched. According to Abu Hamza, the attacks were previously scheduled for 2006, using Indian youth for the job. However, a huge cache of AK-47s and RDX, which were to be used for the attacks, was recovered from Aurangabad in 2006, thus leading to the dismantling of the original plot. Subsequently, Abu Hamza fled to Pakistan and along with Lashkar commanders, scouted for Pakistani youth to be used for the attacks. In September 2007, 10 people were selected for the mission. In September 2008, these people tried sailing to Mumbai from Karachi, but could not complete their mission due to choppy waters. These men made a second attempt in November 2008, and successfully managed to execute the final attacks. David Headley's disclosures that three Pakistani army officers were associated with the planning and execution of the attack were substantiated by Ansari's revelations during his interrogation.

After Ansari's arrest, Pakistan's Foreign Office claimed they had received information that up to 40 Indian nationals were involved in the attacks.

In his confession, Ajmal Kasab, the only gunman captured, shared the location of LeT's training camps in Muridke, Pakistan, called as Markaz Taiba, and in Muzzafarabad, apart from the routine of their training, which included indoctrination, basic combat, advanced weapons and explosives, and commando tactics. On 7 May 2025, the Muridke camp was destroyed in a missile strike by the Indian Armed Forces in retaliation for the Pahalgam terrorist attack, which was also perpetrated by the Lashkar-e-Taiba. The strikes reportedly killed Lashkar's HQ chief Mudassar aka Abu Jundal (not to be confused with 26/11 co-conspirator Zabiuddin Ansari who used the alias Abu Jundal) among several other terrorists.

=== Method ===
The attackers had planned the attack several months ahead of time, and knew some areas well enough to vanish and reappear after security forces had left. Several sources have quoted Kasab telling the police that the group received help from Mumbai residents. The attackers used at least three SIM cards purchased on the Indian side of the border with Bangladesh. There were also reports of a SIM card purchased in the US state of New Jersey. Police had also mentioned that Faheem Ansari, an Indian Lashkar operative who had been arrested in February 2008, had scouted the Mumbai targets for the November attacks. Later, the police arrested two Indian suspects, Mikhtar Ahmad, who is from Srinagar in Kashmir, and Tausif Rehman, a resident of Kolkata. They supplied the SIM cards, one in Calcutta, and the other in New Delhi.

The attackers used a satellite phone and cell phones to talk to each other, as well as their handlers who were based in Pakistan. In transcripts intercepted by Indian authorities between the attackers and their handlers, the handlers provided the attackers with encouragement, tactical advice, and information gained from media coverage. The attackers used both personal cell phones and those obtained from their victims to communicate with each other and the news media. Although the attackers were encouraged to murder hostages, the attackers were in communication with the news media via cell phones to make demands in return for the release of hostages. This was believed to be done to further confuse Indian authorities that they were dealing with primarily a hostage situation.

Type 86 grenades made by China's state-owned Norinco were used in the attacks.

Also, indications arose that the attackers had been taking cocaine. The gunman who survived said that the attackers had used Google Earth to familiarise themselves with the locations of buildings used in the attacks.

Of the 10 gunmen, nine were subsequently shot dead and one was captured by security forces. Witnesses reported that they seemed to be in their early 20s, wore black T-shirts and jeans, and smiled and looked happy as they shot their victims.

Initially, some of the attackers reported to be British citizens, but the Indian government later stated that there was no evidence to confirm this. Similarly, early reports of 12 gunmen were also later shown to be incorrect.

On 9 December, the 10 attackers were identified by Mumbai police, along with their home towns in Pakistan: Ajmal Amir Kasab from Faridkot, Abu Ismail Dera Ismail Khan from Dera Ismail Khan, Hafiz Arshad and Babr Imran from Multan, Javed from Okara, Shoaib from Sialkot, Nazir Ahmed and Nasir from Faisalabad, Abdul Rahman from Arifwalla, and Fahadullah from Dipalpur Taluka. Dera Ismail Khan is in the North-West Frontier Province; the rest of the towns are in Pakistani Punjab.

On 6 April 2010, the Home Minister of Maharashtra, informed the assembly that the bodies of the nine killed Pakistani gunmen from the 2008 attack on Mumbai were buried in a secret location in January 2010, although several organizations advocated for a sea burial. The bodies had been in the mortuary of a Mumbai hospital after Muslim clerics in the city refused to let them be buried on their grounds.

=== Arrests ===
Ajmal Kasab was the only attacker captured by law enforcement officers, specifically by the Mumbai Police. At first, he deposed to police inspector Ramesh Mahale that he had come to India "to see Amitabh Bachchan's bungalow", and that he was apprehended by the Mumbai Police outside the bungalow. Much of the information about the attackers' preparation, travel, and movements comes from his subsequent confessions to the Mumbai police. Kasab was hanged in Yerwada Central Jail in 2012.

On 12 February 2009, Pakistani Interior Minister Rehman Malik said that Pakistani national Javed Iqbal, who acquired VoIP phones in Spain for the Mumbai attackers, and Hamad Ameen Sadiq, who had facilitated money transfer for the attack, had been arrested. Two other men known as Khan and Riaz, but whose full names were not given, were also arrested. Two Pakistanis were arrested in Brescia, Italy (east of Milan), on 21 November 2009, after being accused of providing logistical support to the attacks and transferring more than US$200 to Internet accounts using a false ID. They had Red Corner Notices issued against them by Interpol for their suspected involvement and it was issued after the last year's strikes.

In October 2009, two Chicago men were arrested and charged by the FBI for involvement in "terrorism" abroad, David Coleman Headley and Tahawwur Hussain Rana. Headley, a Pakistani American, was charged in November 2009 with scouting locations for the 2008 Mumbai attacks. Headley is reported to have posed as an American Jew and is believed to have links with militant Islamist groups based in Bangladesh. On 18 March 2010, Headley pleaded guilty to a dozen charges against him thereby avoiding going to trial.

In December 2009, the FBI charged Abdur Rehman Hashim Syed, a retired major in the Pakistani Army, for planning the attacks in association with Headley.

On 15 January 2010, in a successful snatch operation, R&AW agents nabbed Sheikh Abdul Khwaja, one of the handlers of the 26/11 attacks, chief of HuJI India operations and a most wanted suspect in India, from Colombo, Sri Lanka, and brought him over to Hyderabad, India, for formal arrest.

On 25 June 2012, the Delhi Police Department arrested Zabiuddin Ansari, alias Abu Hamza, one of the key suspects in the attack at the Indira Gandhi International Airport in New Delhi. His arrest was touted as the most significant development in the case since Kasab's arrest. Security agencies had been chasing him for three years in Delhi. Ansari is a LeT ultra and the Hindi tutor of the 10 attackers who were responsible for the Mumbai attacks in 2008. He was apprehended, after he was arrested and deported to India by Saudi Intelligence officials as per official request by Indian authorities. After Ansari's arrest, investigations revealed that in 2009 he allegedly stayed for a day in a room in Old Legislators's Hostel, belonging to Fauzia Khan, a former MLA and minister in Maharashtra government. The minister, however, denied having any links with him. Home Minister P. Chidambaram asserted that Ansari was provided a safe place in Pakistan and was present in the control room, which could not have been established without active State support. Ansari's interrogation further revealed that Sajid Mir and a Pakistani Army major visited India under fake names as cricket spectators to survey targets in Delhi and Mumbai for about a fortnight.

Sajid Mir, a Pakistani citizen and key operative of the militant Islamic extremist group LeT, is seen as one of the main organisers of the 2008 attacks. He has been called the "mastermind" and "project manager". Mir is on the U.S. Federal Bureau of Investigation's Most Wanted list and the United States Department of State offers in its Rewards for Justice Program, a reward of up to $5 million for information leading to the arrest and conviction of Mir. Mir has carried out terrorism operations in different parts of the world, including France.

Jason M. Blazakis, professor of practice at Middlebury Institute of International Studies at Monterey, stated in 2018 in The Hill: "A lethal, miasmic mix of bureaucratic inertia, diplomatic dysfunction and misperception has contributed to the fact that LeT members Sajid Mir, Mazhar Iqbal, Abu Qahafa (his nom de guerre), and their ISI handler, Major Iqbal (no relation to Mazhar), roam free."

On April 10, 2025, the NIA formally arrested Tahawwur Rana after his arrival from the U.S.

== Casualties and compensation ==
Nationality	Deaths	Injured
India	141	256
United States	6 (Note: Two with dual US-Israeli citizenship.)	2
Israel	4	–
Germany	3	3
Australia	2	2
Canada	2	2
France	2	–
Italy	1	–
United Kingdom	1 (Note: Dual British-Cypriot citizenship.)	7
Netherlands	1	1
Japan	1	1
Jordan	1	1
Malaysia	1	–
Mauritius	1	–
Mexico	1	–
Singapore	1	–
Thailand	1	–
Austria	–	1
Spain	–	2
China	–	1
Oman	–	2
Philippines	–	1
Finland	–	1
Norway	–	1
Total	166	293

A total of 164 to 166 civilians and security personnel were killed in the attacks. Among the dead were 26 foreign nationals from 14 countries. Nine attackers were killed (and one captured). Injuries numbered over 300. The deaths and injuries were due to bullet wounds and blast wounds. A total of 38.5% of patients arriving at hospitals required surgery for bullet and shrapnel injuries. Sir JJ Group of Hospitals treatment and postmortem data showed four died from postoperative septicemia. A large majority of deaths and injuries were men. The bodies of many of the dead hostages showed signs of torture or disfigurement. A number of those killed were notable figures in business, media, and security services. This includes Gavriel Holtzberg, Andreas Liveras, Ralph Burkei, Loumia Hiridjee, and Sabina Sehgal Saikia. The deputy chief minister of Maharashtra said that the terrorists planned to kill 5000 people. Unexploded RDX was found near Taj Mahal Palace Hotel.

The chief minister of Maharashtra, Vilasrao Deshmukh, said that 15 policemen and two NSG commandos were killed, including the following officers: Assistant Police Sub-Inspector Tukaram Omble, Joint Commissioner of Police Hemant Karkare (the Chief of the Mumbai Anti-Terrorism Squad), Additional Commissioner of Police Ashok Kamte, Encounter specialist Senior Inspector Vijay Salaskar, Senior Inspector Shashank Shinde, NSG Commando Major Sandeep Unnikrishnan, and NSG Commando Hawaldar Gajender Singh Bisht. According to compensation figures, 22 security personnel died in the attack. Six security personnel were awarded the Ashok Chakra, India's highest peacetime military decoration. Three railway officials of Chhatrapati Shivaji Maharaj Terminus were also killed.

The casualties occurred in the following locations:

Location	Coordinates	Type of attack	Dead	
Location	Coordinates	Type of attack	Civilians	Security personnel
Chhatrapati Shivaji Terminus (CST) railway station; (express train terminus), (suburban terminus)	18.940631°N 72.836426°E, 18.94061°N 72.835343°E	Shootings; grenade attacks	58	3
The Taj Mahal Palace Hotel near the Gateway of India	18.921739°N 72.83331°E	Shootings; six explosions; fire on ground, first, and top floors; hostages; RDX found nearby	36	2
Oberoi Trident at Nariman Point	18.927118°N 72.820618°E	Shootings; explosions; hostages; fire	30/ 35	-
Leopold Cafe, a popular tourist restaurant in Colaba	18.922272°N 72.831566°E	Shootings; grenade explosion	10	-
Metro Big Cinemas	18.943178°N 72.829474°E	Shooting from carjacked police jeep	~10	-
Nariman House (Chabad House) Jewish outreach centre	18.916517°N 72.827682°E	Siege; shootings; hostages	6	1
Badruddin Tayabji Lane behind the Times of India building	18.942117°N 72.833734°E	Police killed by gunfire	-	7
Cama and Albless Hospital	18.94266°N 72.832993°E	Shootings	-	~5
Mumbai Harbour		Shootings; hostages	4	-
Vile Parle suburb near the airport, North Mumbai		Car bomb blast	2	-
Mazagaon docks in Mumbai's port area		Explosion; boat with armaments seized	none	-

The government of Maharashtra announced about ₹500,000 (equivalent to ₹1.5 million or US$16,000 in 2026) as compensation to the kin of each of those killed in the terror attacks and about ₹50,000 to the seriously injured. The chief minister of Uttarakhand announced aid of ₹500,000 to the family of NSG Commando Hawaldar Gajender Singh Bisht. Free treatment was offered to the injured. In August 2009, the Indian Hotels Company and the Oberoi Group received about US$28 million as part-payment of the insurance claims, on account of the attacks on Taj and Trident, from General Insurance Corporation of India.

== Aftermath ==
The attacks are sometimes referred to in India as "26/11", after the date in 2008 that the attacks began. The Pradhan Inquiry Commission, appointed by the Maharashtra government, produced a report that was tabled before the legislative assembly more than a year after the events. The report said the "war-like" attack was beyond the capacity to respond of any police force, but also found fault with the Mumbai Police Commissioner Hasan Gafoor's lack of leadership during the crisis.

The Maharashtra government planned to buy 36 speed boats to patrol the coastal areas and several helicopters for the same purpose, along with installation of surveillance cameras citywide. It also planned to create an anti-terror force called "Force One" and upgrade all the weapons that Mumbai police had prior to the attack. Prime Minister Manmohan Singh declared during an all-party conference that the legal framework would be strengthened in the battle against terrorism and that a federal anti-terrorist intelligence and investigation agency, similar to the FBI in the United States, would be set up soon to co-ordinate action against terrorism. The government strengthened anti-terror laws with UAPA 2008, and the federal National Investigation Agency was formed.

A Public Interest Litigation was filed by social activist Ketan Tirodkar to demand equal justice for all the police who were killed in the terror attack; especially for the members of the Bomb Disposal Squad of Mumbai Police. During the hearing of the petition, the government informed the High Court that the Union government of India rejected the proposal to award the Bomb Disposal Squad of the city police for their contribution in defusing grenades in the terror attack.

The attacks also resulted in the suspension of peace talks between India and Pakistan, significantly increasing tensions between the two countries. India's then External Affairs Minister Pranab Mukherjee declared that India may indulge in military strikes against terror camps in Pakistan to protect its territorial integrity. There were also after-effects on the United States's relationships with both countries, the US-led NATO war in Afghanistan, and on the global war on terror. FBI chief Robert Mueller praised the "unprecedented cooperation" between American and Indian intelligence agencies over the Mumbai terror attack probe. However, Interpol secretary general Ronald Noble said that Indian intelligence agencies did not share any information with Interpol.

A new National Counter Terrorism Centre (NCTC) was proposed to be set up by the then-Home Minister P. Chidambaram as an office to collect, collate, summarise, integrate, analyse, co-ordinate and report all information and inputs received from various intelligence agencies, state police departments, and other ministries and their departments.

The attack led to an increase in anti-Pakistan sentiments across India, especially from right wing political groups, which continued in the aftermath. Similar sentiments were echoed elsewhere, most notably in the United States of America, as 6 American citizens were killed in the attack. Following the attack, as well as raid in Abbottabad in May 2011 that killed 9/11 mastermind Osama bin Laden, anti-Pakistan views and hate crimes against Pakistani origin people surged in the United States. Consequently, due to such hate crimes and views, many Pakistanis and Pakistani-Americans have identified themselves as Indians to avoid discrimination and obtain jobs.

The attacks caused a major economic loss to the city of Mumbai worth ₹40 billion ($818.33 million in 2008 exchange rates), as hotels, businesses, and shops were closed during that period, along with the temporary suspension of trading at the Bombay Stock Exchange. In addition, insurance claims worth over ₹6 billion ($122 million) were settled, due to loss of lives and property damage caused by the terrorists. The attacks took place at a time, when the 2008 financial crisis caused major economic impact worldwide, despite India's economy being noted as second fastest growing during that period. In addition to the economic losses, several airlines like Delta, Continental (now United), Lufthansa, and several others temporarily cancelled international flights towards Mumbai International Airport in the interest of passenger and crew safety, and later resuming after the last terrorist was killed, while some airlines like British Airways, Emirates and Air India maintained their flight schedules during the attacks.

=== Movement of troops ===
Pakistan moved troops towards the border with India voicing concerns about the Indian government's possible plans to launch attacks on Pakistani soil if it did not co-operate. After days of talks, the Pakistan government, however, decided to start moving troops away from the border.

== Reactions ==
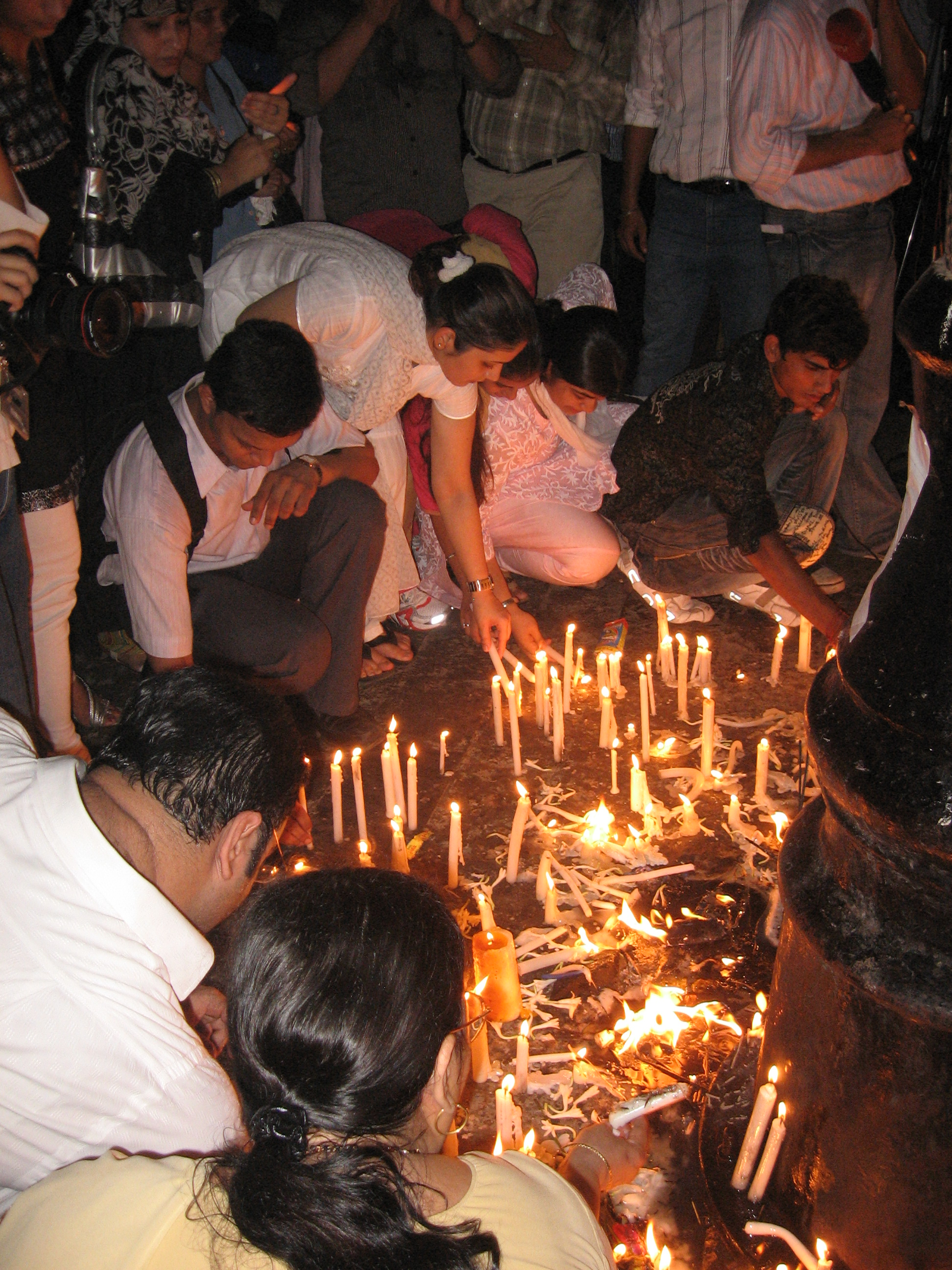
Candlelight vigils at the Gateway of India in Mumbai

Indians criticised their political leaders after the attacks, saying that their ineptness was partly responsible. The Times of India commented on its front page that "Our politicians fiddle as innocents die." Political reactions in Mumbai and India included a range of resignations and political changes, including the resignations of Minister for Home Affairs Shivraj Patil, Chief Minister Vilasrao Deshmukh and deputy chief minister R. R. Patil for controversial reactions to the attack including taking the former's son and Bollywood director Ram Gopal Varma to tour the damaged Taj Hotel and the latter's remarks that the attacks were not a big deal in such a large city. Indian Muslims condemned the attacks and refused to allow burial of the bodies of the attackers in their graveyards. Groups of Muslims marched against the attacks and mosques observed silence. Prominent Muslim personalities such as Bollywood actor Aamir Khan appealed to their community members in the country to observe Eid al-Adha as a day of mourning on 9 December. The business establishment also reacted, with changes to transport, and requests for an increase in self-defence capabilities. The attacks also triggered a chain of citizens' movements across India such as the India Today Group's "War Against Terror" campaign. There were vigils held across all of India with candles and placards commemorating the victims of the attacks. The NSG commandos based in Delhi also met criticism for taking ten hours to reach the three sites under attack.

Additionally, anti-Pakistan protests took place in Mumbai and nationwide in the aftermath of the attack. During the protests, demonstrators shouted Pakistan Murdabad (meaning Down with Pakistan), and many demanding cutting any ties with Pakistan. The sentiments against Pakistan surged after the attack in Mumbai, especially among Indian diaspora worldwide, and largely intensified after the 2019 Pulwama attack and the 2025 Pahalgam attack.

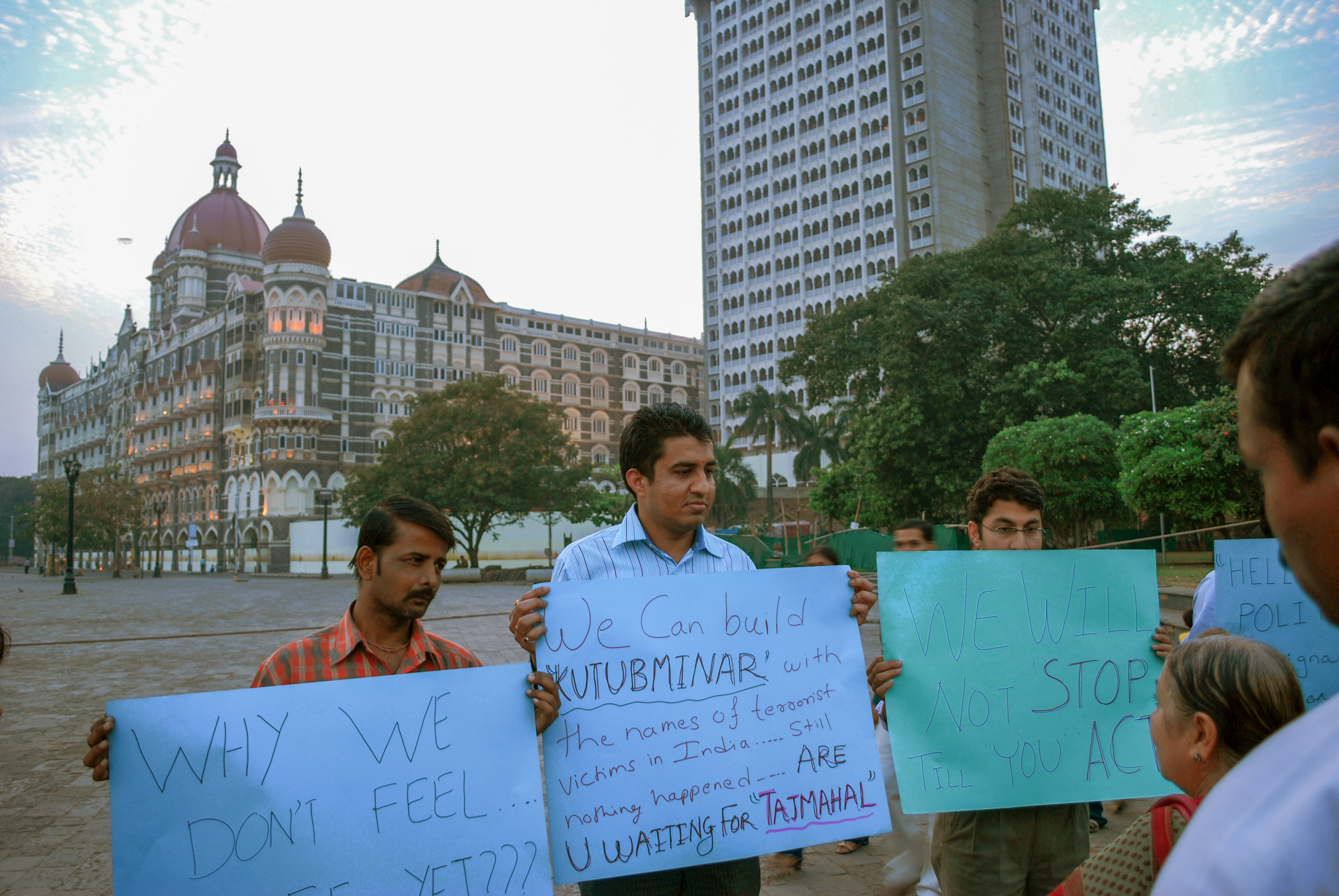
Citizens gather outside The Taj Mahal Palace Hotel demanding the government take action.

On 28 December 2010, 2 years after the attack, UPA leader Digvijaya Singh was criticised for attending a book launch which described that the Rashtriya Swayamsevak Sangh had conspired the attack. The book RSS ki Saazish (meaning Conspiracy by RSS), written by Aziz Burney, was extremely condemned by RSS members and opposition leaders. Furthermore, the Congress party was also slammed for coining the terms of Hindu terrorists and Saffron terror, relating to several terror attacks across the nation before the November 2008 attack in Mumbai, most notably the bombings in Jaipur, Bangalore, Ahmedabad, and Delhi.

International reaction for the attacks was widespread, with many countries and international organisations condemning the attacks and expressing their condolences to the civilian victims. Many important personalities around the world also condemned the attacks.

Media coverage highlighted the use of social media and social networking tools, including Twitter and Flickr, in spreading information about the attacks. In addition, many Indian bloggers offered live textual coverage of the attacks. A map of the attacks was set up by a web journalist using Google Maps. The New York Times, in July 2009, described the event as "what may be the most well-documented terrorist attack anywhere".

In November 2010, families of American victims of the attacks filed a lawsuit in Brooklyn, New York, naming Lt. Gen. Ahmed Shuja Pasha, chief of the ISI, as being complicit in the Mumbai attacks. On 22 September 2011, the attack on the American Embassy in Afghanistan was attributed to Pakistan via cell phone records identical to the attacks in Mumbai, also linked to Pakistan.

On 30 September 2025, P. Chidambaram, who was appointed as home minister in the aftermath of the attack during the UPA government following the resignation of Shivraj Patil due to mishandling the event, revealed that in the aftermath of the attack, the government had decided not to retaliate against Pakistan for sponsoring the attack, due to intense international pressure, although they were ready to act. Several BJP leaders condemned the admission and accused the Congress party for being soft on Pakistan, commenting that the statement came too little, too late.

== Trials ==
=== In India ===
==== Trial of Ajmal Kasab ====
Kasab's trial was delayed due to legal issues, as many Indian lawyers were unwilling to represent him. A Mumbai Bar Association passed a resolution proclaiming that none of its members would represent Kasab. However, the Chief Justice of India stated that Kasab needed a lawyer for a fair trial. A lawyer for Kasab was eventually found, but was replaced due to a conflict of interest. On 25 February 2009, Indian investigators filed an 11,000-page chargesheet, formally charging Kasab with murder, conspiracy, and waging war against India among other charges.

Kasab's trial began on 23 March 2009, and he pled not guilty on 6 May 2009. On 10 June 2009, Devika Rotawan, a child who had been shot in her leg during the attack, identified Kasab as one of the attackers during her testimony. He pled guilty on 20 July 2009. The judge found many of the 86 charges were not addressed in his confession, and therefore the trial continued 23 July 2009. Kasab initially apologised for the attacks and said he deserved the death penalty for his crimes, but on 18 December 2009, retracted his confession, and said he had been forced by police to make his confession.

Kasab was convicted of all 86 charges on 3 May 2010. He was found guilty of murder for directly killing seven people, conspiracy to commit murder for the deaths of the 164 people killed in the three-day terror siege, waging war against India, causing terror, and of conspiracy to murder two high-ranking police officers. On 6 May 2010, he was sentenced to death by hanging. However, he appealed his sentence at high court. On 21 February 2011, the Bombay High Court upheld the death sentence of Kasab, dismissing his appeal.

On 29 August 2012, the Indian Supreme Court upheld the death sentence for Kasab. The court stated, "We are left with no option but to award death penalty. The primary and foremost offence committed by Kasab is waging war against the government of India". The verdict followed 10 weeks of appeal hearings, and was decided by a two-judge Supreme Court panel, which was led by Judge Aftab Alam. The panel rejected arguments that Kasab was denied a free and fair trial.

Kasab filed a mercy petition with the President of India, which was rejected on 5 November. On November 21, 2012, at 7:30 AM, Kasab was hanged in Pune's Yerwada jail. The Indian embassy in Islamabad informed the Pakistani government of Kasab's hanging via letter. Pakistan refused to take the letter, which was then faxed to them. His family in Pakistan was sent news of his hanging via a courier.

==== Trial of Zabiuddin Ansari ====
Zabiuddin Ansari, also known as Abu Hamza, a radicalized Indian national working for the Lashkar-e-Taiba, who was extradited from Saudi Arabia in June 2012, was interrogated by authorities in India on his role in the attack. While he revealed that the plot was planned for 2006 using Indian youth, the huge cache of arms and ammunition to be used for the attacks were seized in Aurangabad. On 2 August 2016, he was sentenced to life imprisonment in relation to the arms haul case by the special MCOCA court.

==== In Absentia Trial of Hafiz Saeed and Co-conspirators ====
In August 2026, the Mumbai Police initiated an "in absentia" trial against Hafiz Saeed, Zaki-ur-Rehman Lakhvi, Sajid Mir, Abu Alqama, Asim alias Abu Qahafa, and Major Abdur Rehman Pasha over their role in the attacks under Section 356 of the Bharatiya Nagarik Suraksha Sanhita. As Hafiz Saeed and Zaki-ur-Rehman Lakhvi are still in Pakistan, the Mumbai Police has approached Interpol through the Ministry of Home Affairs (MHA), seeking its assistance in serving the proclamation order on all six accused Pakistani nationals.

=== In Pakistan ===
Indian and Pakistani police exchanged DNA evidence, photographs and items found with the attackers to piece together a detailed portrait of the Mumbai plot. Police in Pakistan arrested seven people, including Hammad Amin Sadiq, a homoeopathic pharmacist, who arranged bank accounts and secured supplies. Sadiq and six others began their formal trial on 3 October 2009 in Pakistan. Indian authorities said the prosecution stopped well short of top Lashkar leaders. In November 2009, Indian Prime Minister Manmohan Singh said that Pakistan had not done enough to bring the perpetrators of the attacks to justice.

An eight-member commission comprising defence lawyers, prosecutors and a court official was allowed to travel to India on 15 March 2013 to gather evidence for the prosecution of seven suspects linked to the 2008 Mumbai attacks. However, the defence lawyers were barred from cross-examining the four prosecution witnesses in the case including Ajmal Kasab. On the eve of the first anniversary of 26/11, a Pakistani anti-terror court formally charged seven accused, including LeT operations commander Zaki ur Rehman Lakhvi. However, the actual trial started on 5 May 2012. The Pakistani court conducting trial of Mumbai attacks accused, reserved its judgement on the application filed by Lakhvi, challenging the report of the judicial panel, to 17 July 2012. On 17 July 2012, the court refused to take the findings of the Pakistani judicial commission as part of the evidence. However, it ruled that if a new agreement, which allows the panel's examination of witnesses, is reached, the prosecution may make an application for sending the panel to Mumbai. The Indian government, upset over the court ruling, however, contended that evidence collected by the Pakistani judicial panel has evidential value to punish all those involved in the attack. On 21 September 2013, a Pakistani judicial commission arrived in India to carry out the investigation and to cross examine the witnesses. This is the second such visit: the one in March 2012 was not a success as its report was rejected by an anti-terrorism court in Pakistan due to lack of evidence.

On 17 July 2019, Hafiz Saeed, the founder of Lashkar-e-Taiba and one of the co-conspirators of the attack, was arrested in Gujranwala by the Punjab Counter Terrorism Department (CTD) on the charges of terror financing, after it was found that Saeed's group Jamat-ud-Dawa (JuD) was financing terrorism from the funds collected by several non-profit organisations. Saeed was sentenced to serve 15 years in December 2020 on several charges of terror financing, which was extended to 31 years in April 2022. The following month, on 2 January 2021, Zakiur Rehman Lakhvi, another mastermind of the attack, was arrested on the same charges of terror financing, and handed a 15-year sentence. The arrests and sentencing were carried out after the Financial Action Task Force (FATF) threatened the government of Pakistan to be put in the FATF Blacklist for failure to comply on money laundering and financing of terrorism, as Pakistan suffered from an economic crisis in 2022 after being put on the FATF grey list in 2018.

On 24 June 2022, Sajid Mir, the co-plotter of the attack and a Pakistan Army Officer, was sentenced to 15 years for terror financing. Mir was earlier declared dead and Pakistan had denied his presence, but due to compliance of FATF actions, Pakistan was forced to admit about his existence. An interrogation with Sayed Zabiuddin Ansari revealed that Mir scouted targets in 2005 with a fake name and passport under the cricket diplomacy to watch the India-Pakistan ODI Cricket match at Mohali. Additionally, Ansari stated that after visiting several places in India, Mir prepared the Taj Hotel's miniature model to familiarise the attackers with the hotel. Mir was reportedly poisoned in prison in December 2023. Following the conviction of Mir, Lakhvi and Saeed, the Financial Action Task Force removed Pakistan from the greylist in October 2022.

On 15 November 2024, 11 days before the 16th anniversary of the attack, a video verified through facial recognition revealed about co-conspirator Zakiur Rehman Lakhvi participating in a fitness test, which questioned about Pakistan's compliance with international sanctions from the FATF. Despite his conviction, Lakhvi was reported to move freely in Lahore, Rawalpindi, and Okara. India Today's intelligence sources described his arrest as a pseudo-event and cover-up, with no genuine enforcement of restrictions and pretense on seriousness to tackle terrorism.

=== In the United States ===
The LeT operative David Headley (born Daood Sayed Gilani) in his testimony before a Chicago federal court during co-accused Tahawwur Rana's trial revealed that Mumbai Chabad House was added to the list of targets for surveillance given by his Inter Services Intelligence handler Major Iqbal, though the Oberoi Hotel, one of the sites attacked, was not originally on the list. On 10 June 2011, Tahawwur Rana was acquitted of plotting the 2008 Mumbai attacks but was held guilty on two other charges. He was sentenced to 14 years in federal prison on 17 January 2013. In May 2023, a US court approved his extradition to India where he is sought for his involvement in the 2008 Mumbai terror attacks.

David Headley pleaded guilty to 12 counts related to the attacks, including conspiracy to commit murder in India and aiding and abetting in the murder of six Americans. On 23 January 2013, he was sentenced to 35 years in federal prison. His plea that he not be extradited to India, Pakistan or Denmark was accepted.

=== Extradition of Tahawwur Rana ===
On 13 February 2025, US President Donald Trump confirmed the extradition of Rana to India, which was confirmed by the Supreme Court of the United States in May 2023, after the government of India renewed its request for his extradition. On 8 April 2025, after Rana's last plea to stop his extradition was rejected by the Supreme Court of the United States, a team of National Investigation Agency officers arrived in the United States to take Rana into custody. He arrived in Delhi on 10 April 2025.

== Memorials ==
On the first anniversary of the event, the state paid homage to the victims of the attack. Force One—a new security force created by the Maharashtra government—staged a parade from Nariman Point to Chowpatty. Other memorials and candlelight vigils were also organised at the various locations where the attacks occurred.

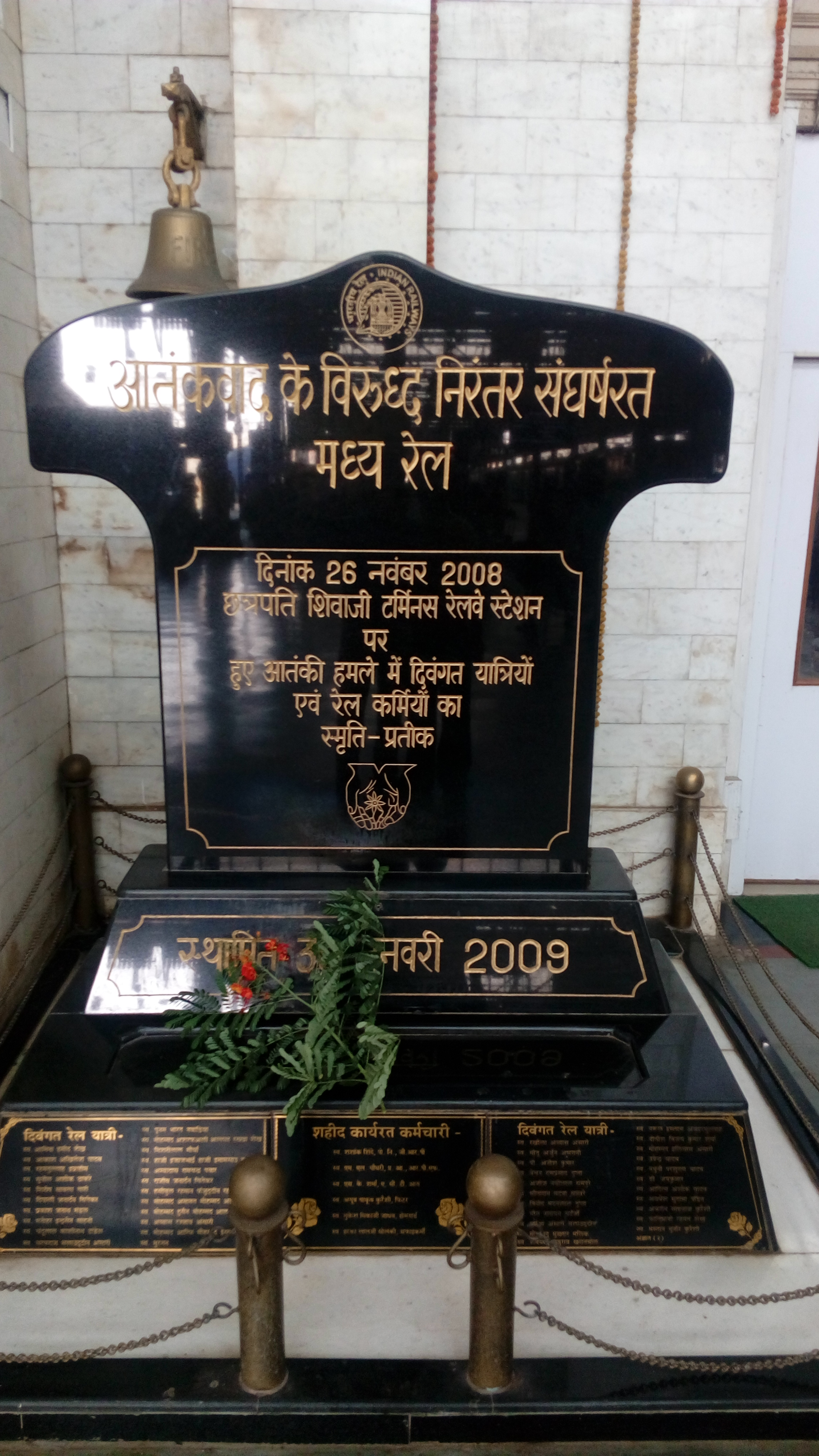
Mumbai 26/11 Attacks memorial bearing the names of people killed at Chhatrapati Shivaji Terminus

On the second anniversary of the event, homage was again paid to the victims.

On the 10th anniversary of the 26/11 Mumbai terror attacks, Nariman House, one of the several establishments that were targeted by the Lashkar-e-Taiba terrorists, were to be declared a memorial and renamed as Nariman Light House.

The Indian Express group hosts an annual memorial event, 26/11 – Stories of Strength, in Mumbai to pay homage to those killed in the ghastly terror attacks in the city in 2008. The memorial event started in 2016, is now organised at the Gateway of India and brings forth the inspiring stories of courage and strength of more than 100 survivors that the Indian Express has interviewed over the past decade. Actor Amitabh Bachchan has been the brand ambassador for the event over the years.

On 22 November 2025, 4 days before the 17th anniversary of the attack, actor Shah Rukh Khan, along with prominent public figures and Maharashtra Chief Minister Devendra Fadnavis paid tribute to the victims at the Global Peace Awards held the Gateway of India in Mumbai, near to the Taj Hotel, one of the sites of the attack. In his speech, Khan also paid tribute to the security personnel who were martyred in the attacks, while stating that when peace prevails, nothing can shake or defeat India, or break the spirit of its people.

On 20 October 2026, US Secretary of State Marco Rubio laid a wreath at Mumbai's Taj Mahal Palace Hotel in memory of the 166 people killed in the 26/11 terror attacks,including 6 Americans.

== Published accounts ==
=== Documentaries ===
- Mumbai Massacre (2009), television documentary film by Victoria Midwinter Pitt about survivors of the attack. Originally broadcast by the Australian Broadcasting Corporation, it was re-edited for PBS' Secrets of the Dead as the episode "Mumbai Massacre", it was also shown in Four Corners as the twenty-sixth episode of season 49.
- Terror in Mumbai (2009), British television documentary film by Dan Reed, broadcast by HBO which features audio tapes of the intercepted phone calls between the young gunmen and their controllers in Pakistan, and testimony from the sole surviving gunman.
- Mumbai Terror Attacks (2010), Indian television documentary film by Ashish R. Shukla produced by Miditech and broadcast by Nat Geo India.
- "City Under Siege" (2012), directed by Matthew Hinchcliffe, first episode of the television documentary series Black Ops with a focus on the rescue operation during the attacks.
- "Terror in Mumbai" (2011), directed by Mike Phillips, fourth episode of the American television docudrama series Got Home Alive, about foreign tourists caught in the attacks.
- "Mumbai Massacre" (2012), directed by Stan Griffin, sixth episode of season 5 of the television docudrama series Seconds from Disaster, focusing on intelligence failures which lead to the attacks.
- "Operation Black Tornado" (2018), third episode of the Indian television documentary series Battle Ops on the online channel Veer by Discovery.
- Rubaru Roshni (2019), Indian documentary film by Svati Chakravarty Bhatkal broadcast by Star India, about survivors of the attacks.

=== Films ===
- Ashok Chakra: Tribute to Real Heroes (2010), a Hindi-language action-drama film, based on the attacks, directed by S.P. Muneshwar.
- Crackers (2011), Indian animated film by Anil Goyal, inspired by the attacks.
- Operation Mumbai (2012), Indian action film by Ajit Varma which dramatises the events of the attacks including the motivations of Ajmal Kasab.
- Shahid (2012), Indian biographical drama film by Hansal Mehta, based on the life of lawyer and human rights activist Shahid Azmi – assassinated in 2010 after agreeing to defend Faheem Ansari who was accused of abetting the terrorists (was later found not-guilty by the courts).
- The Attacks of 26/11 (2013), Indian action thriller film directed by Ram Gopal Varma, depicting the attacks based on the book Kasab: The Face of 26/11 by Rommel Rodrigues with a focus on Ajmal Kasab.
- Arrambam (2013), Indian action-thriller film by Vishnuvardhan about counter-terrorism operations in India, inspired by the attacks.
- Phantom (2015), Indian action-thriller film by Kabir Khan, an alternative-historical account about the assassination of Lashkar-e-Taiba chief Hafiz Saeed.
- Taj Mahal (2015), French-Belgian thriller-drama film directed and written by Nicolas Saada. It was screened in the Horizons section at the 72nd Venice International Film Festival. The film is about an 18-year-old French girl who was alone in her hotel room when the terrorists attacked the hotel.
- Mumbai Siege: 4 Days of Terror (also known as One Less God) (2017), independent Australian film directed by Lliam Worthington, featuring the situation of some foreigners inside Taj Hotel.
- Hotel Mumbai (2019), Indian action thriller film directed by Anthony Maras and written by John Collee and Maras. It has come under criticism for omitting any reference to the role of Pakistan in the terror strikes.
- Punha 26/11 (Again 26/11), Indian action film set in the aftermath of the attacks with efforts to avert another strike on Mumbai.
- The Interview (2021), Indian thriller film written and directed by Laurence Postma, about a journalist who foregoes the coverage of the attacks to interview a Bollywood actress.
- Sooryavanshi (2021), Indian action film by Rohit Shetty set in the aftermath of the counter-terrorism operations following the attacks.
- Major (2022), Indian biographical-action film directed by Sashi Kiran Tikka. Shot simultaneously in Telugu and Hindi languages, the film is based on the life of Major Sandeep Unnikrishnan, who was killed while rescuing hostages during the attacks.
- Dhurandhar (2025), Indian spy action thriller by Aditya Dhar. The plot revolves around several terror incidents in India such as the 1999 IC-814 hijacking, the 2001 Indian Parliament attack and the 2008 Mumbai attacks.

=== Television ===
- Operation 26/11 (2021), Indian Hindi-language television miniseries by Ajit Varma, set in the aftermath of the attacks and focusing on counterterrorism operations therein.
- State of Siege: 26/11 (2020), Indian Hindi-language web series released on ZEE5, showing the attacks from the perspective of NSG Commandos. It is based on the book Black Tornado: The Three Sieges of Mumbai 26/11 by journalist Sandeep Unnithan.
- Mumbai Diaries 26/11 (2021), Indian Hindi-language medical drama series on Amazon Prime Video. The series is directed by Nikhil Advani and Nikhil Gonsalves. It follows the staff of Bombay General Hospital during the night of the attacks.

=== Books ===
- Kasab: The Face of 26/11 (2010), by Rommel Rodrigues focuses on Ajmal Kasab, the sole terrorist who was caught. It is the basis of the aforementioned film The Attacks of 26/11.
- 26/11: RSS Ki Saazish? (2010; transl. 26/11: An RSS Conspiracy?), by journalist Aziz Burney forwarded a conspiracy theory that the Rashtriya Swayamsevak Sangh (RSS) was somehow linked to the attack. He launched the book in the presence of Indian National Congress leader Digvijaya Singh. Burney later apologised after the RSS pursued a legal case against him.
- The Siege: The Attack on the Taj (2013), non-fiction book by Cathy Scott-Clark and Adrian Levy. It is an account of the 2008 Mumbai attacks and was published by Penguin Books.
- Black Tornado: The Three Sieges of Mumbai 26/11 (2016), non-fiction book by Indian journalist Sandeep Unnnithan presenting a blow-by-blow account of the terrorist attack and how it was thwarted by India's security forces including the efforts of the Indian Navy's Marine Commandos as well as an ill-equipped yet valiant Mumbai Police. Its primary focus is on the 51 Special Action Group of National Security Guard, commanded by the decorated Indian Army Special Forces officer Brigadier Sunil Sheoran. The book delves into the reasons for the delayed arrival of the NSG, including home minister Shivraj Patil wanting to fly in the NSG aircraft and coming an hour late to board the plane which inturn delayed the NSG's arrival into the city and Southern Army Commander Lt. General. Noble Thamburaj touring the Taj Mahal Hotel with his wife while the NSG operation was still on. It was adapted into the aforementioned web series State of Siege: 26/11 (2020).
- Let Me Say It Now (2020), memoir by Indian police officer Rakesh Maria who was given the responsibility of investigating the attacks and personally interrogated Ajmal Kasab. He revealed the extent to which terrorists had gone to ensure their bodies would be mis-identified as Hindus, to lend credence to the conspiracy theory that the attack was the handiwork of Hindu extremists, and thus provide the Pakistani authorities with plausible deniability. According to Maria, Lashkar-e-Taiba wanted Kasab to be killed as a Bengaluru resident named "Samir Dinesh Chaudhari", with a "red (sacred) thread" tied around his wrist to portray the attack as a case of "Hindu terror", but their plan apparently did not succeed and the police nabbed Kasab. LeT had even given each terrorist a fake identity card listing an Indian address, to further strengthen the circumstantial narrative. If everything went according to plan, Kasab would have died as Chaudhari and the media would have blamed 'Hindu terrorists' for the attack. Kasab, in his confessional account, acknowledged this plot, as did David Headley, who corroborated this account by confirming that the sacred threads to be worn around the terrorists' wrists to identify them as Hindus, were procured from Mumbai's Siddhivinayak Temple.

== See also ==
- 1993 Bombay bombings
- 2006 Mumbai train bombings
- 2025 Pahalgam attack
- 2002 attack on American cultural centre in Kolkata
- 1993 Bowbazar bombing
- November 2015 Paris attacks
- Westgate shopping mall attack, Nairobi, Kenya
- Survivor registry

=== Lists ===
- List of massacres in India
- List of Islamist terrorist attacks
