= Sabina Sehgal Saikia =

Indian journalist and editor (1963–2008)

- Born: ca. 1963
- Died: 29 November 2008; The Taj Mahal Palace Hotel, Mumbai, India
- Cause of death: Terrorist attack
- Occupations: Food journalist, restaurant reviewer, and editor
- Employer: Delhi Times
- Known for: "Main Course"

Sabina Sehgal Saikia (c. 1963 – 29 November 2008), an Indian food journalist, restaurant reviewer, and editor for the Delhi Times in Delhi, India, was known for her column "Main Course." She was a victim of the 2008 Mumbai attacks on The Taj Mahal Palace Hotel in Mumbai.

== Personal ==
Sabina Sehgal Saikia is survived by her family, including her husband, Shantanu Saikia, and the couple's fourteen-year-old daughter and eleven-year-old son.

== Career ==
Saikia was the consulting editor of the Times of India where she started in the eighties, and a well-known food-critic. Sehgal later changed direction and covered the Enforcement Directorate and CBI. She had a column in the Delhi Times called, Main Course, that was very popular on the eating out life in India. The column would review one restaurant a week very critically and was said to have the power to make or break a restaurant. Saikia was considered India's leading food critic and restaurant reviewer.

== Death ==
In November 2008, 10 terrorists belonging to Lashkar-e-Taiba attacked a train station, a Jewish cultural center, and the Taj Mahal Palace Hotel, where Sehgal was attending a wedding. Approximately 170 people were massacred and the hotel was left burning for days while Indian authorities attempted to track down the terrorists whereabouts. Among the 170 killed there were 18 foreigners of US, German, Canadian, Israeli, Britain, Italian, Japanese, Chinese, Thai, Australian, and Singapore citizenship. Nine of the 10 terrorists were killed during the attacks. Ajmal Kasab, a 21-year-old Pakistani, was apprehended alive.

== Context ==
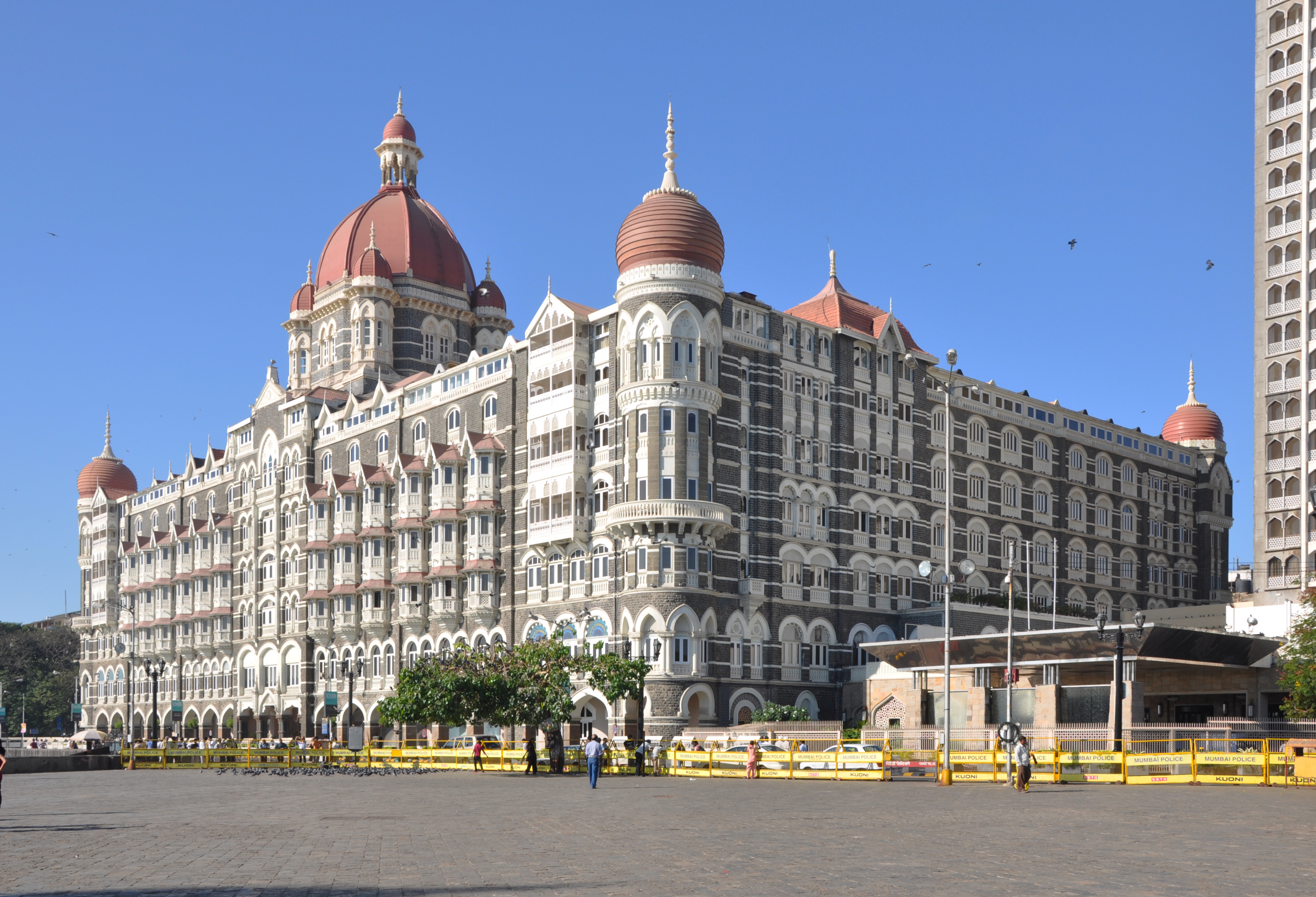
The Taj Mahal Palace was the site of Sehgal's murder.

This was India's worst terrorist event since 1993 Mumbai bombings where 257 were killed. The policemen at the scene were armed with pistols, while the militants had AK-47s and various explosives. These attacks convinced the Indian government to supply more police officers, better guns, and more training on how to handle different types of terrorist threats. George W. Bush, President of the United States, pledged the full support of the U.S in the apprehension of the terrorists.

== Impact ==
Sabina Sehgal Saikia was known for her reviews of food and restaurants. She began her career in journalism through her membership with ‘Spicmacay’, a global, non-political organization that promotes culture to young students. She became involved with the Times of India while working on the 150th anniversary. Sehgal later switched her direction as she became a writer who covered the CBI, also known as the Central Bureau of Investigation in India. This career path finally landed Sabina a position of editor of a popular Indian paper called ‘Delhi Times’. Her work with ‘Delhi Times’ is where Indian journalism began to recognize the talents she had for reviewing restaurants. Sabina's knack for analyzing the ambience, service, value for money and, food of restaurants made her a famous food critic that could determine the future of any eateries in India. When Sabina perished in the attacks on Mumbai her impact as a journalist was renowned from all over the capital even from people who did not know her personally.

== See also ==
- The Siege: The Attack on the Taj
