= Loumia Hiridjee =

French businesswoman (1962–2008)

Loumia Hiridjee (1 March 1962 – 26 November 2008) was a French businesswoman and co-founder of international lingerie brand Princesse Tam Tam. Hiridjee was born in Antananarivo, Madagascar, where she grew up in a family of wealthy Indian traders. In 1972 she joined her sister Sharma at a boarding school in France. In 1985 together they founded the Princesse Tam Tam brand (named after a 1935 film starring Josephine Baker). Hiridjee and her husband Mourad Amarsy were dining at the Oberoi Trident hotel in Mumbai, when they were shot and killed by armed attackers during the November 2008 Mumbai terrorist attacks.

== Biography ==
Loumia Hiridjee was born in Madagascar into a family of Muslim merchants who left Gujarat, a province of India, to settle in Madagascar. His grandfather sells dried fruit and his father runs a hardware store. In 1975, the political situation in Madagascar deteriorated and his family sent him to France at the age of 13 to attend a Catholic boarding school.

Fascinated by Paris and fashion, at the age of 22, in 1985, she launched her lingerie brand with her sister Shama Hiridjee and her husband Mourad Amarsy (also from Madagascar), naming it Princesse tam.tam in honor of Josephine Baker. Very quickly, his company took off, and in less than two years, numerous stores were opened.
