= Dawn Media Group =

Pakistani media company

Pakistan Herald Limited
- Logo of Dawn, the flagship publication of the Dawn Media Group
- Trade name: Dawn Media Group
- Native name: گروه میڈیا ڈان
- Type: Public company
- Industry: Media; publishing; broadcasting
- Predecessor: Dawn Group of Newspapers
- Founded: 1 February 1947; 79 years ago in Karachi, Sindh, Pakistan
- Founder: Muhammad Ali Jinnah, Yusuf Haroon (Haroon family)
- Headquarters: Haroon House, Dr. Ziauddin Ahmed Road, Karachi, Pakistan
- Number of locations: 3 offices (2018)
- Area served: Pakistan
- Key people: Amber Haroon Saigol (Chairperson); Hameed Haroon (CEO)
- Products: Dawn; Dawn News; CityFM89
- Brands: Dawn, Herald
- Subsidiaries: Pakistan Herald Publication (Private) Limited.; Haroon Sons (Private) Limited
- Website: pakistanheraldlimited.com

Pakistan Herald Limited, commonly known as the Dawn Media Group, is a Pakistani media company based in Karachi, Sindh. It publishes the Dawn newspaper and operates a TV channel, radio stations and websites. It is a listed member of All Pakistan Newspapers Society.

== Ownership ==
The Karachi based group is owned by the powerful Haroon and Saigol families. The CEO is Hameed Haroon and its chairman is Amber Haroon Saigol, daughter of the previous chairman Mahmoud Haroon and the 11th richest individual in Pakistan in 1993. A list of the top 10 richest families in Pakistan ranks Saigol family as the 8th richest and the Haroon's the 16th richest as of 2015.

== Structure ==
The Dawn Media Group covers three areas: print media (organised as a separate division called Dawn Group of Newspapers), broadcast media, and internet media:

- Print media
  - Dawn, its flagship daily English newspaper
  - The Star, Pakistan's most popular evening newspaper, now defunct.
  - Herald, a current affairs monthly magazine in English, now defunct.
  - Spider, a monthly Internet magazine, now defunct.
  - Aurora, a marketing and advertising bi-monthly magazine.
  - Young World, children's monthly magazine
- Broadcast media
  - Dawn News Urdu - 24-hour Urdu News Channel. (720p (16:9, HDTV)
  - Dawn Films - film distribution division which released the film 7 Din Mohabbat In.
  - City FM 89, a music radio channel
- Internet media
  - Dawn.com, a news website
  - DawnNews.Tv, news website in Urdu language
  - Teeli, digital media brand specialised in entertainment programming
  - Images.Dawn.com, culture and entertainment website
- Exhibitions
  - Dawn Education Expo, an annual education festival

== 'Dawn leaks' controversy ==
In 2016, one of the journalists working at the Dawn newspaper, Cyril Almeida, wrote an article that led to the controversy called Dawn leaks. Cyril had reported that during a National Security Council (NSC) meeting between the civilian leaders and the military leaders of Pakistan, some civilian leaders had warned the military leaders about the risk of Pakistan's growing diplomatic isolation due to lack of action against some Pakistani militant groups. Pakistan's military leadership was clearly upset over reports of alleged leaking of this classified information to a Pakistani journalist by some civilian leaders attending that NSC meeting. After the controversy would not die down, Minister of Information Pervaiz Rashid and Special Assistant to the Prime Minister Tariq Fatemi had to step down as a result of this controversy.

Dawn Media has also been in controversy surrounding the anti-India articles being published in volumes which resulted in the Indian Government banning the media group and its subsidiaries.

== Awards and recognition ==
- Hilal-i-Imtiaz Award by the President of Pakistan in 2011 for Hameed Haroon, the CEO of Dawn Media Group
