= The Siege: The Attack on the Taj =

2013 book by Cathy-Scott Clerk and Adrian Levy

- The cover picture of the book
- Author: Cathy Scott-Clark, Adrian Levy
- Language: English
- Subject: 2008 Mumbai attacks
- Genre: Thriller; Terrorism; Tragedy
- Published: Penguin Books in 2013
- Publication place: United States, India
- Media type: Print (paperback)
- Pages: 344 (Paperback)
- ISBN: 9780143420101

The Siege: The Attack on the Taj is a non-fiction book by Cathy Scott-Clark and Adrian Levy. It is an account of the 2008 attacks on The Taj Mahal Palace Hotel in Mumbai, India, during the night of 26 November 2008. It presents an insider view of the attacks based on extensive research by the authors. The book was first published by Penguin Books in 2013. It includes unreleased documents from the trial of Ajmal Kasab in India, including telephone conversations between the militants.

== Storyline ==
The book opens with a description of the day-to-day life of the rich and wealthy people of Mumbai. Sabina Sehgal Saikia, a highly regarded food critic working for the Times of India is present. A wedding reception is underway. Less than an hour after start of the party, the attackers bypass security and make their way into the Taj Mahal Palace Hotel. They immediately start shooting, and people hide under the dinner tables. The book is considerably more violent than other books in this category. The authors describe the militants as "landlocked boys from impoverished rural communities, who knew only about chickens and goats". The book claims that 26 different warnings had been issued by the R&AW, India's external intelligence agency, saying that the Taj, the Oberoi Trident and the Leopold Cafe might be targeted. The book includes descriptions of how people were ambushed as they tried to escape, and of the days of violence that followed the initial attacks. Interviews with many victims of the attack are included in the book.

== Critical review ==
The Siege has received mainly positive reviews from critics. Dwight Garner of the New York Times said:

They are not the most gifted writers you will ever come across. I spent the first 50 pages of The Siege tallying clichés, dangling modifiers and awkward phrases. These very quickly stopped—or stopped mattering, I'm not sure which. The story they present steamrolls finicky objections. It's a tragedy and a thriller with concussive human and political resonance. I read it in what felt like three blinks.

Firstpost reviewer Deepanjana Paul wrote:

The Siege is not a book you read for literary flair. It's written with the racing energy of a paperback thriller. There's just one significant difference from that popular genre: The Siege is all verified fact. Levy and Scott-Clark's reportage is outstanding, especially when you keep in mind how difficult it is to convince government departments like the National Security Guard to talk.
