= Crackers (2011 film) =

- First Look
- Directed by: Anil Goyal
- Written by: Priyank Dubey
- Produced by: Anil Goyal
- Music by: Dilip Sen
- Production company: FilmyBox
- Distributed by: RTM Technologies Pvt Ltd.
- Release date: 20 May 2011
- Country: India
- Language: Hindi

Crackers is a 2011 Indian Hindi-language stereoscopic 3D animation film directed by Anil Goyal, and written by Priyank Dubey. It is produced under the 'RTM Technologies Pvt Ltd' banner. The film was released direct-to-video on 20 May 2011.

== Plot ==
The first half of the movie has a comedic and romantic tone and takes place on a college campus, where a youth festival is in full swing. The second half deals with a terror attack on the campus and how the youth channelize their energy to counter and foil the attack. The movie revolves around four characters: Roxy (Anil Goyal), Gopu (Nikhil Dwivedi), and Kate (Smilie Suri), along with some comic characters from the film industry (Siraj Khan).
