= Andreas Liveras =

British businessman (1935–2008)

- Born: 1 April 1935; Kyrenia, Cyprus
- Died: 26 November 2008 (aged 73); Mumbai, India
- Known for: Business

Andreas Dionysiou Liveras (1 April 1935 – 26 November 2008) was a Cyprus-born British businessman, who rose from modest means to own and run successful bakery and yacht charter companies. He held British and Cypriot citizenship and was killed during Mumbai attacks of November 2008.

== Biography ==
Liveras was the eldest of eight children born to a shepherd in Kyrenia, Cyprus.

In 1963 Liveras immigrated with his family to the Kensington district of London, where he took a job selling pastries and driving a delivery truck at the Fleur de Lys bakery. He bought the company five years later, expanding it to become one of the largest frozen cake manufacturers in Europe, later moving the company to Newark-on-Trent in Nottinghamshire. The family built Fleur de Lys to become one of the largest cream-filled pastry producers in the UK. The company was sold to Express Dairies in 1985. He spent his gain on yachts, and small aircraft, starting Liveras Yachts, a superyacht company based in Monte Carlo that owns and rents superyachts for private charter. He was a pioneer of the industry and shaped the yachting industry that is seen today. Recognised by some in the superyacht world as a visionary who, coming into the industry as an owner quickly predicted the market for large capacity charter yachts as well as big custom designed onboard spas. A serial yacht owner who owned no less than 13 yachts in his lifetime.

Liveras was killed by terrorists on 26 November 2008 at the Taj Mahal Hotel during the 2008 Mumbai attacks, where he had taken his crew for a meal. That evening he also gave an interview to the British Broadcasting Corporation. As of his death he had four children, and was ranked 265th on The Sunday Times Rich List of the wealthiest people in the United Kingdom.
