= Young World (Lawrence Welk album) =

Studio album by Lawrence Welk and His Orchestra
- Released: 1962
- Genre: Easy listening
- Label: Dot

Young World is an album by Lawrence Welk and His Orchestra. It was released in 1962 on the Dot label (catalog no. DLP-3428). The album debuted on Billboard magazine's popular albums chart on June 9, 1962, reached the No. 6 spot, and remained on that chart for 12 weeks

== Track listing ==
Side 1

1. "Young World" (Jerry Fuller) [2:18]
2. "Love Letters" (Edward Heyman, Victor Young) [2:26]
3. "Secret Love" (Paul Francis Webster, Sammy Fain) [2:27]
4. "She's Got You" (Hank Cochran) [2:38]
5. "April Love" (Paul Francis Webster, Sammy Fain) [2:24]
6. "Don't Break the Heart That Loves You" (Benny Davis, Murray Mencher) [2:25]

Side 2

1. "Young at Heart" (Carolyn Leigh, Johnny Richards) [2:41]
2. "Anything That's Part of You" (Wrubel, Dixon) [2:12]
3. "Young Love" (Carole Joyner, Ric Cartey) [2:25]
4. "The Wonderful World Of The Young" (Bennett, Tepper) [2:12]
5. "Good Luck Charm" (Aaron Schroeder, Wally Gold) [2:06]
6. "Too Young" (Lippman, Dee) [2:38]
