= Adrian Levy =

Journalist

Adrian Levy (born 1965) is a journalist and film maker who writes for The Guardian.

Specialising in long-form investigative work, his pieces most often filed from Asia are published in The Guardian's Weekend magazine. Levy's work has also appeared in The Observer, The Sunday Times magazine, as well as being syndicated in the US, Australasia and across Europe.

Levy has also written non-fiction books. His fourth, entitled The Meadow, was published in paperback in 2013 by HarperCollins, in Britain. A fifth, The Siege, based around the attacks on Mumbai in November 2008, was published by Penguin in November 2013. Levy has also co-produced documentaries for the BBC and Channel 4, as well as broadcasting on BBC Radio 4 and the BBC World Service. Much of his work has been a collaboration with the journalist and author Cathy Scott-Clark.

In 2009, Levy and Scott-Clark were jointly made British Journalist of the Year at the One World Media awards, having been British Foreign Journalist of the Year in 2004. They were runners-up in the British Press Awards as Feature Writer of the Year in 2006 and 2009. In 2013, they produced Kashmir's Torture Trail, a film for C4 Dispatches, won the Amnesty Media awards "best documentary". A second film for Dispatches, Chinese Murder Mystery, was long-listed for the BAFTAS.

Adrian Levy appeared in 4 events at the 2017 Brisbane Writers Festival in Brisbane, Queensland, Australia.

== Biography ==
Levy trained on the Burton Daily Mail now known as the Burton Mail, working also for the Bolton Evening News and as a chief reporter on the Yorkshire Post before becoming a staff reporter on The Sunday Times in 1994. There he became deputy editor of its investigative Insight Section, before being posted, in 1998, as a foreign correspondent in South Asia. He left to join The Guardian in 2001.

== Myanmar ==
Filing stories from inside Myanmar and along its borders with China, India and Thailand since 1996, Levy's first book, published in 2001, was also centred in that country. Stone of Heaven, co-written with Scott-Clark, recounted historic attempts to reach the jadeite mines of Upper Burma, capped by their own successful journey to Hpakant, in Kachin State – the epicentre of the mines. The book described the plight of hundreds of thousands of bonded labourers, many of them paid in heroin, sharing syringes in dismal conditions, the gem pits becoming an epicentre for the country's HIV crisis. Serialised on BBC Radio 4, and in The Observer, The New York Times named it a 'book of the year'.

Having been black-listed from travelling to Myanmar, Levy and Scott-Clark were in 2001 invited back by the military government, in a trip sponsored by the UN, becoming the first journalists to be invited to attend a cabinet meeting after being held for seven days in Rangoon under house arrest. Writing and broadcasting regularly about the country in the years that followed, Levy also covered the uprisings of 2007 and 2008. However, he courted controversy shortly after by co-authoring a piece in The Guardian that questioned the efficacy of Aung San Suu Kyi, the jailed leader of the Burmese pro-democracy movement. Some Burmese campaigners attacked the piece with John Pilger describing it as a 'morally and journalistically disgraceful condemnation'. However, similar questions about Suu Kyi's efficacy were published in The New Yorker.

== Russia ==
Levy's second book investigated the fate of the Amber Room, said to be one of the world's most valuable missing art treasures that vanished during or after World War II. Levy published evidence said to be derived from formerly closed Soviet-era archives that showed the room had been accidentally destroyed by the Soviet Red Army. The book met with approval in the West where Peter Preston, former editor of The Guardian, described Levy and Scott-Clark as "two of our most formidable investigative journalists".

The Amber Room was a finalist in the Borders' Original Voices US book awards, becoming a national best seller in America. However, in Russia, where the Amber Room has been reproduced and is said to have been originally dismantled by the Nazis whose sympathisers concealed it in a secret hiding place, the book was denounced.

== Pakistan ==
Having worked in Pakistan from 1996 onwards, Levy's third book was set there: Deception: Pakistan, the United States, and the Global Nuclear Weapons Conspiracy. Published in 2007, it revealed how Abdul Qadeer Khan, a Pakistan metallurgist, stole nuclear secrets to build a bomb, before selling them around the world. However, Levy also revealed how the US had inadvertently armed countries President George W. Bush described as the axis of evil, by enabling Pakistan to arm itself while turning a blind eye as it sold on its know-how, Washington desiring to keep Islamabad as a key ally in Bush's war on terror.

Serialized by The Sunday Times, the book was a "pick of the year" by The Washington Post, and a finalist for the Duke of Westminster's Medal for Military Literature, presented by the Royal United Services Institute. Since then Levy together with Scott-Clark has produced for C4 Dispatches a documentary on the Islamic Republic's internal war on terror and its cost. They have also worked in the Swat Valley, for The Guardian, revealing the work of a specialist school, sponsored by the Pakistan military, as it attempts to rehabilitate would-be suicide bombers.

== Cambodia ==
Work in Cambodia included a study in The Guardian on secret land sales. While some critics countered that residents forced from their land gained compensation and in some cases new homes and occupations, most of the evidence presented pointed to Asian. American and European entrepreneurs using political contacts to acquire most of Cambodia's coastal lands, shunting entire communities from them, in a country where the destruction of all land entitlements by the Khmer Rouge made these sorts of forays impossible to rebuff.

== Bibliography ==
- The Stone of Heaven (ISBN 978-0-297-64574-0)
- The Amber Room (ISBN 978-1-84354-090-8)
- Deception: Pakistan, the United States, and the Global Nuclear Weapons Conspiracy (ISBN 978-1-84354-535-4)
- The Meadow: Terrorism, Kidnapping and Conspiracy in Paradise (ISBN 978-0-00-736817-4)
- The Siege: The Attack on the Taj (ISBN 9780670922567)
- The Exile: The Stunning Inside Story of Osama Bin Laden and Al Qaeda in Flight (ISBN 1408858762)
- The Forever Prisoner: The Full and Searing Account of the CIA’s Most Controversial Covert Program (ISBN 9780802158949)
