= Cathy Scott-Clark =

British journalist and author

Cathy Scott-Clark is a British journalist and author. She has worked with the Sunday Times and The Guardian. She has co-authored six books with Adrian Levy.

== Books ==
Seven books co-authored with Adrian Levy:

- The Stone of Heaven: Unearthing the Secret History of Imperial Green Jade. Back Bay Books (2003)
- The Amber Room: The Fate of the World's Greatest Lost Treasure, Viking. (2004)
- Deception: Pakistan, The United States and the Global Nuclear Weapons Conspiracy. Atlantic Books (2007)
- The Meadow: Kashmir 1995—Where the Terror Began (2012)
- The Siege: The Attack on the Taj, Penguin Books. (2013)
- The Exile: The Stunning Inside Story of Osama Bin Laden and Al Qaeda in Flight, Bloomsbury. (2017)
- Spy Stories: Inside the Secret World of the R.A.W. and the I.S.I. (2021)
- The Forever Prisoner: The Full and Searing Account of the CIA’s Most Controversial Covert Program (2022)
- Russia's Man of War: The Extraordinary Viktor Bout (2025)

== Awards ==
- Ramnath Goenka Award for Excellence in Journalism, 2012
- British Journalist of the Year 2009, One World Trust
