= Young World (magazine) =

Young World is a Pakistani children's magazine, published by Dawn. It has drawings, poems, and stories with illustrations that are contributed by children. It has reviews of books, movies, songs and websites. It also has News Update section in the end where news for children are present. There are small articles from comics like Archie etc. It also contains a note from the editor every week. Young World is delivered only on Saturday. It also contains new words in the Word Of The Week corner for children to improve their vocabulary.

== Contributions ==
The staff of Young World consists of Buda Da Great, Yungan, Profitt, Blak, and producer J-Mitch. They established the group in December 2006 and have been a group ever since.
