= 2008 attacks on Uttar Pradeshi and Bihari migrants in Maharashtra =

Attacks on migrants from Uttar Pradesh and Bihar

- Part of Violence in India
- Political map of India depicting its states
- Date: 3 February 2008 - 13 February 2008
- Location: Mumbai, Pune, Aurangabad, Beed, Nashik, Amravati, Jalna and Latur in Maharashtra

Parties
Maharashtra side	UP-Bihar workers side
Maharashtra Navnirman Sena	Samajwadi Party

Lead figures
Raj Thackeray	Asim Azmi

Casualties
- Deaths: at least 8
- Damage: ₹ 500 crores - ₹ 700 crores

Uttar Pradeshi and Bihari migrants in Maharashtra were attacked on 3 February 2008, due to violent clashes between workers of two political parties — the Maharashtra Navnirman Sena (MNS) and the Samajwadi Party (SP) took place at Dadar in Mumbai.

These clashes took place when the workers of the MNS (a splinter faction formed out of the Shiv Sena), tried to attack workers of the SP (the regional party based in Uttar Pradesh), who were proceeding to attend a rally organised by the United National Progressive Alliance (UNPA).

Defending his party's stand, MNS chief Raj Thackeray explained that the attack was a reaction to the: "provocative and unnecessary show of strength" and "uncontrolled political and cultural dadagiri (bullying) of Uttar Pradeshi and Bihari migrants and their leaders".

In the events leading to these clashes, Raj Thackeray made critical remarks, themed around language politics and regionalism, about migrants from the North Indian states of Uttar Pradesh and Bihar, accusing them of spoiling Maharashtrian culture and not mingling with them.

At political rallies held across the state, Thackeray questioned the loyalty of Bollywood actor Amitabh Bachchan towards Maharashtra, accusing him of showing "more interest" in Uttar Pradesh. He called the celebration of Chhath Puja by North Indian migrants a "drama" and a "show of arrogance".

On 13 February 2008, the state government, which was accused of showing reluctance to take immediate action, arrested Raj Thackeray and local SP leader Abu Asim Azmi on charges of instigation of violence and causing communal disturbance. Although released that same day, a gag order was imposed on both leaders to prevent them from making further inflammatory remarks.

Meanwhile, tensions in Maharashtra rose at the news of Raj's possible arrest, and his subsequent actual arrest, angered his supporters. Incidents of violence against North Indians and their property by MNS workers were reported in Mumbai, Pune, Aurangabad, Beed, Nashik, Amravati, Jalna, and Latur.

Nearly 25,000 North Indian workers fled Pune, and another 15,000 fled Nashik in the wake of the attacks. The exodus of workers caused an acute labour shortage, affecting local industries.

Analysts estimated financial losses of ₹500 crore (US$53 million)– ₹700 crore (US$75 million). Although the violence receded after the arrests of the two leaders, sporadic attacks were reported until May 2008. After months of lull, on 19 October 2008, MNS activists beat up North Indian candidates appearing for the all-India Railway Recruitment Board entrance exam in Mumbai. The incident led to Raj's arrest and fresh violence. Later on 28 October 2008 a labourer from Uttar Pradesh was lynched in a Mumbai commuter train.

The attacks evoked critical reactions from various parts of the country, particularly the Uttar Pradesh and Bihar political leadership. Even Bal Thackeray, Raj's estranged uncle and chief of the Shiv Sena, who formed his party in 1966 to raise the voice of Marathi manoos (Marathi people), discounted his nephew's criticism of Bachchan as "stupidity". In an editorial a month later in Saamna, the Shiv Sena's political mouthpiece, however, Bal Thackeray wrote that Biharis aggravated local populations wherever they went and were an "unwelcome lot" throughout the country. The media slated Bal's remarks as an attempt to recapture his party's sons-of-soil plank, being hijacked by Raj.

== Background ==
=== Raj Thackeray's resignation from Shiv Sena and the formation of MNS ===
Flag of Maharashtra Navnirman Sena

On 9 March 2006, Raj Thackeray, nephew of Bal Thackeray, quit the Shiv Sena and formed the Maharashtra Navnirman Sena (MNS) after being "sidelined" by the chief's son Uddhav. The Shiv Sainiks (Shiv Sena members, lit. means "Soldiers of Shivaji") who supported Raj's leadership, in contrast to his cousin Uddhav, joined the MNS. The party was founded on the ideology of being the benefactor of the local Marathi Manoos (Marathi people), an ideology that the party members felt the Shiv Sena had abandoned. Keeping in line with this, Raj has repeatedly demanded special job reservations for locals. A critic of the influx of migrants into the state, especially Uttar Bhartiyas (literally meaning "North Indians") predominantly from Uttar Pradesh and Bihar, he has blamed the large-scale immigration of people from these economically backward states for causing a shortage of jobs for Maharashtrians.

=== Shiv Sena's move to appease migrants ===
The Times of India summarised the cause of MNS's attacks—"There's a method in MNS's madness in attacking north Indians in Mumbai though, howsoever flawed it might be. Raj believes his cousin and Shiv Sena leader Uddhav Thackeray has been wooing the people from Bihar and UP—through a campaign he began back in 2005 with the inclusive call of Mee Mumbaikar—as his party's vote-bank. Uddhav's growing popularity with North Indians had been rankling Raj, who is losing ground and political relevance as evident in the MNS's performance in the last municipal elections."

=== Raj's criticism of Amitabh Bachchan ===
In January 2008, targeting Mumbai-resident Amitabh Bachchan at political rallies, Raj asserted that the actor was "more interested" in his native state Uttar Pradesh than Maharashtra. He expressed his disapproval of Amitabh's inaugurating a girls' school named after his daughter-in-law, actress Aishwarya Rai Bachchan, at Barabanki in Uttar Pradesh, rather than in Maharashtra. Bachchan was also criticised for choosing to run elections from his native state. On 2 February at a party function at Dharavi in Mumbai, Raj said, "Though he [Amitabh] has become a star in Mumbai, his interest is in Uttar Pradesh. That is why he was trying to be an ambassador of UP rather than Maharashtra. That is why though he achieved everything in Mumbai, when it came to elections, Amitabh chose Uttar Pradesh".

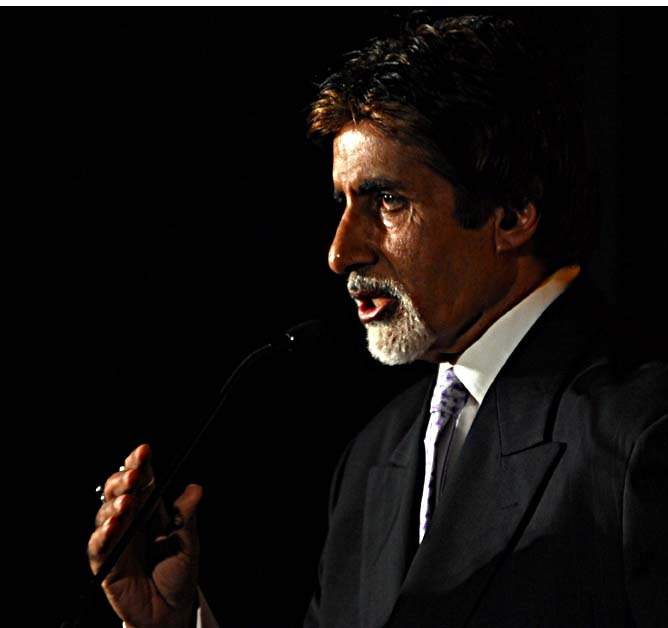
Amitabh Bachchan

Responding to Raj's accusations, the actor's wife and an SP MP Jaya Bachchan said that they (Bachchans) were willing to start a school in Mumbai, provided the MNS leader donated the land to build it. She told the media, "I heard that Raj Thackeray owns huge properties in Maharashtra, in Mumbai at Kohinoor Mills. If he is willing to donate land, we can start a school in the name of Aishwarya here". Amitabh, however, abstained from commenting on the issue.

Bal Thackeray refuted the allegations, saying, "Amitabh Bachchan is an open-minded person, he has great love for Maharashtra, and this is evident on many occasions. The actor has often said that Maharashtra and specially Mumbai has given him great fame and affection. He has also said that what he is today is because of the love people have given him. The people of Mumbai have always acknowledged him as an artiste. It was utter foolishness to make these parochial allegations against him. Amitabh is a global superstar. People all over the world respect him. This cannot be forgotten by anyone. Amitabh should ignore these silly accusations and concentrate on his acting". According to some reports, Raj's censure of Amitabh, whom he supposedly admires, stemmed from his disappointment of not being invited to the wedding of Amitabh's son, Abhishek, despite invitations to his estranged uncle Bal and cousin Uddhav.

On 23 March, Amitabh finally spoke out in an interview with a local tabloid, saying, "Random charges are random; they do not deserve the kind of attention you wish me to give". Later on 28 March at a press conference for the International Indian Film Academy, when asked what his take was on the anti-migrant issue, Amitabh said that it is one's fundamental right to live anywhere in the country and the constitution entitles so. He also stated that he was not affected by Raj's comments.

=== Raj's remarks on Chhath Puja and migrants ===
In his party speeches, Raj had also reproached North Indian migrants on the celebration of Chhath Puja, a festival popular in Bihar, calling it a "drama" and a "show of arrogance". He demanded that they must only celebrate Maharashtrian festivals. A petition was filed in the Patna civil court on 8 February against him for his remarks over Chhath Puja. His statements drew flak from leaders of Bihar, especially the Indian Railways Minister and former Chief Minister of Bihar, Lalu Prasad Yadav, who challenged that he would come to Mumbai and perform Chhath Puja in front of Raj's house, also ridiculed Raj saying, "He [Raj] is a child in politics". The Navnirman Sena leader accused migrants of swamping Maharashtra, India's most industrialised state, in search of jobs.

The MNS chief had also accused migrants of disrespecting the local culture. On 9 February, expressing his stance on newer migrants settling in Mumbai, Raj said, "New immigrants to the city should be denied entry into the city, while those already staying here should show respect to the Marathi 'manoos' and his culture".

=== Clashes between MNS and SP workers ===
On 3 February 2008, MNS and SP workers indulged in street fighting after the former tried to attack the latter, who were proceeding to Shivaji Park, Dadar, in Mumbai to attend a rally organised by the United National Progressive Alliance (UNPA), the ruling coalition party of India, of which the SP is a member. The rally was to be addressed by former Uttar Pradesh Chief Minister Mulayam Singh Yadav and other prominent members of the UNPA and SP. Police arrested 73 MNS and 19 SP workers after these clashes on charges of rioting.

Raj justified his party's stand as a response to—"provocative and unnecessary show of strength" and "uncontrolled political and cultural dadagiri of the Uttar Pradesh and Bihar migrants and their leaders"—and questioned, "Do political movements need to obey the law?" On 10 February at a press conference, he issued a statement saying, "What happened in Mumbai in the past one week was only a reaction and if leaders of Uttar Pradesh and Bihar try to demonstrate their strength here, such reactions would recur".

After the clashes, SP approached the Election Commission demanding de-registration of MNS. SP general secretary whose press conference near Azad Maidan was disrupted by MNS activists on 3 February, Amar Singh petitioned the Commission requesting action against the MNS and its leaders for issuing "veiled as well as open threats" against non-Maharashtrians. However, Mumbai police dismissed a complaint of "criminal intimidation" filed against Raj by Singh as 'false and malicious'. In his complaint filed at Azad Maidan police station, Singh had alleged that sloganeering MNS men had threatened him by using Thackeray's name while being whisked away by security personnel from the venue.

== Attacks ==
=== February ===
On 3 February, immediately after clashes with SP, MNS workers assaulted North Indian taxi drivers and vandalised their vehicles in Dadar, Mumbai. The police faced strong criticism for remaining mute spectators as MNS workers assaulted North Indians. A departmental inquiry was instituted against the police inaction. Inspector Motiram Kadam and sub-inspector Deepak Pawar, who were assigned duty at Dadar, were suspended for dereliction of duty. Later, over 25 MNS workers were arrested on charges of rioting. In the night, 150 suspected MNS activists ransacked Pratap talkies in Thane, pulled out the print of the Bhojpuri film "Saiyan se Solah Singaar" and burned it because Bhojpuri is the regional language spoken in the states of Uttar Pradesh and Bihar. The rioters also damaged the theatre and destroyed the seats. A similar incident was reported in Nashik.

The next day in Mumbai, two motorcycle-borne MNS supporters hurled bottles at Amitabh Bachchan's bungalow at Juhu. A group of MNS workers barged inside the booking office of the Grant Road railway station, damaged the booking office windows and tore off posters of a newly released Bhojpuri film put up there. Party workers resorted to stone throwing in some parts of Kandivli, a North-Mumbai suburb that has a sizeable North Indian lower middle-class population. In the Central-Mumbai suburb of Bandra, a clash ensued when MNS workers tried to plant party flags at an open market dominated by North Indians.

The offices of Bhojpuri actor Manoj Tiwari and Bihari Indian National Congress leader Sanjay Nirupam were stoned by MNS supporters on 5 February. Two days later, a group of 20 to 25 MNS activists forced themselves into the Central Mumbai office of the Bombay Taximen's Union, where they assaulted office staff and damaged property. In response to the attack, the 55,000-strong Union immediately called for a flash strike. The strike was then called off after R. R. Patil, the Home Minister of Maharashtra, assured the Union of justice and safety. An advocate named Arvind Shukla filed a Public Interest Litigation (PIL) seeking directions to the Election Commission to de-recognise MNS in view of its "anti-national activities".

On 8 February, re-invoking the issue of Marathi pride, Maharashtra Navnirman Sena chief Raj Thackeray on hit out at North Indians again, in a special article titled "Majhi bhumika, majha ladha" (My role, my fight) written by him in the Marathi daily Maharashtra Times, Thackeray said, "Even if the whole world opposes my stand, I and my party will continue the struggle to protect Marathi culture, Maharashtrian people and will trample the goondaism of Uttar Pradesh and Bihar. At this juncture, I feel like asking the Maharashtrian people that if I am voicing your true emotion, then why are you sitting on the fence. Come join me in this struggle."

On 12 February, MNS workers attacked vendors and shopkeepers from North India in various parts of Maharashtra and destroyed government property to vent their anger against the reported move to arrest Raj. Sporadic violence was reported in Beed and Aurangabad. State-run buses in these areas were stone-pelted, resulting in the arrest of several MNS workers. In Nashik, MNS workers vandalised several shops belonging to North Indians, forcing other shops and business establishments to close down. One shopkeeper was severely beaten and was admitted to Nashik General Hospital. Banks and schools promptly closed after these incidents. Stone pelting by angry mobs was also reported from the city's Shalimar and Bytco squares, and the Satpur and Ambad industrial areas remained closed. Nashik police detained 26 MNS workers after the violence. Six municipal cooperators were also put under preventive arrest. Additional police pickets were deployed in various parts of the city, including Shalimar and Ambad Chowk, Satpur, Nashik Road, the MNS head office at Mumbai Naka and some of the city suburbs. In Pune, MNS workers pelted stones on state-run buses and attacked a few shop owners in Pune's Laxmi Road area, prompting shops to shut down to avoid similar attacks.

The Mumbai Police announced its move to put Raj under their custody on 13 February, which created an upsurge of violence in the state and led to two deaths. Attacks on North Indians were reported from Mumbai, Pune, Jalna, Beed, Aurangabad and Latur. Shops, offices and other business establishments were shut down in different parts of Mumbai, as MNS workers threatened violence in case their leader was arrested. Central Mumbai localities were most affected, especially around Dadar and Shivaji Park, the strongholds of both the MNS and the Shiv Sena. The police blocked roads in front of the residence of Raj in the Shivaji Park area. A civic activist named James John was assaulted by suspected MNS workers while he was attempting to photograph them forcing shop owners to down shutters in JB Nagar, Andheri. John suffered two rib fractures and bruises on his lungs. In Nashik, an employee of the Hindustan Aeronautics Limited, a Maharashtrian, died during a stone pelting on state-run buses by MNS supporters. A migrant from Bihar, who was a security guard with a private company at Igatpuri in Nashik district, was killed by a mob.

In Mumbai and Aurangabad, police rounded up more than 400 MNS workers. In Pune and Pimpri-Chinchwad, MNS workers went on a rampage following the arrest of Raj, smashing windows and windscreens of eleven state buses. Thirteen rioters were arrested. They also chopped off both hands of a Bihari hawker sleeping on the streets. He was severely beaten until he fell unconscious. When he gained consciousness the following day, he found himself in a hospital with both hands amputated. The injured, mainly hawkers, were treated at the Nashik Civil Hospital after they were beaten. Shops along Nashik Road closed down after the incident. Incidents of stone pelting on state-run buses were reported from the Nashik Road, Ambad, Raviwar Peth, and Gangapur areas. Bus services were severely curtailed and diverted via Nipani. In Amrawati, MNS workers blocked roads and pelted stones at buses, damaging several vehicles in the process. Though contingents of the Rapid Action Force (RAF) and the Central Industrial Security Force (CISF) were deployed in many parts of the state, the police could not control violence by the MNS who adopted hit-and-run methods of attack. More than 200 activists of the MNS were arrested across Nashik. Many activists went underground and coordinated with party activists from undisclosed locations.

=== March–May ===
The attacks simmered down after mid-February due to the arrest and imposition of a gag order on Raj. Isolated cases of attacks, however, were reported until April 2008. On 22 March, six North Indians were beaten up by a group of Holi revelers, suspected to be MNS workers, in Santa Cruz, Mumbai. On the same day, a shop owned by a North Indian was ransacked by a group of 10 – 15 drunken men, who pelted stones and beat his children because they had refused to provide free food. On 29 March, motorcycle-borne assailants damaged at least five taxis owned by North Indians in Central Mumbai. Four people were arrested. Four labourers travelling on the Konkan Kanya Express from Thane to Margao in search of jobs were beaten and plundered by some men in Raigad district after being identified as North Indians on 1 April. Then on 30 May, a group of North Indians was injured when a mob of approximately 800 MNS activists attacked them at a meeting organised by the SP and some other North Indians fronts. Five North Indians were critically injured in the attack, and the police arrested 35 MNS activists after the incident.

=== October ===
After months of lull in the anti-North Indian offensive, on 19 October 2008, MNS activists beat up North Indian candidates appearing for the All-India Railway Recruitment Board entrance exam for the Western region in Mumbai. The attack invoked a quick reaction from Lalu Prasad Yadav and his cabinet colleague Ram Vilas Paswan, who too hails from Bihar. Chief Minister of Bihar Nitish Kumar, on the other hand, spoke to his Maharashtra counterpart Vilasrao Deshmukh and urged him to provide protection to the migrants from Bihar. Lalu demanded a ban on the MNS, and described its chief Raj Thackeray as a "mental case".

Bihar witnessed violent protest after death of Pawan Mahto, a resident of Bara-Khurd village in Nalanda district, in anticipation that he died after being assaulted by MNS activists. However, Government Railway Police (GRP) clarified, based on the CCTV footage, that Pawan had died due to an accident at Andheri station after slipping at a platform.

The then-Chief Minister of Maharashtra Vilasrao Deshmukh admitted that his government was responsible for failure in preventing the attacks by MNS on north Indian candidates at Railways examination centres and ordered a probe into the incident, which will also enquire into why the job advertisements where not given in Marathi newspapers. "What has happened is not good. Such incidents take place because of loopholes in the law. One can't hold only the Home Ministry responsible for it, it is (entire) government's responsibility. Such incidents are affecting the image of the state and I have instructed the DGP to take stern action," Deshmukh said. However, Nationalist Congress Party (NCP) leader Narayan Rane, wrote a piece on 23 October 2008, issue of 'Prahar', in a city newspaper he owns, pleading that Marathis should get their legitimate share in the central government sector. The Times of India noted, the essay indicates that Rane continues to have a soft spot for MNS chief Raj Thackeray – the two were close friends when Rane was in the Sena. Stating that the Marathis were getting a raw deal in central government jobs such as income tax and the railways, Rane said it was perplexing that of 54,000, only 54 Marathis were summoned for the railway recruitment exams. The railways must give Marathis their legitimate share in employment, Rane said.

On 20 October 2008, Thackeray was arrested in Ratnagiri after Mumbai Police had received a non-bailable warrant issued by a Jamshedpur court against the MNS chief. Raj's arrest ignited violence by his supporters in large parts of the city forcing it to shut down. Irate supporters went on the rampage torching public transport and telling office goers to return home. Many shops and commercial establishments, especially those run or managed by non-Maharashtrians, chose not to open at all to avoid trouble. Raj, whose MNS workers Sunday attacked non-Maharashtrians appearing for the railway board examination, was brought from Ratnagiri, about 250 km from here, to be produced at the Bandra court, where he was summoned for.

There was mayhem outside the court premises with large crowds gathering around restively and camera crews waiting to capture the trouble. In some places, buses, taxis and autorickshaws were set on fire, in others areas public transport just stayed off the roads. The office of the state Congress spokesperson Sanjay Nirupam was also vandalized.

A North Indian shopkeeper was killed in Bhandup, Mumbai after he refused to shut down his shop when MNS activists protesting Raj's arrest forced him to do so. Four persons were killed and another seriously injured in a village near Kalyan. Deputy Commissioner of Police (rural) Sanjay Shintre said two North Indians, a member of the Agri community and an MNS worker were killed in a clash between the two communities in Pisawali, 10 kms from Kalyan. Earlier, curfew had been imposed in the entire Kalyan area. The situation in Kalyan worsened in the evening as Raj was driven there to a police station lock-up where he was to spend the night before being presented in a court on 22 October. Five outdoor broadcast vans belonging to media houses were damaged by MNS supporters. A cameraman from ETV was injured and had to be admitted to a private hospital. One Kalyan-Dombivli municipal transport bus was set on fire while five bikes were reduced to ashes. Transport services across Kalyan were paralysed. A jewellery shop was also ransacked by MNS supporters. In all one hundred and twenty-five cases of arson, rioting and stone pelting were registered across the state, including in Pune and Marathwada, by early evening, and 2,085 people were arrested, State Director General of Police (DGP) A N Roy said.

As news about the arrest spread, there was violence in other parts of Maharashtra too. Sporadic incidents of stone pelting at municipal and private buses were reported in the rest of Maharashtra following the arrest of MNS chief Raj Thackeray in Ratnagiri. In Kothrud area, some alleged MNS activists damaged a company's bus that was taking its employees to workplace. Few Pune Municipal Transport (PMT) buses were stoned by miscreants, police said. Meanwhile, police have picked up around 100 MNS activists, including some corporators as a preventive measure. In Nashik, MNS activists set ablaze a truck near PWD minister Chhagan Bhujbal's farm and also damaged another truck at Vilholi-Phata area, police said. Incidents of stone pelting on Maharashtra State Road Transport Corporation (MSCRT) buses and other vehicles were reported in some areas, they said, adding vehicular traffic on the busy Mumbai-Agra-national highway was disrupted following the protest. Police rounded up 70 MNS activists in Nashik incidents and security was tightened in the city. In Solapur, incidents of stone pelting on state transport buses were also reported. In Nagpur MNS party leaders claimed to have damaged several MSCRT buses.

Angry students in various parts of Bihar damaged railway property and disrupted train traffic, as a protest. The police said the protesters targeted Patna, Jehanabad, Barh, Khusropur, Sasaram and Purnia railway stations in the morning. The protesting students reportedly set afire two AC bogies of an express train at Barh railway station. They ransacked Jehanabad, Barh, Purnia and Sasaram. According to the railway police, at least 10 students were detained in the morning and extra security was deployed to control the situation. A 10-year-old boy was killed when police opened fire on protesters. The child was hit by a stray bullet and died at the scene after police in Rohtas district fired on a mob attacking a train station. A group of 25 people pelted stones on the Maharashtra Bhawan in Khalasi Line, Kanpur, Uttar Pradesh. Constructed in 1928, the building is owned by the lone trust run by Marathis in Kanpur.

=== January–May 2009 ===
On 26 January 2009, MNS activists attacked North Indian residents of Satpur near Nashik who were paying tribute to the terrorist attacks on Mumbai in 2008 and also celebrating 'Uttar Pradesh Din' (Uttar Pradesh Day) through cultural programmes. Eight of them were arrested. In May 2009, alleged MNS workers tried to disrupt Patna-born actress Neetu Chandra's intimate photoshoot with a model in Mumbai, claiming that it promoted lesbianism and chanting "Jai Maharashtra."

== Arrests of Raj Thackeray and Abu Asim Azmi ==
Raj Thackeray and SP leader Abu Asim Azmi were booked under Indian Penal Code sections 153 (wantonly giving provocation with intent to cause riot), 153 A (promoting enmity between groups on the basis of place of birth, residence, etc.) and 153 B (imputations, assertions prejudicial to national integration) on 11 February. The police also applied section 144 of the Criminal Procedure Code to both politicians and warned them not to hold any press conferences or rallies in the next seven days. On 13 February, however, police arrested both the leaders. Later that day, a local court granted Raj conditional bail and ordered him not to make any speeches that would inflame public tension. He obtained a release after furnishing a personal bond of Rs. 15,000. Azmi was arrested and taken to the Bhoiwada court in South Central Mumbai and was released on surety of Rs. 10,000.

Raj appealed before the court against the gag order imposed on him, stating that he had to move around different places in Maharashtra for propounding the philosophy of his party and that such an order was an infringement of his 'fundamental rights'. On 22 February, the court dismissed his appeal to re-track the extension of the gag order passed against him, following which MNS started a signature campaign to get support against the gag order. According to MNS, Maharashtrian actors Nana Patekar and Shreyas Talpade had shown support in opposing the gag order, along with actors Salman Khan and Suneil Shetty. Salman Khan and Suneil Shetty, however, later denied the MNS's claim. This move by MNS prompted the police to serve a show cause notice to Raj, asking him why the gag order should not be extended.

Over 1,800 activists were put under arrest for substantive offences and as a preventive measure since violence had erupted on the streets of Mumbai on 13 February, according to the Joint Commissioner of Mumbai Police (Law and Order), K. L. Prasad.

=== Expression of displeasure by the Supreme Court ===
On 22 February, while hearing two Public Interest Litigations, the Supreme Court of India termed the attacks on North Indians in Mumbai by Maharashtra Navnirman Sena activists as "a dangerous trend". The three-judge bench comprising Chief Justice K G Balakrishnan, and Justices R V Ravindran and Markandey Katju observed,

"It [attack on North Indians] is a very dangerous tendency. What is happening there [Mumbai], we can understand. These [who were attacked] are innocent people. We understand the situation there [in Maharashtra] and what is happening. This is one country and we will not accept son-of-soil theory. We will not permit Balkanisation of this country."

The court passed the judgement while hearing two Public Interest Litigations on related issues. While the first, filed by advocate Arvind Shukla, had sought direction to the Election Commission to derecognise Mr Raj Thackeray's MNS for his controversial remarks against North Indians, the other one, filed by RU Upadhyay, sought protection for the North Indians in Maharashtra and compensation to those who had suffered from the attacks. The court, however, refused to pass any direction on the grounds that the issue was related to the aspect of law and order, and it thus directed the petitioners to have faith in the Bombay High Court and seek further hearing there.

In another apparent rebuff to Raj Thackeray, the Supreme Court asserted that every Indian has the right to settle anywhere in the country. A bench consisting of Justices H K Sema and Markandey Katju remarked,

"India is not an association or confederation of states, it is a union of state and there is only one nationality that is Indian. Hence every Indian has a right to go anywhere in India, to settle anywhere, and work and do business of his choice in any part of India peacefully."

The apex court made the observation while upholding the Ahmedabad Municipal Corporation's move to ban the sale of meat in the town during the nine-day "Paryushan festival" observed by the Jain community.

== Exodus of North Indians from Maharashtra ==
=== Nashik ===
The news of Raj's possible arrest provoked a heightened attack on the North Indians in the industrial town of Nashik in Maharashtra, Raj's political stronghold. North Indians left the city by buses, trains and private vehicles. Railway officials at Nashik station said that this was the largest crowd using the railroad since the Sinhasta Kumbha Mela in 2003–2004. It was perhaps one of the largest exoduses from a single district in the country ever. Chhagan Bhujbal, Nashik's guardian minister, reported that 15,000 migrant workers had left the city in the aftermath of the violence against North Indians.

=== Pune ===
In Pune, an estimated 25,000 workers left the city in the wake of the attacks, according to government officials. Pune's District Guardian Minister Ajit Pawar and Collector Prabhakar Deshmukh held meetings of various people's representatives to stop the mass departure. They were joined by local Congress MP Suresh Kalmadi, who picketed at Pune railway station to allay fears of those boarding the trains with their family members, carrying their meager belongings.

=== Effects on local industries ===
Local industries in Nashik, especially those located in the Ambad Maharashtra Industrial Development Corporation area, were affected due to the large-scale departure of migrant workers. According to a report, 40 percent small and medium industries in the Ambad industrial area had been closed down due to the migration. Though the local industries at Nashik are ancillary units, they provide material to big industries such as Mahindra and Mahindra and Crompton Greaves. Losses resulting from the exodus were estimated to be ₹5–7 billion (₹500–700 crore).

In Pune, where the construction industry was badly hit, some local organisations, working for porters, construction workers and casual labourers, tried to stop the exodus. These organisations set up a National Integration Committee (NIC) and charted out confidence-building measures among the migrants in the city. One of the resolutions passed at the meeting was to encourage participation of the North Indians in all festivities in the near future. In fact, ninety percent of the labour force in Pune consists of migrants; 60 percent of these come from Bihar and UP. It was also feared that the stoppage of construction activities would adversely affect the plans of hosting certain events of the 2008 Commonwealth Youth Games to be held in the city.

On 8 September 2008, Infosys Technologies announced that 3,000 employee positions had been shifted from Pune to Chennai, due to construction delays caused earlier that year by the attacks on North Indian construction workers.

== Political reactions ==
The attacks evoked severe responses from political parties and their leaders, particularly of Uttar Pradesh and Bihar. Mayawati, the chief minister of Uttar Pradesh, accused the Congress-ruled Maharashtra government of failing to prevent the attacks. She demanded centre intervention to protect the lives and properties of North Indians in the state. Bihar chief minister Nitish Kumar said "Mumbai ujad jayega (Mumbai will be ruined)". In response to the attacks on taxi drivers and vendors, he added, "What will happen in Mumbai if taxis go off the roads? Mumbai will come to a standstill". Lalu Prasad Yadav on 5 February 2008, took up the issue of attacks on North Indians with Prime Minister Manmohan Singh and demanded action against those involved in them. Commenting on Raj Thackeray, Lalu Prasad said, "He is desperate and such type of leader will never be successful in the country. The Government should take action against him and his supporters".

In the national capital, Delhi, political and social organisations launched street protests and burnt Raj's effigy, while members of the Bharatiya Janata Party (BJP)'s Poorvanchal cell held a demonstration demanding that the dismissal of the Maharashtra government. In Allahabad, SP workers tried to obstruct the movement of trains in protest. In Uttar Pradesh's capital, Lucknow, Nationalist Congress Party activists burnt an effigy of Raj. In Patna, capital of Bihar, RJD's youth wing staged a demonstration against Raj and the MNS. Thackeray's effigies were burnt also in Jamshedpur in the state of Jharkhand.

The then-Chief Minister of Maharashtra Vilasrao Deshmukh condemned Raj's actions and promised to protect migrants from Uttar Pradesh and Bihar and at the same time warned SP from hijacking the situation for political mileage. The Nationalist Congress Party, a key member of the ruling coalition in Maharashtra, also criticised Raj Thackeray and said the campaign was a "cheap publicity stunt". On 6 February 2008 about 200 MNS party workers quit their party and re-joined Shiv Sena, to protest against the MNS's anti-North Indian agenda.

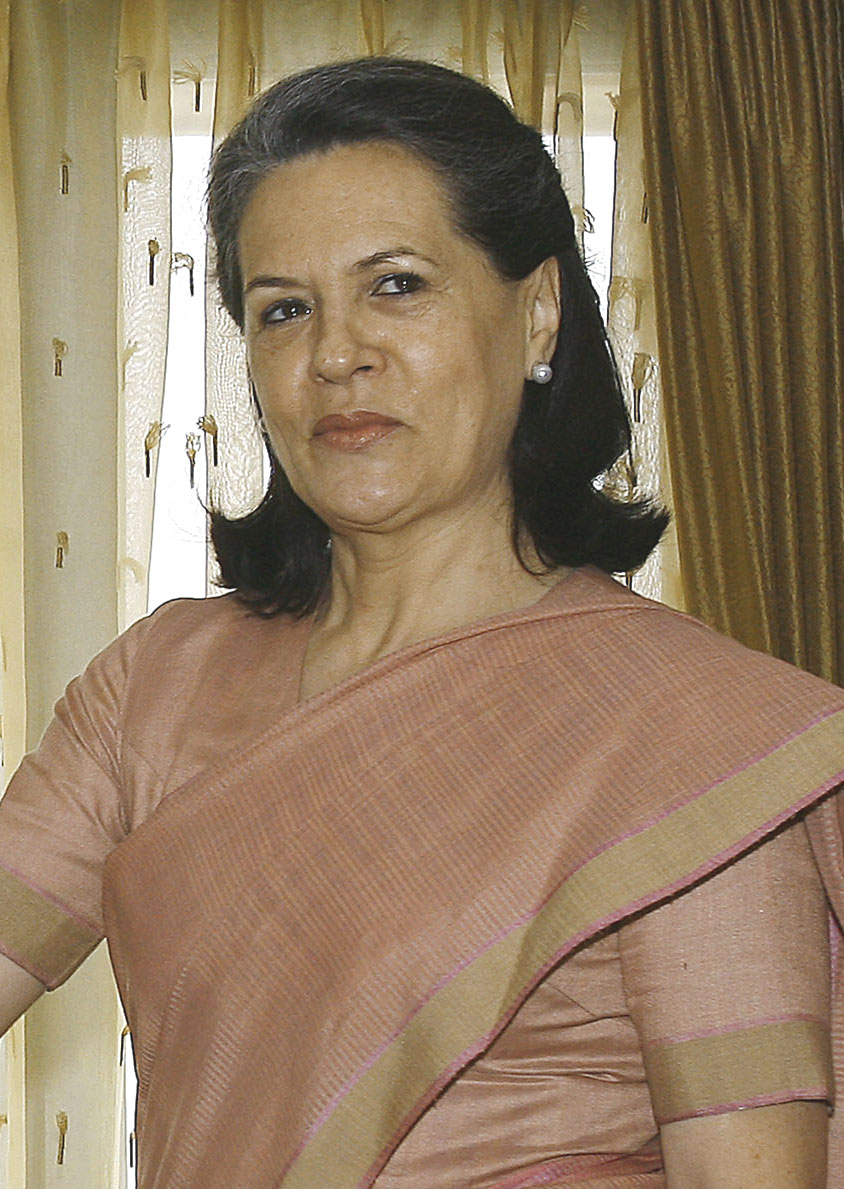
At a rally in Delhi, Congress President Sonia Gandhi announced that there should be no leniency towards those stoking regional and communal passions.

On 9 March, Congress President Sonia Gandhi declared that there should be no leniency towards those stoking regional and communal passions. "Unity and integrity are the basic conditions for progress of the nation and to fight terrorism. There should be no leniency towards those who seek to discriminate on the basis of religion and region," Sonia Gandhi said. She asserted that the country belongs to all with equal rights to it, and that it is the responsibility of all to ensure security of life and property of every citizen in any part of the country.

Leader of the Opposition in the Lok Sabha, Lal Krishna Advani of the Bharatiya Janata Party (BJP) criticising the attacks commented, "No political party should say or do anything that weakens the country's unity or undermines the Constitution". BJP spokesperson Prakash Javadekar alleged that the Congress State government deliberately delayed taking any action when the attacks on North Indians began in Mumbai. He said that he suspected Congress had a strategy to divide Maharashtrian and non-Maharashtrian votes, by creating a feeling of insecurity among non-Maharashtrians in the hope that they would vote for the Congress. He blamed the party for trying to divert people's attention from more critical problems that Maharashtra faces, such as the agrarian crisis and load shedding. He added, "India is one and every Indian has a right to settle down and work in any part of the country".

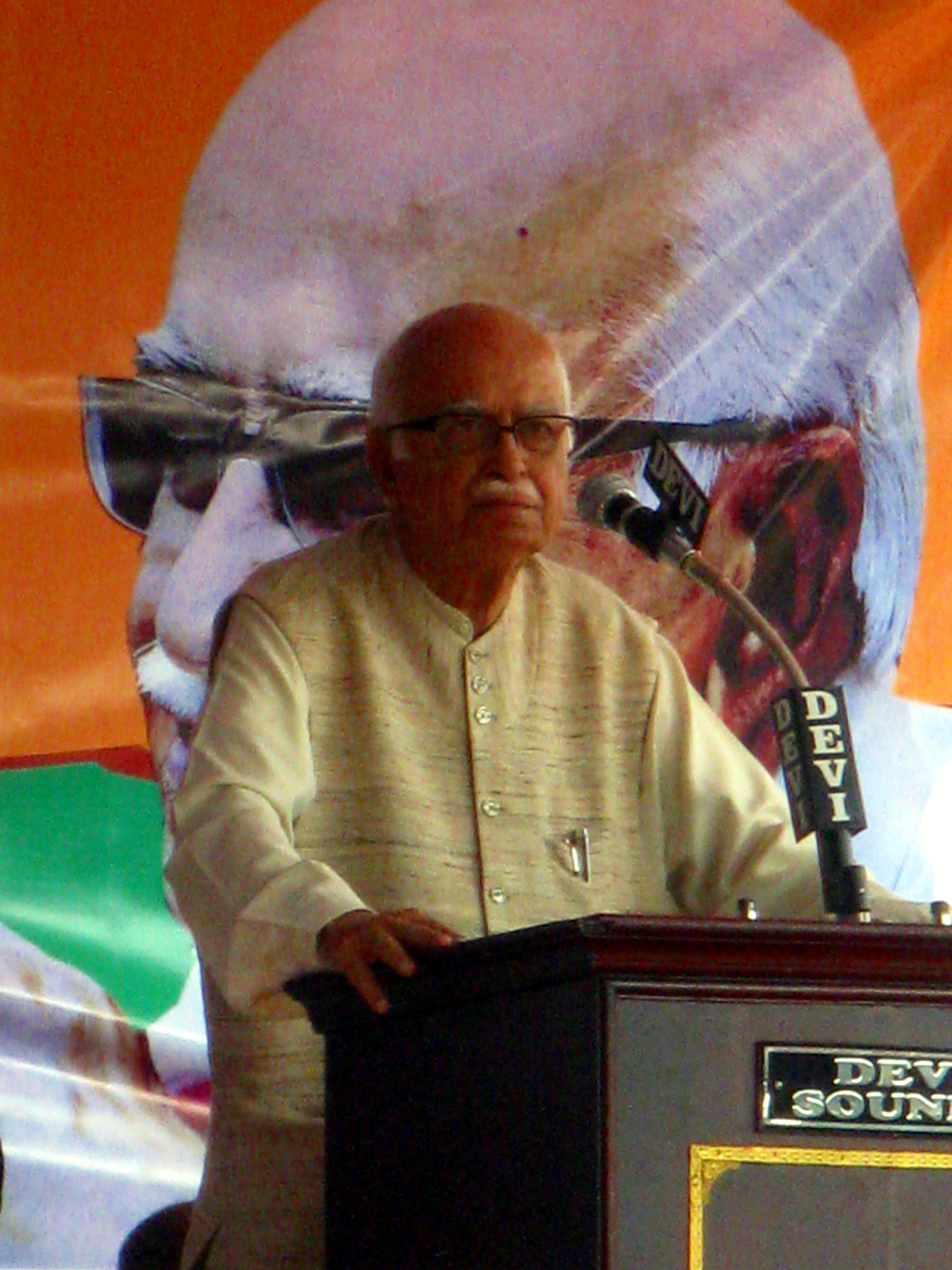
L.K. Advani said India is one and every Indian has a right to settle down and work in any part of the country

The Communist Party of India (CPI) demanded stringent action against those inciting violence and asked democratic forces to launch a united struggle against such elements. The party also accused the media, particularly the electronic media, of encouraging anti-national and parochial forces by giving them "undue publicity". According to a resolution adopted at its 20th national Congress at Hyderabad, no adequate action was against those who indulge in chauvinistic slogans and perpetuate hooliganism, and the ruling Congress-led coalition and the opposition BJP utilised these forces for their local political gains. The resolution also said, "Opportunistic, parochial and chauvinistic" forces like Shiv Sena and MNS have exploited the situation for narrow electoral gains and demanded compensation for those affected by the violence. The resolution stated that in 1966, Bal Thackeray gave anti-South Indian slogans and now his nephew wants to repeat that experience by giving anti-North Indian slogans. The All India Minorities Front (AIMF) threatened to launch a nationwide agitation against Raj if he did not mend his ways and avoid targeting North Indians and non-Maharashtrians.

== Media coverage and response ==
The cover page of the magazine The Week, depicting Raj Thackeray as Adolf Hitler

The anti-North Indian violence was labelled as a 'tirade against North Indians' by sections of the national media (The Hindu, The Times of India, Deccan Herald, Hindustan Times, The Economic Times) and international media (Khaleej Times). The Hindustan Times published a survey on the front page on 15 February, which said that 73 percent of Mumbai believed the insular line of the MNS and its president against North Indians was denting Mumbai's cosmopolitan image. The Hindustan Times later received a call from the MNS spokesperson Shirish Parkar protesting the findings of the study. Raj blamed the English-language and Hindi-language media of being biased against him and his party. In addition, some held the media responsible of giving Raj undue publicity. According to an SMS/web poll conducted by CNN IBN, 88 percent of the voters were of the opinion that Raj Thackeray was "feeding on media hype". On 11 February, in Pune, a group of about 15 MNS activists burnt 150 copies of The Week, a weekly magazine in English, in reaction to its cover story on Raj's controversial utterances, portraying him as Mumbai's Hitler.

The Editor-in-Chief of Outlook, Vinod Mehta, said in a debate on the media's role in the situation, "Here is a politician [Raj Thackeray] propounding an idea that could lead to a civil war in the country. The doctrine had to be challenged and what could the media have done? While you may argue that some images were in excess, you will also agree we had to report because this fight to the streets". Ending the debate on a sarcastic note Mehta said, "It's ridiculous! The politicians are not responsible, the state government isn't responsible, police are not to be blamed but media is responsible".

There is no denying that civic amenities in Mumbai are cracking under the added pressure of a migrant population seeking the riches of India's commercial capital. The solution cannot be wielding a lathi or a sword. Nor can it be in jingoistic expressions of Marathi pride or North Indian chest thumping. Mumbai will do well to remember how the city came together during the train blasts (11 July 2006 Mumbai train bombings). No one asked then, who is a migrant and who is a Maharashtrian. It's dangerous to solve administrative problems with ethnic quick fixes.

— CNN IBN's editorial

Painter Pranava Prakash did his exhibition titled "Chal Hat Be Bihari" in January 2009 in Delhi protesting violence against north Indians in Mumbai.

=== Local vernacular media ===
The Marathi daily Maharashtra Times editorial on Raj's arrest said that his arrest was a big farce, from which he emerged with pomp and style. It condemned the violence that resulted after the arrest that forced thousands of migrant workers to uproot themselves from various parts of Maharashtra. Loksatta criticised the television channels for their relentless replay of just two instances to portray the violent impact of his arrest. The edit blamed Hindi channels for making Mumbai look like Gujarat during the 2002 Gujarat riots. Another editor in the same daily also wrote that the "Marathi andolan" (Marathi demonstration) will not benefit any party, as the Marathi vote would be divided between the Shiv Sena and MNS. Lokmat, another popular Marathi daily, published a special on a population survey conducted by the Tata Institute of Social Sciences (TISS), according to which, there has been a 21% decrease in the migrant population in the city since 1961. The North Indian population, however, witnessed an increase from 12 to 24 percent. Saamna's editorial asked what wrong Ambadas Bararao, the Maharashtrian man killed in the violence, had committed. The editor of Sakal wrote that although Raj had gained political mileage by taking up the cause of Marathi people, its impact was severe on the migrants, who had to flee the state.

Nikhil Wagle, Editor-in-Chief of Lokmat TV, on the day of Raj's arrest said in an interview with CNBC India that the Mumbai police should have acted against Raj Thackeray and Abu Azmi earlier. He said, "Had they acted, there would have been no violence. I think the police reacted a little late." He expressed his apprehensions about the Shiv Sena stirring up some trouble to compete with Raj Thackeray as he had put the Sena on the back foot. "Raj Thackeray has stolen the show from Uddhav Thackeray. I think Bal Thackeray will be worried and he will create some trouble. He might give some provocative statements. So, the police have to be observant otherwise it will be a fight between the two brothers and Maharashtra and Mumbai will suffer."

Indian Express editor Sudheendra Kulkarni's open letter in Loksatta (Marathi newspaper owned by The Indian Express) to Raj Thackeray, in response to Raj's article in Marathi titled Maazi Bhoomika, Maaza Ladha (My Stand, My Struggle) in the Maharashtra Times of 9 February. The letter by Sudheendra which admonished Raj Thackeray for his "hate speech" solicited a response from Raj. A similar open letter was addressed to Raj by journalist Rajdeep Sardesai to Raj deploring his party's actions in the 19 October 2008 All-India Railway Recruitment Board examination attack.

I have carefully read, and re-read, your signed article in Marathi titled Maazi Bhoomika, Maaza Ladha (My Stand, My Struggle) in the Maharashtra Times of 9 February, and think that some of your arguments are far too nuanced to be simply categorised as hate speech... If Abu Azmi, or some other leaders claiming to represent the 'north Indian voters' in Mumbai have behaved haughtily, and shown disrespect for the city's Marathi-speaking people, protest by all means. But why are you yourself showing disrespect to the entire community of north Indians, as is evident from your article and your other reported statements? How can you allow your supporters to take law into their hands and do raada (street mayhem)? Can you justify the politics of violence against a fellow-Indian, as was evident when an innocent employee of HAL was killed in a stone-throwing incident in Nashik following your arrest in Mumbai?^{*}

— Excerpt from Indian Express editor Sudheendra Kulkarni's open letter in Loksatta (Marathi newspaper owned by The Indian Express) to Raj Thackeray

A guest is welcomed if he adjusts himself to the host's house. But if he tries to change the host's house through dadagiri, we won't tolerate it. And no means no!

I am proud of my workers for their struggle! Please don't call it 'Rada' (hooliganism) by giving old and historic references. They hit the streets to protect their own language and culture. Police are visiting their houses again and again and beating them up like cattle to punish them for protecting their language and culture.

They are tolerating it quietly. For whom? For Maharashtra! For India! It is fashionable for intellectuals here to blame my party for the unsolved problem of Marathi identity. But am I or my party responsible for it?^{*}

— Excerpt from Raj Thackeray's letter to Loksatta in response to Sudheendra Kulkarni's letter

* Translated in English (original text in Marathi)

== Political analysis ==
Political observers commented that the attacks on North Indians by MNS were a "shrewd ploy" of their chief Raj to embarrass the Shiv Sena and usurp its core Marathi constituency. They also felt Raj was trying to gain a political foothold by imitating his uncle and political mentor Bal Thackeray, who had headed the anti-South Indian campaign—"Lungi Bhagao, Pungi Bajao" (throw out those who wear lungis, celebrate by blowing bugles)—during the formative years of the Shiv Sena in the 1960s.

Kumar Ketkar, the editor of the Marathi daily Loksatta, said though Raj might have achieved what he wanted, but he may have not anticipated the attention it would get. He said, "He thought the media would gobble it up and just create a small storm that will shift the agenda. But the great Amar Singh and Abu Azmi fuelled the issue by taking him more seriously than what he deserves. The confrontational position aided the MNS volunteers to get into the limelight". Ketkar also said the Shiv Sena would lose in the scenario commenting, "The Sena tried to woo the North Indians after it realised their value as a vote bank in the 2004 defeat. They realised that the demography of the city had changed within a decade. That is when they decided it was time to please the North Indians. Uddhav started organising Uttar Bharatiya functions. This is the year that he bore the fruits of his efforts. That is why Raj decided to strike at the same sentiment that the Sena played in the past—the Marathi Manoos."

The author of The Sena Story, Vaibhav Purandare, said Raj resorted to this measure to stem his party's eroding credibility. He said, "When Raj launched his party, he first started out with an inclusive approach. When he found that it is not working, he had to do something drastic to get back into the limelight. On the other hand, the Sena was actually becoming inclusive. It even began attracting Muslims into its fold. It also began taking up the common man's issues like farmer suicides and power supply. This is Raj's attempt to take the Sena's mass base away to completely embarrass the Sena. And he has succeeded." Both Ketkar and Purandare, however, agreed that Raj was trying to position himself as Bal Thackeray's potential successor.

=== Alleged Congress support for MNS ===
Shubhangi Khapre of Daily News and Analysis noted in her article titled Forget political will, Raj has state support, stated, "Ever since its birth on 9 March 2006, MNS has been nurtured by the ruling Congress and Nationalist Congress Party (NCP) with an ulterior motive of splitting the Shiv Sena. Ironically, the Sena itself was given a 'protected childhood' in the late 1960s by the then Congress as a tool to war with the Communist Party of India, which had a strong presence in Mumbai. Not surprisingly, covertly the administration has provided Raj adequate platform to consolidate the political forum through an emotive Marathi plank. The purpose is to split the 26% Marathi voters in Mumbai, which is rather loyal to the Shiv Sena. The electoral merit of the MNS remains untested but its ability to bond with sons of the soil cannot be cursorily dismissed in Mumbai, Thane, Nashik and Pune." She further noted, "Under chief minister Vilasrao Deshmukh, the Congress sees a double advantage in the strategy: A proactive MNS will divide Sena voters on the one hand and drive Mumbai’s North Indian community — which was being targeted as "outsiders" by the MNS — to Congress's lap. North Indians, who dominate 48 essential services in Mumbai, constitute a sizeable — and hence decisive — vote bank. Forget political will, it is well-calculated political design which has withheld the Democratic Front government from taking stern action against Raj. Or else, how does one explain home minister RR Patil engaging in a telephone conversation urging him to slow down instead of arresting his men indulging in violence on streets?" She also said, "(Vilasrao) Deshmukh is no better. He has often said, "My administration will not tolerate divisive forces. Nobody is above the law"." She expressed her views in reference to, Bombay High Court on lashing out at the Maharashtra government over the threat given by Maharashtra Navnirman Sena about displaying the Marathi signboard on the shops and establishments in the metropolis. "If you don't have political will, then give that message to the people that we can not do anything," Division Bench of Justice J N Patel and K K Tated said dissatisfied about government's inaction against hooliganism of Maharashtra Navnirman Sena activists. "Why no action has been taken against respondent number six (Raj Thackeray)? Are some people 'untouchable' for you?" Justice Patel asked as government failed to file a proper reply regarding the action taken.

Congress leader Hussain Dalwai said, "It's a sad commentary on the administration which has come to a stage where it requires the high court intervention". He put the onus of his party's coalition partner, saying, "Whether it is MNS violence in the signboard or dalit killing at Khairlanji it shows an insensitive administration. The NCP president Sharad Pawar should seriously reflect on the working of the state home department." Even NCP leaders including Ajit Pawar and Chhagan Bhujbal have told RR Patil and Deshmukh, in the cabinet meet to "either act or shut up". Suggesting that the Maharashtra government was not keen on taking strong action against MNS chief Raj Thackeray, the NDA on Thursday described as "stage-managed show" the arrest and bail for him in cases of violence against north Indians in the state. BJP MP Shahnawaz Hussain said, "Congress is Raj Thackeray's event management company and it is trying to project Raj's arrest as an event instead of making any serious effort to check the violent campaign of MNS against north Indians. There is match-fixing between Raj and the Maharashtra government. The state government deliberately books him under small sections and he gets bail." Talking on the attacks on North Indian candidates at the All-India Railway Recruitment examinations in Mumbai, Rajya Sabha MP and JD-U national general secretary Shivananda Tiwari also attacked Congress for "promoting" the MNS chief and comparing him with slain Punjab separatist leader Bhindarwale. "Congress party has a mastery in creating 'bhasmasurs' (self destructing demons). Earlier they created Bhindranwale in Punjab, which killed a Congress Prime Minister. Even this Raj Thackeray is ultimately going to damage Congress," Tiwari claimed. He also alleged that Maharashtra government arrested Raj to carry out a "formality" and as mild charges were pressed, he got bail soon.

== Resumption of verbal attacks ==
=== Raj Thackeray ===
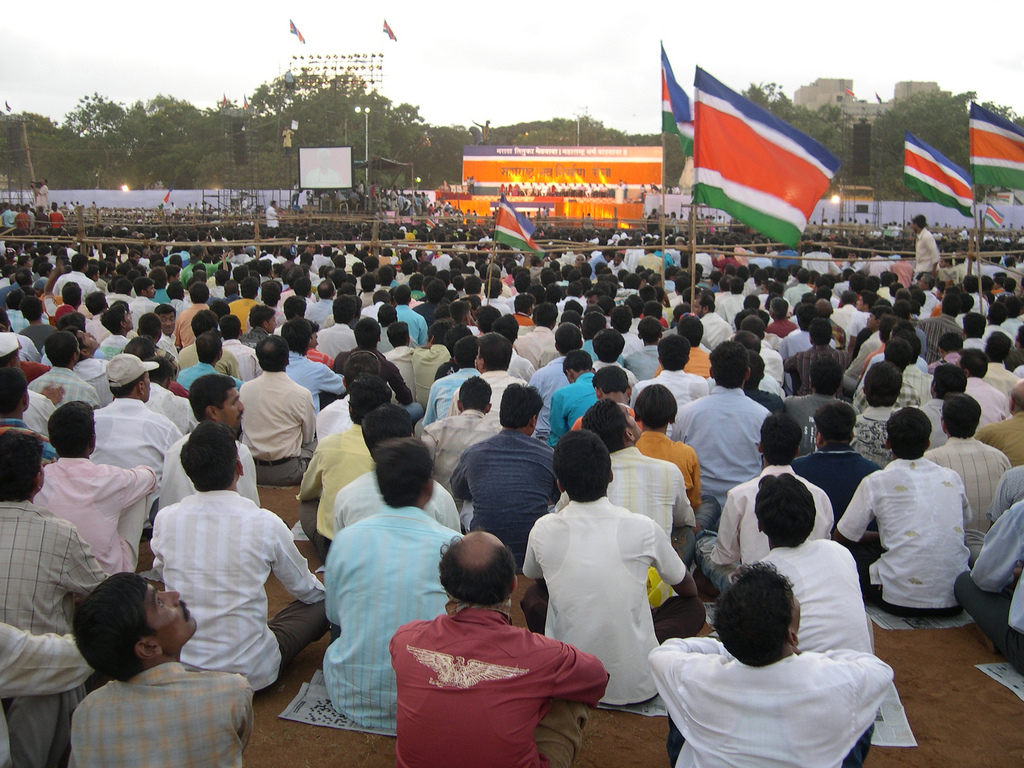
MNS supporters attending the rally held on 3 May 2008 at Shivaji Park, Mumbai

While still under the gag order, in an interview with the Marathi weekly magazine Lok Prabha of the Indian Express group, Raj was quoted as saying: "We will go with folded hands and ask them [North Indians] to leave. If they refuse, then we will raise our hands." Lok Prabha editor Pravin Tokekar said: "The MNS chief has technically not made any inflammatory statement. Even when he says he and his party would go with folded hands to people asking them to leave and only raise hands if they refuse, he treads the ground gingerly without naming any community or party per se". On 3 March, at a party function organised by the MNS at Shivaji Park, after the expiry of the gag order, Raj announced, "I have not given up my mission", thus signalling to his supporters of continuing his stance on the migrant issue.

Then on 3 May, despite legal warnings by the police before his rally, Raj issued a diktat to his supporters to take action whenever they encountered "injustice". At a rally at Shivaji Park, he said, "That north Indians are living in Mumbai is because of our mercy. Let it be known". He told MNS leaders to shed their complacence and advised his supporters to "take action" whenever they felt necessary. He warned that North Indians who did not speak Marathi and did not respect Marathi culture would be driven away. Raj dared the police in his speech by saying, "Arrest me for this if you can". After analysing the speech amidst demand for action against the MNS chief a senior police official quoted it was "difficult to find an explicit threat or provocation" in the text of his speech to initiate strong legal action against him and "it seems he [Raj] consulted legal experts before making the speech".

=== Bal Thackeray ===
On 6 March, Bal Thackeray issued an editorial titled Ek Bihari, Sau Bimari (One Bihari, Hundred illnesses) in Saamna, Shiv Sena's political mouthpiece, saying Biharis were "an unwanted lot" in the country. In what was termed as an apparent bid to recapture his party's Marathi sons of soil plank, which was being hijacked by the MNS leader Raj, Thackeray wrote about Biharis,

"They [Biharis] are not wanted in southern India, Assam and also Punjab and Chandigarh. The Biharis have antagonised local population wherever they had settled. The UP-Bihari MPs have shown their ingratitude towards Mumbai and Maharashtra with an anti-Marathi tirade in Parliament."

He also denounced Bihari MPs, saying they were "spitting in the same plate from which they ate" by criticising Mumbaikars and Maharashtrians. He also wrote, "They are trying to add fuel to the fire that has been extinguished, by saying that Mumbaikars have rotten brains". The outburst was apparently in response to MPs from Bihar who had disrupted the proceedings of the Lok Sabha in protest against the attacks on North Indians. Bihar chief minister, Nitish Kumar, upset with the remarks, demanded that the Prime Minister and the Centre intervene in the matter immediately. The Saamna editorial prompted at least 16 Lok Sabha MPs from Bihar and Uttar Pradesh, belonging to the RJD, JD (U), SP and the Congress, to give notice for breach of privilege proceedings against Bal Thackeray. After the matter was raised in the Lok Sabha Speaker Somnath Chatterjee said: "If anybody has made any comment on our members' functioning in the conduct of business in the House, not only do we treat that with the contempt that it deserves, but also any action that may be necessary will be taken according to procedure and well established norms. Nobody will be spared".

On 27 March, in protest against Bal Thackeray's editorial, leaders of Shiv Sena in Delhi resigned citing its "outrageous conduct" towards non-Marathis in Maharashtra and announced that they will form a separate party. Addressing a press conference Shiv Sena's North India chief Jai Bhagwan Goyal said the decision to leave the party was taken because of the "partial attitude" of the party high command towards Maharashtrians. "Shiv Sena is no different from Khalistan and Jammu and Kashmir militant groups which are trying to create a rift between people along regional lines. The main aim of these forces is to split our country. Like the Maharashtra Navnirman Sena, the Shiv Sena too has demeaned North Indians and treated them inhumanely", he said.

Evaluating the developments, political observers in Mumbai remarked that the Shiv Sena had been "caught in a bind" by Raj's campaign as it had in recent years sought to portray an inclusive image to try to woo the significant migrant vote in the Mumbai and Thane region in the run-up to the Assembly elections in 2009. To balance this strategy, the party had started speaking up for Maharashtrians to remind them that it was the Shiv Sena was the original voice of the local people.
