= Hasan Gafoor =

Indian police commissioner (1950–2012)

Hasan Gafoor IPS

Police Commissioner of Mumbai
- In office 1 March 2008 – 12 June 2009
- Preceded by: D.N. Jadhav

Personal details
- Born: 11 December 1950 Hyderabad, India
- Died: 12 March 2012 (aged 61) Mumbai, India
- Resting place: Mumbai, India
- Citizenship: Indian
- Occupation: Law enforcement
- Known for: Director General of Police, Maharashtra

Hasan Gafoor (11 December 1950 – 12 March 2012) was the Director General of Police of Maharashtra (Anti Corruption bureau). Previously he was the Director General of Police of Maharashtra and managing director of the Maharashtra Police Housing & Welfare Corporation. He was the Police Commissioner of Mumbai, but was transferred as an aftermath of the 2008 Mumbai attacks. Prior to being the Police Commissioner, he was the Additional Director General, Anti-Corruption Bureau (ACB) between 15 June 2007 and 29 February 2008. Gafoor was a 1974 batch IPS officer.

Hasan Gafoor was indicted in Pradhan commission report on lack of leadership during the Mumbai terror attacks. Hasan Gafoor died of a heart attack in the Breach Candy Hospital, Mumbai, on 12 March 2012.

== Incidents ==
During his tenure as Police Commissioner of Mumbai the following events took place:

1. 2008 anti-North Indian violence in Maharashtra
2. 2008 Ahmedabad bombings
3. Rahul Raj encounter
4. 2008 Mumbai attacks

Preceded by D.N. Jhadav	Police Commissioner of Mumbai; 1 March 2008 – 13 June 2009	Succeeded by Dhanushyakodi Sivanandan
