= 2008 All-India Railway Recruitment Board examination attack =

On 19 October 2008, Maharashtra Navnirman Sena (MNS) activists attacked North Indian candidates appearing for the All India Railway Recruitment Board entrance exam for the Western region in Mumbai, India. The attacks invoked a quick reaction from Bihar members of the Union Government in Delhi, notably the Union Railways Minister Lalu Prasad Yadav and his cabinet colleague, Ram Vilas Paswan. The Chief Minister of Bihar, Nitish Kumar spoke to his Maharashtra counterpart Vilasrao Deshmukh and urged him to provide protection to the migrants from Bihar. Lalu called for the MNS to be shut down and called Raj Thackeray, its leader, a "mental case."

Pawan Mahto, a resident of Bara-Khurd village in Nalanda district, Bihar died after being assaulted by MNS activists. However, railway police claimed, based on the CCTV footage, that Pawan had died due to an accident at Andheri station after slipping at a platform.

On 20 October 2008, Thackeray was arrested in Ratnagiri after Mumbai police had received a non-bailable warrant issued by a Jamshedpur court against the MNS chief.

== Incident ==
MNS (Maharashtra Navnirman Sena) and Shiv Sena activists attacked 13 railway board examination centres in suburban Mumbai to protest against "inadequate representation" of locals of Maharashtra in the above said exams. As per MNS, locals i.e. Maharashtrians should be given priority over others as the railway posts were vacant in Maharashtra.MNS workers entered the examination halls and vacated all the people of bihar and stopped them from giving the exams.

== Violence ==
Raj's arrest ignited violence by his supporters in large parts of the city forcing it to shut down. Irate supporters went on the rampage torching public transport and telling office goers to return home. Many shops and commercial establishments, especially those run or managed by non-Maharashtrians, chose not to open at all to avoid trouble. Raj, whose MNS workers Sunday attacked non-Maharashtrians appearing for the railway board examination, was brought from Ratnagiri, about 250 km from here, to be produced at the Bandra court, where he was summoned for.

There was mayhem outside the court premises with large crowds gathering around restively and camera crews waiting to capture the trouble.[ In some places, buses, taxis and autorickshaws were set on fire, in other areas public transport just stayed off the roads. The office of the state Congress spokesperson Sanjay Nirupam was also vandalised.]

A North Indian shopkeeper was killed in Bhandup, Mumbai after he refused to shut down his shop when MNS activists protesting Raj's arrest forced him to do so. Four persons were killed and another seriously injured in a village near Kalyan. Deputy commissioner of police (rural) Sanjay Shintre said two North Indians, a member of the Agri community and an MNS worker were killed in a clash between the two communities in Pisavali, 10 km from Kalyan. Earlier, curfew had been imposed in the entire Kalyan area. The situation in Kalyan worsened in the evening as Raj was driven there to a police station lock-up where he was to spend the night before being presented in a court on 22 October. Five outdoor broadcast vans belonging to media houses were damaged by MNS supporters. A cameraman from ETV was injured and had to be admitted to a private hospital. One Kalyan-Dombivli municipal transport bus was set on fire while five bikes were reduced to ashes. Transport services across Kalyan were paralysed. A jewellery shop was also ransacked by MNS supporters. In all one hundred and twenty-five cases of arson, rioting and stonepelting were registered across the state, including in Pune and Marathwada, by early evening, and 2,085 people were arrested, state director general of police A N Roy said.

As news about the arrest spread, there was violence in other parts of Maharashtra too. Sporadic incidents of stone pelting at municipal and private buses were reported in the rest of Maharashtra following the arrest of MNS chief Raj Thackeray in Ratnagiri. In Kothrud area, some alleged MNS activists damaged a company's bus that was taking its employees to workplace. Few Pune Municipal Transport (PMT) buses were stoned by MNS activists, police said. Meanwhile, police have picked up around 100 MNS activists, including some corporators as a preventive measure. In Nashik, MNS activists set ablaze a truck near PWD minister Chhagan Bhujbal's farm and also damaged another truck at Vilholi-Phata area, police said. Incidents of stone pelting on MSRTC buses and other vehicles were reported in some areas, they said, adding vehicular traffic on the busy Mumbai-Agra-national highway was disrupted following the protest. Police rounded up 70 MNS activists in Nashik incidents and security was tightened in the city. In Solapur, incidents of stone pelting on state transport buses were also reported. In Nagpur MNS party leaders claimed to have damaged several MSRTC buses.

== Protests ==
Shivananda Tiwari, Rajya Sabha MP and JD-U national general secretary, blaming the Bihar state government for the reactionary violence in Bihar by the agitated youths and said,"This reaction is out of frustration and is totally spontaneous. People are very angry at the treatment meted out to the state youths in Maharashtra.". Various cases were filed in Bihar and Jharkhand against Raj Thackeray for assaulting the students. A murder case was also filed by Jagdish Prasad, father of Pawan Kumar, who was allegedly killed by MNS activists in Mumbai. Mumbai police, however, claimed it to be a case of accident. Bihar Chief Minister Nitish Kumar announced a compensation of Rs 150,000 to Pawan's family. Bihar state Congress chief, Anil Kumar Sharma, has demanded enactment of an Act by Parliament for closing opportunities to any political party or organisation that indulge in obscurantism and raise such narrow, chauvinistic issues based on caste, religion and regionalism to capture power.

=== Bihar ===
Angry students in various parts of Bihar damaged railway property and disrupted train traffic, as protests continued against assaults on north Indians by MNS activists in Mumbai. The police said the protesters targeted Patna, Jehanabad, Barh, Khusrupur, Sasaram and Purnia railway stations in the morning. The protesting students reportedly set afire two AC bogies of an express train at Barh railway station. They ransacked Jehanabad, Barh, Purnia and Sasaram railway stations. According to the railway police, at least 10 students were detained in the morning and extra security was deployed to control the situation.

Noted Physician Dr Diwakar Tejaswi observed a day-long fast in Patna to protest against repeated violence by the Maharashtra Navnirman Sena (MNS) leader Raj Thackeray and his goons against the north Indians.

Various student organisations gave a call for Bihar shutdown on 25 Oct 2008 to protest attacks on north Indian candidates by Maharashtra Navnirnam Sena activists during a Railway recruitment examination in Mumbai. During the anti-MNS agitation a group of 63 tourists, of which many were Marathis, were on a tour of sacred Buddhist sites. The tourists found themselves stranded on the outskirts of Patna as riots broke out. The Marathis in the group were forced to hide their identity for fear of attacks. The group avoided speaking in Marathi, and woman wore saris in the north Indian rather than the Marathi style. For security, the group had to escorted by 25 policeman to the station. The tourists reached Nagpur safely.

=== Uttar Pradesh ===
A group of 25 people pelted stones on the Maharashtra Bhawan in Khalasi Line, Kanpur, Uttar Pradesh. Constructed in 1928, the building is owned by the lone trust run by Marathis in Kanpur. Over the years, it has served as an important venue for prominent festivals, including Ganesh Utsav and Krishna Janmastami.

=== Delhi ===
A group of 20 youths, from Bihar, attacked Maharashtra Sadan in the capital on 3 November. The Rashtrawadi Sena has claimed responsibility for the attack. They ransacked the reception of the building and raised slogans against Raj Thackeray.

=== Jharkhand ===
After the October 2008 anti-Bihari attacks in Maharashtra, members of the Bharatiya Bhojpuri Sangh (BBS) vandalised the official residence of Tata Motors, Jamshedpur plant head S.B. Borwankar, a Maharashtrian. Armed with lathis and hockey sticks, more than 100 BBS members trooped to Borwankar's Nildih Road bungalow around 3.30pm. Shouting anti-MNS slogans, they smashed windowpanes and broke flowerpots. BBS president Anand Bihari Dubey called the attack on Borwankar's residence unfortunate, and said that he knew BBS members were angry after the attack in Maharashtra on Biharis, but did not expect a reaction. Fear of further violence gripped the 4,000-odd Maharashtrian settlers living in and around the city.

== Political reactions ==
Maharashtra Chief Minister Vilasrao Deshmukh admitted that his government was responsible for failure in preventing the attacks by MNS on north Indian candidates at Railways examination centres and ordered a probe into the incident, which will also enquire into why the job advertisements where not given in Marathi newspapers. "What has happened is not good. Such incidents take place because of loopholes in the law. One can't hold only the Home Ministry responsible for it, it is (entire) government's responsibility. Such incidents are affecting the image of the state and I have instructed the DGP to take stern action," Deshmukh said. However, powerful Congress leader Narayan Rane, wrote a piece in the 23 October 2008 issue of 'Prahar', in a city newspaper he owns, pleading that Marathis should get their legitimate share in the central government sector. The Times of India noted, the essay indicates that Rane continues to have a soft spot for MNS chief Raj Thackeray – the two were close friends when Rane was in the Sena. Stating that the Marathis were getting a raw deal in central government jobs such as income tax and the railways, Rane said it was perplexing that of 54,000, only 54 Marathis were summoned for the railway recruitment exams. The railways must give Marathis their legitimate share in employment, Rane said. Political parties condemned the attack by MNS activists on north Indian candidates who had come to appear in railway board exam in the city. "Strict action should be taken on MNS activists for the attack," said Bihari origin Congress leader Sanjay Nirupam. Maharashtra Chief Minister Vilasrao Deshmukh said his government will not tolerate Raj Thackeray's party. NCP spokesperson Gurunath Kulkarni also demanded harsh action against the activists. "I condemned the attack by MNS activists. They are not doing any good for Marathi people but spoiling the name of Maharashtra," Kulkarni said.

Bihar Chief Minister Nitish Kumar demanded action against the Maharashtra Navnirman Sena activists and full security to students. Nitish Kumar requested Maharashtra Chief Minister Vilasrao Deshmukh intervention. Kumar directed the additional director general of police to contact senior police officials in Maharashtra and compile a report on Sunday's incident and asked the home commissioner to hold talks with the Maharashtra home secretary to seek protection for people from Bihar.

What can I do? I wrote a most strongly worded letter after the all-party delegation from Bihar met me. I also spoke to the Maharashtra Chief Minister.

— Manmohan Singh, Prime Minister of India

Bihar Chief Minister Nitish Kumar demanded action against the Maharashtra Navnirman Sena activists and full security to students. Nitish Kumar requested Maharashtra Chief Minister Vilasrao Deshmukh intervention. Kumar directed the additional director general of police to contact senior police officials in Maharashtra and compile a report on Sunday's incident and asked the home commissioner to hold talks with the Maharashtra home secretary to seek protection for people from Bihar. He said: "I expect the Maharashtra government to act tough and protect our students."

Others have also chimed in saying:

- The Bharatiya Janata Party (BJP) was responsible for the entrenchment of Shiv Sena and its chief Bal Thackeray as well as Maharashtra Navnirman Sena (MNS) and its chief Raj Thackeray in the affairs of Maharashtra, even as they believed in and practised narrow politics based on caste, religion, regionalism and chauvinistic ambitions. BJP entered into an opportunistic alliance with Shiv Sena chief Bal Thackeray and also helped in paving the way for the rule of this party on Maharashtra." Anil Kumar Sharma, Bihar state Congress chief
- "The Congress party has a mastery in creating 'bhasmasurs' (self destructing demons). Earlier they created Bhindranwale in Punjab, which killed a Congress Prime Minister. Even this Raj Thackeray is ultimately going to damage Congress" Shivananda Tiwari, Rajya Sabha MP and JD-U national general secretary
- "The Congress is Raj Thackeray's event management company and it is trying to project Raj's arrest as an event instead of making any serious effort to check the violent campaign of MNS against north Indians. There is match-fixing between Raj and the Maharashtra government. The state government deliberately books him under small sections and he gets bail." Shahnawaz Hussain, BJP MP

== Similar attack ==
In 2003, the Shiv Sena alleged that of the 500 Maharashtrian candidates, only ten of them successful in the Railways exams. 90 per cent of the successful candidates were alleged to be from Bihar. Activists from the Shiv Sena ransacked a railway recruitment office in protest against non-Marathi's being among the 650,000 candidates set to compete for 2,200 railway jobs in the state. Eventually, after attacks on Biharis heading towards Mumbai for exams, the central government delayed the exams.

== See also ==
- 2008 attacks on North Indians in Maharashtra
- Anti-Bihari sentiment
- Rahul Raj encounter
