= Barva (disambiguation) =

Barva is a canton in Costa Rica.

Barva may also refer to:

- Barva (district), Costa Rica
- Barva Volcano, Costa Rica
- Fermín Barva (fl. 1932–1953), Filipino film director

== See also ==
- Barvas, Scotland, a settlement and civil parish
- Barve, an Indian surname
