= Dhananjay Jadhav =

Indian police commissioner (1947–2021)

Dhananjay N. Jadhav

Police Commissioner of Mumbai
- In office 1 March 2007 – 29 February 2008
- Preceded by: Anami Narayan Roy
- Succeeded by: Hasan Gafoor

Personal details
- Born: 1947
- Died: 30 March 2021 (aged 73–74)
- Citizenship: Indian
- Children: Ajay Jadhav Keerti and Sharvari
- Occupation: Law enforcement
- Known for: Mumbai Police Commissioner

Dhananjay N. Jadhav (1947 – 30 March 2021) was a Police Commissioner of Mumbai.

Preceded by Anami Narayan Roy	Police Commissioner of Mumbai; 1 March 2007 – 29 February 2008	Succeeded by Hasan Gafoor
