= Sanjeev Dayal =

- Born: 20 September 1955 (age 70); Delhi
- Education: B.COM, MBA
- Police career
- Country: Indian Police Service
- Department: Mumbai Police
- Service years: 1977 – 2015
- Awards: President's Police Medal for Distinguished Service (2003)

Sanjeev Dayal (1977 batch IPS officer) was the Director General of Police of Maharashtra. He was Director General (Anti-Corruption Bureau) before taking over as DGP.

== Career ==
Dayal, hailing from Delhi, was a former Mumbai Police Commissioner. In his 35 years of service as an IPS (Indian Police Service) officer, Dayal has held several key positions across the state, along with stints with the Intelligence Bureau (IB) and Special Protection Group (SPG).He was handling the reins of the Anti-Corruption Bureau as the DGP before he took over as the Mumbai Police Commissioner.

Between 1988 and 1992, Dayal was on central deputation with the IB, following which he was posted as the Superintendent of police at Amravati, Maharashtra. From 1993 to 1995, he was Additional Commissioner of Police of northwest Mumbai. He also served with the SPG from 1995 to 2002. As external security chief in 1999, he was responsible for the security of former Prime Minister Atal Bihari Vajpayee during his historic visit to Pakistan.

== Barack Obama's Convoy ==
Sanjeev Dayal, the then Police Commissioner refused to allow US President Barack Obama's Cadillac to advance until US Secret Service Snipers vacated unauthorized vantage points along the convoy's route, during his visit to Mumbai. He did not give route clearance due to breach of security protocol by US Agencies which placed their snipers on terrace of St.Xavier's College. Due to which Barack Obama and Michelle Obama, had to wait for 11 minutes at the Holy Name High School at Colaba, Mumbai.

Preceded by Dhanushyakodi Sivanandan	Director General of Police in Maharashtra	Succeeded by Praveen Dixit
