= Barve =

Barve is a surname of Indian origin.

Notable people named Barve include:

- Bhakti Barve (1948–2001), Indian actress
- Kumar Barve (born 1958), American politician
- Mukta Barve (born 1979), Indian actress
- Nachiket Barve, Indian fashion designer
- Prasad Barve, Indian actor
- Priyanka Barve (born 1990), Indian playback singer
- Rahi Anil Barve, Indian film director
- Sadashiv Govind Barve (1914–1967), Indian politician
- Sanjay Barve (born 1959), Indian police officer
- Shyamkumar Barve (born 1978), Indian politician
- Sunil Barve (born 1966), Indian actor
