= Killing of Rahul Raj =

Indian hijacker

Rahul Raj
- Died: Mumbai, India
- Father: Kundan Prasad Singh
- Status: Deceased
- Criminal charges: Hijacking of BEST bus in Mumbai

The shooting of Rahul Raj took place on 27 October 2008, aboard a BEST bus in Mumbai, India. Raj was killed in the shootout with the police after he held a bus with 12 passengers hostage in suburban Kurla. The Mumbai police alleged that he wanted to assassinate the MNS chief, Raj Thackeray. The incident sparked fierce criticism of the police and discussions nationwide, especially from the Bihar politicians. The incident was also seen as a rise of Bihari sub-nationalism to counter the agitation against migrants from Uttar Pradesh and Bihar by MNS.

== Shooting ==
On 27 October 2008, Rahul Raj, a 25-year-old man from Patna, boarded a double decker city bus route No. 332 plying between Kurla and Andheri at Saki Naka stop around 10 am and went to the upper deck. Rahul, wielding a country made revolver, had taken control of the bus and injured one passenger. He was protesting against the attacks on north Indian candidates appearing for a railway examination recently. He also wanted to talk to the Mumbai Police Commissioner and media. The three key eyewitnesses, including the bus conductor, have told the crime branch that Bhagat, the injured passenger, was injured by Rahul Raj's bullet.

Rahul reportedly said that he was not there to harm passengers but instead wanted to 'kill Raj Thackeray'. According to senior inspector, Dadasaheb Godse, Vinoba Bhave station, Kurla, Raj had shouted

I want to kill Raj Thackeray. I have nothing against the passengers. Don't shoot me.

However, he allegedly attacked the conductor of the bus and injured a passenger with his revolver. The bus was taken to the nearest police station. According to key eyewitnesses, Rahul fired multiple shots: One outside the bus on seeing the police which lodged in the metal frame of the bus. He also fired a shot at a hostage passenger Bhagat, who had ducked between the seats on firing of the first shot. In a subsequent police shoot out, Mumbai Police shot him dead. A special team of officers entered the bus and went to the upper deck of the bus. Three police officers fired 13 shots, 4 of which hit Rahul Raj, which was confirmed by a four-member panel of forensic experts at J J Hospital carried out a post-mortem on Rahul. Three hit him in the head and one went through his heart. It was alleged that police could have taken him into custody. ACP Sadanand Date, the officer overseeing the operation (who was later seriously injured and attracted international attention during the 2008 Mumbai attacks because of his actions resisting terrorists at the Cama and Albless Hospital), later told reporters that Rahul Raj had fired upon the police & also shot a hostage passenger. Hence the police had to fire in retaliation.

== Reactions and protests ==
The Deputy Chief Minister R. R. Patil, who also heads the home department of the state, justified the police action against Rahul Raj, saying: "I fully justify the police action. If someone is firing at the police, they will not be silent spectators. Police opened fire at Rahul Raj only after he refused to surrender or hand over his revolver to the police. The police had no option but to fire at him". The killing of Rahul Raj sparked a row between the politicians of Bihar and Maharashtra with several parties demanding a judicial probe into the incident. The father of Rahul Raj, K.P. Singh, earlier said he would appeal to President of India Pratibha Patil for justice. Unable to meet President Pratibha Patil to seek justice, he planned to file a writ petition in the supreme court and seek justice from National Human Rights Commission (NHRC).

Railway Minister Lalu Prasad Yadav, also from the state of Bihar, joined hands with his archrivals Nitish Kumar and Ram Vilas Paswan to condemn the killing of Bihari youth Rahul Raj and demanded action. According to Lalu, the Prime Minister Manmohan Singh had assured him of taking proper action in the matter. Former Delhi Police chief and the current Nagaland Governor Nikhil Kumar (then an MP from Bihar) also heavily criticised the police action. JD(U) MPs from Bihar resigned to protest Rahul Raj's murder. The move came after one of the doctors doing post-mortem claimed that one of the bullets that hit him may have been fired from close range. However, the autopsy report on Rahul Raj revealed that he had been shot from a distance of 4 metres. The Lok Sabha speaker Somnath Chatterjee have accepted the resignation of five Janata Dal (United) MPs' resignation Though the Maharashtra government offered a compensation of Rs 2 lakh to the youth's family, however, the relatives turned down the offer. The MNS general secretary Shirish Parkar accused the ruling Congress and NCP parties trying to appease both Marathis and North Indians and their leaders.

Some of the reactions of eminent people on the incident are as follows:

The police did the right thing. Those who take the law in their hands, will be dealt with in the same way.

— R R Patil, Home minister of Maharashtra

The Bihar Government and the people of the state share the view that a CBI inquiry is necessary to bring out the truth. After all, why a young man carrying a country made pistol, who could have been easily overpowered, was shot dead by the police? The people of the state have every right to know.

— Nitish Kumar, Chief Minister of Bihar

It is unfortunate, if this has not struck him. As per media reports, Rahul Raj, killed by Mumbai Police, was gunning for Raj Thackeray. We will never know the truth. His killing by the police is really unfortunate. Had he been taken alive he could have clarified his intentions. But it is clear that he was not a criminal and still the Mumbai Police treated him as one. It is tragic that the country's premier police force should gloat over a grievously botched-up operation for Rahul could have been disarmed through even a simple use of tear smoke. It was not one of those hostage situations where the police did not have a clear view or access to the hostage taker. The compulsions of the police to not even attempt the classic negotiation method are not known. After all photographs published in the newspapers show, Rahul was carrying a country made firearm which is hardly a lethal weapon that should have scared the crack team of Mumbai Police. We must not gloss over this tragic incident in which a young man was needlessly killed by impatient policemen. It led to a condemnable tragedy. We need to know why this happened. Only an impartial enquiry will help.

— Nikhil Kumar (now Governor of Nagaland), Member of Parliament, former commissioner of police, Delhi

Rahul Raj was not a criminal. His intention was to draw public and government attention to the tirade started by MNS activists against north Indians. Rahul had no past criminal record and so one cannot compare his case with other encounters in which hardened criminals are killed by the police.

— M N Singh, former commissioner of police, Mumbai

Laloo Yadav later tried to encash this incident politically by getting the father of Rahul Raj to campaign for him.

The Supreme court on 10 November 2008, refused a judicial inquiry in the encounter of Rahul Raj.

== Investigation and Court cases ==
The investigation into the incident has been handed over to the Mumbai crime branch. Another high level probe has been ordered by the Maharashtra government which is conducted by Maharashtra chief secretary Johny Joseph. When Maharashtra chief secretary Johny Joseph recently visited the hospital to record Manoj Bhagat's statement, the injured man was unable to recall the incident and the sequence of events. Bhagat was shot at by Rahul Raj.

A Public Interest Litigation was filed in the apex court to seeks judicial probe into the killings of Rahul Raj. Supreme Court issued a notice to the Maharashtra government asking it to respond to allegations of violence against north Indians by MNS workers. The court, however, turned down the plea for a judicial probe into the controversial encounter death of Rahul Raj. The Supreme Court judgement said that the encounter was justified as police did not know that the Rahul Raj was carrying any other weapon, it also said that police cannot act as spectator when any one is firing on public.

== See also ==
- 2008 attacks on North Indians in Maharashtra
- Racism faced by the Bihari community in India
