= Dhanushkodi Sivanandhan =

Police commissioner of Mumbai

Director General of Police, Maharashtra
- In office 14 June 2009 – 2011
- Preceded by: Hasan Gafoor

Personal details
- Born: Pollachi, Coimbatore
- Occupation: Law enforcement & Social Worker
- Known for: Police Commissioner of Mumbai

D. Sivanandhan is the former Police Commissioner of Mumbai, promoted as part of the aftermath of the 2008 Mumbai attacks. He is one of India's most well-known and highly regarded Indian Police Service (IPS) officers. His career spanned multiple high-profile postings over 35 years and he is known for his use of strategy and intelligence to uphold the rule of law.

He served as an active member of the special task force headed by Mr. Naresh Chandra IAS, former Cabinet Secretary, in the National Security Council Secretariat, he helped in restructuring India's internal and external security provisions in 2012.

During his tenure as joint CP Crime Mumbai (1998–2001), he was responsible for neutralising the nefarious activities of underworld headed by notorious criminals like Dawood Ibrahim, Chhota Rajan, Arun Gawli and others. He used the power of detention of criminals (1600), mopping up of illegal weapons (2500) and electronic intelligence gathering system. He also helped making a new law called MCOCA and implemented it by arresting notorious criminals.

During his tenure as CP, Nagpur, Thane and Mumbai he helped establishing training centres, schools, canteens, gymnasiums and officers’ club- all with state of the art infrastructure for the welfare of the policemen. He provided the youth of the city an online portal for better communication called 'copconnect.com' and created an online portal for the safety of senior citizens called 'humarisuraksha.com'.

He now runs a nonprofit organisation called Mumbai Roti Bank and has served 27 Million meals as in March 2026 to the poor since 2018.

He also delivers motivational lectures to the youth on cyber safety, women safety, leadership, organised crime control/mafia control.

== Professional highlights ==
Deputy Director of the Intelligence Bureau from 1987 to 1991, he was tasked with protecting the nation against international criminal syndicates and terror groups.

== Other achievements ==
- He helped build city's defences post 26/11 by acquiring state-of-the-art equipment.
- Completely revamped the Thane Police School, creating an opportunity for more children to get access to excellent educational environment.
- He was the brains behind the Thane Police Hospital, which was Inaugurated in 2007 with free access to OPD for Police officers.
- He was also heavily involved in the creation many facilities for Police like Thane Police Training Centre, Police Officers Club, Police Canteen, Renovation of the C.P.'s Office.
- To ensure Police fitness, he introduced special executive checkup scheme for the entire Mumbai Police force, which included facilities like Yoga, 25 Gymnasium, OPD Facility, etc.
- During his tenure, he also introduced a website to connect with the city youth and give them a better platform to contact police.
- Recipient of the President's Distinguished Service Medal, 2000 as well as the Meritorious Service Medal, 1993 and the Internal Security Medal, 1998.

He was also a member of the special task force in the National Security Council Secretariat (Prime Minister's Office) for revamping India's internal and external national security measures.

Currently, he serves as the chairman of a security investigations and assessments company called Securus First India Pvt. Ltd. He has inaugurated city projects like Nanded, Aurangabad, Kolhapur. He also serves as a Director for many boards of corporate companies.

He has also co-authored a National best seller titled, Chanakya's Seven Secrets of Leadership which is translated into five national languages and 1,50,000 copies being sold. He has also authored a book named The Brahmastra Unleashed- The First Person Account of How the Mumbai Mafia Was Annihilated in 2025.

== Incidents ==
Sivanandan was appointed Joint Commissioner (Crime) for Mumbai in the mid-1990s to tackle the growing gang wars in the city. During his tenure the city witnessed 238 "encounters" with gangsters.

He is an alumnus of the 1976 Batch.

== In popular culture ==
The character of the senior IPS officer portrayed by Malayalam actor Mohanlal in the 2002 film Company, is closely based on him.

Preceded by Hasan Gafoor	Police Commissioner of Mumbai; 1 June 2009 – 2011	Succeeded by Sanjeev Dayal
