= Deven Bharti =

Indian police commissioner

Commissioner of Mumbai Police
- Incumbent
- Assumed office 1 May 2025
- Preceded by: Vivek Phansalkar

Personal details
- Born: 14 August 1968 (age 57)
- Occupation: IPS
- Police career
- Department: Mumbai Police
- Service years: 1994 - present
- Rank: Commissioner of Police

Deven Bharti (born 14 August 1968) is an IPS officer (1994 Batch) of the Maharashtra cadre. He is currently serving as the Commissioner of Mumbai Police since 1 May 2025. He was part of the Mumbai Crime branch that probed an array of high-profile and sensitive cases including the 26/11 Mumbai terror attack.
