= Rashtrawadi Shiv Sena =

- Leader: Jai Bhagwan Goyal
- Founded: 10 May 2008
- Headquarters: B 437, Rashtrawadi Shivsena Bhavan, Main Sahadra Chowk; Sahadra; Delhi; 110032
- Youth wing: Yuva Rashtrawadi Sena

Website
- http://www.rashtrawadishivsena.co.in

Rashtrawadi Shiv Sena (Hindi: राष्ट्रवादी शिवसेना, 'Nationalist Shiva Army') is an Indian political pro-Hindu organization.
