= Anti-Corruption Bureau (Maharashtra) =

Anti-corruption measure in India

Anti Corruption Bureau, Maharashtra is an agency of Government of Maharashtra constituted to investigate offences of bribery and corruption falling within the purview of Prevention of Corruption Act, 1988 in the state of Maharashtra.

Prabhat Kumar ( Additional Charge) IPS, is the current Director General of ACB, Maharashtra. Some years earlier 1988 batch Indian Police Service (IPS) Officer Rajnish Seth was Director General of Anti Corruption Bureau Maharashtra, Parambir Singh was DG ACB before replacing Sanjay Barve as Police Commissioner of Mumbai.
