= Sanjay Barve =

Former Commissioner of Mumbai Police

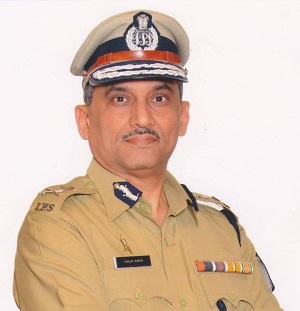
- Born: Sanjay Barve; 13 August 1959 (age 67)
- Education: M.A. L.L.B.
- Occupation: Police Officer
- Organization: Mumbai Police
- Police career
- Department: Maharashtra Police
- Service years: 1987–2020
- Rank: Director General of Police
- Awards: President's Police Medal for Distinguished Service; Police Medal for Meritorious Service

Sanjay Barve (born 13 August 1959) is an Indian police officer from 1987 batch. He was the Police Commissioner of Mumbai, taking charge on 28 February 2019, succeeding Subodh Kumar Jaiswal. Barve was succeeded by Param Bir Singh on 29 February 2020. Barve was previously the director general of the Anti Corruption Bureau, Maharashtra, from 18 September 2018. He has also held the posts of Deputy Commissioner of Police (Economic Offences Wing) as well as an additional charge as head of the State Intelligence Department. He has been the Director of the Maharashtra Police Academy. He was part of a special team which investigated Abdul Karim Telgi. He was awarded the President's Police Medal in 2006.
