= Commissioner of the Greater Mumbai Police =

Chief of the Police in Mumbai, India

Police Commissioner of Mumbai Police
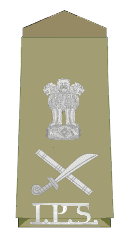
- Rank Insignia of the Police Commissioner (Director General Rank)

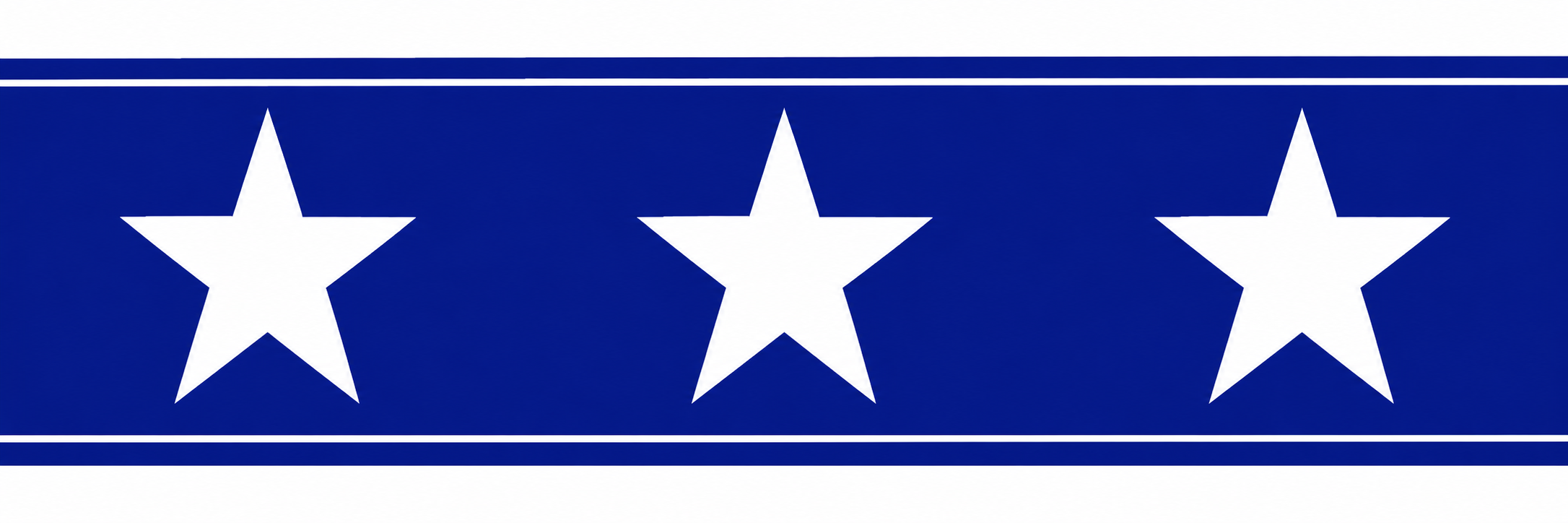
- Star Plate for Police Vehicle
- Incumbent; Deven Bharti IPS since 30 April 2025
- Style: The Honorable
- Residence: Byculla, Mumbai
- Appointer: Government of Maharashtra
- Term length: 1 year
- Inaugural holder: Sir Frank H. Souter
- Formation: 1864
- Deputy: Special Commissioner of Police
- Website: Official Website

The Police Commissioner of Mumbai is the chief of the Mumbai Police, and an officer of the Indian Police Service. The Mumbai Police Commissioner is appointed by the Maharashtra State Government on the recommendation by the Establishment Board, which includes Additional Chief Secretary—Home department and other senior bureaucrats.

The first commissioner was Frank Souter, who was appointed in 1864.

The headquarters are opposite Crawford Market in South Mumbai.

== Criticism ==
Julio Ribeiro wrote that some commissioners are appointed by lobbying. They are expected to repay the favour to the politicians. They transfer junior officials to positions where the politicians can make maximum illegal money.

== List of Police Commissioners of Mumbai ==
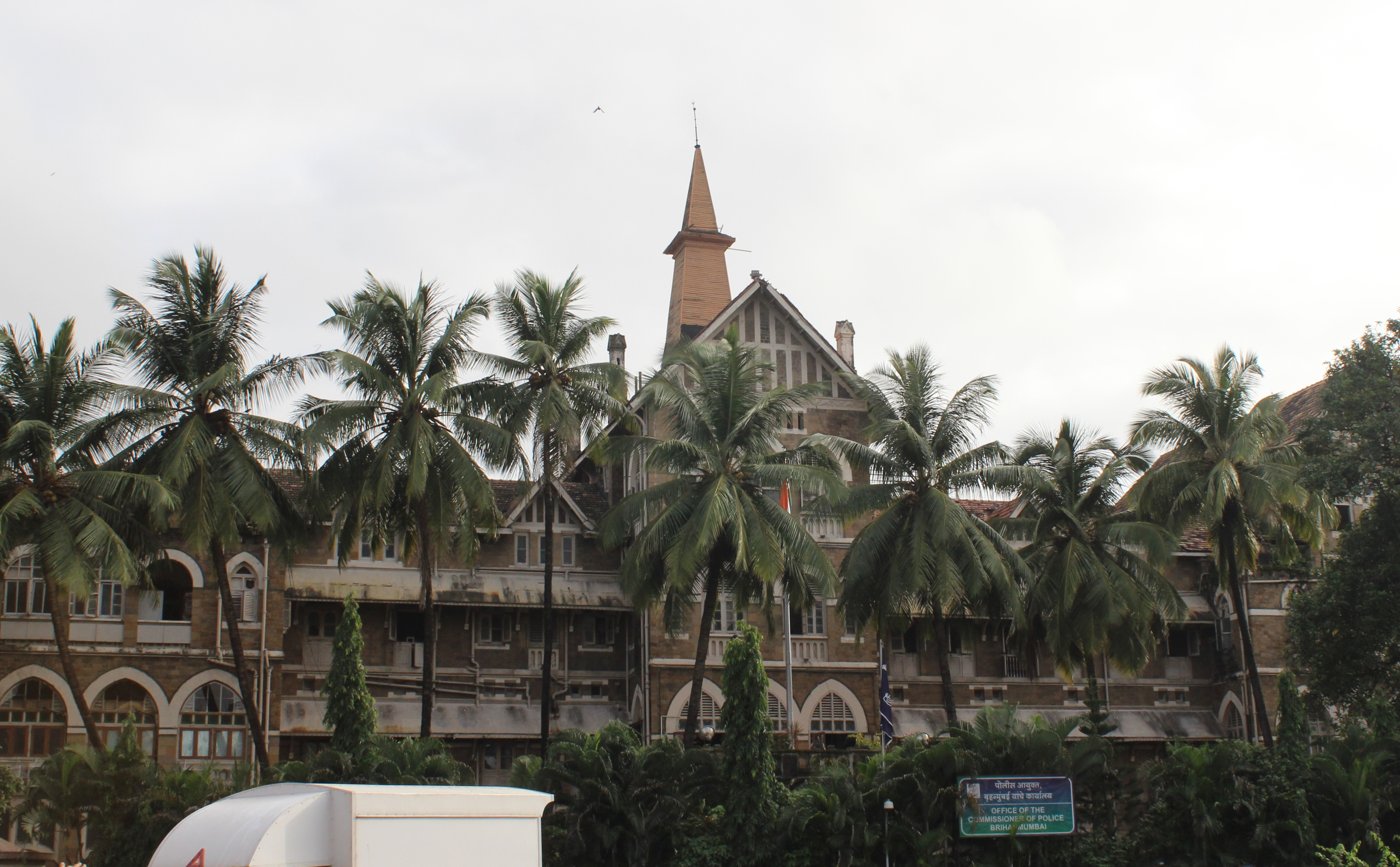
Office of Police Commissioner of Mumbai

List of former Police Commissioners of Mumbai:

Name	Dates in Office	Badge Name	Ref
Deven Bharti	1 May 2025 — present	DEVEN BHARTI	
Vivek Phansalkar	1 July 2022 — 30 April 2025	VIVEK PHANSALKAR	
Sanjay Pandey	28 February 2022 — 30 June 2022	SANJAY PANDEY	
Hemant Nagrale	17 March 2021 — 28 February 2022	HEMANT NAGRALE	
Param Bir Singh	28 February 2020 — 17 March 2021	PARAM BIR SINGH	
Sanjay Barve	28 February 2019 — 28 February 2020	SANJAY BARVE	
Subodh Kumar Jaiswal	30 June 2018 — 27 February 2019	SUBODH JAISWAL	
Dattatray Padsalgikar	31 January 2016 — 29 June 2018	D. D. PADSALGIKAR	
Ahmad Javed	8 September 2015 — 31 January 2016	AHMAD JAVED	
Rakesh Maria	16 February 2014 — 8 September 2015	RAKESH MARIA	
Dr. Satyapal Singh	23 August 2012 — 31 January 2014	SATYA PAL SINGH	
Arup Patnaik	1 March 2011 — 23 August 2012	ARUP PATNAIK	
Sanjeev Dayal	1 June 2010 — 1 March 2011	SANJEEV DAYAL	
Dhanushkodi Sivanandhan	13 June 2009 — 31 May 2010	D. SIVANANDHAN	
Hasan Gafoor	1 March 2008 — 12 June 2009	HASAN GAFOOR	
Dhananjay Jadhav	7 March 2007 — 29 February 2008	D. N. JADHAV	
Anami Narayan Roy	4 February 2004 – 6 March 2007	A. N. ROY	
Dr. Parvinder Singh Pasricha	19 November 2003 — 3 February 2004	P. S. PASRICHA	
Ranjit Singh Sharma	1 January 2003 — 9 November 2003	R. S. SHARMA	
Mahesh Narayan Singh	5 May 2000 — 31 December 2002	M. N. SINGH	
Ronald Hyacinth Mendonca	22 August 1997 — 4 May 2000	R. H. MENDONCA	
S. C. Malhotra	3 December 1996 — 21 August 1997		
R.D. Tyagi	1 November 1995 — 2 December 1996		
Satish Sahney	17 November 1993 — 31 October 1995	SATISH SAHNEY	
Amarjeet Singh Samra	30 January 1993 — 16 November 1993	A. S. SAMRA	
Shreekant Krushnaji Bapat	1 August 1992 — 30 January 1993		
S. Ramamurthi	1 October 1990 — 31 August 1992		
S.V. Bhave	1 January 1990 — 30 September 1990		
Vasant Keshaorao Saraf	1 August 1987 — 31 December 1989	V. K. SARAF	
D. S. Soman	2 May 1985 — 31 July 1987		
Julio Francis Ribeiro	25 February 1982 — 1 May 1985	J. F. RIBEIRO	
K. P. Medhekar	30 January 1981 — 24 February 1982		
M.S. Kasbekar	4 January 1979 — 29 October 1980		
M.G. Gavai	28 July 1978 — 3 January 1979		
V.V. Chaubal	27 June 1977 — 24 March 1978		
S.V. Tankhiwale	19 June 1975 — 26 June 1977		
M.G. Mugve	9 May 1973 — 18 June 1975		
S.G. Pradhan	17 March 1970 — 8 May 1973		
Emmanuel Sumitra Modak	20 January 1968 — 16 March 1970	E. S. MODAK	
A.G. Rajadhyaksha	25 February 1965 — 19 January 1968		
S. Majeeddulla	10 March 1962 — 24 February 1965		
V.J. Kanetkar	25 January 1960 — 9 March 1962		
K. J. Nanavatty	24 December 1959 — 24 January 1960		
Praving Sinhji	21 September 1957 — 23 December 1959		
K. D. Billimoria	3 July 1955 — 20 September 1957		
M.M. Chudasama	16 May 1949 — 2 July 1955		
G.H. Wanjara	1914-1950	G.H. Wanjara was an Indian police officer who served as the Inspector General of Police in Bombay from 1946 to 1950. He was also the first Indian to hold this position, as he succeeded Sir Frank Souter, the last British officer to head the Bombay police. Wanjara was involved in the security arrangements for the visit of Lord Mountbatten, the last Viceroy of India, to Bombay in 1947. He was also responsible for maintaining law and order during the turbulent period of partition and independence. Wanjara was awarded the King’s Police Medal in 1948 for his distinguished service.He join a duty on 1914.	
Jehangir Sohrab Bharucha	15 August 1947 — 16 May 1949	J. S. BHARUCHA	
A. E. Caffin	4 February 1947 — 14 August 1947		
J.C. Wilson	11 July 1946 — 3 February 1947		
P.B. Wilkins	14 June 1946 — 10 July 1946		
H.E. Butler	15 February 1942 — 13 June 1946		
W.R.G. Smith	28 September 1939 — 14 February 1942		
N.P.A. Smith	18 March 1939 — 27 September 1939		
W.R.G. Smith	10 November 1936 — 17 March 1939		
J.W. Rowland	16 May 1936 — 9 November 1936		
W.R.G. Smith	2 September 1933 — 15 May 1936		
Mr. Patrick A. Kelly	30 January 1932 — 1 September 1933	P. A. KELLY	
G.S. Wilson	19 October 1930 — 29 January 1932		
D. Healy	5 April 1930 — 18 October 1930		
Mr. Patrick A. Kelly	25 November 1927 — 4 April 1930	P. A. KELLY	
D. Healy	26 March 1927 — 24 November 1927		
Mr. Patrick A. Kelly	1 November 1924 — 25 March 1927	P. A. KELLY	
D. Healy	1 March 1924 — 31 October 1924		
Mr. Patrick A. Kelly	1 June 1922 — 29 February 1924	P. A. KELLY	
F.A.M. Vincent	1 December 1920 — 31 May 1922		
I.C. Boyd	3 May 1920 — 30 November 1920		
Maharana Raghubir Singh	21 May 1917 — 2 May 1920	M. R. S.	
F. A. M. Vincent	16 April 1916 — 20 May 1917		
Maharana Raghubir Singh	1 January 1902 — 15 April 1916	M. R. S.	
Hartly Kennedy	9 January 1899 — 31 December 1901		
Robert Hampe-Vincent	9 April 1893 — 8 January 1899		
Col W. H. Wilson	4 July 1888 — 8 April 1893		

== See also ==
- Commissioner of Pune City Police
- Police Commissioner of Bangalore
- Police Commissioner of Delhi
- Police Commissioner of Kolkata
- Commissioner of Police, Hyderabad City
