= Raviwar Peth =

Locality in cities of Maharashtra

Raviwar Peth is a general term, in the Marathi language, for a locality in the Indian cities. These include cities like Pune, Solapur, Madhavnagar, Karad, Ahmednagar, etc. The term Raviwar has derived from the day Sunday in Marathi.
