= Pisawali =

Village in Maharashtra, India

Pisawali Pisavli
- Location within Maharashtra Location within India
- Coordinates: 19°12′54″N 73°07′34″E
- Country: India
- State: Maharashtra
- District: Thane
- Taluk: Kalyan

Government
  - Type: Sarpanch

Area
  - Total: 1.88 km^{2} (0.73 sq mi)
- Elevation: 20 m (66 ft)

Population (2011)
  - Total: 31,202
  - Density: 16,600/km^{2} (43,000/sq mi)

Languages
  - Local: Marathi, Sindhi, Hindi
- Time zone: UTC+5:30 (IST)
- PIN: 421306
- STD code: 0251
- Vehicle registration: MH-05

Pisawali, also known as Pisavli, is a village in Kalyan taluka of Thane district, in the Maharashtra state of India. It is situated on the outskirts of the city Kalyan, about 3 kilometres south of the city center. Its population was 31,202 according to the 2011 census.

== Geography ==
Pisawali is located to the east of Ulhas River, with the State Highway 76 passing through its western side. The village covers an area of 188 hectares.

== Demographics ==
As of 2011, the reported population of Pisawali was 31,202, of whom 17,522 were male and 13,680 were female. The working population constituted 40.24% of the total population. The literacy rate was 74.49%, with 13,904 of the male population and 9,338 of the female population being literate.
