= Jai Bhagwan Goyal =

Indian politician

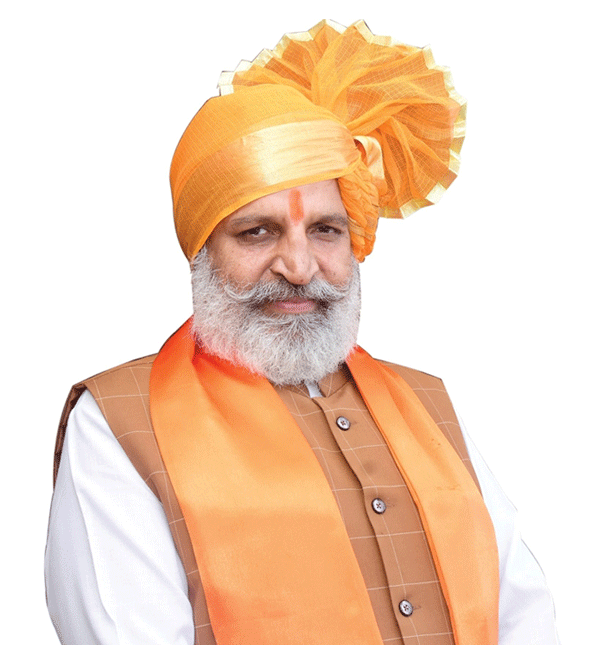
- Portrait of Jai Bhagwan Goyal

Bharatiya Janata Party & Rashtrawadi Shiv Sena

Personal details
- Born: 6 October 1959 (age 66) Ludhiana, India
- Party: Bharatiya Janata Party
- Occupation: Politician
- Profession: Political & Social Worker.
- Website: www.jaibhagwangoyal.in

Jai Bhagwan Goyal (born 6 October 1959) is an Indian politician affiliated with the Bharatiya Janata Party (BJP). He is also a National President of Rashtrawadi Shiv Sena.

== Early life ==
Jai Bhagwan Goyal was born in Ludhiana, Punjab to Shri Hari Ram Goyal and Smt Pista Devi. He is a Hindu and belongs to the Bania community.

== Political career ==
Jai Bhagwan Goyal is currently a member of the Bharatiya Janata Party. He was a member of Shiv Sena Punjab District from 1982 to 1987. Later he was appointed as Shiv Sena's North Delhi Head (1988 to 1990). To see the capability and ability of Jai Bhagwan Goyal, he was appointed as National Chief of Northeast and Delhi Shiv Sena in 1990 (1990 to 2008). During his lifetime he worked for people in any manner dedicated. Later in 2008 Jai Bhagwan Goyal quit Shiv Sena due to the inhuman treatment meted out to North Indians in Maharashtra. Later he created his own party Rashtrawadi Shiv Sena in 2008 with the help of his supporters and became National President of Rashtrawadi Shiv Sena. In Feb 2014, Jai Bhagwan Goyal joined the Bhartiya Janata Party with thousands of his supporters.

== Personal life ==
Jai Bhagwan Goyal is married to Usha Goyal, and together they have three sons who are all businessmen in Delhi.
