= Anami Narayan Roy =

Director General of Police, Maharashtra

Anami Narayan Roy was the Director General of Police, Maharashtra, India and the former Police Commissioner of Mumbai.

His reappointment as DGP was announced by the Government of Maharashtra on 22 January 2010.

== Controversial and sudden appointment as Mumbai police chief ==
Roy took charge as the Police Commissioner of Mumbai in February 2004 after the Government of Maharashtra "suddenly" transferred 3 police commissioners including that of Mumbai, P. S. Pasricha. At that time, Roy was serving as the Police Commissioner of Pune. Pasricha was caught unawares by this development and said that he was "very sad that he didn't get the time to implement his plans and ideas". Pasricha had served as Police Commissioner of Mumbai for just 3 months. Home Minister of Maharashtra, R R Patil clarified that the reason for the "transfer" was that Pasricha was being promoted and hence could not remain as the Police Commissioner. Pasricha publicly disagreed that he could not stay on as Police Commissioner due to his promotion and cited the example of M N Singh and Roni Mendosa who served as police commissioner of Mumbai even after reaching the level of director general. Pasricha was in the process of "cleaning up" the police force after the "Telgi scam". In the process he had transferred more than 2,000 officers and constables. Pasricha even told the media that he had "paid a very heavy price for taking on the system. I have been used and thrown out."

Bharatiya Janata Party state general secretary Vinod Tawde was even quoted as saying that "Roy is consider [sic] to be very close to Nationalist Congress Party chief Sharad Pawar. We will oppose the change."

A city lawyer introduced a public interest litigation in Bombay High Court challenging the sudden transfer of Pasricha.

== Tenure as Mumbai police chief ==
Roy's appointment whether deliberately or indeliberately resulted in the shifting of public and media attention from the "Telgi scam" to the moral policing agenda of home minister R R Patil apart from other neglected matters such as betting.

Early in his tenure, Roy conducted a "major crackdown" raiding 52 bars across the city in just 1 night which resulted in arrests of 1500 people including bar girls, bar owners and patrons on charges of obscenity, prostitution and illegal liquor consumption.

On 9 March 2004, a special court asked Roy to look into a complaint against "encounter specialist" Daya Nayak for his alleged underworld links and decide whether to sanction prosecution under the Maharashtra Control of Organised Crime Act. Mr. A. N. Roy now serves as Director of HDFC bank Ltd.
