= Deaths in November 2008 =

The following is a list of notable deaths in November 2008.

Entries for each day are listed alphabetically by surname. A typical entry lists information in the following sequence:

- Name, age, country of citizenship at birth, subsequent country of citizenship (if applicable), reason for notability, cause of death (if known), and reference.

== November 2008 ==
=== 1 ===
- Badaró, 74, Brazilian-Portuguese actor and comedian, stomach cancer.
- Jimmy Carl Black, 70, American Cheyenne drummer and vocalist (The Mothers of Invention), lung cancer.
- Dermot Curtis, 76, Irish footballer (Bristol City, Ipswich Town, Republic of Ireland), after long illness.
- David de Caires, 70, Guyanese journalist and editor, founder of Stabroek News, complications from heart attack.
- Flockton Grey, 28, British racehorse, heart attack.
- Oscar Lathlin, 61, Canadian politician, member of the Legislative Assembly of Manitoba since 1990.
- Nathaniel Mayer, 64, American rhythm & blues singer, stroke.
- Jacques Piccard, 86, Belgian-born Swiss oceanographer and explorer.
- Rosetta Reitz, 84, American jazz historian and record company founder, cardiopulmonary disease.
- Jack Reno, 72, American country music singer, brain cancer.
- Shakir Stewart, 34, American vice president of Def Jam Recordings, suicide by gunshot.
- Yma Sumac, 86, Peruvian soprano, cancer.
- Tan Jiazhen, 99, Chinese geneticist, multiple organ dysfunction syndrome.
- Tony Tarracino, 92, American saloon keeper and politician, heart and lung ailments.

=== 2 ===
- Ahmed al-Mirghani, 67, Sudanese politician, President (1986–1989).
- Joseph Alliluyev, 63, Russian cardiologist, grandson of Joseph Stalin.
- James Armsey, 90, American automotive executive, director of the Ford Foundation (1960–1967).
- George F. Grant, 102, American angler, author and conservationist, natural causes.
- Kenneth P. Johnson, 74, American newspaper editor (Dallas Times Herald), heart infection.
- Jim Koleff, 55, Canadian hockey player and coach, cancer.
- Domenico Leccisi, 88, Italian politician, stole corpse of Benito Mussolini, heart and respiratory disease.
- Henry Loomis, 89, American Director of Voice of America (1958–1965), Alzheimer's, Parkinson's and Pick's diseases.
- Jacques Lunis, 85, French Olympic silver medal-winning (1948) athlete.
- Elijah Mudenda, 81, Zambian politician, Prime Minister (1975–1977).
- Bill Stall, 71, American Pulitzer Prize-winning journalist (Los Angeles Times), complications from pulmonary disease.
- Terence Tolbert, 44, American political campaign director for Barack Obama in Nevada, heart attack.

=== 3 ===
- John Adams, 89, British rear admiral.
- Charles T. Cross, 86, American diplomat, Ambassador to Singapore (1969–1972), Consul General in Hong Kong (1974–1977).
- Mike Davis, 68, American boating advocate.
- Alan Ford, 84, American Olympic swimmer, emphysema.
- Jean Fournet, 95, French conductor.
- Brooks Mileson, 60, British football club owner (Gretna F.C.), complications from chronic fatigue syndrome and brain infection.
- Lalit Mohan Sharma, 80, Indian jurist, Chief Justice (1992–1993).
- Edward Sheehan, 78, American foreign correspondent, allergic reaction to medication.
- Lhofei Shiozawa, 67, Brazilian judoka.
- Josep Maria Socías, 71, Spanish lawyer and politician, Mayor of Barcelona (1976–1979).
- Cecil W. Stoughton, 88, American Presidential photographer (Kennedy, Johnson), complications from hip replacement.
- John Trudeau, 81, American music promoter, founder of the Britt Festival, heart failure.
- Tuba Man, 53, American tuba player, bludgeoned.
- I. Bernard Weinstein, 78, American cancer researcher, kidney disease.

=== 4 ===
- Khertek Anchimaa-Toka, 96, Russian politician, chairman of Tuvan Parliament (1940–1944), world's first female head of state.
- Evelio Arias Ramos, 42, Mexican actor, comedian and singer.
- Ernesto Aura, 68, Spanish voice actor, cancer.
- Lennart Bergelin, 83, Swedish tennis player and coach, heart failure.
- Paddy Buckley, 83, Scottish footballer (Aberdeen, St Johnstone).
- Jheryl Busby, 59, American record executive.
- Gérald Coppenrath, 86, French journalist and Senator (1958–1962) for Tahiti, brother of Hubert and Michel Coppenrath.
- Michael Crichton, 66, American author (Jurassic Park, The Andromeda Strain) and television producer (ER), throat cancer.
- Rosella Hightower, 88, American ballerina, stroke.
- Byron Lee, 73, Jamaican musician and record producer, bladder cancer.
- Syd Lucas, 108, British World War I veteran.
- Juan Camilo Mouriño, 37, Mexican Secretary of the Interior since 2008, plane crash.
- Orlando Owoh, 76, Nigerian musician, stroke.
- José Luis Santiago Vasconcelos, 51, Mexican politician, plane crash.

=== 5 ===
- Ian Anderson, 54, Scottish footballer.
- V. T. Arasu, 82, Singaporean journalist, civil servant, editor and author, pancreatic cancer.
- Věra Černá, 70, Czech Olympic athlete.
- B. R. Chopra, 94, Indian film director (Naya Daur, Dhund, Kanoon).
- Sofron Dmyterko, 91, Ukrainian Greek Catholic bishop of Ivano-Frankivsk.
- Sir Paul Greening, 80, British admiral and courtier.
- Michael Higgins, 88, American actor (Rumble Fish, The Stepford Wives, Swimfan), heart failure.
- Félix Lebuhotel, 76, French cyclist.
- John Leonard, 69, American media and cultural critic, complications from lung cancer.
- Norm Marshall, 89, Canadian broadcaster.
- Clark Miller, 70, American football player, heart attack.
- John Odom, 26, American professional baseball player, accidental drug overdose.

=== 6 ===
- Ronald Davis, 52, American health advocate, president of the AMA (2007–2008), pancreatic cancer.
- Mahmoud Haroon, 88, Pakistani politician and newspaper founder.
- Sir John Hermon, 79, British police officer, Chief Constable of the Royal Ulster Constabulary (1980–1989), Alzheimer's disease.
- Larry James, 61, American track athlete and Olympic gold medalist (1968), cancer.
- Phil Reed, 59, American politician, member of New York City Council (1998–2005), complications of pneumonia from leukemia.
- Joe Wendryhoski, 69, American football player (Los Angeles Rams, New Orleans Saints), cancer and stroke.
- George Winterton, 61, Australian lawyer and professor of constitutional law, cancer.

=== 7 ===
- Carl Allen, 88, American football player.
- Tetsuya Chikushi, 73, Japanese journalist and news anchor, lung cancer.
- José Bezerra Coutinho, 98, Brazilian bishop of Estância.
- Heiko Engelkes, 75, German television journalist (ARD), cancer.
- Hedley Howarth, 64, New Zealand cricketer.
- Wik Jongsma, 65, Dutch actor, cancer.
- Hidetaka Nishiyama, 80, Japanese karate master, cancer.
- Phạm Văn Rạng, 74, Vietnamese footballer (South Vietnam national team).
- Heather Pick, 38, American newscaster (WBNS-TV), breast cancer.
- Jody Reynolds, 75, American singer and guitarist, liver cancer.
- Lyle Williams, 66, American politician, member of the House of Representatives for Ohio (1979–1985), heart attack.
- Abraham Woods, 80, American civil rights leader, cancer.

=== 8 ===
- Bodil Aakre, 86, Norwegian jurist and politician.
- Arne Argus, 83, Swedish newspaper journalist and sports executive.
- Mary Lou Beschorner, 79, American baseball player (AAGPBL)
- James Byrne, 62, Irish musician.
- Richard Fortman, 93, American checkers champion.
- Régis Genaux, 35, Belgian footballer, heart failure due to pulmonary embolism.
- Joe Hyams, 85, American Hollywood columnist and author, coronary artery disease.
- Mieczysław Rakowski, 81, Polish politician, Prime Minister (1988–1989), Workers' Party Chairman (1989–1990), cancer.
- Florence Wald, 91, American nurse, hospice pioneer.

=== 9 ===
- Joanne H. Alter, 81, American activist and politician, cancer.
- Gerald Arthur, 95, Australian cricketer.
- Fernand Goux, 108, French penultimate veteran of World War I.
- Huda bin Abdul Haq, 48, Indonesian terrorist in 2002 Bali bombings, execution by firing squad.
- Anton Huiskes, 80, Dutch Olympic speed skater.
- Hok Lundy, 58, Cambodian National Police Commissioner, helicopter crash.
- Carl D. Keith, 88, American co-inventor of the catalytic converter.
- Miriam Makeba, 76, South African singer ("Pata Pata", "Soweto Blues"), heart attack.
- John Milsum, 83, Canadian control engineer.
- Amrozi bin Nurhasyim, 46, Indonesian terrorist in 2002 Bali bombings, execution by firing squad.
- Preacher Roe, 92, American baseball pitcher (St. Louis Cardinals, Pittsburgh Pirates, Brooklyn Dodgers), colon cancer.
- Stanisław Różewicz, 84, Polish film director (Westerplatte, Birth Certificate).
- Imam Samudra, 38, Indonesian terrorist in 2002 Bali bombings, execution by firing squad.

=== 10 ===
- Sarah Blacher Cohen, 72, American professor of Jewish literature, complications of Charcot-Marie-Tooth disease.
- Kiyosi Itô, 93, Japanese mathematician, respiratory failure.
- Nikola Kavaja, 76, Serbian anti-communist activist and aircraft hijacker, heart attack.
- Li Ximing, 82, Chinese leader of Beijing Communist Party.
- Howard Reig, 87, American television announcer.
- Arthur Shawcross, 63, American serial killer, cardiac arrest.
- Wannes Van de Velde, 71, Belgian singer and artist, leukemia.

=== 11 ===
- Mustafa Şekip Birgöl, 105, Turkish last veteran of the Turkish War of Independence.
- C. Harmon Brown, 78, American physician, pioneer of sports medicine, cancer.
- Tom Hunt, 85, American chairman of Hunt Petroleum, leukemia.
- Ľubomír Kadnár, 67, Czechoslovak Olympic sprint canoer.
- Francisco Lozano, 76, Mexican Olympic cyclist.
- Alessandro Maggiolini, 77, Italian Bishop of Como, lung cancer.
- María Elena Marqués, 83, Mexican actress, heart failure.
- Lasse Sandberg, 84, Swedish writer and illustrator of children's literature.
- Herb Score, 75, American baseball pitcher and broadcaster (Cleveland Indians), after long illness.
- Jack Scott, 85, British weather forecaster, cancer.
- Kanhaiyalal Sethia, 89, Indian poet.

=== 12 ===
- Richard Rhys, 9th Baron Dynevor, 73, British aristocrat and patron of the arts, cancer.
- Tim L. Hall, 83, American politician, U.S. Representative from Illinois (1975–1977).
- Catherine Baker Knoll, 78, American politician, Lieutenant Governor of Pennsylvania since 2003, neuroendocrine cancer.
- Vladas Michelevičius, 84, Lithuanian bishop of Vilkaviškis.
- Mitch Mitchell, 61, British drummer (The Jimi Hendrix Experience), natural causes.
- Margaret Moncrieff, 87, British cellist.
- George Morrison, 59, Canadian ice hockey player, brain tumour.
- Rex Neame, 72, English cricketer.
- Serge Nigg, 84, French composer.
- Keith Pruitt, 47, American actor.
- Raymond Routledge, 77, American bodybuilder, AAU Mr. America (1961).

=== 13 ===
- Jules Archer, 93, American author.
- Marcello Fondato, 84, Italian screenwriter (Black Sabbath, Blood and Black Lace) and director (Watch Out, We're Mad!).
- Bette Garber, 65, American photographer, pneumonia.
- Mustapha Oukacha, 75, Moroccan politician, president of the Assembly of Councillors.
- Ian Ridley, 74, Australian footballer (Melbourne Demons), emphysema.
- Paco Ignacio Taibo I, 84, Mexican writer and journalist, pneumonia.

=== 14 ===
- Knut Bjørnsen, 76, Norwegian sports commentator and journalist, pancreatic cancer.
- Michael Eneja, 89, Nigerian Bishop of Enugu.
- Sir Bernard Feilden, 89, British conservation activist and restoration architect.
- Lung Fong, 54, Hong Kong actor, lung cancer,
- Irving Gertz, 93, American composer.
- Christel Goltz, 96, German soprano.
- Kristin Hunter, 77, American writer.
- Adrian Kantrowitz, 90, American physician, performed the first pediatric heart transplant, heart failure.
- Tsvetanka Khristova, 46, Bulgarian athlete, Olympic dual medallist in discus throw, cancer.
- Robert Leith-Macgregor, 91, British World War II pilot.
- Charles Le Quintrec, 82, French poet.
- Shaukat Hussein Mazari, 60, Pakistani politician, heart attack.
- Ajit Kumar Panja, 72, Indian politician, oral cancer.

=== 15 ===
- Glen Brand, 85, American wrestler, Olympic gold medalist (1948).
- Matthew Cianciulli, 66, American politician, member of the Pennsylvania House of Representatives (1977–1979), heart failure.
- Peter Fellgett, 86, British physicist.
- Donald Finkel, 79, American poet, complications from Alzheimer's disease.
- Grace Hartigan, 86, American painter, liver failure.
- Louis Ormont, 90, American psychologist.
- Ivan Southall, 87, Australian children's author, cancer.

=== 16 ===
- Salah al-Deen Hafez, 70, Egyptian writer.
- Bruno Maldaner, 84, Brazilian Bishop of Frederico Westphalen.
- Jan Krugier, 80, Polish born Swiss art dealer and holocaust survivor.
- Luisín Landáez, 77, Venezuelan-Chilean cumbia singer.
- Tony Reedus, 49, American jazz drummer.
- Reg Varney, 92, British comedy actor (On the Buses).

=== 17 ===
- Don Albinson, 86, American industrial designer.
- Peter Aldis, 81, British footballer.
- Yaakov Alperon, 53, Israeli organized crime mobster, car bomb.
- Irv Anderson, 81, American politician.
- Eugene Andolsek, 87, American artistic draughtsman, pneumonia and sepsis.
- Sir James Baddiley, 90, British microbiologist.
- Irving Brecher, 94, American comedy writer, heart attack.
- Ennio De Concini, 84, Italian Academy Award–winning screenwriter (Divorce Italian Style, Black Sunday, War and Peace).
- Debby, 42, Soviet-born Canadian oldest living polar bear, third-oldest known bear, euthanasia due to multiple organ failure.
- Malcolm Dalrymple, 85, British Olympic athlete.
- Jean-Marie Demange, 65, French member of the National Assembly, Mayor of Thionville (1995–2008), suicide by gunshot.
- Jay Katz, 86, German-born American physician and medical ethicist, heart failure.
- Tafadzwa Madondo, 27, Zimbabwean cricketer, motorcycle accident.
- George Stephen Morrison, 89, American admiral, father of Jim Morrison.
- John Napier, 81, American actor.
- Pete Newell, 93, Canadian-born American basketball coach.
- Guy Peellaert, 74, Belgian painter, illustrator and photographer, cancer.
- Floyd Weaver, 67, American baseball player.

=== 18 ===
- Manuel Castro Ruiz, 90, Mexican Roman Catholic prelate, Auxiliary Bishop (1965–1969) and Archbishop (1969–1995) of Yucatán.
- George C. Chesbro, 68, American novelist, heart failure.
- George Green, 81, American NASCAR racing driver.
- Paul H. Todd Jr., 87, American politician, member of the House of Representatives from Michigan (1965–1967).

=== 19 ===
- Farah Weheliye Addo, 68, Somali sports administrator, heart attack.
- Ameer Faisal Alavi, 54, Pakistani general, shot.
- Chester Anderson, 90, American football and wrestling coach.
- Clive Barnes, 81, American theatre and dance critic, liver cancer.
- Karl Bissinger, 94, American photographer.
- Carole Caldwell Graebner, 65, American tennis player, cancer.
- John Michael Hayes, 89, American screenwriter (Rear Window, BUtterfield 8, To Catch a Thief).
- Norman McVicker, 68, English cricketer.
- M. N. Nambiar, 89, Indian actor, after short illness.
- Edel von Rothe, 83, German ballerina,

=== 20 ===
- Teresa Amuli, 61, Mozambican politician, brain tumor.
- Raffaele Andreassi, 84, Italian film director.
- Seth Anthony, 93, Ghanaian soldier and diplomat.
- Aurora Correa, 78, Spanish-born Mexican exiled, writer and educator.
- Boris Fyodorov, 50, Russian politician and banker, stroke.
- Bennie Gonzales, 84, American Southwestern-style architect (Heard Museum), Alzheimer's disease.
- Betty James, 90, American businesswoman, co-founder of the Slinky company, wife of Richard T. James.
- Bob Jeter, 71, American football player (Green Bay Packers, Chicago Bears), heart attack.
- Jan Machulski, 80, Polish actor (Vabank), heart attack.
- Jim Mattox, 65, American politician, member of the House of Representatives (1977–1983), Texas Attorney General (1983–1991).
- June Vincent, 88, American actor.

=== 21 ===
- Jules Aarons, 87, American space physicist.
- Jimmy Abson, 88, Canadian football player.
- Augustus Barber, 87, American businessman, cardiac arrest.
- Giacomo Bozzano, 75, Italian Olympic boxer.
- Marco Allen Chapman, 37, American convicted murderer, execution by lethal injection.
- Tom Gish, 82, American journalist and publisher, kidney failure and heart problems.
- Gleb Plaksin, 83, French-born Russian actor.
- Andrew Rowe, 73, British politician, MP for Faversham and Mid Kent (1983–2001), prostate cancer.

=== 22 ===
- Garnet Bougoure, 85, Australian jockey.
- MC Breed, 37, American rapper, kidney failure.
- Alan Gordon, 64, American songwriter ("Happy Together").
- Mario Fernando Hernández, 41, Honduran politician, Deputy Speaker of the National Congress, shot.
- Ibrahim Nasir, 82, Maldivian President (1968–1978).
- Rashid Rauf, 27, British-born Pakistani al-Qaeda terrorist, air strike.
- Sandy Ruby, 67, American entrepreneur, founder of Tech Hifi and Computer City, diabetes.
- Ted Wykes, 87, Australian cricket umpire, cancer.

=== 23 ===
- Ahmad Aghalou, 59, Iranian actor.
- Richard Hickox, 60, British conductor, heart attack.
- Jean Markale, 80, French writer and poet.
- Fred McAlister, 80, American baseball scout (St. Louis Cardinals).
- Mihail Velsvebel, 82, Estonian Olympic athlete.

=== 24 ===
- Charlotte Armstrong, 84, American baseball player (AAGPBL)
- Tom Burgess, 82, Canadian baseball player and coach, cancer.
- Frank Cieciorka, 69, American graphic artist and anti-war activist, emphysema.
- Richey Edwards, 27, British musician (Manic Street Preachers), declared dead on this date (missing since February 1995).
- Bep Guidolin, 82, Canadian ice hockey player and coach.
- Michael Lee, 39, British rock drummer, seizure.
- Kenny MacLean, 52, Canadian bassist (Platinum Blonde), heart attack.
- Ray Perrault, 82, Canadian politician, Senator (1973–2001), Liberal Leader of Senate (1974–1982), Parkinson's disease.
- John Frederick Powell, 93, British air marshal.
- Stefan Schörghuber, 47, German brewing magnate, heart failure.
- John R. Stallings, 73, American mathematician.
- Cecil H. Underwood, 86, American politician, Governor of West Virginia (1957–1961, 1997–2001).

=== 25 ===
- Sunday Ajibade Adenihun, 69, Nigerian politician, heart attack.
- William Dowd, 86, American harpsichord maker.
- Beno Eckmann, 91, Swiss mathematician.
- Ruth Alice Erickson, 95, American Director of the Navy Nurse Corps (1962–1966), pneumonia.
- Christian Fechner, 64, French film producer.
- Helmut Friedlaender, 95, German-born American book collector.
- William Gibson, 94, American playwright (The Miracle Worker).
- Leonard Goodwin, 93, British pharmacologist.
- Randy Gumpert, 90, American baseball player.
- David M. Jones, 94, American Air Force officer, Doolittle Raider.
- George Keegan, 80, Australian politician, heart attack.
- Max Oppy, 84, Australian footballer (Richmond).
- Brian Pearce, 93, British Marxist historian and translator.
- Dudley Savage, 88, British BBC radio presenter.
- Gerald Schoenfeld, 84, American theater impresario.
- Antanas Vaičius, 82, Lithuanian Roman Catholic prelate, Apostolic Administrator (1982–1989) and Bishop (1989–2001) of Telšiai.

=== 26 ===
- Kees Aarts, 66, Dutch soccer player.
- Bob Blake, 94, American ice hockey player.
- Ralph Burkei, 51, German television producer, fall.
- Edna Parker, 115, American supercentenarian, oldest validated living person.
- Edwin Ernest Salpeter, 83, Austrian-born American astrophysicist, leukemia.
- De'Angelo Wilson, 29, American actor (8 Mile, Antwone Fisher, The Salon), suicide by hanging.
- Yang Jia, 28, Chinese mass murderer, execution by lethal injection.
- Vitaly Karayev, 46, Russian mayor of Vladikavkaz.
- Notable people killed in the 2008 Mumbai attacks:
  - Ashok Kamte, 43, Indian additional commissioner of Mumbai Police.
  - Hemant Karkare, 54, Indian chief of the Mumbai Anti Terrorist Squad.
  - Vijay Salaskar, 51, Indian encounter specialist with Mumbai Police.
  - Loumia Hiridjee, 46, Malagasy-born French businesswoman.
  - Gavriel Holtzberg, 29, Israeli-born American rabbi.
  - Andreas Liveras, 73, Cypriot-born British business tycoon.

=== 27 ===
- Adi Da, 69, American-born Fijian artist.
- George MacPherson Docherty, 97, British-born American clergyman.
- Armand Fabella, 78, Filipino educator, Secretary of Education (1992–1994).
- Gideon Gechtman, 66, Israeli artist, heart failure.
- Gil Heron, 87, Jamaican footballer.
- Paul Hibbert, 56, Australian cricketer.
- Cullen Hightower, 84, American author of quips and quotes.
- Frances Janssen, 82, American baseball player (AAGPBL).
- Patricia Marand, 74, American actress, brain cancer.
- Andrew McKelvey, 74, American founder of Monster.com, pancreatic cancer.
- Mike Minogue, 85, New Zealand politician, MP (1976–1984), cancer.
- Verne Orr, 92, American politician, Secretary of the Air Force (1981–1985).
- Pekka Pohjola, 56, Finnish bassist and composer.
- Vishwanath Pratap Singh, 77, Indian Prime Minister (1989–1990), blood cancer and renal failure.
- Andy Tomasic, 90, American football and baseball player.
- Cornelius Clarkson Vermeule III, 83, American scholar of Greek and Roman art, complications from a stroke.

=== 28 ===
- Alan Abbott, 82, English cricketer.
- Raja Perempuan Budriah, 84, Queen of Malaysia (1960–1965).
- Bill Finnegan, 80, American television and film producer (The Fabulous Baker Boys, Hawaii Five-O), Parkinson's disease.
- John Harryson, 82, Swedish actor and entertainer.
- Joža Karas, 82, Polish-born American musician and teacher.
- Sir Hugh Laddie, 62, British intellectual property lawyer and High Court judge, cancer.
- Raymond Meyzenq, 73, French cyclist.
- Red Murff, 87, American baseball player (Milwaukee Braves) and scout.
- Víctor Nieto, 92, Colombian founder and director of the Cartagena Film Festival.
- Edoardo Ricci, 80, Italian Bishop of San Miniato.
- German Skurygin, 45, Russian race walker, heart attack.
- Wo Weihan, 59, Chinese biochemist, executed.
- Helena Wolińska-Brus, 89, Polish military prosecutor, pneumonia.
- Robert Zarinsky, 68, American serial killer, pulmonary fibrosis.
- Tukaram Omble, 54, Indian Assistant Sub-Inspector of Mumbai Police, shot.
- Sandeep Unnikrishnan, 31, Major of NSG Commando, shot.
- Gajender Singh Bisht, 36, NSG commando and Havildar, shot.

=== 29 ===
- Bill Drake, 71, American radio programmer.
- Ulises Dumont, 71, Argentine actor, heart problems.
- Arthur Kantrowitz, 95, American physicist and engineer.
- Chhabildas Mehta, 83, Indian politician, Chief Minister of Gujarat (1994–1995)
- Sten Rudholm, 90, Swedish jurist, member of the Swedish Academy, natural causes.
- Jørn Utzon, 90, Danish architect (Sydney Opera House), heart attack.
- Georgi Vyun, 54, Russian football player and coach.
- Robert Wade, 87, New Zealand-born British chess champion, pneumonia.

=== 30 ===
- Béatrix Beck, 94, Belgian writer.
- Thomas S. Crow, 74, American military officer, Master Chief Petty Officer of the Navy (1979–1982), cancer.
- Naomi Datta, 86, British bacteriologist.
- Doris Dungey, 47, American financial blogger, ovarian cancer.
- Munetaka Higuchi, 49, Japanese drummer (Loudness), liver cancer.
- Ralph A. Lewin, 87, American biologist.
- Pit Martin, 64, Canadian ice hockey player, drowned.
- Nick George Montos, 92, American felon, oldest inmate in Massachusetts.
- Peter Rees, Baron Rees, 81, British politician, Chief Secretary to the Treasury (1983–1985).
- Miroslav Sláma, 91, Czech Olympic ice hockey player.
