= Saint Theresa Cathedral, Nsukka =

Cathedral in Nsukka, Nigeria

Coordinates: 6.8516°N 7.3929°E

Saint Theresa Cathedral
- Saint Theresa Cathedral
- Location: Nsukka, Enugu State
- Country: Nigeria
- Denomination: Catholic Church
- Tradition: Latin Church

History
- Status: Cathedral
- Dedicated: 20 November 2020

Architecture
- Functional status: Active
- Architectural type: Church

Administration
- Diocese: Nsukka

Clergy
- Bishop: Godfrey Onah

Saint Theresa Cathedral, Nsukka is a Catholic church building, which serves as the seat of the bishop of the Diocese of Nsukka. It was dedicated on 20 November 2020.

== History ==
The cathedral, 5,500 capacity building, was begun in 1991 by Bishop Francis Okobo. It was completed during the episcopacy of Bishop Godfrey Onah. During Okobo's time, he designed the Diocesan Project Support Sunday, where money is raised for the construction of the cathedral. It was dedicated on 20 November 2020.
