= Ernest Anaezichukwu Obodo =

Nigerian Catholic prelate (born 1966)

The Most Reverend Ernest Anaezichukwu Obodo
- Auxiliary Bishop of Enugu, Nigeria
- Church: Catholic Church
- Archdiocese: Roman Catholic Archdiocese of Onitsha
- See: Diocese of Enugu
- Appointed: 25 May 2018
- Installed: 31 August 2018

Orders
- Ordination: 22 July 2000
- Consecration: 31 August 2018 by Antonio Guido Filipazzi

Personal details
- Born: Ernest Anaezichukwu Obodo; 24 October 1966 (age 59) Awha-Imezi, Diocese of Enugu, Enugu State, Nigeria

Styles of Ernest Anaezichukwu Obodo
- Reference style: His Grace; The Most Reverend
- Spoken style: Your Grace
- Religious style: Bishop

Ernest Anaezichukwu Obodo (born 24 October 1966) is a Nigerian Catholic prelate who serves as Auxiliary Bishop of the Roman Catholic Diocese of Enugu, Nigeria, since 25 May 2018. Before that, from 22 July 2000 until 25 May 2018, he served as a priest of the same Catholic See. He was appointed bishop by Pope Francis. His episcopal consecration took place on 31 August 2018. He contemporaneously serves as Titular Bishop of Mediana. On 12 April 2026, he was appointed Apostolic Administrator of the Roman Catholic Diocese of Abakaliki, Nigeria.

== Background and education ==
He was born on 24 October 1966 at Awha-Imezi, Diocese of Enugu, Enugu State, Nigeria. He studied at the Seat of Wisdom Seminary, in Owerri, where he graduated with degrees in Philosophy and Sacred Theology. He also holds a Bachelor's degree in Religious Studies from Imo State University. He went on to earn a Master's degree in Religious Studies from Abia State University. His Doctorate in Theology with a specialisation in Canon Law, was awarded by the University of Innsbruck in Innsbruck, Austria.

== Priest ==
He was ordained a priest on 22 July 2000 for the Catholic Diocese of Enugu. He served as a priest until 25 May 2018. While a priest, he served in various roles and locations including:

- Vicar at Queen of the Holy Rosary Parish in Ugwuagor from 2000 until 2001.
- Parish priest of Saint Charles Parish, Amechi Idodo from 2001 until 2004.
- Formator at Saint Bernard's Seminary in Nchatancha from 2004 until 2009.
- Secretary of the clergy of Enugu Catholic Diocese from 2004 until 2009.
- Chaplain of the Saint Jude Society from 2004 until 2009.
- Member of the Diocesan Commission for History from 2004 until 2009.
- Studies at the University of Innsbruck, Austria leading to the award of a doctorate in theology from 2010 until 2016.
- Rector of Saint Bernard's Seminary from 2017 until 2018.
- Lecturer at Bigard Memorial Seminary in Enugu from 2017 until 2018.

== Bishop ==
On 25 May 2018, Pope Francis appointed him auxiliary bishop of the Catholic Diocese of Enugu. He was contemporaneously assigned Titular Bishop of Mediana. He was consecrated on 31 August 2018 at the Saint Paul Church, in Ozalla, Diocese of Enugu. The Principal Consecrator was Antonio Guido Filipazzi, Titular Archbishop of Sutrium assisted by Valerian Maduka Okeke, Archbishop of Onitsha and Callistus Chukwuma Valentine Onaga, Bishop of Enugu. On 12 April 2026, following the death of Bishop Peter Nworie Chukwu, Pope Leo XIV appointed Bishop Ernest Anaezichukwu Obodo as Apostolic Administrator of the Catholic Diocese of Abakaliki, until a suitable local ordinary is appointed.

== See also ==
- Roman Catholicism in Nigeria

== Succession table ==
Catholic Church titles
Preceded by	Auxiliary Bishop of Enugu (since 25 May 2018)	Succeeded by
