= Diocese of Enugu =

Roman Catholic diocese in Nigeria

Diocese of Enugu Dioecesis Enuguensis
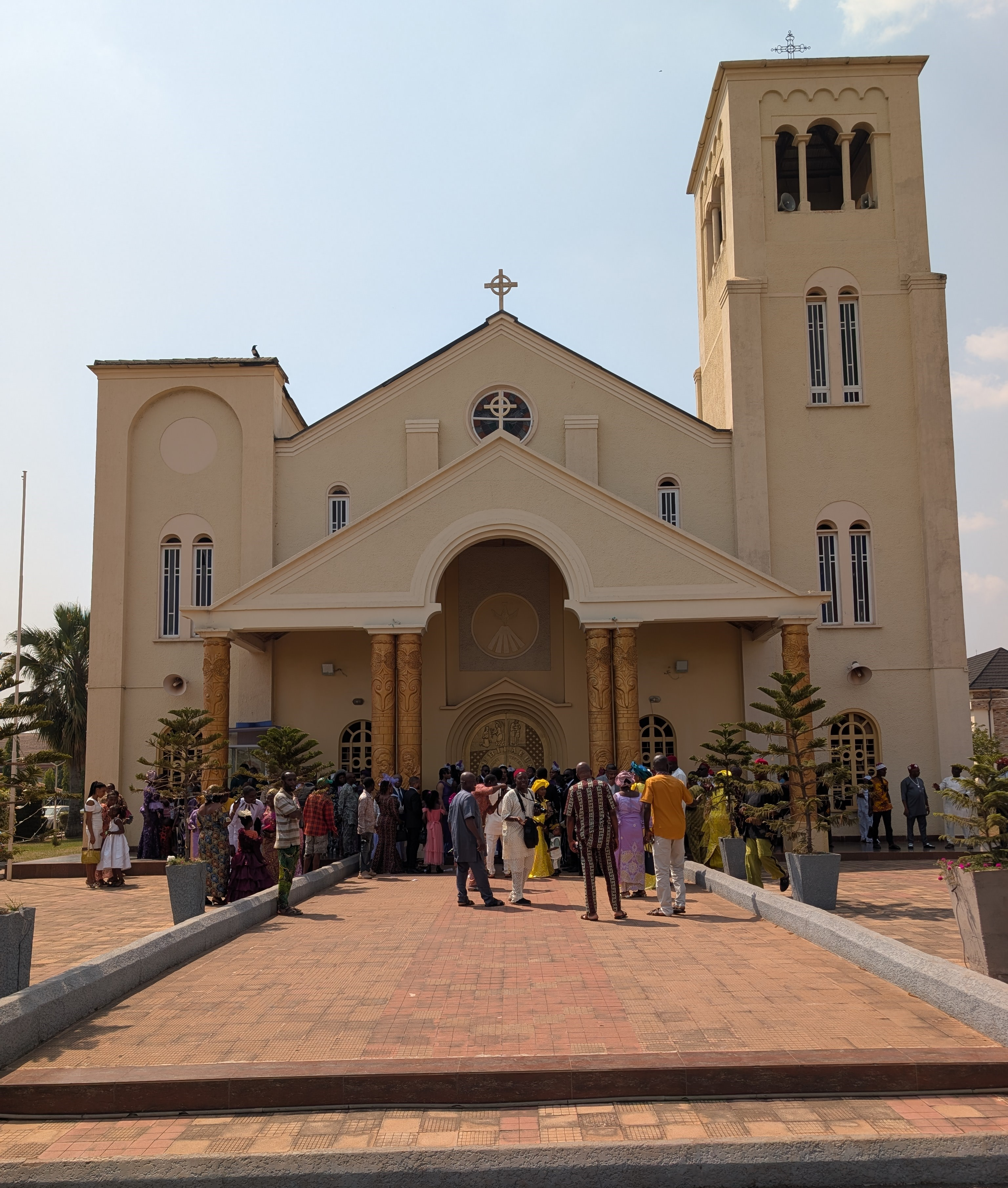
- Holy Ghost Cathedral

Location
- Country: Nigeria
- Territory: a portion of Enugu State
- Ecclesiastical province: Onitsha
- Metropolitan: Onitsha
- Coordinates: 6°27′9.60″N 7°30′37.20″E

Statistics
- Area: 2,738 km^{2} (1,057 sq mi)
- Population: Total; Catholics: (as of 2022); 2,203,375; 1,396,970 (63.4%)
- Parishes: 210

Information
- Denomination: Roman Catholic
- Rite: Latin Rite
- Established: November 12, 1962
- Co-cathedral: Holy Ghost Cathedral in Enugu
- Secular priests: 540

Current leadership
- Pope: Leo XIV
- Bishop: Most Rev. Callistus Valentine Onaga
- Auxiliary Bishops: Ernest Anaezichukwu Obodo
- Bishops emeritus: Anthony Okonkwo Gbuji

Map
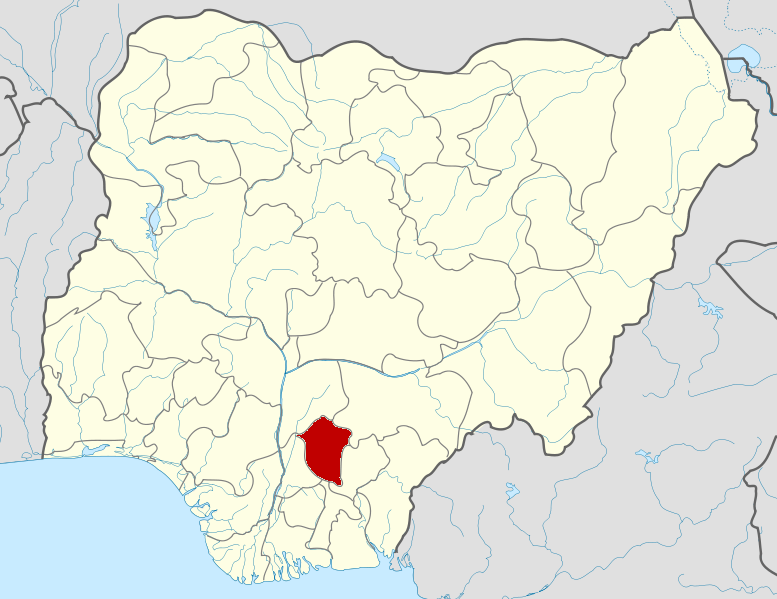
- The city of Enugu is located in Enugu State which is shown here in red.

Website
- www.catholicdioceseenugu.org.ng

The Roman Catholic Diocese of Enugu (Latin: Enuguen(sis)) is a diocese located in the city of Enugu in the ecclesiastical province of Onitsha in Nigeria.

== History ==
On November 12, 1962, the Diocese of Enugu was erected from ecclesiastical territory gained from the Metropolitan Archdiocese of Onitsha. On July 8, 2005, Enugu lost territory to the new Diocese of Awgu.

== Special churches ==
The cathedral is Holy Ghost Cathedral in Enugu.

== Bishops ==
- Bishops of Enugu (Roman Rite):
  - Bishop John Cross Anyogu (1962.11.12 – 1967.07.05)
  - Bishop Godfrey Okoye, C.S.Sp. (1970.03.07 – 1977.03.17)
  - Bishop Michael Ugwu Eneja (1977.11.10 – 1996.11.08)
  - Bishop Anthony Okonkwo Gbuji (1996.11.08 - 2009-09-05)
  - Bishop Callistus Valentine Onaga

=== Auxiliary Bishop ===
- Ernest Anaezichukwu Obodo (2018-)

=== Other priests of this diocese who became bishops ===
- Francis Emmanuel Ogbonna Okobo, appointed Bishop of Nsukka in 1990
- John Ifeanyichukwu Okoye, appointed Bishop of Awgu in 2005
- Godfrey Igwebuike Onah (priest here, 1984–1990), appointed Bishop of Nsukka in 2013
