= Badaro (disambiguation) =

Badaro is a residential neighbourhood and business hub in Beirut, Lebanon.

Badaro and Badaró may also refer to

- Badaró or Manlio Hedair Badaró (1933–2008), Portuguese actor and comedian
- Clea Badaro (1913–1968), Egyptian painter and designer
- Líbero Badaró (1798–1830), Italian Brazilian physician, botanist, journalist and politician

== See also ==
- Francisco Badaró, municipality in the state of Minas Gerais
