= Andolsek =

Andolsek is a habitational surname for someone from the village of Andol in Lower Carniola. In North America, the surname may also be from Andoljšek. Notable people with the surname include:

- Eric Andolsek (1966–1992), American football player
- Eugene Andolsek (1921–2008), American draughtsman
