= Anthony Gbuji =

Nigerian bishop emeritus (born 1931)

Anthony Okonkwo Gbuji
- Bishop Emeritus of Enugu
- Church: Catholic Church
- Diocese: Diocese of Enugu
- In office: 8 November 1996 – 9 February 2009
- Predecessor: Michael Eneja
- Successor: Callistus Valentine Onaga
- Other post: Apostolic Administrator of Benin City (2010-2011)
- Previous post: Bishop of Issele-Uku (1973-1996)

Orders
- Ordination: 23 November 1958
- Consecration: 30 September 1973 by Anthony Olubunmi Okogie

Personal details
- Born: 29 October 1931 (age 94) Ubulu Uku, Benin Province, Western Region, Colony and Protectorate of Nigeria, British Empire

Anthony Okonkwo Gbuji (born 29 October 1931) is a Nigerian Roman Catholic prelate, who served as a bishop of Diocese of Enugu from 1997 to 2009. He was ordained priest on 23 November 1958 at Propaganda Fidei Chapel, Rome by Pietro Cardinal Agaginian the Prefect of the Congregation. Gbuji is a doctor of Canon Law.

== Background and education ==
Anthony Gbuji was born in 1931 to Alexander Gbuji who was a Catechist and his mother Agness both with roots to Akwukwu-Igbo in Oshimili North Local Government Area in present Delta State. Gbuji was born in the premises of St Charles Catholic Church, Ubulu-Uku where his mother was participating in some religious activities. He started his primary education in 1938 at St. Raphael Catholic School Akwukwu-Igbo and later transferred to St. Theresa Catholic School Onicha-Olona where he had to travel for five kilometers to school daily. Later, Fr. Abraham Ojefua who was working at the Onicha-Olona Parish brought Gbuji to the parish house where he stayed throughout his primary education. At the parish house, he was in close contact with several priests such as Paul Emechete and J. C. Lyons SMA, and seminarians whose lives inspired Gbuji to join priesthood. He attended St. Theresa Minor Seminary Oke Are, Ibadan from 1947 to 1951 for his secondary education.

In 1952, he enrolled in St. Paul's Major Seminary, Benin-City where he studied Philosophy graduation in 1954. In 1954, while on pastoral work Agbor, his local ordinary, Bishop Kelly sent message to him to get prepared for further studies in Rome. He left for Rome in 1955 with two other seminarians P. G. Ugboko who later became Monsignor and first indigenous rector of Saints Perter and Paul Major Seminary, Bodija, Ibadan and Francis Arinze who became a Cardinal.

== Priestly career ==
Gbuji was ordained priest on 23 November 1958 at Propaganda Fidei Chapel, Rome by Pietro Cardinal Agaginian the Prefect of the Congregation. He received his Licentiate in Theology from Urbaniana Universitas Roma in 1959, one year after his ordination. He studied for a doctorate degree in Canon Law at the same university finishing in 1962. He earned a Diploma in French from Institute Catholique Paris in 1962 and a Diploma in Education from the University of London in 1963.

Gbuji returned to Nigeria in 1963 and worked in Fugar- a remote area in Benin Diocese from 1963 to 1966 when he was transferred to St. Paul's Minor Seminary, Benin-City working under Fr. Murphy who was one of his professors during his Philosophy studies at St. Paul's Major Seminary. Following the outbreak of the Nigeria Civil War in 1967, Gbuji was put in-charge of refugees. When the fighting got closer to the refugee camps in Benin City, his bishop instructed him to move Igbo ethnic refugees who were the major targets in the war to Asaba area. This infuriated the Nigerian troops forcing Gbuji to limit his movement until he was cleared by the troops. In 1968, he was appointed head of St. Thomas Teachers’ Training College Ibusa as foreign missionaries left the institution due to the war. As the school came under attack, he relocated it to a safer place in Issele-Uku town until the end of the war. After the war, Gbuji began rebuilding the damaged infrastructure in school.

On 5 July 1973, Catholic Diocese of Issele-Uku was created and Gbuji was appointed bishop of the diocese. He received his episcopal consecration on 30 September 1973. Running the new diocese was difficult due to lack of priests, fewer Catholic population in the area and the effect of the civil war that had just ended. At this time, the Baptist Church headed by Reverend Martins was strong in the area. Rev. Martins welcomed and gave some assistance to bishop Gbuji who stayed in a classroom for eight months until bishop house was completed. The development of the diocese was supported by donations from the indigens, Rome and the government of General Samuel Ogbemudia.

On 8 November 1996, he was transferred to Enugu Diocese and installed as the bishop of the diocese on 8 February 1997. In 2001, he established St. Paul International Institute of Evangelization (SPIIEE) which was upgraded to Faculty of Religious Studies in Godfrey Okoye University, Enugu in 2009. He retired from pastoral duties in 2009.
