= John Anyogu =

Nigerian priest

The Most Reverend John Cross Anyogu
- Bishop of Enugu
- Church: Roman Catholic Church
- Diocese: Roman Catholic Diocese of Enugu

Orders
- Consecration: 9 June 1957 by Bishop Shanahan

Personal details
- Born: 2 May 1898 Onitsha, Nigeria
- Died: 5 July 1967 (aged 10) Enugu, Nigeria
- Parents: Jacob Anyogu
- Occupation: Clergy

John Cross Anyogu (2 May 1898 – 5 July 1967) was a Nigerian clergyman who, on 9 June 1957, became the first member of his Igbo community to be consecrated a Catholic priest and later a Catholic bishop. He was also the first Igbo to be ordained a priest in 1930 and the first bishop of the Roman Catholic Diocese of Enugu which was created in 1963, the year of his installation. Through his efforts Enugu became a very important Catholic mission centre overseeing several thousand Christians in and around the town. His parish has the largest concentration of Catholics in Nigeria, second only to Owerri parish.

== Biography ==
He was born on 11 March 1898 in Onitsha, near an early missions settlement on the bank of the River Niger some 96 kilometres from Enugu. His parents, Jacob and Ama Fatima Anyogu, were prominent worshippers at the Onitsha mission where their contribution to its growth, both as a base for European missionaries arriving in Nigeria as well as a training ground for prospective priests, was well known.

Their offspring John was not slow in noticing this dedication for by 1912, when he was only 14 he too had resolved to serve God. "As my new year's resolution," he wrote to his father on 1 January 1912, "I want to serve God all my life. I want to be a priest." His father took the matter up with the European priests at the mission asking whether an African could become a priest. The positive response led to John and his brother Luke being sent to England in March 1913 for training.

John had attended the Holy Trinity School, Onitsha for his elementary education. In 1912 he passed what was then Standard VI as well as the Junior Civil Entrance Examinations, which showed his exemplary brilliance.

In Britain he studied at the Junior Seminary of St. Mary's in Grange-over-Sands in the industrial Lancashire belt. Five years later, he went to Ireland to read philosophy in Dublin and graduated with distinction.

He returned to Nigeria in 1919 to continue his studies for the priesthood at Onitsha; he was among the first crop of priests to graduate from the Igbariam Seminary. In addition to his studies there John Anyogu taught Latin to junior seminarians, using his own quarters as a makeshift classroom. Also during this period, in 1922, he was sent to Ogoja, some 320 kilometres from Onitsha—a distance he did on foot to spread the gospel. Then on 8 December 1930 he was ordained at Onitsha by Bishop Shanahan, at the age of 32, becoming the first priest from Eastern Nigeria.

Father Anyogu was first assigned to the Adazi parish as a curate. He served there for five years before being relocated to take charge of Nnewi parish. In 1940 he went to Idah, a town in the southern part of northern Nigeria, from whence he was posted to Oguta in 1948. The following year Anyogu was transferred to Nteje where, in addition to other mission duties, he taught the Igbo language to Irish priests.

In 1956 he was honoured by the British queen, Elizabeth II, with the Order of the British Empire (OBE). A year later, on 9 June 1957, Father Anyogu was consecrated bishop. Subsequently, he was installed bishop of Enugu on 15 January 1963, the first bishop of the new diocese. Before his death on 5 July 1967, the diocese of Enugu had become an important Catholic centre, not only for the eastern region for which it was the administrative headquarters, but also for Nigeria as a whole.

Other notable siblings: Mother Mary Bernadette Anyogu – founder member of The Sisters of the Immaculate Heart of Mary, Mother of Christ Mother Mary Benedette Anyogu- was the youngest sister of Bishop John Cross Anyogu. First professed sister of the congregation of the Immaculate Heart. of Mary IHM) she made her first solemn vow in 1946 and later became the first mother general of her congregation. She died in 1988.

Marcellina Otigba (née Anyogu) and Grand Matriarch of the Otigba Dynasty. The legacy of the investitures and prestigious OBE award continues in her direct descendants notably : James Otigba (deceased), Felicia Iworah (née Otigba)(deceased), Gregory Otigba (deceased), Brig. Gen (Dr) George Longinus Otigbah rtd.(deceased), Anthony Otigba (deceased), Sebastian Iweka Otigba (deceased), Odilia Nworah (née Otigba)Sunday Henry Otigba, Victor Otigba. grand children Valentine Emeka Otigba and great-grandchildren to date.

Appolonia Nwabuzor (née Anyogu)

== See also ==
- Catholic Church in Nigeria

== Bibliography ==
- Africa Year Book and Who's Who (London: Africa Journal, 1977).
- Africa Today, first edition, (Denver, CO : Africa Today Associates, 1981).
- Africa Who's Who, first edition, 1981.
- Africa Who's Who, second edition, 1991 (published by Africa Books Ltd., U.K).
- Ralph Ewechue (ed.), Makers of Modern Africa, 2nd edition (London: Africa Books, 1991).
- Daily Times of Nigeria (Lagos).
- Nigeria Year Book, 1974, 1975, 1976–1978, 1979, 1980 (Lagos : Nigerian Printing & Publishing Co.).
- S. Decalo, Historical Dictionary of Togo, 3rd ed., (London : Scarecrow Press, 1996).
- Ralph Uweche, Africa Who's Who, 1991 (Lagos, Nigeria: Africa Book Ltd.).
- J. C. Choate, The Voice of Truth International, 1991, Vol. 21 (USA)
- E. EL Hadj-Omar, Who's Who In Africa Dictionary.
- In the Land of the Pharaohs – An introduction to a 1968 case study by Khalil Mahmud, 2nd ed., (London : Cass, 1968).
- L. H. Ofosu-Appiah, Dictionary of African Biography, volume on Ghana & Ethiopia, volume on Sierra Leone & Zaire, (New York : Reference Publications, 1977
- Cyril P. Foray, Historical Dictionary of Sierra Leone (London : Scarecrow Press, 1977).
- Gailey H. A., A History of Sierra Leone.
- I. Geiss, The Pan-African Movement (London : Methuen, 1974).
- L. C. Gwan, Great Nigerians.
- E. Kay (ed.), Dictionary of African Biography (London : Melrose Press, 1971–1972).
- Pan-Vegio Patriot Macdonald- H. Edward Wilmot
- R. K. Rasmussen, Historical Dictionary of Rhodesia Zimbabwe (London : Scarecrow Press, 1979).
- E. Rosenthal, Encyclopaedia of South Africa, 7th ed., (Cape Town : Juta, 1978).
- S. Ramgoolam, Seychelles Government Annual Reports.
- S. Taylor (ed.), The New Africans (London : Paul Hamlyn, 1967).
- V. Thompson and R. Adlof, Historical Dictionary of Congo (London : Scarecrow Press, 1996).
- Times Newspapers Ltd; Obituaries from the Times (Volume 1, 1961–1970; Vol.2, 1971– 1975)
- P. J. Vatikiotis, The History of Egypt, 3rd ed., (London : Weidenfeld and Nicolson, 1985, c1969).
- H. Zell and H. Silver (eds.), A Reader's Guide to African Literature (London : Heinemann, 1972).
- H. Zell, C. H. Bundy and V. Coulon (eds.), A New Reader's Guide to African Literature, rev. ed., (London : Heinemann, 1983).
- Journal of the Historical Society of Nigeria (Ibadan : Ibadan University Press): Vol. V Nos. 2 & 3, 1970, (Adeleye, R. A.).
- Journal of the Historical Society of Nigeria (Ibadan : Ibadan University Press): Vol. VI Nos. 204, 1969, (Ekejiuba, F.).
- Journal of the Historical Society of Nigeria, "A Biographical Sketch," (Omu Okwei), (Ibadan : Ibadan University Press): Vol. III No 4, 1967.
- Journal of African History, (London : Cambridge University Press): Vol. V No 3, 194 (Hopkins A. G.).
- Periodicals and newspapers consulted: Africa (Tunis: Ministère des Affaires Culturelles et de l'Information, 1971 ff). Africa Diary (Delhi: Africa Publications (India), 1961 ff). Africa Research Bulletin (Africa Research Ltd), (Oxford: Blackwell, 1964 ff). Ambassador International (Vol 211; 1985). Commonwealth Currents (1978). Guardian (London, s.n.). Independent (London, s.n.). The Times (London). West Africa (London : West Africa Publishing, 1917).
