= Leicester Racecourse =

Horse racing venue in Oadby, England

Coordinates: 52°35′52″N 1°5′45″W

Leicester
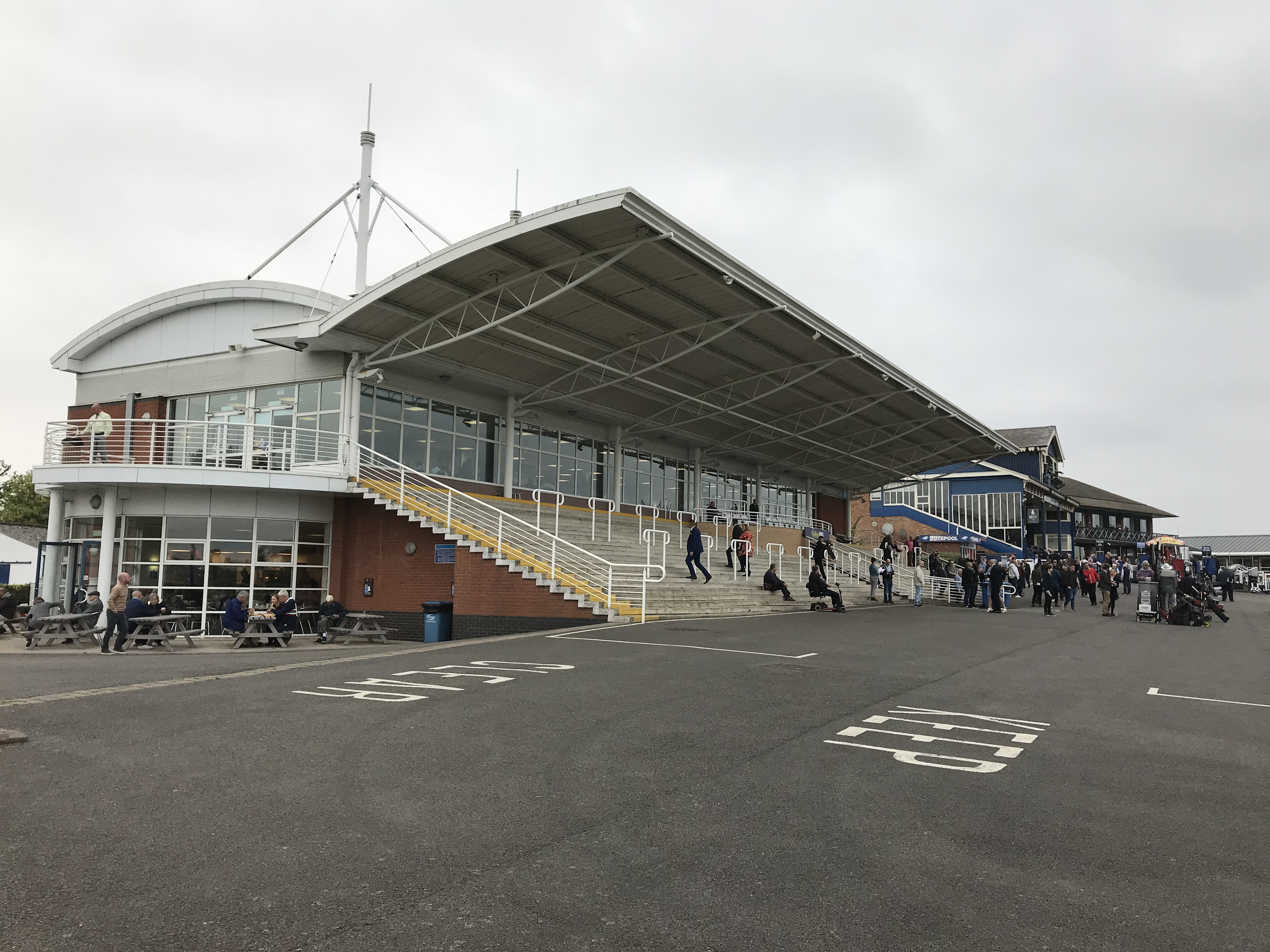
- Grandstands at Leicester Racecourse
- Interactive map of Leicester
- Location: Oadby, Leicestershire
- Owned by: Leicester Racecourse Company Ltd.
- Screened on: Racing TV
- Course type: Flat; National Hunt

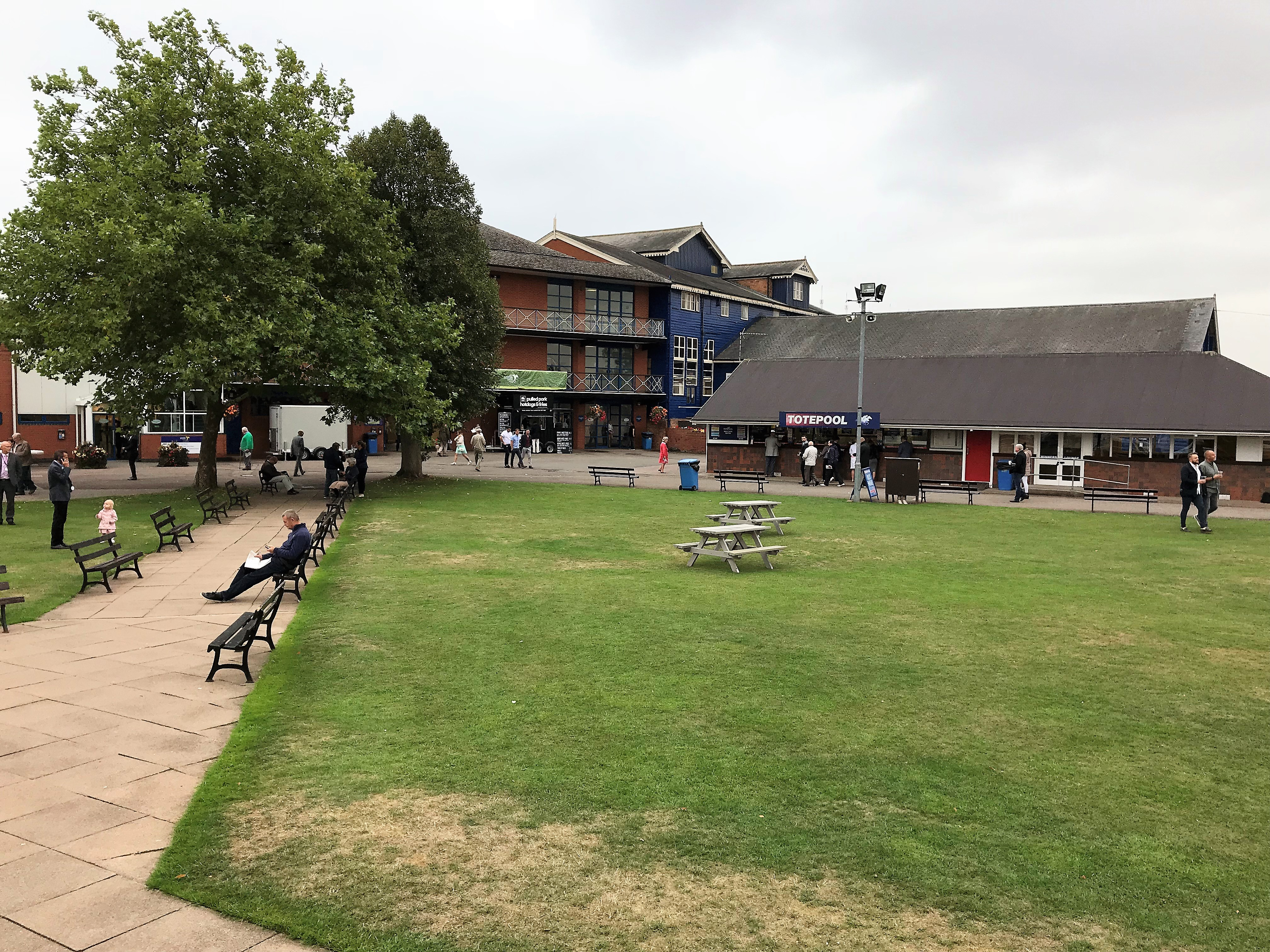
Rear of the grandstands at Leicester Racecourse.

Leicester Racecourse is a horse racing course in Oadby, Leicestershire, about three miles south of Leicester city centre.

== History of horse racing in Leicester ==
The earliest evidence suggests that racing took place at Abbey Meadow, Leicester on 23 March 1603, the day before Queen Elizabeth I died. The highlight of these early meetings was the Corporation Town Plate. This was discontinued towards the end of the century but was re-introduced in 1720. In 1740 meetings were transferred to St. Mary's Field, although racing was still held at Abbey Field. However, in 1742 it was decided to end racing at Abbey Field because of flooding, so St. Mary's Field became the preferred location. In 1807, the Leicester Gold Cup, worth 100 sovereigns, was first run at Victoria Park racecourse. The first meeting at the present racecourse at Oadby took place on 24 July 1883. Victoria Park became a cricket ground, with the grandstand becoming the cricket pavilion.

On 31 March 1921, a young apprentice jockey, Gordon Richards, rode the first winner of his career at Leicester: Gay Lord, trained by Martin Hartigan. He went on to ride a total of 4,870 winners. On Friday 20 January 1931, Golden Miller won his first race, the Gopsall Maiden Hurdle, over 2 miles at Leicester, and worth £83. Ridden by Bob Lyall, Golden Miller started 5/4 favourite and won easily. He came back to Leicester in January 1935 and, ridden by Gerry Wilson, won the Mapperely 'Chase. Golden Miller won five consecutive Cheltenham Gold Cups between 1932 and 1936, and the Grand National in 1934. The Golden Miller Handicap Hurdle is run at Leicester every year in memory of the horse.

The racecourse reached its reputational peak of in the late nineteenth century when it staged some of the most valuable races in the United Kingdom, including the Prince of Wales Stakes and the Portland Stakes, both of which carried more prize money than any of the five British flat-racing Classics in 1889.

Leicester racecourse was the scene of the infamous Flockton Grey ringer case.

== The course ==
It is an oval shaped course of about 1 mile 5 furlongs, with a straight 7 furlong course which joins the round course 4½ furlongs from the winning post. The 7 furlong course runs downhill to half way, uphill for 2 furlongs before levelling out for the last 1½ furlongs. Races are run over distances between 5 furlongs and 1 mile 3 furlongs 183 yards.

The steeplechase course, which is also about 1 mile 5 furlongs, has ten fences. There are six fences, including the water jump and an open ditch, down the back straight, which runs inside the flat course. On the turn to the home straight the steeplechase course switches to the outside. Prior to the 2009/10 National Hunt season, the open ditch, which was jumped as the fourth last fence on the turn from the back straight, was moved to the home straight. The home straight now consists of four fences, with the open ditch taken as the third last fence. Hurdle races are run on the flat course. The last 3 furlongs are uphill, so Leicester presents a stiff test of stamina.

Racing is held on at least 29 days a year at Leicester: 18 Flat, 11 Jumps.
