= Keith Pruitt =

American actor and composer

- Born: Keith Douglas Pruitt; October 12, 1961; Kansas City, Kansas, U.S.
- Died: c. November 12, 2008 (aged 47); Greenwich Village, New York, U.S.
- Education: City University of New York
- Occupations: Actor, composer

Keith Douglas Pruitt (October 12, 1961 – c. November 12, 2008) was an American actor and composer. He was best known for playing Frank Wendall in the American soap opera television series As the World Turns.

== Life and career ==
Pruitt was born in Kansas City, Kansas, the son of Norman Wallace Pruitt, an engineer, and Emma Jean Thompson. He was raised in Annandale, Virginia, and he graduated from Falls Church School. He attended Duke University and the City University of New York, earning his PhD degree. He began his screen career in 1988, appearing in the film Hairspray. From 1990 to 1991, he played Frank Wendall in the CBS soap opera television series As the World Turns.

Later in his career, from 1991 to 1992, Pruitt played Flynn Reilly in the ABC soap opera television series Loving. In 1995, he appeared in an episode of the CBS soap opera television series Guiding Light. Aside from acting, he was a classical composer, and his compositions were performed by the San Jose Symphony, the Florida Philharmonic Orchestra and the New York City Ballet.

== Personal life and death ==
According to the Tyler Morning Telegraph, Pruitt was a homosexual. He was the partner of Jacques Rosas.

On November 12, 2008, Pruitt was found dead at his apartment in Greenwich Village, New York, at the age of 47.
