= Salah al-Deen Hafez =

Salah al-Deen Hafez or Salah Eddin Hafez (Arabic: صلاح الدين حافظ), b. 1938, died 16 November 2008, was an Egyptian writer and journalist. He was married to professor Dr. Nabila Khalifa who is the mother of his children Ehab and Ghada. At the time of his death of cancer, he was the General Secretary of the Union of Arab Journalists.

He was born in Al-Aqlia village, El-Edwa city, El-Minia Governorate, Egypt in 1938 and in 1960 graduated from the School of Arts with a degree in journalism. Upon graduation he started working for both Al Akhbar and At-Ta'awon before moving to Al-Ahram in 1965 and supervising the international edition of the daily called "Al-Ahram ad-Duwali" and was editor-in-chief of the magazine Dirasaat I'lamiyyah (tr. Media Studies).

He was elected as General Secretary of the Union of Egyptian Journalists for periods 1968-1971 and 1973–1977. He was elected as General Secretary of the Union of Arab Journalists for one year in 1976 and after the headquarters were moved from Baghdad, Iraq to Cairo, Egypt, for more than a decade (1996- November 2008) until the time of his death.

Salah Eddin Hafez was also a well-known independent writer with 12 books to his name that tackled subjects of the media, democracy, Arab-Israeli conflict and the Third World amongst others. He was the co-author of The struggle of the great powers over the Horn of Africa (Arabic: صراع القوى العظمى حول القرن الإفريقي). His writings defended the civil rights of the disadvantaged or minorities, tackled many times issues of freedom of expression and social justice. His weekly articles every Wednesday morning were published in Al-Ahram and concurrently in 5 other Arab publications and was at many a time critical of the Arab regimes including those of Egypt.

Many of his family members and relatives worked in journalism because of his positive effect on his family and they're Ehab Hafez, Ahmed Hafez, Alaa al-Deen Hafez, Rasha Hafez, A'rfa Mohamed, Mohamed lotfy, Taha Hafez, joined the Al Borsa News economic newspaper in 2016.

He died of cancer on 16 November 2008 and buried in the region of 6th of October City, in northern Egypt.
