= C. Harmon Brown =

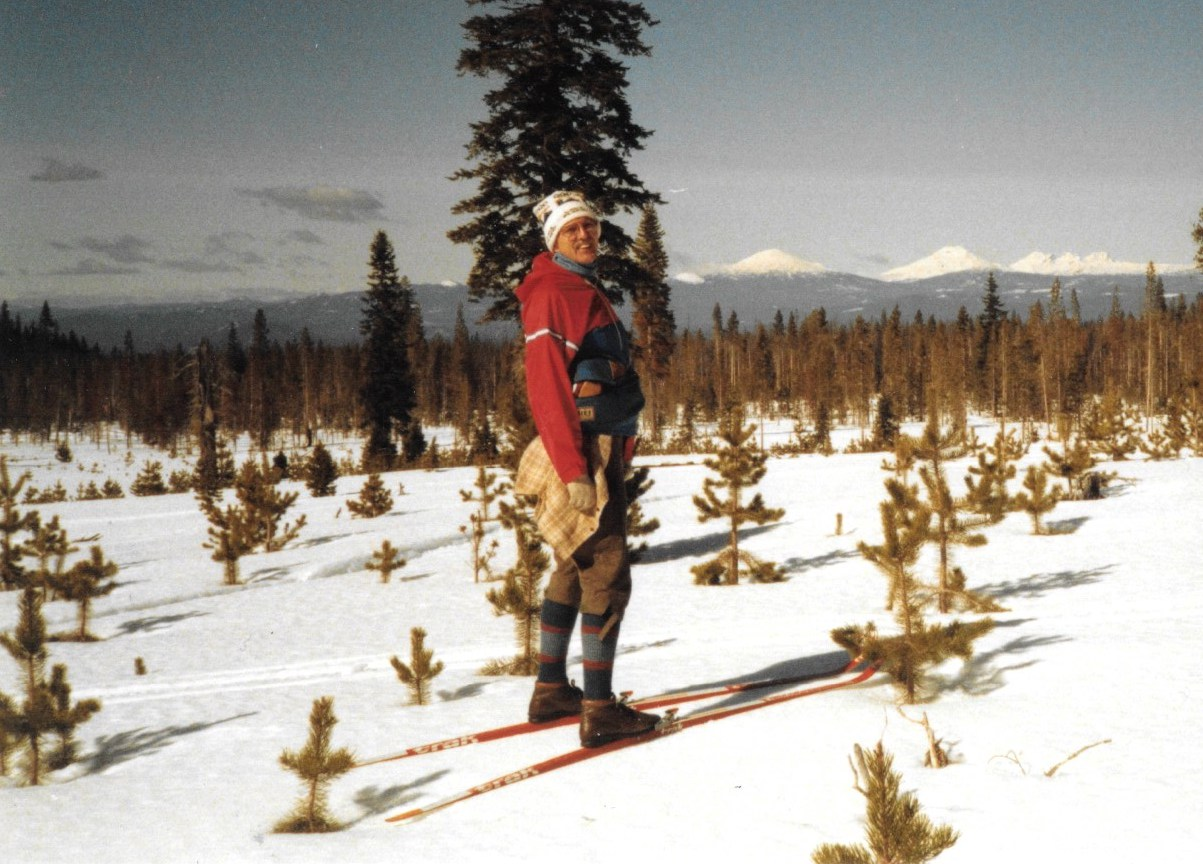
C. Harmon Brown circa 1990

C. Harmon Brown (c. 1930 – November 11, 2008) was an American endocrinologist who was a pioneer in the field of sports medicine. Brown's research studied the effects of rigorous exercise on women.

Brown graduated from Lafayette College in 1952, where he had been the conference champion in hurdling on three occasions and had set two college records, in the 120-yard high hurdles and 220-yard low hurdles. He was awarded his medical degree in 1956 from George Washington University School of Medicine & Health Sciences. He was chief of the medical service at the Veterans Administration hospital in Livermore, California and director of university health services at California State University, Hayward.

With female participation in scholastic sports increasing, Brown was quoted by Time magazine stating that many women may suffer sports injuries, but that "teachers are not equipped to show girls how to gradually improve their physical fitness and cut down on injuries". His research on women participating in athletics showed that different training techniques were needed by women, who he found were more loose-jointed and more susceptible to certain injuries, such as dislocated shoulders. His works on the subject include the 1986 "The Menstrual Cycle and Physical Activity" and 1988's "Sport Science Perspectives for Women".

Brown researched the use of performance-enhancing drugs by athletes and served with the International Association of Athletics Federations and other organizations worldwide to develop anti-doping standards. He started working with the Ladies Professional Golf Association in January 2008 on protocols for testing professional golfers for drug use.

Brown was a long-time college professor, spending four decades at the University of California, San Francisco. He coached athletes at all levels, including the international level, in track and field athletics events such as the discus throw, the javelin throw, and the shot put. He was on the coaching staff of nine American international teams from 1967 to 1986, including United States teams at two Olympics and two Pan American Games.

He was loved by students and athletes at California State University, Hayward.

Brown died at age 78 on November 11, 2008, of cancer. He had lived in San Mateo, California.
