= James Armsey =

- Born: December 13, 1917; Olney, Illinois
- Died: November 2, 2008 (aged 90); Urbana, Illinois
- Education: University of Illinois Urbana-Champaign (BS in Journalism, 1941)

James W. Armsey (December 13, 1917 – November 2, 2008) was an American who served as an executive at the Ford Foundation where he oversaw the distribution of nearly a half billion dollars in grants. Through his efforts in the 1960s, the foundation denied grants to segregated universities, leading to the admission of the first black students at several major universities in the United States.

== Early life ==
Armsey was born in Olney, Illinois, on December 13, 1917, and attended the University of Illinois at Urbana-Champaign where he earned a Bachelor of Science degree in journalism in 1941. He served for five years in the United States Army during World War II as a public relations officer at various posts in the United States and in New Delhi in the India-Burma Theater, and left the Army with the rank of Major. After his military service, he returned to the University of Illinois was awarded a master's degree in political science in 1946.

== Career ==
He was director of public relations at the Illinois Institute of Technology from 1947 to 1952 under the Institute's president Henry T. Heald, and was assistant to the Chancellor of New York University from 1952 to 1956 when Heald moved there. When Dr. Heald took a position with the Ford Foundation, Armsey followed him again.

Armsey was at the Ford Foundation until 1975, in a variety of positions, including as director of its programs in higher education, journalism and public broadcasting. The programs he oversaw distributed grants from the foundation totaling $497 million in foundation grants.

From 1960 to 1967, Armsey was the director of the higher education programs, which gave grants to colleges and universities with few strings attached, other than requirements than the schools raising matching funds from other sources. These grants, which gave $362 million to colleges and universities during this period, were some of the largest offered at the time. The grants included $220 million to 16 private universities, $125 million to a group of 68 liberal arts colleges and $13 million to 13 historically black colleges and universities.

In discussions with the Ford Foundation's President Henry T. Heald in 1962, Armsey urged that the colleges and universities that were recipients of the organization's grants should be required to admit black students. The foundation's board approved the proposal. the new policy was not announced publicly, and all notifications of the affected schools were done in private. As a result of these changes, several schools that had been effectively segregated admitted their first black undergraduate students, including Duke University, Emory University, Tulane University, Vanderbilt University and a number of major private colleges.

The Foundation initiated a program in 1968 with the goal of preparing minority students to become college instructors. Directed by Armsey, the program offered grants to Native American and Mexican-American students studying for doctoral degrees, and was later expanded to include black students. Grants offered through the program totaled $36 million.

== Death ==
Armsey died at age 90 on November 2, 2008, at his home in Urbana, Illinois.
