= Callistus Valentine Onaga =

21st-century Nigerian Catholic bishop

- Bishop of Enugu
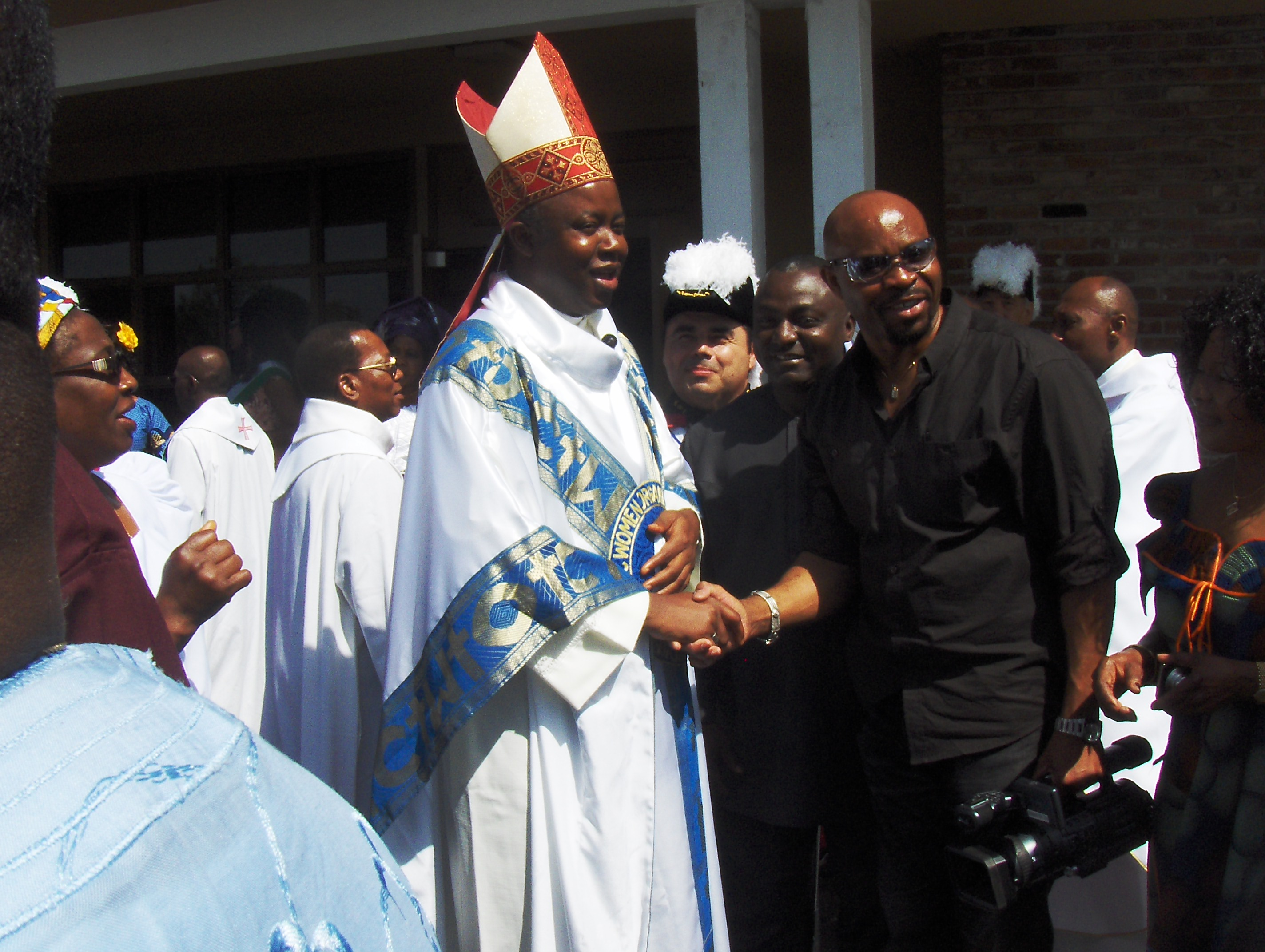
- Bishop Callistus Onaga after celebrating the Igbo Mass to open its eight annual convention in Sacramento, California, on April 24, 2010
- Church: Catholic Church
- Diocese: Diocese of Enugu
- Appointed: 9 February 2009
- Predecessor: Anthony Gbuji

Orders
- Ordination: 8 August 1987
- Consecration: 2 May 2009 by Renzo Fratini

Personal details
- Born: 29 September 1958 (age 67) Agbudu (in present-day Awgu LGA), Eastern Region, Federation of Nigeria, British Empire

Callistus Valentine Onaga, D.D., (born 29 September 1958) is the fifth Roman Catholic Bishop of the Diocese of Enugu.

== Early life and pastoral appointments ==
Callistus Valentine Onaga is the fifth child of Vincent and Victoria Onaga. His mother was the granddaughter of the Paramount Ruler Chief Chukwuani (died 1930) from Ozalla, Nkanu West Local Government Area, Enugu State, Nigeria. Onaga attended St Anthony's Primary School, Agbudu, Nigeria, from 1964 to 1972. He received his secondary education at the Sacred Heart Seminary in Nsude, Nigeria, from 1973 to 1975. He earned his Bachelor of Divinity degree in Sacred Theology from the Urban University in Rome in 1987, and was ordained to the priesthood on 8 August 1987. Within the diocese, Onaga held several positions, including pastor at St. Mary's Church in Enugu, Vicar General, Administrator of Holy Ghost Cathedral, and committee chairman for the inauguration of the Diocese of Awgu.

== Episcopal appointments ==
On 9 February 2009, Onaga was appointed by Pope Benedict XVI as the Enugu diocesan bishop after the resignation of Anthony Okonkwo Gbuji. He was ordained as the Bishop of Enugu on 2 May 2009, by Archbishop Renzo Fratini. His principal co-consecrators were Archbishop Valerian Okeke and Bishop Gbuji. Later that same day, Onaga appointed Monsignor Luke Adike as the diocesan Vicar General, and Very Rev. Fr. Ambrose Chineme Agu as the Diocesan Secretary and Chancellor.

== Appointments ==
Onaga is a member of the Association of Episcopal Conferences of Anglophone West Africa as an ordinary. He is a member of the Catholic Bishops' Conference of Nigeria. At its first Plenary Meeting in 2009, this conference recognized his appointment as a diocesan bishop. As the diocesan bishop, Onaga is the legal holder of its microbank.

== 2010 visit to America ==
Onaga was the guest speaker for the Igbo Catholic Community USA (ICCUSA) Eighth Annual Convention between 23 and 25 April 2010, held in Sacramento, California.

Preceded by Anthony Okonkwo Gbuji	Bishop of Enugu; 2009–present	Succeeded by Incumbent
