= Francis Okobo =

Nigerian Roman Catholic bishop (1936–2025)

His Excellency Francis Emmanuel Ogbonna Okobo
- Bishop Emeritus of Nsukka
- Archdiocese: Onitsha
- Diocese: Nsukka
- Appointed: 19 November 1990
- Term ended: 13 April 2013
- Predecessor: position established
- Successor: Godfrey Igwebuike Onah

Orders
- Ordination: 4 June 1966
- Consecration: 6 January 1991 by Pope John Paul II, Giovanni Battista Re, Justin Francis Rigali

Personal details
- Born: 4 November 1936 Lejja, Colony and Protectorate of Nigeria
- Died: 29 August 2025 (aged 88) Enugu, Enugu State, Nigeria

Francis Emmanuel Ogbonna Okobo (4 November 1936 – 29 August 2025) was a Nigerian Catholic prelate who served as the bishop of the Roman Catholic Diocese of Nsukka from 19 November 1990 to 13 April 2013.

== Biography ==
Okobo was ordained a priest for the diocese of Enugu on 4 June 1966.

Pope John Paul II appointed him the first bishop of the diocese of Nsukka, which was established on the same date, on 19 November 1990. The Pope consecrated him bishop on 6 January of the following year in St. Peter's Basilica; His co-consecrators were Giovanni Battista Re, Substitute of the Secretariat of State, and Justin Francis Rigali, Secretary of the Congregation for Bishops.

On 13 April 2013, Pope Francis accepted his retirement due to age. Okobo died on 29 August 2025, at the age of 88. He was mourned by Godfrey Onah.

Catholic Church titles
Preceded by First	Bishop of Nsukka; 1990–2013	Succeeded by Godfrey Igwebuike Onah
