= Ernesto Aura =

Spanish voice actor (1940–2008)

- Born: Ernesto Aura León; 28 January 1940; Barcelona, Spain
- Died: 4 November 2008 (aged 68); Barcelona, Spain
- Occupations: Voice actor; announcer
- Years active: 1958–2008

Ernesto Aura León (28 January 1940 – 4 November 2008) was a Spanish voice actor and announcer. He was considered to be a veteran as an accomplished dubbing actor. He also made appearances in theater and on television.

== Professional career ==
=== Voice acting ===
Aura began his career as a radio actor and debuted in the world of dubbing in 1959 at the hands of Felipe Peña for the Barcelona studios, Voz de España (Voice of Spain). In 1970 he moved to Madrid where he also pursued a career as an actor on several television dramatic programs on RTVE. In the mid 70's he returned to Barcelona to focus on his career as a voice actor.

His powerful and very serious voice was ideal to dub many of the "tough guys" who came out on the big screen. His most popular voice acting role was that of Arnold Schwarzenegger. Ernesto dubbed several of Schwarzenegger's films for their release in Spain and his voice became easily associated with Schwarzenegger's personalities on the screen.

He was also the voice of internationally acclaimed actors such as Martin Sheen, Clint Eastwood, Christopher Plummer, James Coburn, Tommy Lee Jones and Laurence Fishburne. His first major role was dubbing Richard Widmark in Panic in the Streets. He dubbed Sheen's character, Roger Strong, in the 2002 film Catch Me If You Can, Christopher Plummer's character, Raymond Alden, in Wolf, Tommy Lee Jones' character, Harvey Dent in Batman Forever and Laurence Fishburne's character, Morpheus, in Matrix among many other roles.

=== Other work ===
In the area of television, Ernesto Aura appeared in many literary adaptations produced by Studio 1 on TVE, such as The Three Musketeers and Peribañez and the Commander of Ocana, among others.

=== Death ===
On 4 November 2008, Aura died of cancer in Barcelona at the age of 68. With his death, he left a legacy of being one of the greatest masters of interpretation and one of the best dubbing voices in Spain.

== Dubbing ==
Aura dubbed Schwarzenegger's roles in the following movies, among others:

- Around the World in 80 Days (2004)
- Welcome to the Jungle (2003)
- Collateral Damage (2002)
- The 6th Day (2000)
- End of Days (1999)
- Batman and Robin (1997)
- Jingle all the way (1996)
- Eraser (1996)
- Junior (1994)
- True Lies (1994)
- Kindergarten Cop (1990)
- Total Recall (1990)
- Red Heat (1988)
- The Running Man (1987)
- Conan the Destroyer (1984)
- The Jayne Mansfield Story (1980)
