= Jimmy Abson =

Canadian football player

Profile
- Positions: Defensive back, FW

Personal information
- Born: September 30, 1920; Ottawa, Ontario, Canada
- Died: November 21, 2008 (aged 88)

Career information
- Junior: Ottawa Gladstones

Career history
- 1945–1946: Ottawa Rough Riders

James Donald Abson (September 30, 1920 – November 21, 2008) was a Canadian professional football defensive back and flying wing. He played for the Ottawa Rough Riders from 1945 to 1946.
