= Edward Sheehan =

American journalist (c. 1930–2008)

- Born: c. 1930; Newton, Massachusetts, U.S.
- Died: November 3, 2008; Newton, Massachusetts
- Education: Boston College
- Occupations: Journalist, novelist
- Children: Soraya Sheehan
- Writing career
- Genre: Essay
- Subjects: Middle East, Africa
- Notable works: The Arabs, Israelis and Kissinger

Edward Richard Fulton Sheehan (c. 1930 – November 3, 2008) was an American author and foreign correspondent who reported from the Middle East, Africa and Central America as a freelance journalist in the pages of newspapers, magazines and the many books he authored.

== Life and family ==
Growing up in Newton, Massachusetts, Sheehan attended the local parish school where he was the regular altar boy for the parish pastor, Bishop Richard Cushing, who was later elevated to become Archbishop of Boston and cardinal. Sheehan remained a conservative Roman Catholic throughout his life.

He attended Boston College High School and moved on to Boston College, where he participated on the school's newspaper and graduated in 1952.

He served in the United States Navy after graduating from college. Sheehan was hired by The Boston Globe and was sent overseas to cover stories in Europe, the Middle East and North Africa. His work also includes Latin America; Agony in the Garden and Innocent Darkness, both very successful novels. Sheehan found his daughter in El Salvador. He started work for the United States Department of State in 1957, serving in the American embassies in Egypt in 1957 to 1958 and in Lebanon from 1959 to 1961.

== Works ==
These experiences were the seeds of his 1964 debut novel, Kingdom of Illusion, published by Random House, which tells the intrigues swirling around Mohammed VII, playboy king of the Middle Eastern country of Al Khadra. Most of Sheehan's reporting career was as a freelance journalist, whose articles appeared in a variety of publications, including Harper's Magazine, The New York Review of Books and The New York Times.

His contributions to The New York Times Magazine in the 1960s and 1970s this included stories about travels on the Congo River, the ascendancy of Milton Obote as President of Uganda, the Black September hijackings and detonation of U.S. aircraft, the accession of Anwar Sadat in Egypt and Libya's Muammar al-Gaddafi and its oil wealth.

Sheehan was known for coverage of the Arab–Israeli conflict. Using his well—placed sources, Sheehan was able to quote in a 1976 article of Foreign Policy conversations that took place in 1974 between Richard Nixon, Henry Kissinger and Mid-East leaders in which Nixon indicated his support for the return of all lands conquered by Israel in the 1967 Six-Day War. These excerpts were later expanded into his 1976 book The Arabs, Israelis and Kissinger. The State Department denied the claims and a hunt was made for the source of the leaks. Further details from these reliable Nixon Administration sources were included in The Arabs, Israelis and Kissinger about Kissinger's role as a shuttle diplomat trying to resolve the conflict between Syrian leader Hafez al-Assad, Egyptian President Anwar Sadat and Israel's Prime Minister Golda Meir. Alfred Atherton, a career foreign service officer, had taken detailed notes during the shuttle negotiations and was Sheehan's source. Atherton was given what Time magazine described as a "serious reprimand" for his actions, though Kissinger himself appears to have authorized Atherton to share the information with Sheehan.

His 1989 book Agony in the Garden documented his travels to the war zones and trouble spots in Central America, including his travels with the Contras in Nicaragua.

Sheehan died in Newton at age 78 on November 3, 2008, of an allergic reaction to medication.
