= John Odom (baseball) =

- Pitcher
- Born: January 6, 1982; Roswell, Georgia, U.S.
- Died: November 5, 2008 (aged 26); Roswell, Georgia, U.S.
- Batted: Right Threw: Right
- Stats at Baseball Reference

John C. Odom (January 6, 1982 – November 5, 2008) was an American minor league baseball right-handed pitcher notable for being traded for ten baseball bats while playing in the independent Golden Baseball League in May 2008. Before his stint in the Golden Baseball League, Odom played baseball at Tallahassee Community College and in the minor-league system of the San Francisco Giants.

Because of the trade, Odom was known to fans as "Bat Man", "Bat Guy" and "Bat Boy." Odom left baseball three weeks after the trade, and he died of an accidental drug overdose a few months later.

== Early life ==
Odom, 6-foot-2, described himself as a "lost youth." He was kicked off of his high school baseball team in Roswell, Georgia. He then played two seasons for the Tallahassee Community College baseball team, going 6-1 with a 2.75 ERA in 2004. In 2003, he was drafted in the 44th round by the San Francisco Giants.

== Career ==
Odom played for the Giants' affiliates Salem Keizer Volcanoes in 2004 and 2006, and the Augusta Greenjackets in 2005. He missed most of the 2005 season because of a right elbow injury, having Tommy John surgery in June 2005. He did not play in 2007 due to a dislocated left shoulder. In three seasons and 140.1 career innings in the Giants' farm system, Odom compiled a 3.98 ERA and averaged 7.35 strikeouts per nine innings. He was minor league teammates with Tim Lincecum and Kevin Frandsen.

=== The trade ===
The Giants released Odom during spring training 2008. He then signed in May with the Calgary Vipers of the Golden Baseball League, but a mark on his criminal record, a 1999 conviction for aggravated assault when he was a minor, prevented his entry into Canada. The Vipers offered Odom to the Laredo Broncos for a Bronco player, but that player refused to move to Calgary. The Broncos then offered $1000 cash for Odom, but the Vipers felt cash deals made the team appear financially unstable. The teams then came to an agreement on May 20 to exchange Odom for ten Prairie Sticks maple bats, worth a total of $665.

In Laredo, they called him "Bat man", and played the Batman Theme when he took the mound. After a bad outing on June 5 in Amarillo, Texas, the heckling from fans and even an umpire was more than he could handle. Although his following outing in San Angelo on June 10 went well, he decided to leave the team.

== Death ==
On November 5, 2008 Odom died of an accidental overdose from heroin, methamphetamine, benzylpiperazine and alcohol. It was election night, and Odom's family said that he had gone out partying that night. Dan Shwam, Odom's former Broncos manager, suggests the media and fan response to the trade "drove him back to the bottle, that it put him on the road to drugs again."

The ten bats that the Vipers received for Odom were never used, and the Vipers planned to auction them off for charity, but Ripley's Believe It or Not! purchased them for $10,000.
