= Flockton Grey =

British-bred Thoroughbred racehorse

- Sire: Dragonara Palace
- Grandsire: Young Emperor
- Dam: Misippus
- Damsire: Green God
- Sex: Gelding
- Foaled: 5 June 1980
- Country: United Kingdom
- Colour: Grey
- Owner: Ken Richardson
- Trainer: Stephen Wiles
- Record: unraced

Flockton Grey was the British racehorse at the centre of one of the largest betting scandals to hit British horseracing. The affair remains the best-known case of a corrupt trainer and owner using a ringer to race in place of another horse. Because of the use of the ringer, Flockton Grey did not actually run in the race for which he became most famous.

== Background ==
Flockton Grey was an undistinguished gelding, by Dragonara Palace out of Misippus, a mare who later produced the dual Cheltenham Festival winner Montelado. He was sold for 900 guineas as a foal and for 1,700 guineas as a yearling. On the latter occasion he was bought by Ken Richardson, who sent the gelding into training with Stephen Wiles in Yorkshire.

== Race ==
Flockton Grey was entered into his first race for two-year-olds on 29 March 1982 at Leicester Racecourse. As a debutant from an unsuccessful yard (Stephen Wiles had failed to train a winner in two years), the horse was priced at 10-1. The perpetrators of the scam, Richardson and Wiles, saw an opportunity to make a profit and backed their horse with £20,000, spreading their money around several different betting shops to avoid detection. They then arranged for a three-year-old horse, Good Hand, formerly owned by Richardson, to run in place of Flockton Grey. According to the official weight for age scale, a three-year-old at that time of year ought to have carried 47 pounds more than a two-year-old so that Good Hand, meeting his younger opponents at level weights, had a huge advantage. Good Hand was too strong for the competition and won by twenty lengths.

== Investigation ==
The margin of victory caused immediate suspicion, and bookmakers refused to pay out. A police investigation followed. Official race photographs revealed the winner had teeth too developed to be a two-year-old's. Records of the course veterinarian disclosed that the winner had a conspicuous scar on its foreleg. Investigators traced Flockton Grey to one of Wiles' yards, determining his identity by blood tests, but found no scar. The deceit uncovered, Richardson was charged with conspiracy to defraud. In June 1984, he was convicted, fined £20,000 with £25,000 in costs, and given a suspended nine-month prison sentence. Following his conviction, the Jockey Club "warned off" Richardson for an unprecedented period of 25 years. Wiles received a similar ban from racing. Jockey Kevin Darley was exonerated of any knowledge of the switch, and it was noted that a rider with inside knowledge could easily have held his horse back, minimising the winning margin and preventing any suspicion.

== Later developments ==
Richardson would later resurface as the chairman of Bridlington Town Football Club, and later the self-styled "benefactor" of Doncaster Rovers; Bridlington Town went bankrupt during his stewardship, with fans of the club accusing Richardson of gross financial mismanagement. Similar accusations were made during his tenure at Doncaster. The tumultuous period in the club's history only ended in 1999, when Richardson was convicted of attempted arson for his role in hiring three associates to burn down Doncaster's ground to collect insurance money. He was jailed for four years and ordered to pay £75,000 in costs.

During the investigations and trials which followed the scandal, Flockton Grey remained in police custody, and was only "released" in 1986: he never competed in a race. He lived to the age of 28, spending his last twenty years at the stable of Mary Dick near Worksop. On his death from a heart attack in 2008, Dick described him as "a gem, my favourite horse".
