= Godfrey Onah =

Nigerian Catholic prelate

The Most Reverend Godfrey Onah
- Bishop of Nsukka
- Church: Roman Catholic Church
- Diocese: Nsukka
- Appointed: 13 April 2013
- Installed: 4 July 2013
- Predecessor: Francis Okobo

Orders
- Ordination: 28 July 1984 by Michael Eneja
- Consecration: 4 July 2013 by John Onaiyekan

Personal details
- Born: Godfrey Igwebuike Onah; 18 August 1956 (age 69) Imilike Ani, Enugu State, Nigeria
- Motto: Volumus Iesum videre (lit. 'We want to see Jesus')
- Coat of arms

Godfrey Igwebuike Onah (born 18 August 1956) is a Nigerian Catholic prelate who has served as the Bishop of the Diocese of Nsukka since 4 July 2013. He was appointed by Pope Francis and took office after the resignation of Bishop Francis Okobo.

== Biography ==
Onah was born on 18 August 1956 in Imilike-Ani, Udenu, Enugu State, Nigeria. He enrolled into St. John Cross Seminary, Nsukka on 14 January 1971, where he graduated in 1975 and had his junior apostolic work there. He studied philosophy at St. Joseph's Major Seminary, Ikot Ekpene from 1976 to 1980, and his theological studies at Bigard Memorial Seminary, Enugu until 1983. While a student, he served as the Editor-in-Chief of The Fountain Magazine and The Torch Magazine from 1982 to 1983. He was ordained to the Catholic priesthood on 28 July 1984 by Bishop Michael Eneja at the Holy Ghost Cathedral, Enugu.

From 1984 to 1987, Onah served as the Vicar of St. Mary parish in Opanda Nimbo, Enugu. From 1987 to 1988, he taught at the Seat of Wisdom Seminary, Owerri. From 1988 to 1992, he had his further philosophical studies and obtained his Licentiate and doctorate in philosophy from the Pontifical Urban University, Rome. He became a professor of philosophy in 1992. From 1993 to 1994, he was an assistant pastor of St. Pius X parish, Rome. From 1994 to 1997, he was the diocesan administrator of St. Anthony of Padua parish of the Diocese of Albano, Rome and from 1997 to 2000, the Center for the Missionary Apostolate, Diocese of Albano. From 2000 to 2005, he was the Chaplain of the Ecclesial Movement of Cultural Engagement (MEIC) in the Diocese of Albano. From 2001 to 2007, he was the director of the Institute for Research on Non-Faith and Culture at the Pontifical Urban University. From 2003 to 2009, he became the Prefect of Studies of the Pontifical Urban College, Rome. He has served as the peritus in the 11th Ordinary General Assembly of the Synod of Bishops on the Eucharist in 2003, 12th Ordinary General Assembly of the Synod of Bishops on the Word of God in 2004. Since 2008, he has been Vice Rector of the Pontifical Urban University, Rome until his appointment as a bishop by Pope Francis.

== Episcopacy ==
Onah was installed as bishop of Nsukka diocese on 4 July 2013. He took the motto, Volumus iesum videre lit. 'We want to see Jesus', the request made by some Greeks to Philip in John 12:21.

== Public speaking ==
On 25 July 2025, Onah spoke on "Moral Integrity: Fortress Of A Healthy Nation" in the annual lecture of the Catholic Brothers United at St. Agnes Catholic Church in Maryland, US. On 26 September 2025, he delivered the Ahiajoku annual lecture at Ahiajoku Convention Centre in Owerri, Imo State on the title "The Future of Igbo Economy Amidst the Challenges of Insecurity in the Southeast: A Call for Paradigm Shift".

== Views ==
Onah has advocated that priest give the congregation chance to carry out the Sacrament of Penance. On 4 July 2024 during the homily for his 11th episcopal anniversary, he told priests that, "not availing the Sacrament of Penance to the people of God regularly can cause them to lose the 'sense of guilt'...If you allow the people to lose the sense of guilt, it will not be long before they lose the sense of the sacred, because it is standing before the sacred that you feel your worthiness and the need to ask for forgiveness".

== Personal life ==
Onah is fluent in Igbo, English, French, Spanish, Italian and German languages. He was the first bishop to be appointed during the pontificate of Pope Francis.
