= Bette Garber =

American photojournalist (1942–2008)

Bette S. Garber
- Born: November 18, 1942; Chicago, Illinois
- Died: November 13, 2008 (aged 65); Philadelphia, Pennsylvania
- Occupation: Photojournalist

Bette S. Garber (November 18, 1942 – November 13, 2008) was an American photojournalist known for her fashion photographs and pictures of customized semi-trucks. She worked for Heavy Duty Trucking Magazine and published several books.

== Formative years ==
Garber was born in Chicago on November 18, 1942. She attended the University of Illinois and earned a bachelor's degree of English in 1964. After college, she worked as a copywriter and married Charles Garber.

== Career ==
In 1970, Garber and her husband founded Structure Probe, an electron microscopy company. Working for their company, she was often on the road. During the mid-1970s, she purchased a CB radio to enable her to obtain traffic reports. The CB radio also picked up trucker communications and conversations and it was this that first sparked her interest in the world of big trucks. She began taking pictures of the trucks she encountered, and then also started writing stories about the trucks and their drivers, which she submitted to trucking magazines. Eventually, she left Structure Probe, and for the next thirty years, devoted herself full-time to her passion for trucking photojournalism.

== Death ==
Garber died in Philadelphia from pneumonia at the age of sixty-five on November 13, 2008.

== Publications ==
- Custom Semi Trucks. MBI Publishing Company, 2003. (ISBN 0760314594)
- Big Rigs. MBI Publishing Company, 2004. (ISBN 0760319960)
- Custom Semi. MBI Publishing Company, 2005. (ISBN 0760321337)
- Ultra-Custom Semi Trucks. MBI Publishing Company, 2008. (ISBN 0760332924)
