= Rex Neame =

English cricketer

Personal information
- Full name: Arthur Rex Beale Neame
- Born: 14 June 1936; Faversham, Kent
- Died: 12 November 2008 (aged 72); Herne Bay, Kent
- Batting: Right-handed
- Bowling: Right-arm off-break

Domestic team information
- Years: Team
- 1956–1957: Kent
- FC debut: 14 July 1956 Kent v Northants
- Last FC: 9 July 1958 DR Jardine's XI v Cambridge University

Career statistics
Competition	First-class
Matches	10
Runs scored	234
Batting average	13.00
100s/50s	0/1
Top score	69
Balls bowled	336
Wickets	4
Bowling average	42.50
5 wickets in innings	0
10 wickets in match	0
Best bowling	2/4
Catches/stumpings	8/–
- Source: Cricinfo, 5 April 2014

Arthur Rex Beale Neame (14 June 1936 – 12 November 2008), known as Rex Neame, was an English amateur cricketer who worked in the brewing industry. He played first-class cricket for Kent County Cricket Club between 1956 and 1957 as well as for other teams, including MCC and Free Foresters and was one of the leading schoolboy sportsmen of the mid-1950s.

== Early life ==
Neame was born at Faversham in Kent into the Neame family which operated the Shepherd Neame brewery in the town. He was educated at prep school at Hindhead in Hampshire before going on to Harrow School where he captained the cricket team in 1954 and 1955 and was Head Boy in his final year. He captained England at schoolboy level in both cricket and rugby union and was considered a talented sportsman and described as the "leading all-rounder" in school cricket in 1955.

== Cricket career ==
Neame made his Kent debut in 1956 and played occasionally for the team as an amateur when he could find the time to be away from the family business. He made a total of 10 first-class appearances, including four for Kent. He played more regularly for the county Second XI and won his Second XI cap in 1956.

== Work life ==
In 1959 Neame took over the day-to-day management of Shepherd Neame's Queen Court Farm at Ospringe and in 1961 was appointed to the brewery's board. He left the company in 1967 after his contract was not renewed and worked at Bulmers and Marston's breweries before running a hotel near Kinlochbervie in Sutherland.

== Later life ==
After moving to Norfolk to paint, Neame returned to live in Kent after becoming unwell. He suffered from Alzheimer's disease and died at a nursing home at Herne Bay in 2008 aged 72.
