= Diocese of Nsukka =

Roman Catholic diocese in Nigeria

Diocese of Nsukka Dioecesis Nsukkana

Location
- Country: Nigeria
- Territory: a portion of Enugu State
- Ecclesiastical province: Onitsha
- Metropolitan: Onitsha
- Coordinates: 6°51′24″N 7°23′45″E

Statistics
- Area: 3,180 km^{2} (1,230 sq mi)
- Population: Total; Catholics: (as of 2022); 1,593,655; 1,103,961 (69.3%)
- Parishes: 220

Information
- Denomination: Catholic Church
- Sui iuris church: Latin Church
- Rite: Roman Rite
- Established: 19 November 1990
- Cathedral: Saint Theresa Cathedral, Nsukka
- Secular priests: 345

Current leadership
- Pope: Leo XIV
- Bishop: Godfrey Igwebuike Onah
- Vicar General: Very Rev. Fr. Cajetan Iyidobi

Map
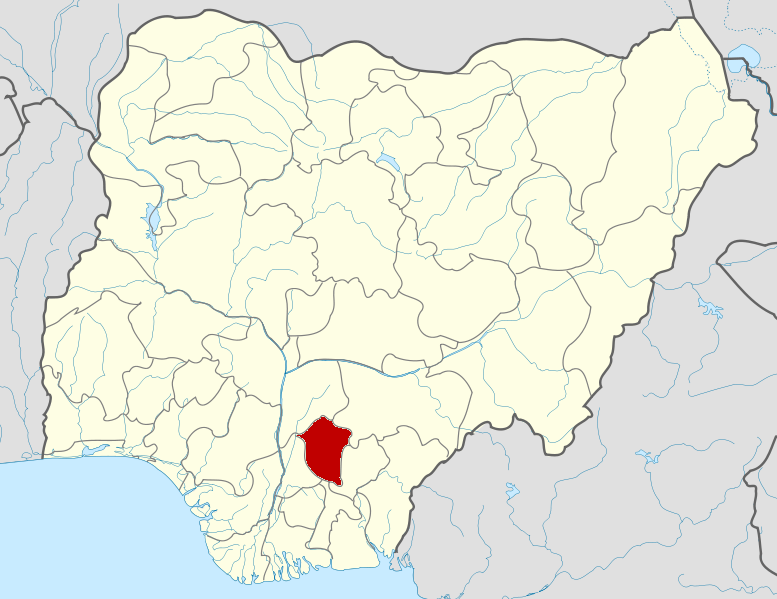
- Nsukka is located in Enugu State which is shown here in red.

Website
- http://nsukkacatholicdiocese.org

The Diocese of Nsukka (Latin: Nsukkan(a)) is a Latin Church ecclesiastical territory or diocese of the Catholic Church located in the city of Nsukka, Nigeria. The Diocese of Nsukka is a suffragan diocese in the ecclesiastical province of the metropolitan Archdiocese of Onitsha.

The Diocese of Nsukka has partnered with the Archdiocese of Chicago's Office of Catholic Schools in Chicago, Illinois, in the United States, in order to provide further training and formation and improved organization to the Diocese of Nsukka's schools staff.

== Special churches ==
The Cathedral is Saint Theresa Cathedral in Nsukka.

== Leadership ==
- Bishops of Nsukka (Roman Rite)
  - Bishop Francis Emmanuel Ogbonna Okobo (1990–2013)
  - Bishop Godfrey Igwebuike Onah (since 4 July 2013)

== See also ==
- Catholic Church in Nigeria
