= Teresa Amuli =

Mozambican politician (died 2008)

Member of the People's Assembly
- In office 1977–
- Constituency: Niassa Province

Personal details
- Died: 20 November 2008; Maputo, Mozambique

Teresa Amuli Nhalingue (died 20 November 2008) was a Mozambican politician. In 1977 she was one of the first group of women elected to the People's Assembly.

== Biography ==
Originally from Niassa Province, Amuli joined the FRELIMO movement in 1965 at the age of 18. She was a FRELIMO candidate in the 1977 parliamentary elections, in which she was one of the first group of 27 women elected to the People's Assembly. She was re-elected to the Assembly in 1986 from Niassa Province.

She died of a brain tumor at Maputo Central Hospital in November 2008. A secondary school in Espungabera was named for her.
