= Michael Eneja =

Nigerian Catholic prelate (1919–2008)

- Emeritus Bishop of Enugu
- Church: Roman Catholic Church
- See: Enugu
- In office: 1977–1996
- Predecessor: Godfrey Okoye
- Successor: Anthony Gbuji

Orders
- Ordination: 29 July 1951

Personal details
- Born: Michael Ugwuja Eneja; January 1919 Ibagwa Nkwo, Nigeria
- Died: 14 November 2008 (aged 89)

Michael Ugwuja Eneja (January 1919 – 14 November 2008) was a Nigerian Catholic prelate who served as the bishop of the Diocese of Enugu on 10 November 1977 to 8 November 1996.

== Biography ==
Eneja was born in Ibagwa Ani, Enugu State, Nigeria. He was ordained a priest on 29 July 1951 for the Archdiocese of Onitsha before he was incardinated to the then newly created Diocese of Enugu, where he was appointed bishop on 10 November 1977 by Pope John Paul II. Eneja received his episcopal consecration on 28 February 1978 and remained bishop until his retirement on 8 November 1996. He died on 14 November 2008.
