= Eugene Andolsek =

American artistic draughtsman (1921–2008)

Eugene Andolsek (1921 – November 17, 2008) was an American artistic draughtsman. His works are considered outsider art.

== Life ==
Eugene Andolsek was born in Adrian, West Virginia, United States. He grew up with his mother's homemade quilts and crochet pieces which became a principal influence for his later drawings. In 1953, Andolsek became a stenographer for the Rock Island Railroad.

== Work ==
In 1950, Andolsek began producing drawings based on grids. He spent almost every evening for the next fifty years drawing intricately patterned pieces, using basic drawing instruments and graph paper, as a means of diverting his thoughts from worrying about work. He was soon creating abstract compositions of remarkable geometric and chromatic complexity and produced several thousand kaleidoscopic designs. His creative work ended in 2003 as a result of deteriorated eyesight.

== Mental health ==
After being made redundant, Andolsek developed an irreversible eye disorder and became almost blind, provoking him to consider suicide. His cousin intervened, moving him to a home and rescuing Andolsek's drawings.

== Recognition ==
As a result of the move Andolsek's drawings were shown to an administrator at Pittsburgh's Andy Warhol Museum, who in turn showed them to Brooke Davis Anderson of the American Folk Art Museum. Anderson included some of the work in a group show at AFAM called "Obsessive Drawing" in 2005. Andolsek's first solo show was in March 2006 at American Primitive Gallery. He had another exhibition there in 2008, before he died of pneumonia and sepsis on November 17 of that year.
