= Badaró =

Brazilian-Portuguese actor and comedian

Manlio Hedair Badaró (April 23, 1933 – November 1, 2008) was a Brazilian-Portuguese actor and comedian.

== Biography ==
Born in Brazil, Badaró moved to Portugal in 1957. He came over as part of the comedy group "Brasileira Fogo no Pandeiro." Once he restarted his career in Portugal he started to appear in several plays including "Empresta-me o teu apartamento" with actress Alina Vaz.

During an interview in May 2008 Badaró said "I have so many health problems that they have lost count: suffered a heart attack, a stroke, had a lymphoma and now I have discovered another cancer". Badaró died of stomach cancer on November 1, 2008.

== Filmography ==
Year	Title	Role	Notes
1952	Simão o Caolho		
1955	Colégio de Brotos	Polípio	
1957	A Baronesa Transviada	Neco	
1959	Meus Amores no Rio		
1962	O Milionário		
2002	Aparelho Voador a Baixa Altitude	Enrico	(final film role)
