= Pune Police =

Police force in Pune, India

Pune City Police Department पुणे शहर पोलीस
- Abbreviation: PCP
- Motto: Safety, Security & Satisfaction (SSS)

Agency overview
- Formed: 1764
- Employees: 9,000 (approx.)

Jurisdictional structure
- Operations jurisdiction: PUNE, IN
- Area: 790 km^{2} (310 sq mi)
- Population: 7,358,008
- Legal jurisdiction: Pune

Operational structure
- Headquarters: 2, Sadhu Vaswani Road, Camp
- Elected officer responsible: Devendra Fadnavis, Home Minister of Maharastra
- Agency executive: Amitesh Kumar, IPS, Commissioner of Police
- Parent agency: Maharashtra Police

Facilities
- Stations: 30
- Lockups: 6

Website
- Official website
- Emergency helpline - 100 or 112

Pune City Police Department (PCPD) is the law enforcement agency with jurisdiction over 790 km^{2} in the city of Pune, India. The city police is division of Maharashtra Police, i.e. state police department of Maharashtra. The current Pune Commissionerate or Headquarters came into existence on 1 July 1965. Pune City Police Department operates from 30 police stations. It also has the responsibility of traffic policing the city roads.

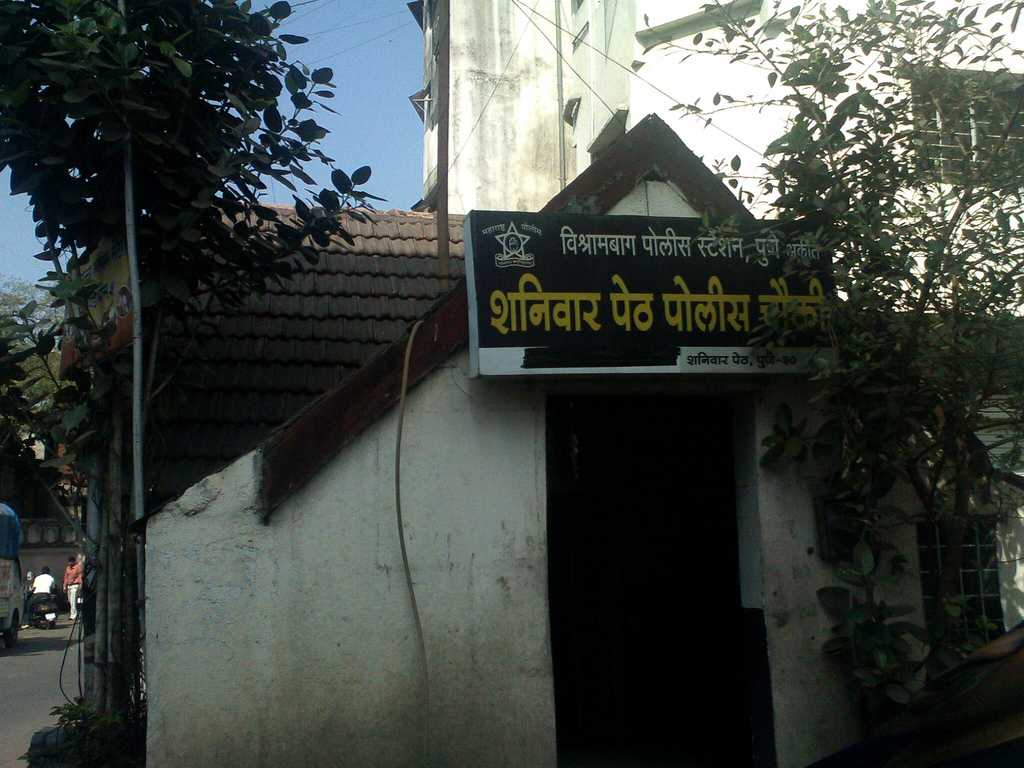
Shaniwar Peth Police Chowky : One of the earliest Police Chowky in Pune

== History ==
Though policing existed in ancient and medieval period also but it was known by different names. In 1764, the Peshwa Madhav Rao I created for the first time a regular office of Kotwal or the Head of Police, and appointed Balaji Narayan Ketkar, the first Kotwal (City Police Superintendent) of Pune. The city was divided into 4 police stations, known as Kotwal Chawdi, viz. Somwar Peth, Vetal Peth, Raviwar Peth, and Budhwar Peth. The next Kotwal Ghasiram added Narayan Peth and Shaniwar Peth.

The British created the police department as we know it today. After conquering Sindh, as Governor of Bombay Presidency, Sir Charles Napier introduced a new force in 1843 exclusively for police work and having no links with the military. Later on, the British government passed the Police Act, 1861, to re-organize the police department.

In 1882 the strength of the district or regular police was 1096. Of these under the District Superintendent two were subordinate officers, 177 were inferior subordinate officers, and twenty-five were mounted and 891 foot constables. The cost of maintaining this force was for the Superintendent a yearly salary of £920 (Rs. 9200); for the subordinate officers yearly salaries of not less than £120 (Rs. 1200) and the inferior subordinate officers on yearly salaries of less than £120 (Rs. 1200), a yearly cost of £4686 (Rs. 46,860); and for the foot and mounted constables a cost of £10,171 (Rs. 1,01,710). Besides their pay a sum of £240 (Rs. 2400) was yearly allowed for the horse and travelling allowances of the Superintendent; £696 (Rs. 6960) for the pay and travelling allowances of his establishment.; £223 (Rs. 2230) for the horse and travelling allowances of subordinate officers; and £2025 (Rs. 20,250) a year for contingencies and petty charges. Thus the total yearly cost of maintaining the police department amounted to £18,962 (Rs. 1,89,620).

On an area of 5348 square miles, and a population of 900,621, these figures give one constable for every 4.88 square miles and 821 people and a cost of £3 10s. 11d. (Rs. 35 as. 71/3) to the square mile or 5½d. (32/3 as.) to each head of the population. Of the total strength of 1096, exclusive of the Superintendent, ninety-one, twelve officers and seventy-nine men, were in 1882 employed as guards over treasuries and lockups or as escorts to prisoners and treasure, 239 were posted in towns and municipalities, 153 in cantonments, and 612,103 officers and 509 men, on other duties. Of the whole number, exclusive of the Superintendent, 509 were provided with fire-arms and 586 were provided with batons, and 219 of whom eighty-seven were officers and 132 men could read and write.

Except for the District Superintendent who was a European and ten officers and three men who were Eurasians, the members of the police department were all natives of India. Of these fifty-one officers and 198 men were Muhammadans, fourteen officers, and thirty men Brahmans, thirteen officers and sixty-six men Rajputs, eighty-two officers and 551 men Marathas, two officers and forty-eight men Ramoshis, six officers and twenty men Hindus of other castes, and one officer was a Jew. The European Superintendent and the ten Eurasian officers and three men were Christians.

== Organization ==
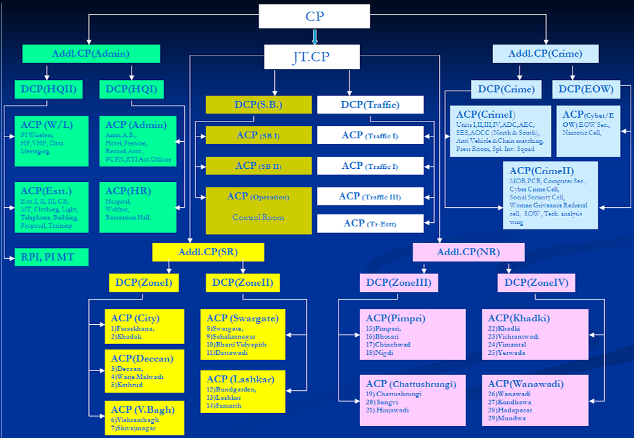
Organization structure of Pune City Police

The Pune City Police Department is headed by a Police Commissioner, who is an IPS officer. The position is currently held by Mr Amitesh Kumar, IPS of the 1995 batch. The Pune City Police comes under the state Home Ministry/Department. Currently Pune City Police comprises Commissioner of Police (1), Joint Commissioner of Police (1), Additional Commissioner of Police (4), Deputy Commissioner of Police (10), Assistant Commissioner of Police (23), Police Inspectors (135), Assistant Police Inspectors/Police Sub Inspector (570) and Police Men (8037). The Police Commissionerate is divided into two regions, North Region and South Region. Each region is headed by an Additional Commissioner of Police. Each region is divided into two zones, hence there are four Zones in Pune City viz. Zone-1, Zone-2, Zone-3, Zone-4. Each Zone is headed by a Deputy Commissioner of Police (DCP). Each Zone is further divided into two or three sub-divisions. Each sub-division is headed by an Assistant Commissioner of Police (ACP). There are 9 sub-divisions in Pune Police Commissionerate. Under each sub-division, there are 3–4 Police Stations. In Pune Police Commissionerate, including Pimpri-Chinchwad Corporation, defence cantonment board(2), there are 31 Police Stations, each headed by a Senior Police Inspector. There are 3–4 Police Chowkies for each Police Station. In Pune Police Commissionerate there are 104 Police Chowkies. Each Police Chowky is headed by an API/PSI ranked Officer.

Additionally it also has the following departments –

- Additional commissioner (Administration) assisted by DCP HQ – 1 and DCP HQ −2
- Additional commissioner (Law and Order, South Pune) assisted by DCP Zone – 1 and DCP Zone – 2
- Additional commissioner (Law and Order, North Pune) assisted by DCP Zone – 3 and DCP Zone – 4

== Branches of city police ==
=== Crime Branch ===
Pune city Crime Branch is the department meant for prevention and detection of crime, specialised ones in particular, committed in the city. It is headed by Additional commissioner (Crime) and is assisted by DCP Crime and DCP economic offence wing (EOW) and Cyber crime. Crime Branch is responsible for co-ordinating with other State Police/central agencies of India in serious and sensational crimes. It collects criminal intelligence for crime mapping. Crime Branch is divided into four units covering all the four zones under commissionerate. It has the following specialised units.

==== Economic Offences Wing (EOW) ====
EOW investigates complicated white collar crime viz; general, cheating, frauds in banking and medical fields, job racketing, shares and bogus stamp cases. This department is utilising the services of experts in Law, Accounting, Computer etc., during the course of investigation. EOW is headed by a DCP and assisted by one ACP (EOW and Cyber crime). There are four Police Inspectors in EOW.

==== Anti-Narcotic Cell (ANC) ====
ANC keeps check on drug peddling in the city. This cell initiates action against persons who deal in illegal sale and possession of Heroin, Hashish, M.Tabs, Methoquoline, Opium, Ganja, Cocaine, Consumption, Charas, Acetic acid, LSD STR/ ECA, Bhang, Morphine, Prezapam Chemicals, Buprenorphine (Inj.) under NDPS Act. It maintains surveillance at vulnerable places like Bars and Restaurants, Pubs, Hukka centres and places of dwelling by foreign nationals. The cell has helped contain the menace to a large extent. A Police Inspector is in-charge of this cell.

==== Modus Operandi Bureau (MOB) ====
MOB keeps a records of arrested and convicted accused. The records are classified on the basis of modus – operandi (mode of operations, the particular way of committing a crime) of criminals. The MOB has computerised the records of over 7,000 criminals in the city. The bureau has upgraded the records of criminals, including photographs, present address, telephone and mobile numbers, details of present activities, number of cases registered against the offender and details of other accomplices if the criminal heads a gang.

=== Special Branch (SB) ===
This is headed by a DCP and deals with student related crimes, politicians, banned organisation and immigrants. It also operates the Foreigners Registrations Office (FRO). DCP (SB) is assisted by two ACPs. The Special Branch is responsible for intelligence gathering, foreigners' registration and providing security to VIPs. SB performs special intelligence functions and has political, labour, student, communal, administrative and miscellaneous wings.

=== Traffic Branch ===
Deals with road and traffic safety. Traffic regulations, prevention and reduction in the number of accidents as well as inculcating a sense of discipline amongst road users are high on the agenda of Pune Traffic Police.

=== Police stations ===
There are 30 police stations under the Pune City Police Commissionerate. Each police station is headed by a senior police inspector rank officer. Crime related incidents are recorded at the chowky and registered by police station. Crime can be registered at chowky or at police station. The police station area is divided into 3 to 4 police chowkies /beats.

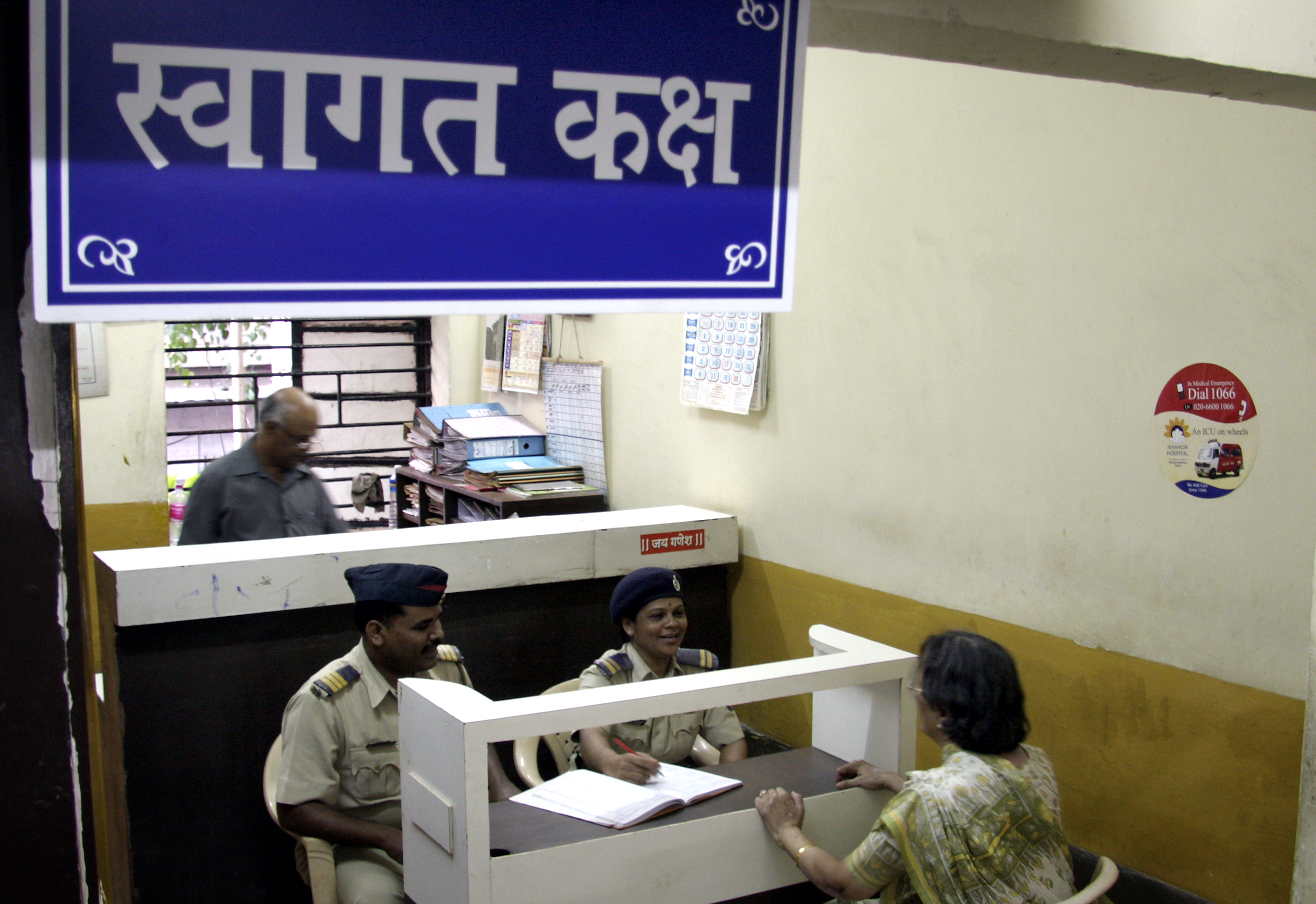
Reception Room at a police station in Pune

=== Police chowkies ===
There are 127 police chowkies under Pune city police. It is formed for the smooth working to avoid public inconvenience. Record of all important offices, different organisations, hotels, gunda elements, history-sheeters is maintained at the chowky. Every police chowky has API/PSI in charge and there are two police head constables and four police staff for the smooth functioning of the chowky. The chowky officer and staff maintains the law and order in the chowky jurisdiction. The vigilance is kept on the criminals who are on record by chowky officer and staff. The staff is able to reach the crime/incidents spot in short time and help the people. Watch is kept on any untoward incident by the chowky and same is informed to the superiors. Different committees are formed at the chowky level e.g. senior citizen committee, peace committee, and co-ordination is kept amongst them by way of periodical meetings.

=== Beat Marshall ===
Beat Marshalls patrol in the jurisdiction of police station. They are equipped with motor cycle, walkie talkie, carbine and rounds. Often visit the banks, malls, societies and sensitive places. Inform the control room & the police station of a sudden incident and to control the situation.

=== Mobile patrolling ===
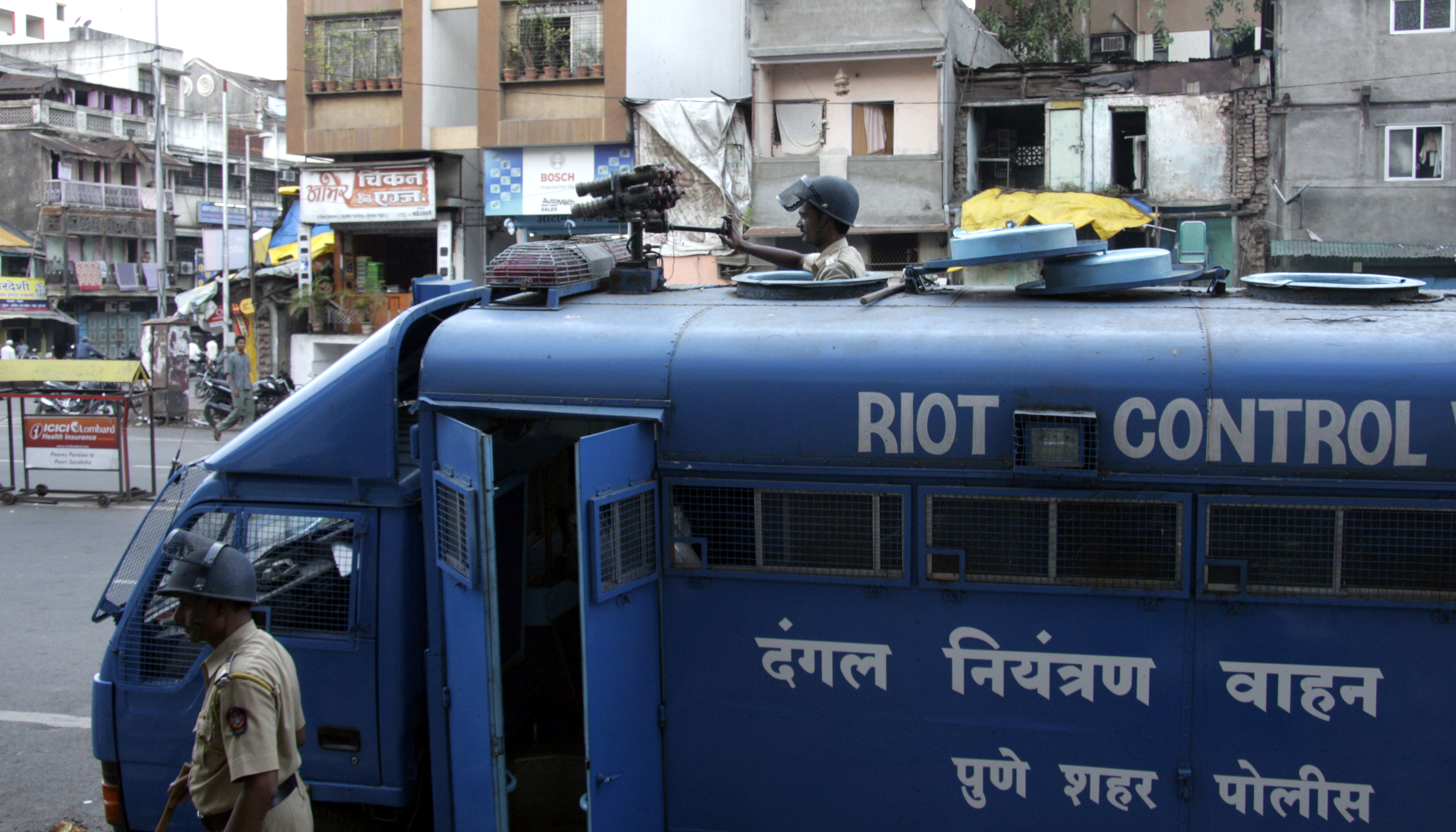
Riot control vehicle of Pune City Police

It is controlled by the control room. Every police station has 3 four-wheelers and 3 to 4 motorcycles patrolling in the concerned jurisdiction. Their duty is to patrol in the area for crime prevention, to attend to crime and calls of control room and to maintain law and order etc.

=== Control room ===
The Pune Police control room has a system for public assistance called 'Dial 100'. The control room has ten work stations each equipped with computers using special software that displays the cell/telephone number, name and addresses of a caller and records the call. The constable sitting on a particular station hears the complainant and prepares a challan of the complaint and sends it to wireless operator who in turn calls the nearest patrolling vehicle or marshal and gives them the details of the assistance required. The response time for police personal is normally 5 minutes.

The control room also monitors the regular calls from all police stations and patrolling mobiles. It channelised the communication of all police mobiles and static stations. The control room plays an important role to monitor the situation and also provide backup and regroup manpower and resources. It also maintains communication between ground staff and senior officers. The control room is headed by an officer of the rank of ACP who works under the control of the Deputy Commissioner of Police (DCP), Special Branch.

== Internship ==
For the first time, Police Commissioner Meera Borwankar initiated internship program (Pune Police Vidyarthi Abhiyan) for students with the city police. The objective of this unique internship program is to reduce the negative impression of Pune police from the layman's mind and to bring police and public closer. The students are assigned to a police station for eight days.

The curriculum includes information on different kinds of terminologies used in police stations like FIR, bailable and non-bailable offences etc., role of citizens in policing, rights of the accused, verification for passport, chowky system, importance of patrolling, different departments of the police, organisational structure of the city police and so on.

Each student is issued a certificate under the signature of zonal DCP after completion of the internship.

=== Objects of the project ===
- To inculcate the spirit of collaboration between students especially young citizens and police.
- To bridge the communication gap between students, citizens and police.
- To increase the basic legal knowledge of students.
- To apprise the policemen about the aspirations and expectations of the youth/students.
- To accept new ideas from young students especially regarding human resource development and management.

=== Methodology ===
- Each participating college nominates a nodal lecturer to co-ordinate the program/ 'abhiyan'.
- Each participating police station nominates a nodal officer for smooth functioning of the 'abhiyan'.
- The co-coordinators meet before launching the 'abhiyan' and decide the timetable and the content.
- Reading material has been designed and is administered to the students who shall be encouraged to ask questions/queries.
- The 'abhiyan' ends with a debriefing by the students and police officers where an officer of the rank ACP or above is present.
- Zonal DCPs personally monitor the 'abhiyan'. Additional CPs shall provide over-all guidance.

=== Expectations from students ===
- The students to study the police working at police station and 'Chowky' level
- To have basic understanding of different ranks of police/its hierarchy and how these officers work.
- Observe various field duties with policemen e.g. beat rounds
- To observers citizens' interaction with policemen.
- To understand the reading material provided about basic legal processes

=== Expectations from police officers and constables ===
- Police officers and constables share required information with students.
- They shall guide students about police working and inform them of the organisation and its hierarchy.
- They shall give basic knowledge about law that a young citizen needs.
- Officers and constables encourage the students to interact with them and ask questions/ queries.

== Quick Response Team (QRT) ==
Pune police have formed a 100-member strong Quick Response Team (QRT) to deal with any kind of terror strike in the city. The QRT operates under the aegis of Special Branch of the Pune City Police. The QRT is headed by a police inspector and divided into 13 teams. Every three months, jawans undergo a physical proficiency test (PPT) and constables below the age of 30 are selected for 5 years. They are trained to handle modern weapons such as Glock pistols, MP5 and AK-47 rifles at high and low frequency firing. The teams are equipped with bullet-proof vehicles, including six Scorpios, four light vans and adequate number of bullet-proof jackets.

The QRT has received training from the elite National Security Guard and Force One.

== Pune Police Public School ==
Pune Police Public School (PPPS), started in the year 2003, is an English medium school under the management of Symbiosis and Pune Citizens' Police Foundation (PCPF). The school is affiliated to the Maharashtra State Board and imparts education from Nursery to Std X. 50% seats are reserved for children of policemen and 50% for the Open students.

The school provides quality education to policemen's children at affordable fees. A project of the Pune Citizens Police Foundation, PPPS is the first project of its kind in India and now this project has been replicated in places including Nasik, Thane and Nagpur. Total strength in the academic year 2011–12 is 1142. The school is opposite Rahul Theatre in Shivajinagar.

PPPS was the brain child of then Police Commissioner of Pune, Shri A. N. Roy in 2003. He wanted an English medium school for the police personnel's children at affordable rates, thus came up the KG section of the PPPS. In 2005, primary and secondary classes were added besides the Mini KG.(Nursery).

== Trafficop ==
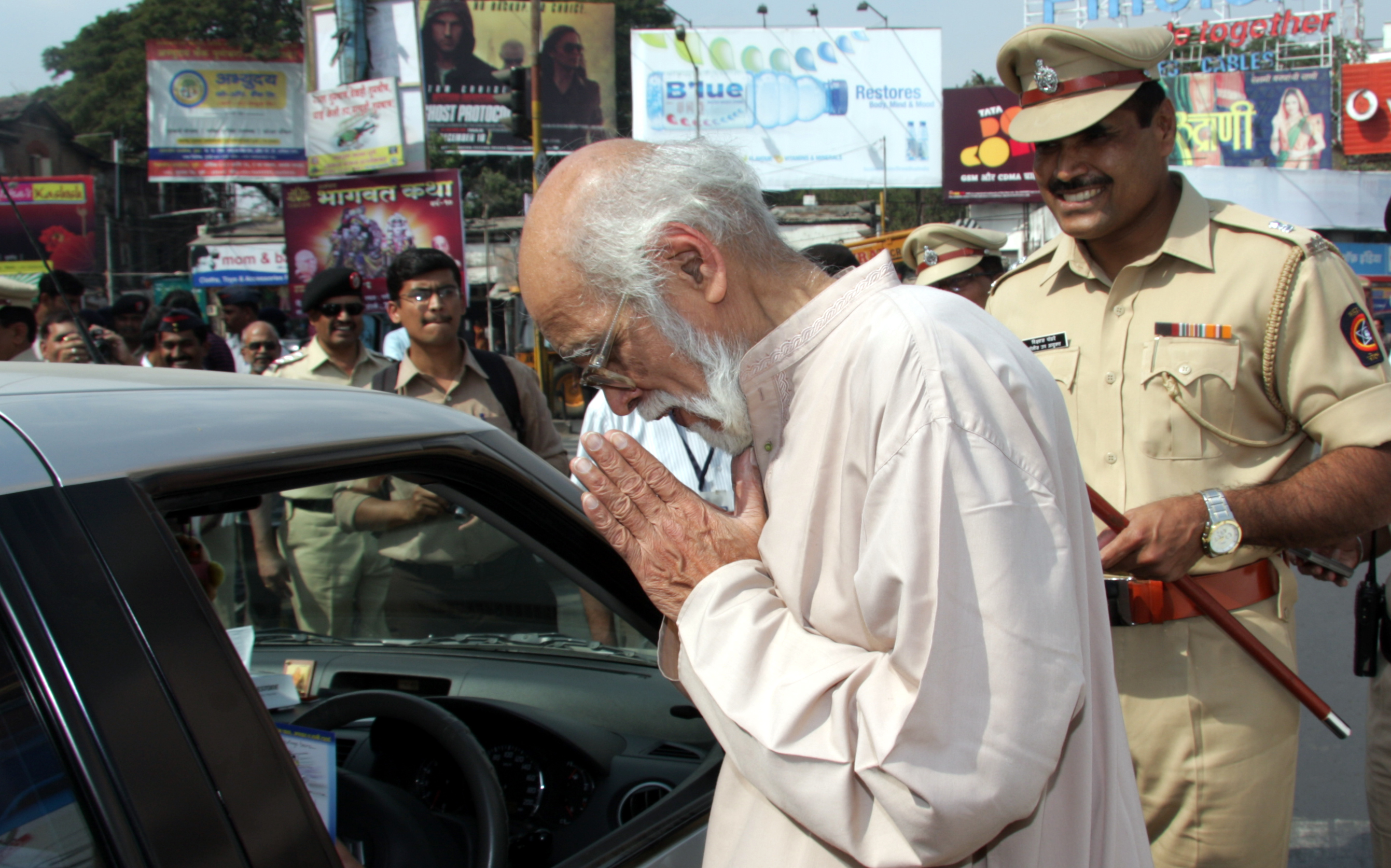
Noted Cartoonist Mangesh Tendulkar and DCP (Traffic) Vishwas Pandhare during traffic awareness campaign in Pune

To maintain traffic discipline, the Pune police have launched Trafficop – an m-development project that enables on-the-spot recording of traffic violations and maintaining of past offences committed by commuters.

Trafficop is a software application installed on a Blackberry mobile device that stores individual vehicle and license data. Traffic officers can enter the vehicle and license details of the offenders on the device and in real time, see the offender's history to issue a penalty accordingly. Each offence acts as a red mark on a report card creating a sense of fear and respect for traffic law amongst citizens. For authorities, readily available data helps them to carry out their duties efficiently. The initiative thus far has succeeded in registering 836,000 offences, suspending 2400 licences, identifying 950 regular offenders, and tracing 200 stolen vehicles.

Higher authorities can monitor the system through a web interface where they can use the data regarding number, type and location of offences to determine traffic patterns and future plans of action.

Trafficop has won many awards since its launch in November 2009.
