= Maharashtra Intelligence Academy =

- महाराष्ट्र गुप्तवार्ता प्रबोधिनी
- Active: October 2009 - Present
- Country: India
- Agency: State Intelligence Department, Maharashtra Police
- Type: law enforcement training facility
- Part of: Training Division
- Location: Pune

Notables
- Awards: Best Training Institute

The Maharashtra Intelligence Academy is the Maharashtra Police's law enforcement training and research center near Pune. Operated by the bureau's Training Division, it was first opened for use in October 2009.

== History ==
The Maharashtra Intelligence Academy (MIA) was established in October 2009 in response to the need for specialized training in intelligence and security following the 26/11 Mumbai terror attacks. The academy is located in Hadapsar, Pune, and operates under the Training Division of the Maharashtra Police's State Intelligence Department (SID). Initially, the MIA was formed by merging the Special Protection Training Centre in Pune and the Special Branch Training Centre of Mumbai.

In June 2021, the Maharashtra Intelligence Academy received the ISO:9001:2015 certification for its high training standards and adherence to quality management systems.

The academy also offers language training in Urdu, Bengali, Telugu, Madia Gondi, Gurmukhi, and Kashmiri to enhance the communication skills of security personnel working in diverse regions. Prominent figures such as Lt General Shekatkar and officials from the Special Protection Group (SPG), National Security Guard (NSG), Intelligence Bureau (IB), and Indo-Tibetan Border Police (ITBP) have contributed to the training programs at the MIA.

== Awards and acknowledgements ==
- Best Police Training Institute. (given by Government of India)
- ISO:9001:2015 Academy.
