= Rashmi Shukla =

Director General of Maharashtra Police

Rashmi Shukla IPS (Retd.)
- Born: 30 June 1964 (age 62)
- Police career
- Department: Maharashtra Police
- Rank: Director General of Police

Rashmi Shukla (born 30 June 1964) is a retired Indian Police Service (IPS) officer of the 1988 batch who has served as the Director General of Police DGP Maharashtra from January 2024 till January 2026. She was the first woman to hold this post. Prior, to this she served as Director General of Sashastra Seema Bal of India.

== Career ==
Her career reflects a series of high-profile appointments and extensive experience in law enforcement and security. She served as the Director General of the Sashastra Seema Bal (SSB) from March 2023, a Central Armed Police Force focused on guarding India’s borders with neighboring nations. Previously, she held the position of Additional Director-General of the Central Reserve Police Force (CRPF) in 2021, showcasing her expertise in leading national-level security operations. Over her career, she was awarded the President's Police Medal for Meritorious Service in 2005. Shukla also held a state-level roles, including Commissioner of Police in Pune and head of the State Intelligence Department (SID), demonstrating her longstanding involvement in both state and central law enforcement initiatives.
