= Death of Somnath Suryawanshi =

2024 death in Maharashtra, India

Somnath Vyankat Suryawanshi, a 35-year-old law student, died in judicial custody on 15 December 2024 at Parbhani in Maharashtra, India. His death occurred in the aftermath of mass arrests by the Maharashtra Police following protests against the desecration of a replica of the Indian Constitution happened in the city on 10 December 2024. The police initially claimed that his death was due to heart attack; however, his autopsy report showed the reason of his death as "shock after multiple injuries."

== Background ==
On 10 December 2024, a person, who was later identified as Sopan Pawar vandalized a replica of Indian Constitution kept in a glass enclosure near a statue of Dr. B. R. Ambedkar. The locals present there apprehended Pawar and handed him over to the police. A shutdown in protest was called by the local organizations on 11 December 2024. The protests were marred by some violence with protestors allegedly pelting stones and setting fire to empty vehicles. The police imposed prohibition on public gatherings and combed nearby localities to arrest about 50 people.

== Arrest and Death ==
Suryawanshi, a resident of Pune was on a visit to Parbhani to appear for his final-year law examination. Police took Suryawanshi to the Government Hospital, Parbhani, for alleged complaints of chest pain, where doctors declared him dead. Police initially claimed that he was not tortured.

As his death occurred in judicial custody, it was demanded by the Dalit organizations that his autopsy be conducted at a hospital with forensic facilities and should be done in-camera.

His preliminary autopsy report showed the cause of death as shock due to multiple injuries.

== Aftermath ==
Prakash Ambedkar, a prominent Dalit leader and a grandson of Dr. B. R. Ambedkar, reached Parbhani and pressed upon the administration to get the autopsy done in-camera at a government hospital with forensic facilities. Mahavikas Aghadi (MVA), the opposition coalition in the state, raised the issue of police brutality in the death of Suryawanshi in the winter session of the assembly.

On 4 July 2025, the Aurangabad bench of Bombay High Court observed that the death of Somnath Suryawanshi was a custodial death and violation of fundamental rights. The court ordered a First Information Report (FIR) to be filed within a week.
