= Maharashtra Police =

Law enforcement agency responsible for Maharashtra State

Maharashtra Police महाराष्ट्र पोलिस
- Insignia of Maharashtra State Police

- Uniform Patch

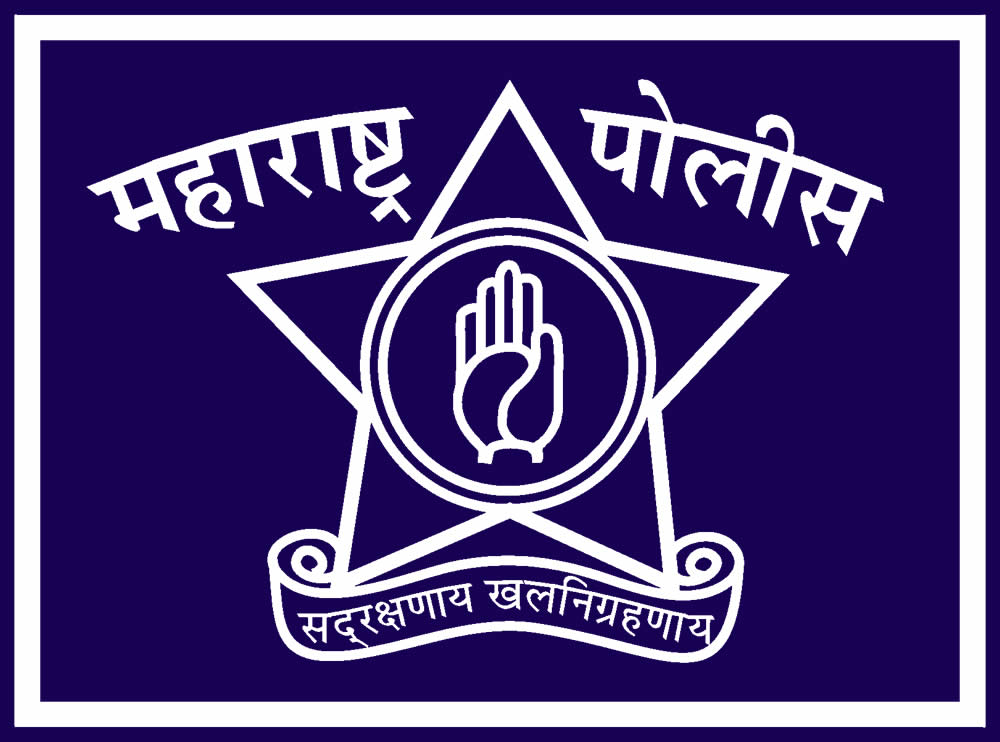
- Flag of the Maharashtra Police
- Abbreviation: म.पो.
- Motto: सद्रक्षणाय खलनिग्रहणाय (Sanskrit); To protect Good and to destroy Evil

Agency overview
- Formed: 2 January 1961
- Employees: 195,000
- Legal personality: Governmental: Government agency

Jurisdictional structure
- Operations jurisdiction: Maharashtra, IN
- Map of Maharashtra Police Department's jurisdiction
- Area: 307,713 km^{2} (118,809 sq mi)
- Population: 112,374,333(2011)
- Legal jurisdiction: Maharashtra
- Governing body: Government of Maharashtra
- General nature: Local civilian police

Operational structure
- Headquarters: Mumbai, Maharashtra
- Gazetted Officers: Superintendents of Police and Above: 277; Deputy Superintendents: 652
- Non-Gazetted officers and Constables: Police Inspectors: 3530; Assistant Police Inspectors: 4530; Sub Inspectors: 7601; Other Ranks: 150,000+
- Minister responsible: Devendra Fadnavis, Ministry of Home Affairs of Maharashtra
- Agency executive: Sadanand Date (IPS), Director General of Police
- Child agency: Mumbai City Police, Mira-Bhayander, Vasai-Virar Police, PCMC Pune Police, Nagpur City Police, Pune City Police, Thane City Police, Navi Mumbai City Police, Kolhapur City Police, Nashik City Police , Yavatmal Rural Police, Amravati City Police, Solapur City Police, Chhatrapati Sambhajinagar City Police, Nanded City Police

Facilities
- Police Stations: 1,165

Notables
- Anniversary: 2 January (Foundation Day)

Website
- mahapolice.gov.in

Maharashtra Police (IAST: Mahārāṣṭra Polīs Sēvā, formerly Bombay State Police) is the law enforcement agency responsible for the Indian state of Maharashtra. It is headed by Director General of Police, Sadanand Date (IPS), and headquartered in Mumbai, Maharashtra.

It is one of the largest police departments in the country, having about 36 district police units in the state. The Maharashtra Police Department has a strength of nearly 1.95 lakh. It also has 15,000 women in its force.

== History ==
During the 17th century (until 1655), the area of present-day Mumbai was under Portuguese control. The Portuguese formed a basic law enforcement structure in this area with the establishment of a Police outpost in 1661.

The origins of the present day Mumbai police can be traced back to a militia organized by Gerald Aungier, the then Governor of Bombay in 1669. This Bhandari Militia was composed of around 500 men and was headquartered at Mahim, Sevree and Sion. In 1672, the judicial overview of police decisions by courts was introduced, although none of the judges had any actual legal training. The situation remained unchanged through the Maratha wars. However, by 1682, policing remained stagnant. There was only one ensign for the whole Bhandari militia, and there were only three sergeants and two corporals.

In 1936, the Sind Province Police was split from the Bombay Province Police. In 1947, it was renamed to Bombay State Police, following India's independence. After the States Reorganisation Act, 1956, the Bombay State Police was divided into Gujarat Police, Mysore Police (later renamed Karnataka Police) and Maharashtra Police.

The Maharashtra Police Headquarters moved into what was known as the Royal Alfred Sailors' Home, in 1896. Construction began on the building in early 1872 and was finished four years later, in 1876. As its name suggests, it was made to accommodate 20 officers and 100 seamen. However, the building was actually conceived to commemorate the visit of the Duke of Edinburgh in 1870. The Duke laid the Foundation stone during his visit.

The Maharashtra government acquired the building in 1928 to house the Bombay Legislative Council. The Police Department subsequently moved in after it was vacated.

== Headquarters ==
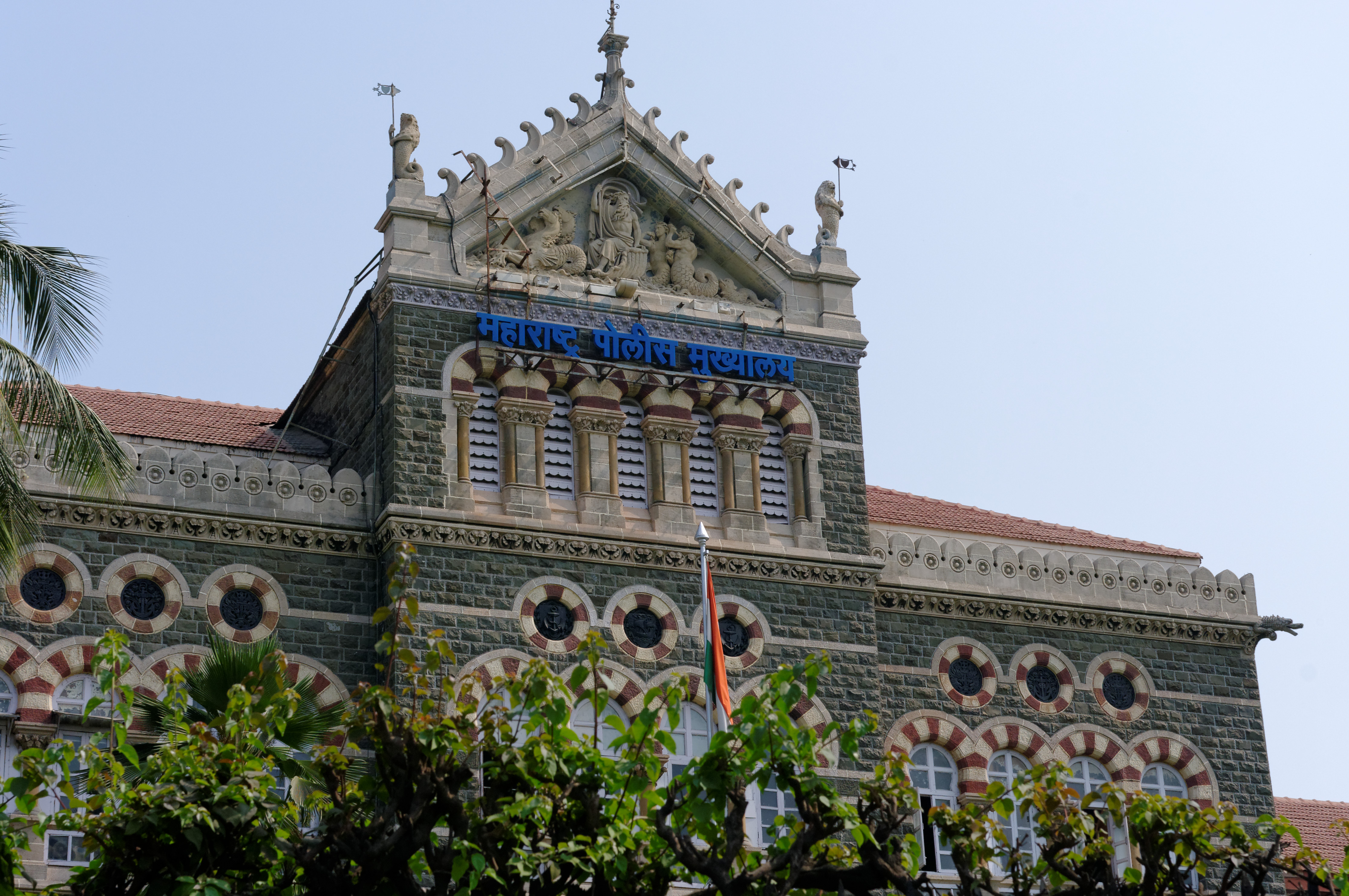
Maharashtra Police Headquarters in Mumbai.

The Maharashtra Police Headquarters is in a Grade I listed its heritage building that was built between 1872 and 1876 and designed by Frederick William Stevens (who designed the Victoria Terminus). During the British Raj, it served as the Royal Alfred Sailors' Home, named after Prince Alfred, the second son of Queen Victoria and Prince Albert, who visited Bombay in 1870. The building was used to house sick European sailors. After 1928, it served as the Legislative Assembly and then the Bombay Council Hall until 1982, when the Maharashtra Police moved into the building.

== List of Former Director General of Police ==
1. Kaikhusru Jahangir Nanavati - 01.05.1960 - 24.02.1965
2. Sayyad Majidulla - 25.02.1965 - 19.01.1968
3. Anant Ganesh Rajadhyaksha - 20.01.1968 - 28.02.1975
4. Maharudra Ganpatrao Wagh - 01.03.1975 - 31.05.1976
5. Immanuel Sumitra Modak - 01.06.1976 - 31.03.1978
6. Madhukar Ganpat Mugve - 01.04.1978 - 31.05.1978
7. Shridhar Vyankatesh Tankhiwala - 01.06.1978 - 31.07.1978
8. Vinayak Vasudev Chaubal - 01.08.1978 - 31.10.1979
9. Vasant Vinayak Nagarkar - 01.11.1979 - 18.03.1980
10. Ramdas Laxman Bhinge - 19.03.1980 - 23.02.1981
11. Sushilkumar Chaturvedi - 24.02.1981 - 24.02.1982
12. Krushnakant Pandurang Medhekar - 25.02.1982 - 30.04.1985
13. Suryakant Shankar Jog - 01.05.1985 - 31.07.1987
14. Dattatraya Shankar Soman - 01.08.1987 - 31.05.1988
15. Satyandra Prasanna Singh - 01.06.1988 - 31.01.1989
16. Ramakant Sheshgirirao Kulkarni - 01.02.1989 - 31.12.1989
17. Vasant Keshav Saraf - 01.01.1990 - 31.08.1992
18. S. Ramamurti - 01.09.1992 - 30.06.1993
19. Shivajirao Vitthalrao Baravkar - 01.07.1993 - 31.10.1994
20. S. V. Krushnan - 01.11.1994 - 31.10.1995
21. Surendra Mohan Pathaniya - 01.11.1995 - 31.05.1996
22. Amarjit Singh Samara - 01.06.1996 - 30.09.1997
23. Arvind Siddheswar Inamdar - 01.10.1997 - 05.01.2000
24. Subhash Chandra Malhotra - 06.01.2000 - 30.06.2003
25. Om Prakash Bali - 01.07.2003 - 31.10.2003
26. Surendra Mohan Shangari - 01.11.2003 - 31.08.2004
27. Kamal Krishna Kashyap - 01.09.2004 - 30.04.2005
28. Dr. P. S. Pasricha - 01.05.2005 - 29.02.2008
29. Anami Naraayan Roy - 01.03.2008 - 07.02.2009
30. S. S. Virak - 14.03.2009 - 31.10.2009
31. Anami Narayan Roy - 22.01.2010 - 31.05.2010
32. D. Sivanandhan - 31.05.2010 - 28.02.2011
33. Ajit Parasnis - 28.02.2011 - 30.09.2011
34. K. Subramanyam - 30.09.2011 - 31.07.2012
35. Sanjeev Dayal - 31.07.2012 - 30.09.2015
36. Praveen Dixit - 30.09.2015 - 31.07.2016
37. Satish Mathur - 01.08.2016 - 30.06.2018
38. Dr. D. D. Padsalgikar - 01.07.2018 - 28.02.2019
39. S. K. Jayaswal - 01.03.2019 - 07.01.2021
40. Hemant Nagrale - 07.01.2021 - 17.03.2021
41. Rajneesh Seth - 18.03.2021 - 10.04.2021
42. Sanjay Pande - 10.04.2021 - 18.02.2022
43. Rajneesh Seth - 18.02.2022 - 31.12.2023
44. Vivek Pansalkar - 31.12.2023 - 09.01.2024
45. Rashmi Shukla - 09.01.2024 - 05.11.2024
46. Sanjay Verma- 05.11.2024 - 25.11.2024
47. Rashmi Shukla - 25.11.2024- 02.01.2026
48. Sadanand Date - 03.01.2026-Incumbent

== Hierarchy ==
=== Officers ===
- Director general of police (DGP)
- Additional Director General of Police (ADGP)
- Inspector general of police (IGP)
- Deputy inspector general of police Commissioner of police of (CP)
- Senior superintendent of police (SSP)/Additional commissioner of police metro City (ACP)
- Superintendent of police (SP)/Deputy commissioner of police metro City (DCP)
- Additional Superintendent of Police (Addl.SP)
- Assistant Superintendent/ Deputy Superintendent of Police (ASP/DySP)

=== Subordinates ===
- Police Inspector (PI)
- Assistant Police Inspector (API)
- Police Sub-Inspector (PSI)
- Assistant Sub Inspector of Police (ASI)
- Head constable (HC)
- Police Naik (PN)
- Police Constable (PC)

== Insignia of Maharashtra Police (State Police) ==
=== Gazetted Officers ===
Indian Police Service cadre officers rank insignia
Insignia
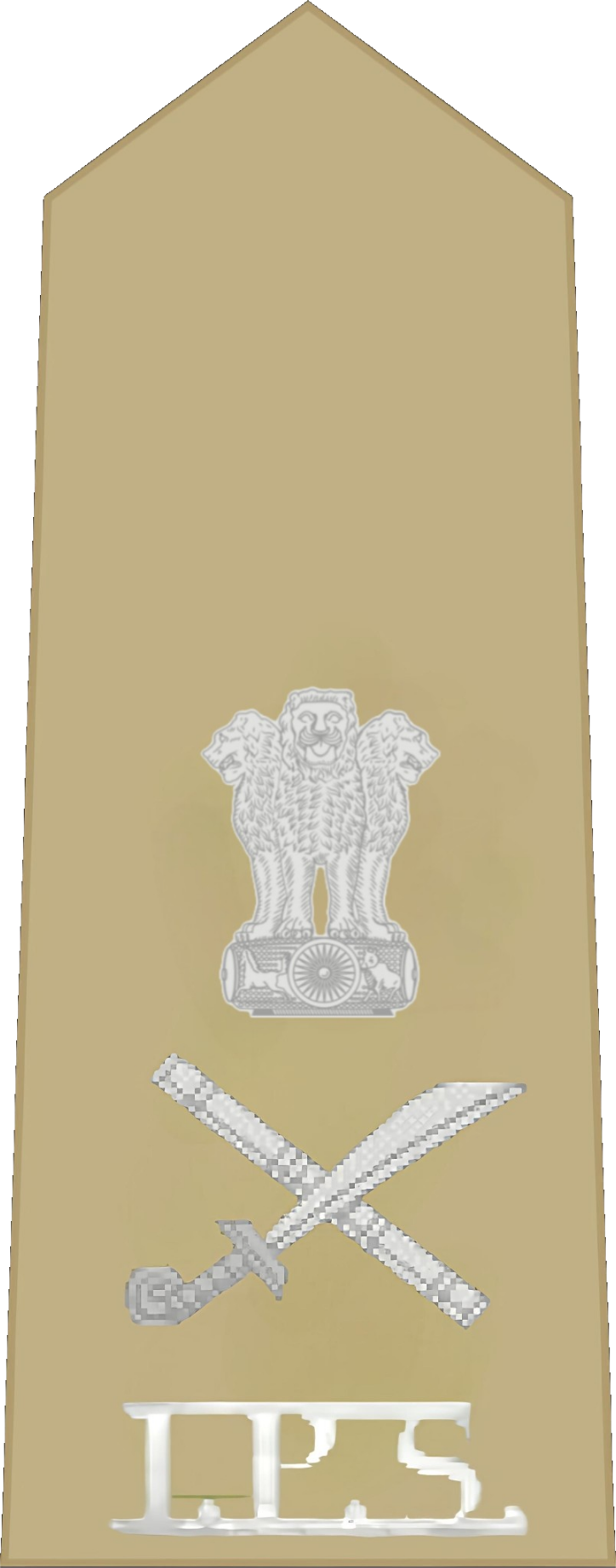
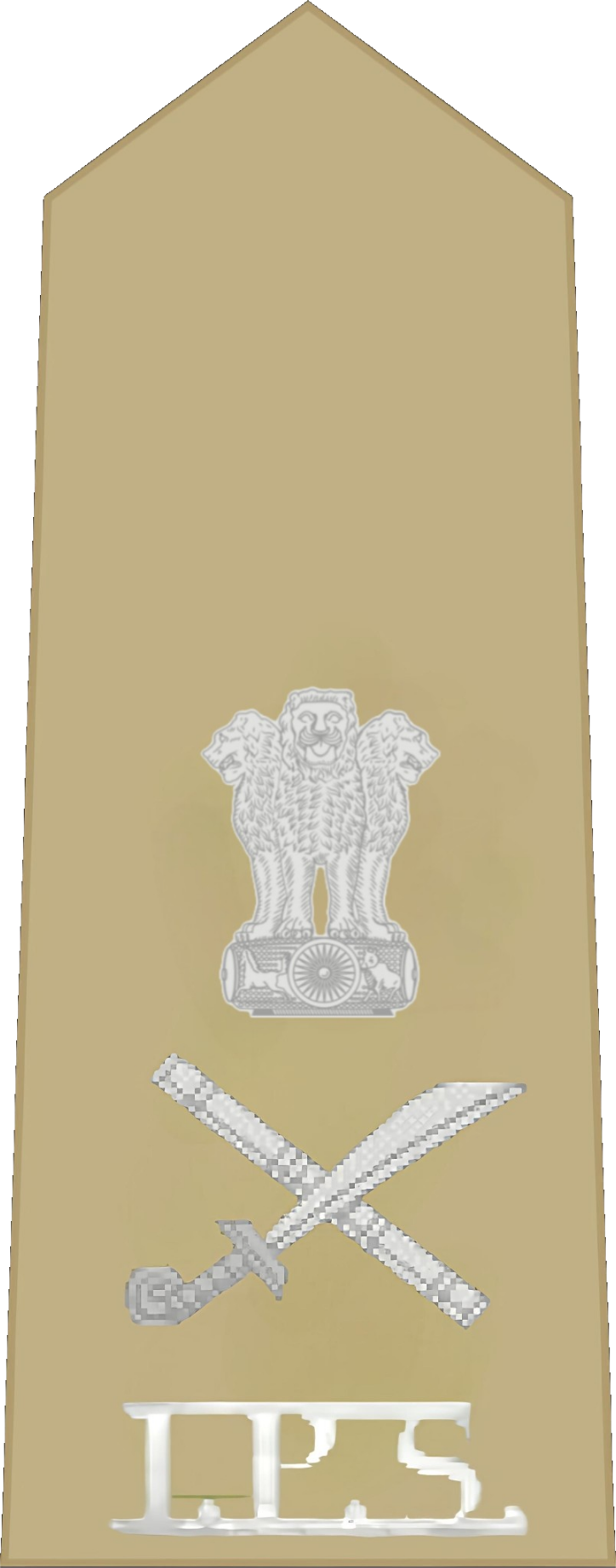
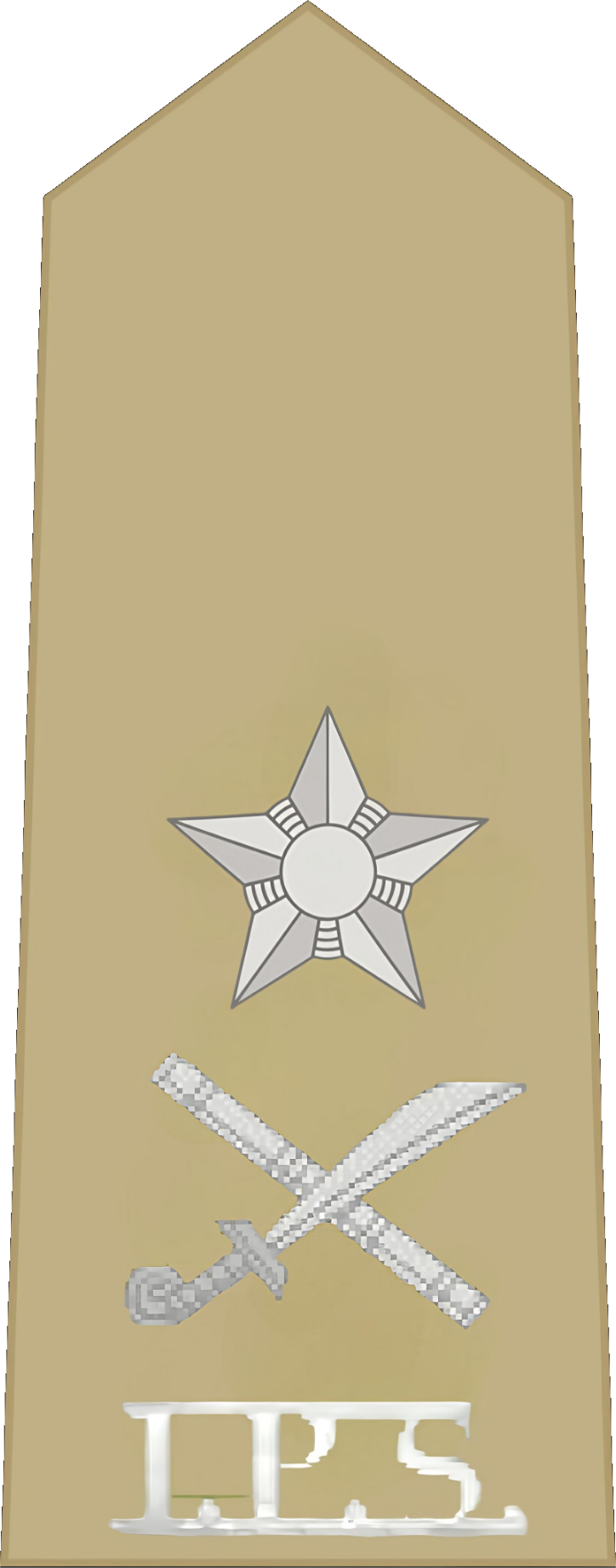
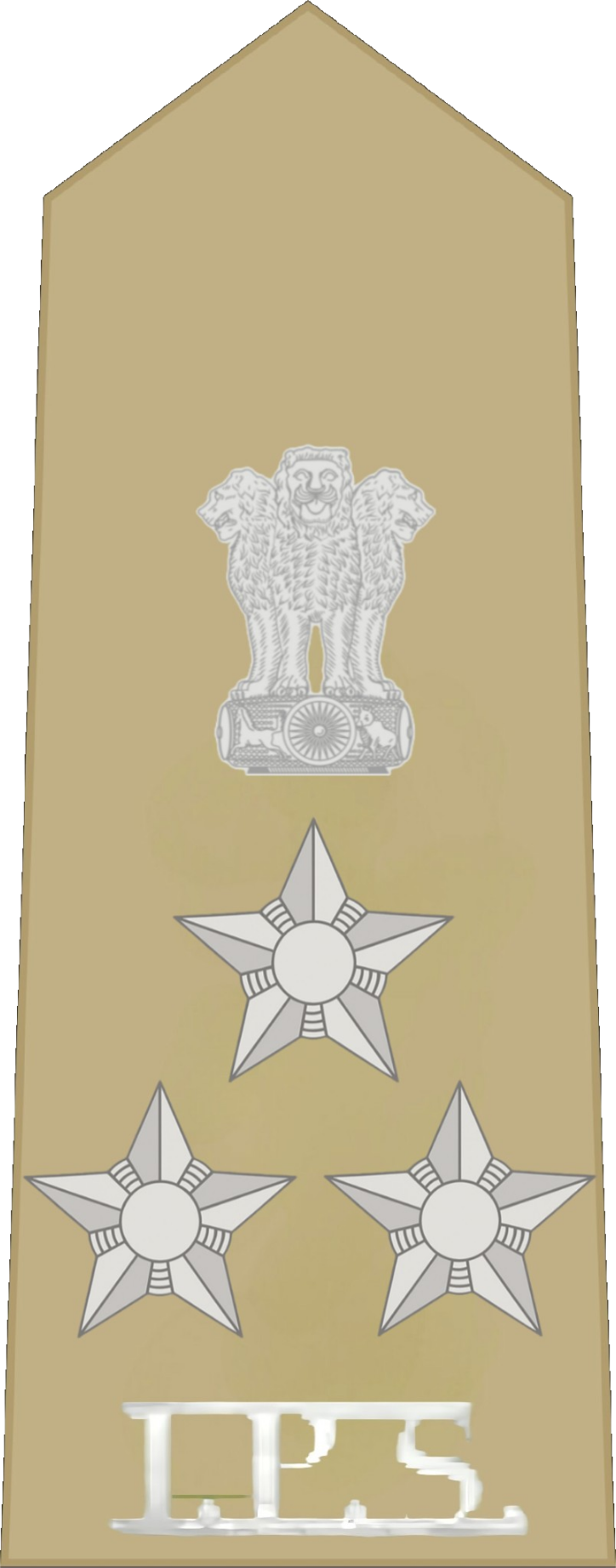
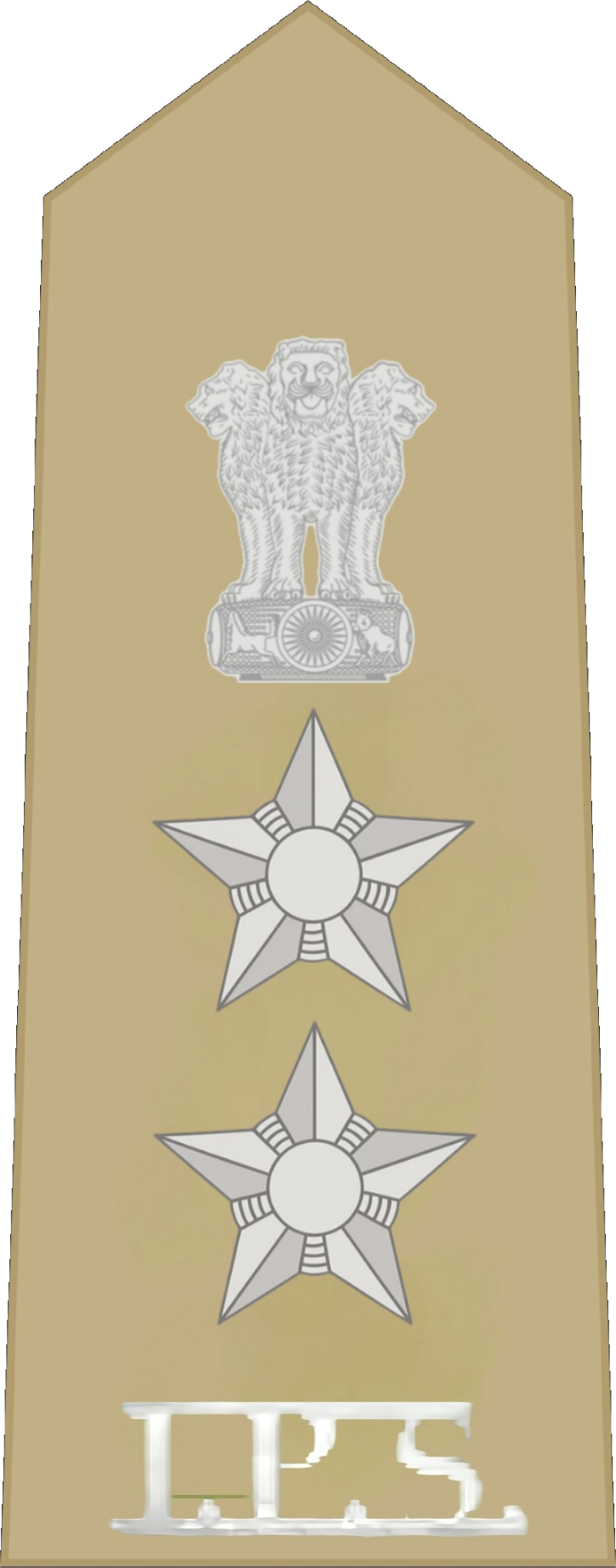
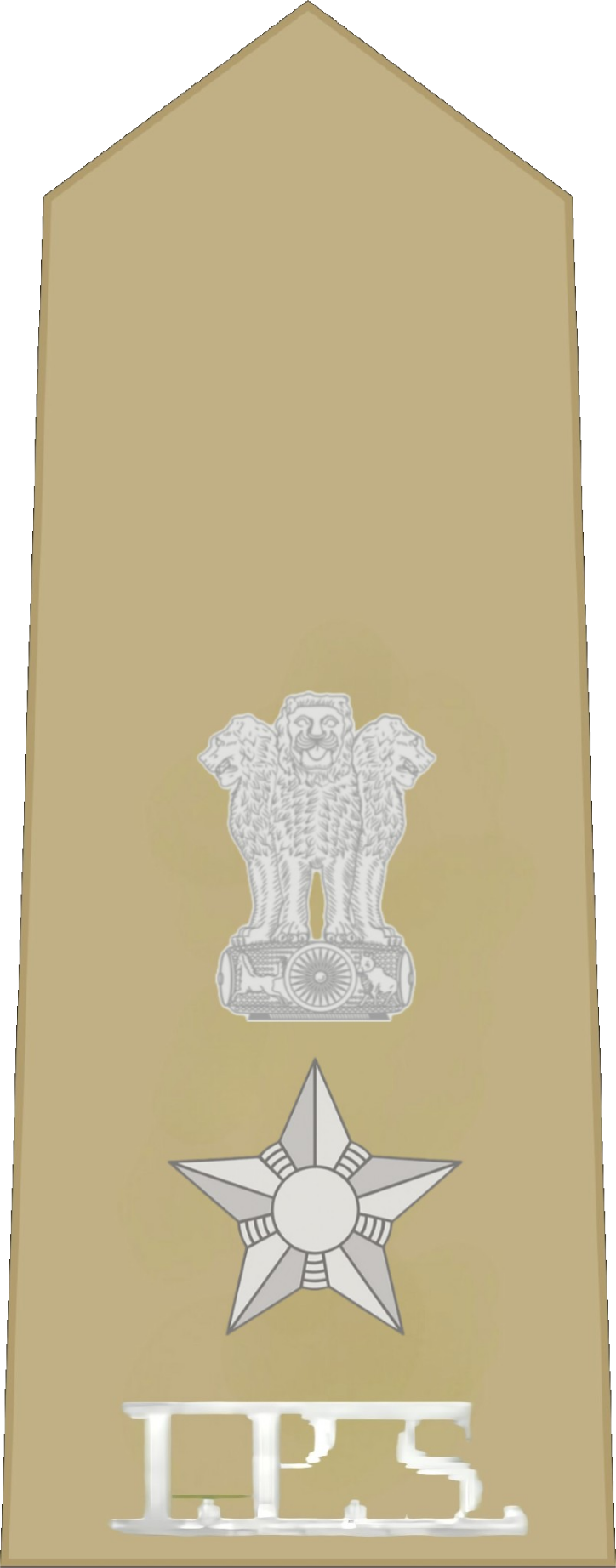
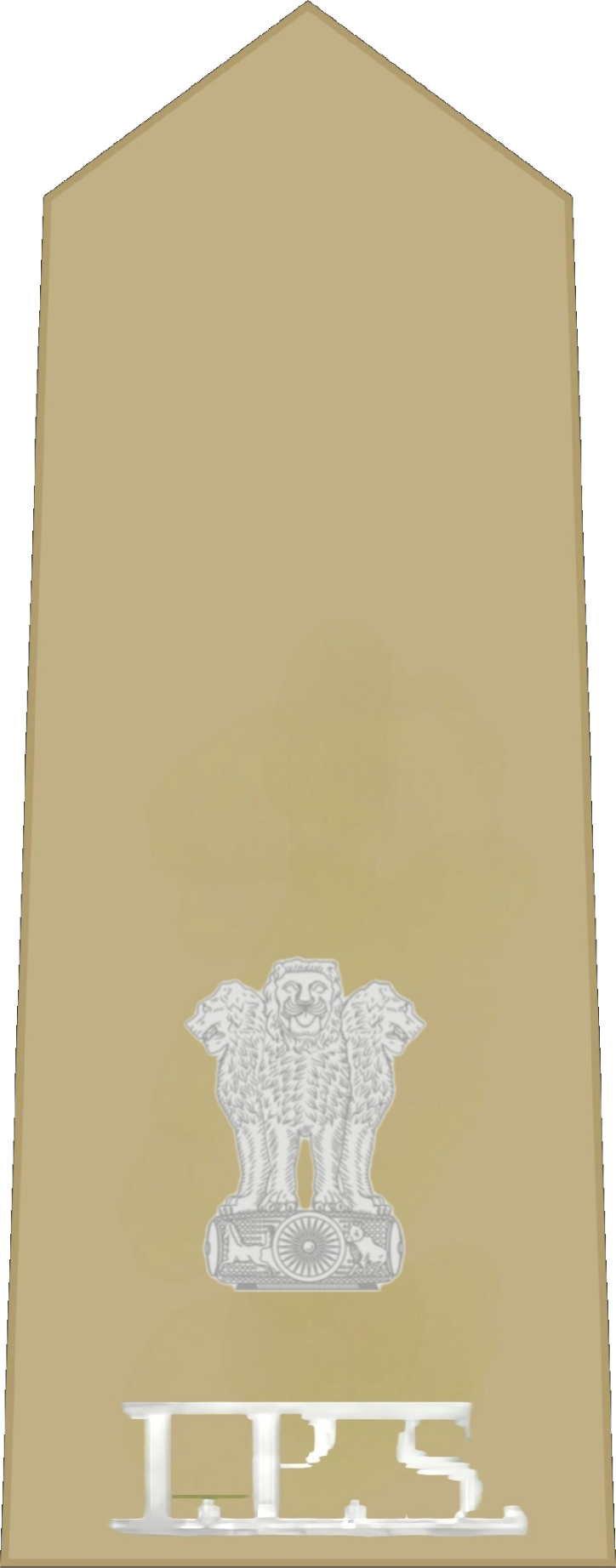
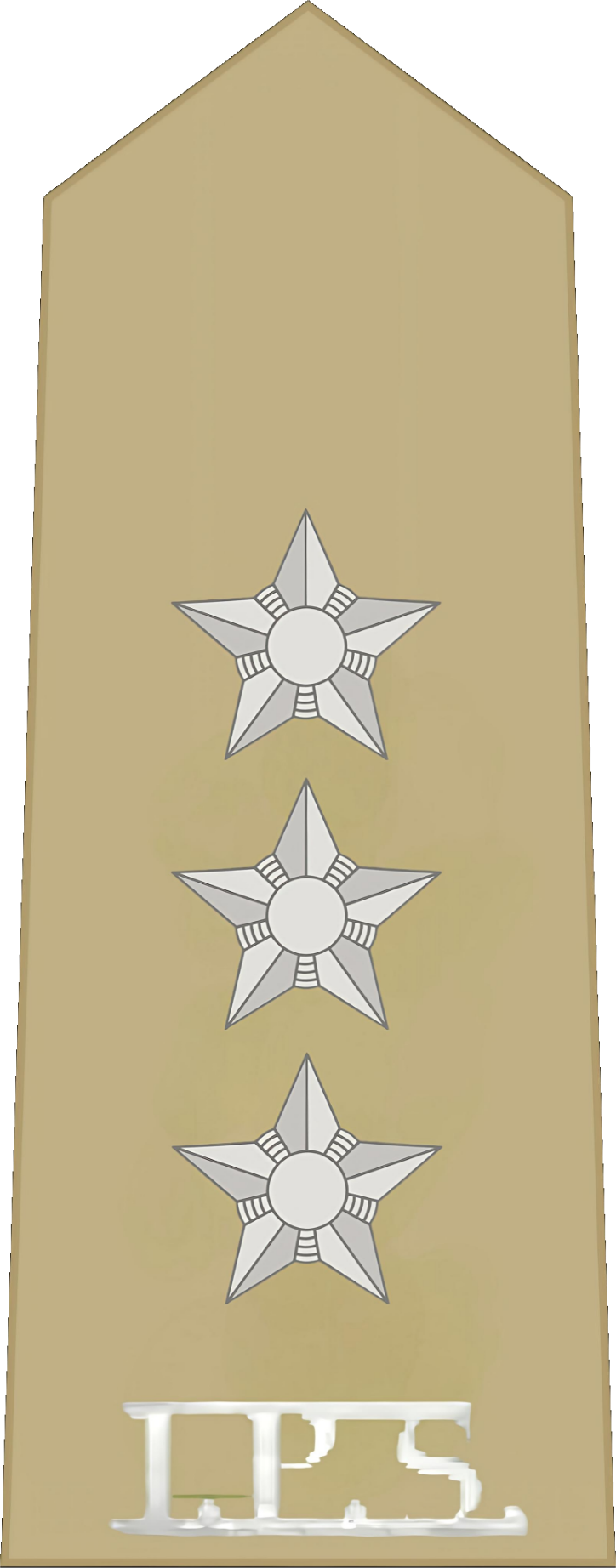
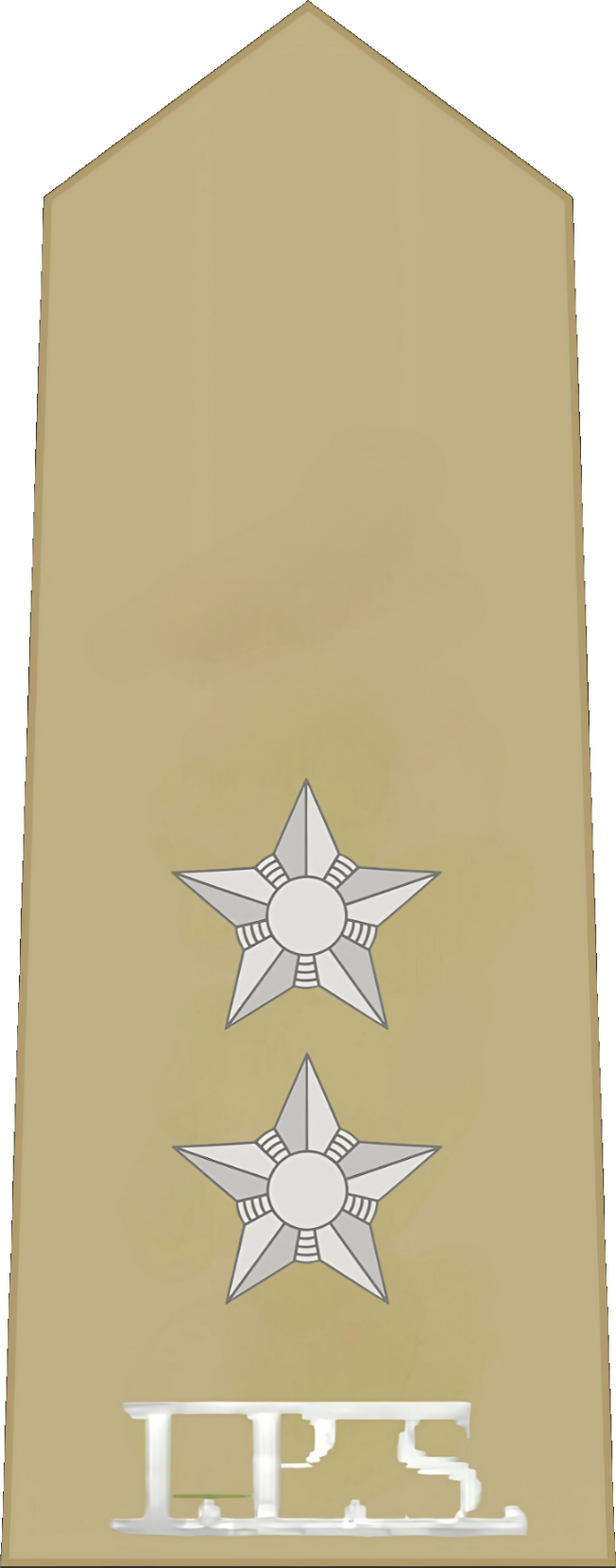
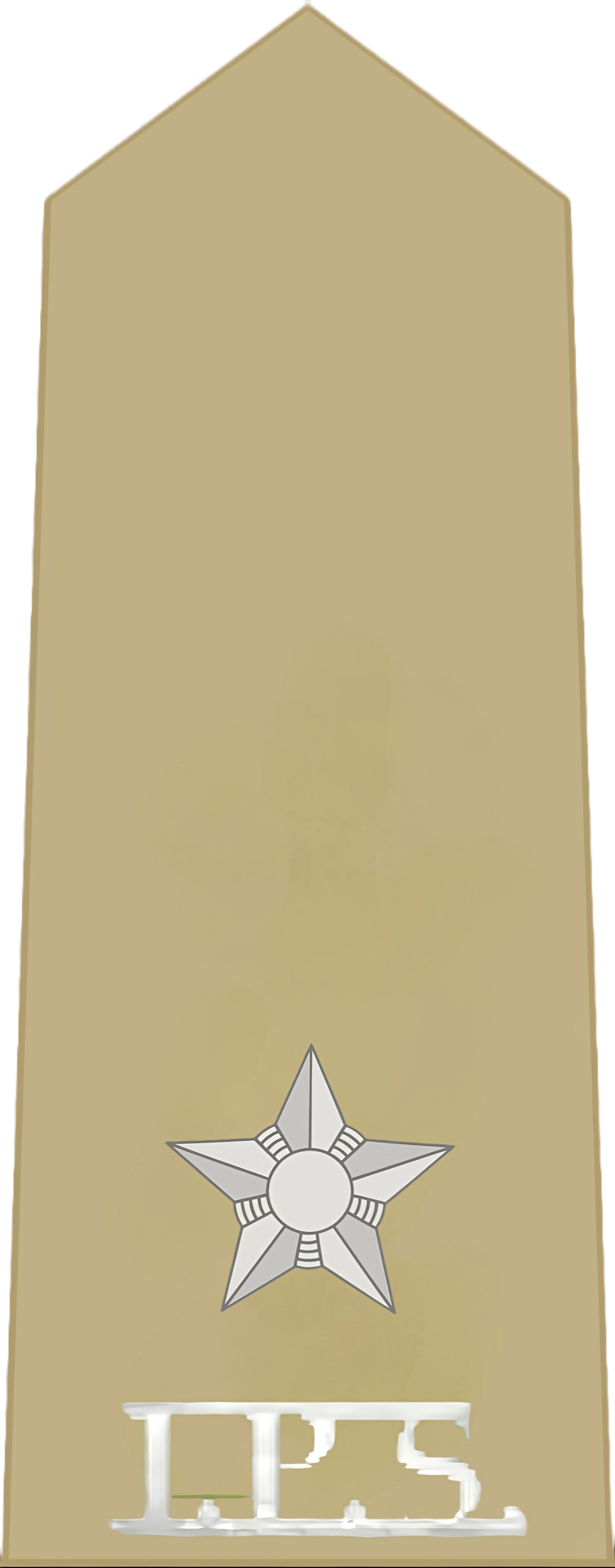
Rank
Director General of Police
Additional Director General of Police (Note: Rank insignia of DGP is similar to Additional DGP.)
Inspector General of Police
Deputy Inspector General of Police
Superintendent of Police (Selection Grade) (Note: The Senior Superintendent of Police (SSP) is a post, not a rank, typically held by an SP (selection grade or junior grade) in states like Uttar Pradesh, Jammu and Kashmir, and Punjab.)
Superintendent of Police
Additional superintendent of police
Assistant Superintendent of Police
Assistant superintendent of police (Probationary for two years)
Assistant Superintendent of Police (Probationary for one year)
Abbreviation
DGP
ADGP
IGP
DIGP
SP (SG)
SP
Addl.SP
ASP
ASP
ASP

- Note 1: The rank insignia of DGP, Spl.DGP, Addl.DGP is the same.
- Note 2: The equivalent rank to the ASP (Asst.SP) in State Police Services is the deputy superintendent of police (DSP/DySP).
- Note 3: The commissioner of police is a post typically held by DIG and above rank officers.

State Police Services rank insignia
Insignia

Rank

Superintendent of police (Note: In an armed police battalion, the equivalent rank is "Commandant.)
Additional superintendent of police (Note: In an armed police battalion, the equivalent rank is Deputy Commandant)
Deputy superintendent of police (Note: In an armed police battalion, the equivalent rank is Assistant Commandant.)

Abbreviation

SP
Addl.SP
DSP/Dy.SP

- Note: Gazetted officers in State Police Services (SPS) begins from DSP and above.
- In the Indian Police Service (IPS), rank starts from Assistant Superintendent of Police (ASP), which is equivalent to DSP in state services.

=== Non-gazetted officers ===
Subordinate officers rank insignia
Insignia
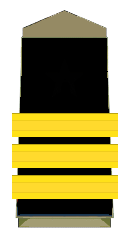
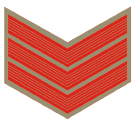
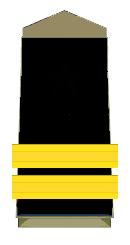
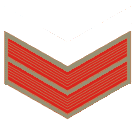
No insignia
Rank
Police Inspector (Note: One-star rank insignia only used in the West Bengal Police. All other police forces use the three-star with red and blue band rank insignia.)
Assistant police inspector (Note: This rank exists only in the Maharashtra Police.)
Sub-inspector
Assistant sub-inspector
Head constable (Note: Shoulder insignia rank only used in the Maharashtra Police.)
Senior Constable (Note: This rank is also known as senior constable, constable grade-I, and exists only in some state police forces.)
Police constable
Abbreviation
PI
API
PSI
ASI
HC
PN
PC
- Assistant Police Inspector (API) only exist in Maharashtra Police.
- Senior constable is also known as Police Naik.

== Special units ==
=== State Intelligence Department ===
The State Intelligence Department (SID) came into existence in 1905 as the Criminal Investigation Department (CID) and was renamed to its current name in 1981. It is headed by the Commissioner of Intelligence.

=== Maharashtra State Criminal Investigation Department ===
Maharashtra State Criminal Investigation Department (CID) is a Crime Branch which was established in 1905 and is headquartered in Pune. It is headed by the Additional Director General of Police.

=== Anti-Terrorism Squad ===
The Anti-Terrorism Squad (ATS) unit was created by the Government of Maharashtra in 2004 for countering terrorism. It works in coordination with Central Agencies such as Intelligence Bureau (IB) and Research and Analysis Wing (RAW).

=== Maharashtra Cyber Department ===
The Maharashtra Cyber Department, also known as Maharashtra Cyber, is the cybercrime investigation and digital security division of the Maharashtra Police. It was established by the Government of Maharashtra in 2016 to address the growing threat of cybercrime in the state. The department is responsible for preventing, detecting, and investigating cybercrimes across Maharashtra and undertakes digital forensics, cyber intelligence, and public awareness initiatives related to online safety.

=== Quick Response Team ===
The Quick Response Team (QRT) was created to protect the coasts of Maharashtra. Since Mumbai is vulnerable to attacks from terrorists and underworld elements, there was a need for a highly trained, motivated, young, fit and fully equipped team to tackle such groups and to terminate hostage situations. This team responds in the shortest time, moves by fastest means, takes action to collect tactical information, and neutralizes the threat. They rescue hostages and render assistance to central forces and other state forces on government duty. On the occasion of the 30th Maharashtra Road Safety Week, Maharashtra police launched the "Cop for a Day" Program; this new initiative allows any citizen to be a part of the Maharashtra Police Force for one day and be associated with different departments within the Maharashtra police

=== Anti-Corruption Bureau ===
Anti Corruption Bureau, Maharashtra is an agency of Government of Maharashtra constituted to investigate offences of bribery and corruption falling within the purview of Prevention of Corruption Act, 1988 in the state of Maharashtra.

=== Force One ===
Force One is an elite counter-terrorism unit of the Maharashtra Police. It guards the Mumbai Metropolitan Region, which is one of the largest metropolitan areas in the world. It was formed by Government of Maharashtra on the lines of National Security Guard (NSG) as a response to the 2008 Mumbai attacks and was commissioned two days before its first anniversary.

A list of the Indian Police Service (IPS) and State Police Service (SPS) officers of Force One is given below:

List of the IPS and SPS officers of Force One
S. No	Name	Designation
1	Dr. Sukhvinder Singh, IPS (1994:MH)	Additional Director General of Police, Force One, Maharashtra State, Mumbai
2	Sh. Kirankumar Chavan, SPS	S.P, Force One, Maharashtra State, Mumbai
3	Sh. Sandeep R. Doiphode, SPS	S.P, Force One, Urban Counter Training Academy, Maharashtra State, Mumbai
4	Sh. Amarsingh Jadhav, SPS	Addl. S.P., Force One, Urban Counter Training Academy, Maharashtra State, Mumbai

=== Highway Traffic Police ===
The Highway Traffic Police branch was created in 1993 to monitor operations on Indian roads and highways.

=== State Reserve Police Force ===
The State Reserve Police Force (SRPF) was created on 6 March 1948 as a Special Armed Police Force of the State of Maharashtra.

It is a part of the Maharashtra Police and Maintenance of Law & Order,Anti-Naxal Operations in Gadchiroli, Security of Vital Installations,Feeding Training Units,Forest Guarding,Disaster Management, Other state election Dutys. The head of the SRPF is an officer of Additional Director General (ADG) rank. In Maharashtra, there are 20 SRPF units located in different districts. The first SRPF unit was Group 1, Pune, and the newly formed Group 20 is located at Varangaon, Bhusawal, in Jalgaon district. Every unit is commanded by an officer called the Commandant, who is a senior IPS officer or a Maharashtra Police Service officer. The units also have two or three DySP-rank officers called Assistant Commandants. There are 8 or more companies in all units. Each company is controlled by a Police Inspector-rank officer. Every company has a strength of 98–120 jawans, and each company is divided into 4 platoons. The platoons are controlled by PSI- or ASI-rank officers. The following are the SRPF groups in Maharashtra: Group 1 – Pune Group 2 – Pune Group 3 – Jalna Group 4 – Nagpur Group 5 – Daund, Pune Group 6 – Dhule Group 7 – Daund, Pune Group 8 – Goregaon, Mumbai Group 9 – Amravati Group 10 – Solapur Group 11 – Navi Mumbai Group 12 – Hingoli Group 13 – Gadchiroli Group 14 – Chhatrapati Sambhajinagar Group 15 – Gondia Group 16 – Kolhapur Group 17 – Chandrapur Group 18 – Katol, Nagpur Group 19 – Kusadgaon, Ahilyanagar Group 20 – Varangaon, Jalgaon

=== Other Departments ===
- Training Directorate
- Protection of Civil Rights Cell
- Motor Transport Unit: This was established in 1948 to cater to the needs of mobility of Maharashtra Police.
- State Police Wireless: Established before 1947
- State Disaster Response Force (SDRF): established in 19/05/2016 the main role of the SDRF is to carry out rescue and relief operations during natural and man-made disasters. There are two units of SDRF located in Dhule and Nagpur District.

== List of Police Commissionerate ==
There are total 12 Police Commissionerate in Maharashtra Police Department, i.e.

1. Greater Mumbai Police

2. Thane City Police

3. Navi Mumbai Police

4. Nashik City Police

5. Pune City Police

6. Solapur City Police

7. Chhatrapati Sambhajinagar Police

8. Amravati City Police

9. Nagpur City Police

10.Mumbai Railway Police

11. Pimpri-Chinchwad Police

12. Mira-Bhayandar, Vasai-Virar (MBVV) Police

=== Greater Mumbai Police ===
Mumbai Police (Marathi: मुंबई पोलीस, IAST: Mumbaī Pulīs, officially Greater Mumbai Police, formerly Bombay Police) is the police department of the city of Mumbai, Maharashtra. It is a part of Maharashtra Police and has the primary responsibilities of law enforcement and investigation within the limits of Mumbai.

=== Thane City Police ===
Thane City Police (Marathi: ठाणे शहर पोलीस) is the police department of the city of Thane City, Maharashtra. It is a part of Maharashtra Police and has the primary responsibilities of law enforcement and investigation within the limits of Thane City.

=== Navi Mumbai Police ===
Navi Mumbai Police (Marathi: नवी मुंबई पोलीस) is the police department of the city of Navi Mumbai, Maharashtra. It is a part of Maharashtra Police and has the primary responsibilities of law enforcement and investigation within the limits of Navi Mumbai.

=== Nashik City Police ===
Nashik City Police (Marathi: नाशिक शहर पोलीस) is the police department of the city of Nashik City, Maharashtra. It is a part of Maharashtra Police and has the primary responsibilities of law enforcement and investigation within the limits of Nashik City.

=== Pune City Police ===
Pune City Police (Marathi: पुणे शहर पोलीस) is the police department of the city of Pune City, Maharashtra. It is a part of Maharashtra Police and has the primary responsibilities of law enforcement and investigation within the limits of Pune City.

=== Solapur City Police ===
Solapur City Police (Marathi: सोलापूर शहर पोलीस) is the police department of the city of Solapur City, Maharashtra. It is a part of Maharashtra Police and has the primary responsibilities of law enforcement and investigation within the limits of Solapur City.

=== Chhatrapati Sambhajinagar Police ===
Chhatrapati Sambhajinagar Police (Marathi: छत्रपती संभाजीनगर पोलीस, is the police department of Chhatrapati Sambhajinagar, Maharashtra. It is a part of Maharashtra Police and has the primary responsibilities of law enforcement and investigation within the limits of Chhatrapati Sambhajinagar.

=== Amravati City Police ===
Amravati City Police (Marathi: अमरावती शहर पोलीस) is the police department of the city of Amravati, Maharashtra. It is a part of Maharashtra Police and has the primary responsibilities of law enforcement and investigation within the limits of Amravati City.

=== Nagpur City Police ===
Nagpur City Police (Marathi: नागपूर शहर पोलीस) is the police department of the city of Nagpur, Maharashtra. It is a part of Maharashtra Police and has the primary responsibilities of law enforcement and investigation within the limits of Nagpur.

=== Mumbai Railway Police ===
Mumbai Railway Police (Marathi: मुंबई लोहमार्ग पोलीस) covers the entire Railway Network starting from Gujarat border on Western Railways to Mumbai and from CSMT to Kasara and Khopoli stations on the Central Railway Network and from CSMT to Roha on the Harbour Railway Network. It is a part of Maharashtra Police and has the primary responsibilities of law enforcement and investigation within the limits of Railway Stations under its Jurisdiction.

=== Pimpri-Chinchwad Police ===
Pimpri-Chinchwad Police (Marathi: पिंपरी-चिंचवड पोलीस) is the police department of the city of Pimpri-Chinchwad, Maharashtra. It is a part of Maharashtra Police and has the primary responsibilities of law enforcement and investigation within the limits of Pimpri-Chinchwad.

=== Mira-Bhayander, Vasai-Virar (MBVV) Police ===
Mira-Bhayander, Vasai-Virar (MBVV) Police (Marathi: मीरा-भायंदर, वसई-विरार पोलीस) is the police department of the twin cities of Mira-Bhayandar and Vasai-Virar, Maharashtra.The Mira-Bhayandar Vasai-Virar (MBVV) Police Commissionerate was officially established on 1 October 2020. It is a part of Maharashtra Police and has the primary responsibilities of law enforcement and investigation within the limits of Mira-Bhayandar and Vasai-Virar cities

== Criticism and controversies ==
The Maharashtra Police has been involved in controversies. It includes police brutality, corruption, serving the political elite, misconduct, moral policing, as well as discrimination. The department has also been slammed for bootlicking of political leaders whether in power or opposition, as well as for leading in custodial deaths nationwide.

Between 1991 and 2004, there was no police action against Akku Yadav, a Nagpur-based gangster and serial rapist in the Kasturbha Nagar area, who was accused of raping several women, even minor girls. A lot of police personnel, who were in cahoots with Yadav, notified him every time a victim came forward to report his crime. Following several instances of inaction, the residents burned down Yadav's house; fearing for his life, he surrendered himself at the nearest police station where he was given preferential treatment several times. On 13 August 2004, a bail hearing was scheduled for Yadav at the Nagpur District Court. While being taken to the courtroom, Yadav mocked a minor rape victim by calling her a prostitute and said that he will rape her again, following which police officials guarding him started laughing. Provoked by his statement, the victim, joined by a mob of women with many of them being rape victims, started beating him mercilessly. He begged for forgiveness but the women refused to stop and he died after being stabbed several times during the mob lynching; the officers on guard were terrified and fled the scene after chili powder was thrown on them. Retired judge Bhau Vahane defended the women and justified their actions, stating that "If they took law into their hands, it was because the law and law-enforcing agencies had not given them any succor and legal protection." In 2014, it was reported that all of the remaining accused in the Akku Yadav's murder case were released due to a lack of evidence. Akku Yadav's criminal history was a notable case of police inaction and apathy, as well as vigilante justice.

The Maharashtra Police were accused of covering up the Khairlanji massacre by shielding the perpetrators in September 2006, where 4 members of a Dalit family were brutally murdered. Following the allegations of a police coverup, the CBI took over the case, who charged the perpetrators for murder, criminal conspiracy, outraging the modesty of women, and unlawful assembly.

Following the 2008 Mumbai attacks that took place from 26 to 29 November 2008, an inquiry commission setup by the Government revealed several flaws and failures. One of them was the improper training among the police force to deal with such situations, but the report also cited the lack of sophisticated and modern weaponry and equipment, while having outdated weapons, which were rendered obsolete by the Central Government. The attacks eventually led to the creation of an elite force named as Force One to deal with such situations.

In January 2020, the Anti-Corruption Bureau revealed that the Maharashtra Police has been the most corrupt, with assets worth Rs. 40 million amassed by police personnel. In its bribery list released for 2019 by the anti-corruption bureau (ACB), the Maharashtra Police department was noted to be the most corruption complaints against it among 44 state government departments.

Following the lynching of 2 sadhus in Palghar on 16 April 2020, who were mistaken for child snatchers and organ harvesters, two police officers of Inspector rank were suspended for inaction, after a video of one of the sadhus pleas to one officer to saved his life that went unheeded became viral. The leaders of opposition, as well as several Sadhus demanded an investigation and swift action against the culprits.

In September 2023, it was noted that Maharashtra Police was among the worst performing states regarding compliance with the 2006 Supreme Court ruling on police reforms, as per former IPS officers Julio Ribeiro and Prakash Singh. As per Singh, Maharashtra, was among the states that were the most defiant voices against the police reforms right after the Supreme Court ruling.

On 19 October 2023, Somnath Zende, a Sub-Inspector posted in Pune, was suspended after it was revealed that he won Rs 15 million on Dream11, a lottery based phone application. While the application Dream11 was legal as per the Supreme Court, senior officers stated that Zende violated the police norms as he gave an interview in uniform and used his phone on duty. However, Zende clarified that he only used the phone application when he was off-duty.

In October 2024, a report came out that several police officers in the department were facing the challenges of having basic facilities. It included traveling on public transport but without tickets due inadequate or quick transportation to visit crime scenes, besides lower salaries and no over time pay. Despite submitting bills when on official travel, several officers stated that they were often rejected and not reimbursed for their expenses.

In December 2024, some officers of Maharashtra Police were involved in the custodial death of Somnath Suryawanshi. The initial attempt at obscuring his cause of death prompted more concerns about police brutality. On 4 July 2025, the Aurangabad bench of Bombay High Court observed that the death of Suryawanshi was a custodial death and violation of fundamental rights, and the court ordered a First Information Report (FIR) to be filed within a week.

In May 2025, 75 senior Inspector rank personnel across Mumbai, Thane, Pune, and other places statewide, declined promotions to the rank of ACP or DySP, thereby facing a disciplinary proceedings, despite being eligible. Many of them stated departmental inquiries, adverse remarks on service records, as well as certain personal reasons, or relocation.

== Paid service ==
The Maharashtra police provide paid security service to the Board of Control for Cricket in India (BCCI) and other cricket administrators during cricket matches for stadium security. The payment for it goes to the Maharashtra government; for One day international it charge ₹50 lakh, for Twenty20 - ₹60 lakh and for Test ₹35 lakhs. Opposite to India in foreign countries such as Australia, England, their cricket boards hire private security agencies for the stadium security. Prior, the charge to provide security for cricket matches was different in Mumbai, Pune but 27 June 2023 onwards the amount per game will be equal for all the towns.
