= Chowky =

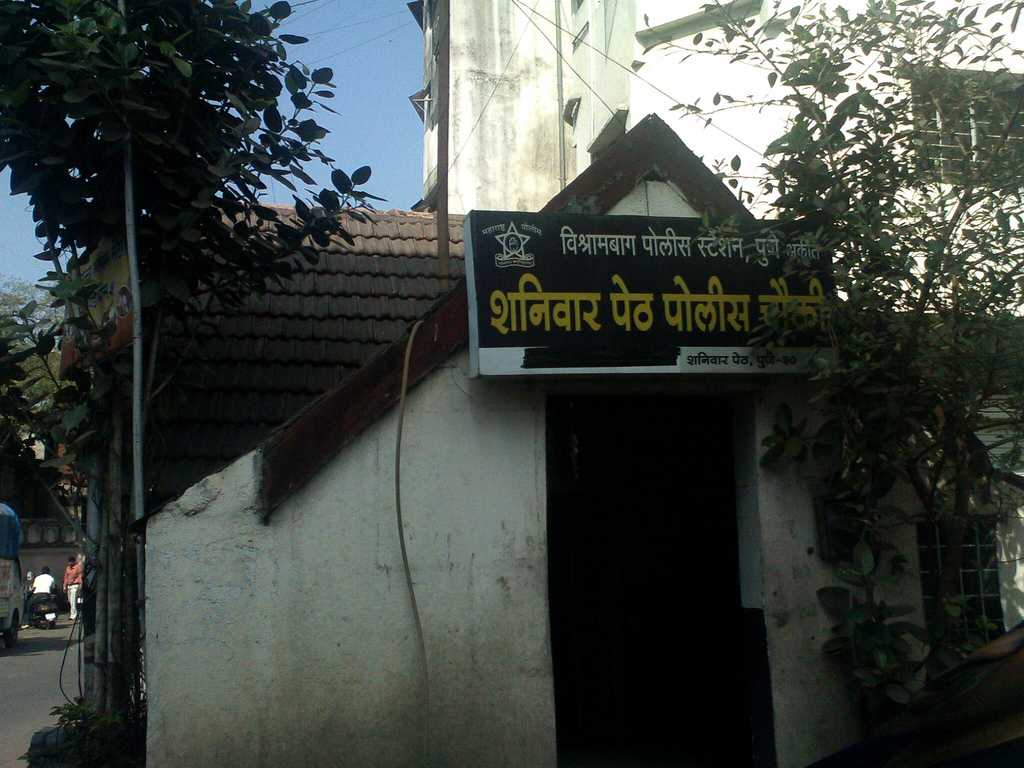
A police chowky in Shaniwar Peth, Pune

A chowky (Hindi: चौकी chaukee, also spelled chowkey, chauky and chauki) is a police workstation, gatehouse or police box in the Indian Police, and is the basic unit of police presence in any area. Each chowky is under the charge of a sub-inspector. There are typically more chowkies than stations in a state police force, for example in Maharashtra.
