= State Intelligence Department =

India's internal intelligence agency

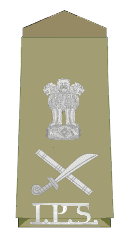
- Rank Insignia of the Police Commissioner (Director General Rank)
- Abbreviation: SID

Jurisdictional structure
- Operations jurisdiction: Maharashtra, India
- Governing body: Government of Maharashtra

Operational structure
- Headquarters: Mumbai, Maharashtra
- Elected officer responsible: Devendra Fadnavis, Ministry of Home Affairs
- Agency executive: Ashutosh K. Dumbre, IPS, Police Commissioner
- Parent agency: Maharashtra Police
- Child agency: Maharashtra Intelligence Academy

Website
- http://mahapolice.gov.in/state-intelligence-department/

The State Intelligence Department (SID) is the intelligence agency of Maharashtra. The agency's primary function is gathering intelligence, counter-terrorism, Counter-proliferation, and advising Maharashtra policymakers. It is one of the oldest such organization in India. It is headed by the Commissioner of Intelligence.

== History ==
The State Intelligence Department was established in 1905 during the colonial rule in India, originally known as the Criminal Investigation Department (CID) (Intelligence Wing). The establishment of the department was recommended by the Frazer Commission to enhance the intelligence capabilities of the state police.

Initially headquartered in Pune, the CID (Intelligence Wing) was tasked with gathering intelligence on political, security, communal, and labor activities, as well as any threats to law and order. In 1981, the department underwent reorganization and was renamed the State Intelligence Department (SID).

== Responsibilities ==
Department deals with collection, collation, analysis and dissemination of information in on such as political, security, communal, labour activity, security concerns and matter affecting law and order.

== Phone tapping ==
Intelligence department came into mainstream news due to unauthorized phone tapping issue which led to resignation as well as transfers of several high level officials.

== See also ==
- R&AW
- National Investigation Agency
- Mass surveillance in India
- List of Indian intelligence agencies
