= Zarrar Shah =

Pakistani terrorist (born 1979)

- ضرار شاہ
- Born: Abdul Wajid; 16 April 1979 (age 47); Nangal Sahdan, Ferozewala Tehsil, Sheikhupura District, Punjab, Pakistan
- Other name: Rana
- Years active: 2006–2008; 2008–present (alleged by journalist Sebastian Rotella)
- Organization: Lashkar-e-Taiba
- Known for: 2008 Mumbai attacks
- Parent: Nazir Ahmed
- Criminal charges: Anti-Terrorism Act 1997; Mass murder; Aiding and abetting; Cyberterrorism
- Wanted by: National Investigation Agency (India); Federal Bureau of Investigation (United States)
- Accomplices: Zakiur Rehman Lakhvi; Sajid Mir; Abu Jundal

Details
- Date apprehended: 10 December 2008
- Imprisoned at: Central Jail Rawalpindi (also known as Adiala Jail)

Zarrar Shah (Urdu: ضرار شاہ, born 16 April 1979) is the Lashkar-e-Taiba's communications and technology chief, and also one of its primary liaisons with the Pakistani intelligence agency ISI. According to The New York Times, Shah is "a senior Lashkar commander" and "a central character" behind the plot of the 2008 Mumbai attacks. Fox News reports Shah communicated with gunmen over the telephone and helped direct their activities as he watched the events unfold on television.

== Early life ==
Shah was born on 16 April 1979, according to a report by ProPublica and Frontline. In a 2009 Pakistani First information report (FIR) released by the South Asia Terrorism Portal, Shah's birth name was listed as Abdul Wajid, Zarrar Shah and Rana were said to be his aliases. The FIR revealed his father's name was Nazir Ahmed, who was a resident of Nangal Sahdan village in Ferozewala Tehsil, Sheikhupura District. Shah's existence was known to Indian authorities since 2006 at least. According to a BBC Urdu article, Shah's real name was Qari Zarar, he was a member of the Harkat-ul-Ansar and he was involved in the 1995 kidnapping of western tourists in Kashmir. The article claimed he then came to Pakistan and joined the Jaish-e-Mohammed, and was wanted for terror cases in Pakistan.

In his late 20s, Shah became the emir (chief) of the Lashkar-e-Taiba (LeT) media unit. This relatively young chief attracted the attention of Indian, American and British agencies. By September 2008, British agencies including the GCHQ were monitoring most of his digital activity and communications. Shah was also the LeT's communications and technology chief, and one of its primary liaisons with the Pakistani intelligence agency ISI. Sometime in 2006, Indian terrorist Abu Jundal met Shah and Zakiur Rehman Lakhvi at the LeT camp in Muridke. LeT militant Aslam Kashmiri, arrested in August 2009, also admitted to meeting Shah and Lakhvi.

== 2008 Mumbai attacks ==
=== Planning ===
According to the confession of attacker Ajmal Kasab, on the 13th day of the month of Ramzan in 2008, Kasab and the nine other attackers met Shah, who taught them how to make an outgoing call from Pakistan appear like it was dialed from another country. They were told Shah had a media room with detailed information about places in other countries, chose targets from among them and then relayed the targets to Zakiur Rehman Lakhvi. On the same day, CD footage and maps of the targets were shown to the attackers. Kasab in particular was shown targets like the Chhatrapati Shivaji Terminus station (CSMT, previously the VT), Malabar Hill and city roads going to these two targets. The two attackers going to the Taj Mahal Palace Hotel were shown a 3D model of the hotel, created by its management as an advertising tool. The attackers could thus familiarize themselves with the architecture of the hotel, its entries and exits, and the city roads going to Leopold Cafe.

Kasab met Shah at a new LeT base in Muridke, where he and other attackers trained under Shah in the Daura-e-Riba course (intelligence gathering and accumulation). They were taught how to decrypt and encrypt digital communications and operate multiple communication channels. They were also tutored on digital reconnaissance and surveillance. Shah then distributed wireless radios, GPS equipment, and satellite phones of the Hughes and Ascom brands connected over Thuraya networks. Shah and his unit stayed at the base for a week to train the attackers. At the Baitul Mujahideen camp, they were told about the plan to attack Mumbai for the first time. At the camp, LeT chief Hafiz Saeed declared Lakhvi as the mission commander; the junior commanders appointed were Shah, Abu Hamza, Abu Kahafa, Yousuf Muzzamil, Alqama and Shahid Jamil Riaz. The ten attackers were then taken to the LeT base at Azizabad graveyard south of Gulberg Town. At this base, Shah had his media room with many electronic devices. In September 2008, Lakhvi and his junior commanders met to discuss the timeline of the attack.

On 20 October 2008, Shah contacted the New Jersey based company Callphonex to inquire about Voice over IP (VoIP) systems. He posed as Kharak Singh, a Mumbai-based telephone merchant. (Note: The Kharak Singh identity was created on 10 October 2008. It was operated from Karachi using Wateen and WorldCall Internet connections, and from Muzaffarabad using a SCO connection. According to Indian writer Rommel Rodrigues, the Kharak Singh identity was created by Javed Iqbal and Mohammad Atiq Ishfaq.) The VoIP system would make it look like calls between the Pakistani handlers and Mumbai attackers were originating in New Jersey and Austria. The VoIP services purchased by Shah were paid for by LeT members from Karachi and Barcelona. Meanwhile, at a training camp in Pakistan administered Kashmir (PaK), Shah and other LeT handlers showed the ten attackers how to navigate to their targets in Mumbai by using Google Earth. They mapped out the sea route to be taken, the landing area in Mumbai, and the city roads the attackers would use to reach their targets. According to Indian police officer Deven Bharti, the attackers were taught how to locate sites in Mumbai even before they arrived in the city, primarily by using Global Positioning System equipment. The attackers were shown video footage of their targets filmed by David Headley and received by Shah.

On 22 October, Shah looked up past terror attacks in India, and researched potential targets including the Taj Mahal Palace Hotel and luxury hotels in Delhi. He went over weather forecasts for the Arabian Sea, and checked if there were any ongoing naval exercises on the route. He put the VoIP system in place, which would make his outgoing calls appear like they were originating from area code 201 in New Jersey. In November, Callphonex asked why there had been no usage of its systems till then. Shah, using his disguise as Singh, said utilization would begin at the end of the month. Callphonex was also worried when the Kharak Singh email address, after every email sent, showed a new IP address located in different countries. The communications network used in the attacks was much more sophisticated, if not multiple generations ahead of Indian police systems.

Five Austrian Direct inward dial numbers were purchased from Callphonex and used by the terrorists. The New Jersey number also purchased was a virtual number, and it was used to route the calls from the handlers to the attackers. The New Jersey number was paid for by a MoneyGram payment. The five Austrian numbers were paid for by a Western Union transfer from Pakistan to an agent in Brescia, Italy. According to journalists Adrian Levy and Cathy Scott-Clark, this communication network was created by Shah working in concert with the Owls, a group of young and unemployed technology students recruited from Karachi, Dubai and Gulf countries. Callphonex inquired why the payment came from Pakistan when the services were purchased by an Indian, but did not receive a response.

On 21 November, Shah gave each attacker one Nokia cell phone with Indian SIM cards, which would activate only after they entered Mumbai waters. The attackers were told to switch their phones on only after they arrived in Mumbai. Lakhvi told the attackers Shah had stored a mobile number in their phones which they could call to talk to their handlers. The Nokia India and USA branches found these cellphones had unique IMEI numbers and were purchased from Nokia China by Pakistani sellers. On 22 November, Shah went along with the attackers as they travelled from the Azizabad base to Keti Bandar, where they boarded the boat going to Mumbai. Shah tracked and guided the attackers via GPS as they sailed towards Mumbai.

On 24 November, Shah arrived at Malir Town in Karachi, where he established a digital control room with help from Indian terrorist Abu Jundal. (Note: This control room was set up at the office of a person called Abu Yakoob, as instructed by Lashkar-e-Taiba chief Hafiz Saeed. It was located in the Quaidabad area of Karachi, somewhere between Malir Cantonment and Jinnah International Airport. According to Abu Jundal's testimony, the control room was located 1.5 kilometres (0.93 mi) away from Quaidabad. The homes of many prominent personalities and Pakistan army officers were located in the area, and many handlers arrived at the control room in their own vehicles. According to Abu Jundal, this control room was destroyed after Zakiur Rehman Lakhvi's arrest in December 2008.) This room was used by Shah and other LeT commanders to guide the attackers. On 25 November, Abu Jundal checked if the VoIP system was working, while commanders Shah, Lakhvi and Sajid Mir waited for news updates on the attacks. On 26 November, the day of the attack, Shah wrote a press release claiming responsibility for the attack by the fake Hyderabad based group Deccan Mujahideen, (Note: This fake email claiming responsibility for the attacks was drafted by Abu Jundal.) and began to circulate it through his network. (Note: Shah used two email addresses for this purpose, one based in Pakistan and created on 24 June 2008, and another created on 26 November 2008 using a Russian proxy server.) Before the attacks began, Shah looked up images of the Oberoi Hotel, and Wikimapia maps of Taj Mahal Palace Hotel and Nariman House (also known as Chabad House).

=== Execution ===
Shah and other LeT members in the control room fasted throughout the day, and broke their fasts just before they started watching live news on the attack. Shah and the other handlers were constantly in touch with the ten attackers through cell phones, the VoIP system and Thuraya satellite phones. Upon entering CSMT, Kasab thought the crowd there was fewer than what he had seen in the CD shown by Shah. They tried to contact their handlers, but could not get through because of low network coverage.

The other handlers at the control room were reportedly Abu Jundal, Major General, Kafa, Wassi, (Note: Wassi is reportedly the alias of Sajid Mir of the Lashkar-e-Taiba.) and Buzurg. (Note: Buzurg is reportedly the alias of Syed Salahuddin of the Hizbul Mujahideen.) According to a US military intelligence official quoted by Bill Roggio, the Major General mentioned here was Hamid Gul. According to the call recordings analyzed by Indian authorities, all the handlers except Kafa talked to the attackers at Nariman House. However, only Kafa, Wassi and Shah talked to the attackers at the Oberoi Hotel; and only Wassi talked to the attackers at the Taj Mahal Palace. After attackers Fahadullah and Abdul Rehman killed their non-Muslim hostages at the tenth/eleventh floor of the Oberoi Hotel on 27 November, Shah told Fahadullah to search for routes to the lower floors. When National Security Guard commandos were para-dropped at Nariman House on 28 November, Shah started looking for news updates, searching for terms like Jew, Israeli and Chabad.

=== Aftermath ===
Officials of the Intelligence Bureau, India's internal security agency, claimed they were not monitoring Shah's online movements as reported by the ProPublica and Frontline investigation. They said Shah's laptop activity and the naval route he mapped were shared by the GCHQ only after the attacks began. Before the attacks, GCHQ believed the intelligence they had was not detailed enough to be shared with Indian agencies. British, Indian and American agencies did not share their information with each other before the attack. After the attack began, the agencies started collating their data to establish the planning and timeline of the attack. Shivshankar Menon, the Indian foreign minister at the time, said the data was available but the analysis was lacking. Menon said the monitoring of Shah showed the limitations of signals intelligence without proper analysis.

Investigations of Shah's computer and email accounts revealed a list of 320 locations worldwide deemed as possible targets for terrorist attacks similar to the Mumbai attacks. Only 20 of the targets were locations in India. Analysts believed the list was a statement of intent rather than a list of locations where LeT cells were established and ready to attack. Shah was researching targets in Kashmir, Punjab, India, New Delhi, and Afghanistan, as well as United States Army bases in Germany and Canada. M. K. Narayanan, then the Indian National Security Advisor, asked American officials to provide Shah's list of potential targets. In 2014, the New York Times released a redacted National Security Agency document, which revealed Shah had researched multiple locations like the Gateway of India, other tourist sites, dams, power plants, and potential landing areas for the attackers' boats.

On 2 February 2009, in an interview with Karan Thapar on the CNN-IBN channel, Narayanan said Shah and Lakhvi were practically under house arrest and were not actually imprisoned. On 29 July 2009, Manmohan Singh, the Prime Minister of India at the time, said the Pakistani Federal Investigation Agency (FIA) had sent a dossier with details of its investigation. According to Singh, the dossier said Pakistan had extensive proof confirming the LeT carried out the attack. The dossier further detailed the charges filed against Shah and Lakhvi under the Anti-Terrorism Act 1997. Shah and Lakhvi were also charged with mass murder, abetment to murder, misuse of encryption and cyberterrorism. Analyst Prem Mahadevan argues Shah's arrest was allowed because the LeT's cybersecurity and communications were compromised under his watch. Mahadevan postulates Shah was "burned" to avoid blowing the cover of the ISI agents involved.

In March 2009, Shah, Lakhvi and Yousuf Muzzamil Bhat, all imprisoned at the time, were replaced as LeT commanders in Kashmir by Abu Anas, Hyder Bhayee, Huzefa (Abdul Ghaffar) and Walid. Also in March 2009, Shah's involvement and his real name were uncovered after a joint effort by the Federal Bureau of Investigation (FBI) and Indian agencies. They recorded Shah's voice from the VoIP calls, and questioned LeT terrorists imprisoned in India and elsewhere about his identity. Kasab confirmed Shah's identity, however, he was not aware Shah's real name was Abdul Wajid. The FBI also wanted to interrogate Shah's co-accused Mazhar Iqbal, also known by his alias Abu Alqama.

On 26 August 2009, Interpol issued red corner notices for Saeed and Lakhvi. India also appealed for notices against Shah and Alqama after providing the evidence against them, Interpol said it was still examining this evidence. The red corner notices were issued after the Indian Central Bureau of Investigation submitted non-bailable warrants approved by investigating judge M. L. Tahaliyani on 23 June.

In December 2009, Indian authorities requested the FIA to send photographs and voice samples of Wajid/Shah so they could comprehensively confirm his identity. However, the FIA did not respond. The FBI wanted to interrogate Shah about any Pakistani officials or government organizations who helped them execute the attacks, among other things. According to Indian think tank Observer Research Foundation, Brigadier Riaz Chibb of the ISI regularly communicated with Shah and other LeT commanders. After the 2008 bombing of the Indian embassy in Kabul, India received intercepted calls between the attack's planners and ISI officials, provided by US agencies. Some numbers the Mumbai attackers called belonged to these officials, according to Indian journalist Prem Shankar Jha. Also, Shah was in touch with the ISI even after the LeT was officially banned in Pakistan. Sajjad Ahmed, an LeT militant captured in Rafiabad in Kashmir, claimed Lakhvi and Shah were the most prominent commanders at LeT training camps.

The FBI evidence named "A", a LeT commander the Pakistani government knew about, who had significant powers in the LeT. According to a Times of India journalist, "A" was actually Zarrar Shah. As of 2016, seven years after the attacks, Indian authorities were still waiting for the complete records GCHQ and other Five Eyes agencies had on Shah. Indian officials said GCHQ probably had access to all of Shah's emails, and the technology to record all the conversations in the Karachi control room. Western agencies also probably accessed all devices linked to the VoIP system. Indian officials said Western agencies did not share this information to avoid incriminating the ISI and damaging their relations. As of 2014, according to journalist Sebastian Rotella, Shah and other LeT commanders were able to execute acts of terror from their jail cells. According to former American intelligence agents, they had a control room in Adiala Jail similar to the one they had in Karachi.

=== Claims of fake persona ===
According to Indian journalist Praveen Swami, many Indian officials believe Zarrar Shah is just another alias of Sajid Mir. Swami says Abdul Wajid might be a junior Lashkar member who was arrested and said to be Zarrar Shah, because the FBI was denied approval to interrogate him. However, the FBI was also refused access to Lakhvi and Mazhar Iqbal. Swami says voice samples and photographs of Wajid were not sent to Indian authorities because this would confirm Wajid was not the person behind the Shah alias. However, voice samples and pictures of Lakhvi and Mazhar Iqbal were also not provided.

== Trial ==
On 10 December 2008, Pakistan announced the arrest of Shah for his role in the Mumbai attacks. Shah was one among ten to twenty LeT militants arrested during raids in PaK. Shah and Lakhvi were reportedly arrested from an LeT camp near the PaK capital of Muzaffarabad. Admiral Michael Mullen, the US Chairman of the Joint Chiefs of Staff, praised the raid and arrests, saying they were initial steps towards peace in the region. On 31 December 2008, Pakistan announced Shah's confession of LeT's involvement and his own central role in the attack. According to Pakistani officials, Shah's interrogation confirmed most of the details obtained from Ajmal Kasab, the only captured attacker. However, Farhatullah Babar (spokesperson for President Asif Ali Zardari) and Sherry Rehman (Pakistan's Information Minister) said they were not aware of any such confessions. Shah was among 35 LeT operatives wanted by the Mumbai Police for planning and facilitating the attack between December 2007 and November 2008. Voice recordings of Shah, Lakhvi and three others were taken from the calls they had with the attackers. However, these recordings were not admissible in Indian courts as they could not be attributed to official sources.

In January 2009, the FBI sent its evidence to Pakistan, including the call transcripts of Shah, Lakhvi and the attackers; and the fake email claiming responsibility for the attack sent by Shah. As of February 2009, the FBI hadn't received Pakistan's approval to interrogate Shah and Lakhvi, according to David C. Mulford, the US Ambassador to India. There were also reports about the ISI refusing to hand over Shah and Lakhvi to the FIA. On 12 February, Rehman Malik, interior adviser to the prime minister, said Shah was still in custody and allegedly wrote the emails claiming responsibility for the attacks. Malik also refused Indian demands for the extradition of Shah and Lakhvi, and said they would be tried only in Pakistan. The government prepared for the trial to be held on camera, and checked its anti-terror statutes for potential amendments, as there were no provisions for prosecuting acts of terror executed outside Pakistan.

On 15 February 2009, Shah was remanded to FIA custody by Anti-Terrorism Court (ATC) judge Sakhi Muhammad Kahut. Shah was to be held in FIA custody till 3 March. On 4 March, Kahut extended his remand by two weeks. On 7 March, the FIA told the interior ministry it might have to stop the investigation because India and other countries were not sending the required evidence. On 19 March, Kahut extended the remand by 14 days, as the accused were scheduled to see the CD footage of the attack sent by India. On 14 April, Kahut remanded Shah, Lakhvi and two others to two weeks custody till 28 April, as the FIA hadn't finished its charge sheet till then. On 28 April, an interim charge sheet was filed.

On 12 May, the ATC granted the FIA more time to submit the final charges against Shah and the other accused. The same day, the US Embassy in Islamabad sent a cable to the US Secretary of State which was published by WikiLeaks. The embassy appreciated the FIA's investigation and the strong case it had, but said the agency did not have enough evidence to convict the five accused. The embassy said such evidence was not shared by India, and in cases where evidence was shared, it was never judicially certified and usually of low quality. The FIA needed either the call recordings of the LeT handlers, "or a sworn testimony by suspects in Indian custody regarding the recordings". The FBI also could not share the evidence without Indian authorization. The embassy officials lamented the possibility of the LeT handlers' acquittal because of a lack of evidence.

Also on 12 May 2009, Anne W. Patterson, the US Ambassador to Pakistan at the time, sent a diplomatic cable which said the evidence India was sending to Pakistan was not judicially certified. Patterson said Pakistan would have to acquit Shah and Lakhvi because of this issue. On 6 June, the presiding judge adjourned the trial of Shah and others till 20 June. In July, the FIA submitted its report to the ATC with details of all the accused including Shah. On 18 July, the updated charges were filed. In August, presiding judge Baqir Ali Rana banned media coverage of the trial. On 5 September, Rana adjourned the case till 19 September. Rana reportedly received death threats from the LeT due to his role in the trial. He asked to be recused from the case, and was replaced by Malik Muhammad Akram Awan in October 2009.

Shah and the four other accused were tried on camera at Adiala Jail in Rawalpindi to maintain secrecy. Their lawyers were told to not talk about the case. Pakistani newspaper Dawn News claimed the trial was held on camera to ensure the safety of the judge, lawyers and witnesses. On 25 November 2009, all the accused pleaded not guilty when the charges against them were filed. Their trial was scheduled to begin on 5 December. The charge sheet stated Shah and Mazhar Iqbal ordered the attackers to murder as many people as they could. Defence lawyer Rajput said he could not estimate when the case would conclude, because the ATC was trying many other cases at the time. From May 2009 to May 2010, the court conducted more than ten hearings. According to Rajput, the charges levied against the five accused were not comprehensive, which would prolong the case.

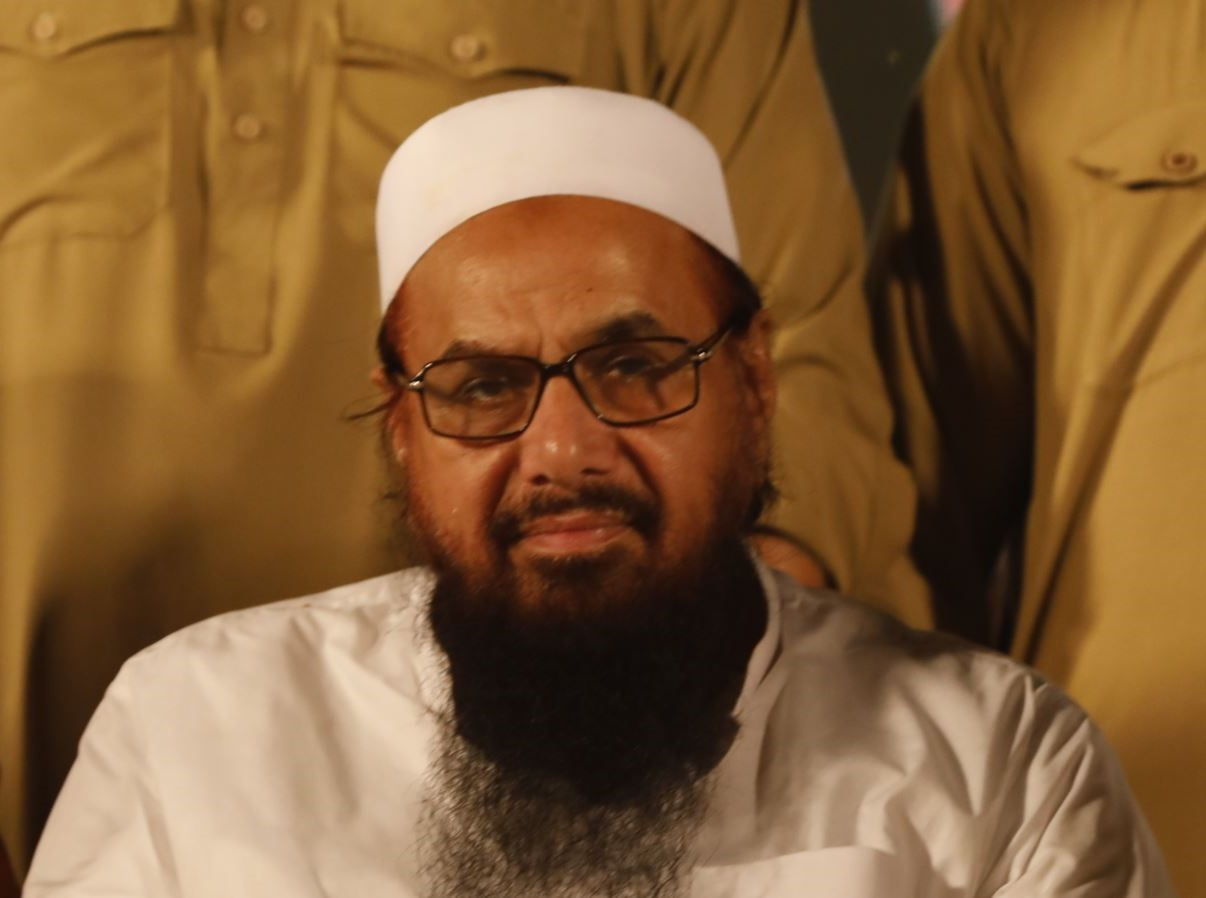
Lashkar-e-Taiba chief and founder Hafiz Saeed

On 27 January 2010, Pakistani prosecutors said the evidence they had was enough to prosecute Shah, Lakhvi and five other accused. However, on 25 April, Pakistani officials suggested the trial of these seven could not conclude till India extradited Kasab to Pakistan as a witness. The prosecution's motion for permitting Indian witnesses to appear through video conferencing was scheduled on 18 September 2010. Defense lawyers protested the motion, saying it was not approved under Pakistani law at the time. On 24 December 2010, India suggested a commission visit Pakistan to question Shah and Lakhvi and get their voice samples.

On 13 September 2012, judges Hameedur Rahman and Noorul Haq Qureshi of the Islamabad High Court rejected the FIA's plea to record voice samples of Shah, Lakhvi and five other accused. On 11 November 2012, during an ATC hearing, Crime Investigation Department (CID) officials said Shah, Lakhvi and three others trained the Mumbai attackers at Yousaf Goth in Karachi's Gadap Town, and Mirpur Sakro in Thatta. The hearing was adjourned to 17 November. At the same time, the FIA asked the ATC to conduct daily hearings, and the Pakistani administration suggested amendments to the evidence law, removing the compulsory consent required for obtaining voice recordings from accused persons.

In May 2013, Chaudhry Zulfikar Ali, the FIA public prosecutor in the case, was assassinated in Pakistan's capital Islamabad. In April 2018, Chaudhry Azhar, the FIA prosecution chief in the case since 2009, was removed from the case and told to stop investigating it further. By then, the ATC had heard all the Pakistani witnesses, and said the case could not proceed until 24 Indian witnesses gave their statements in Pakistan. From 2008 to 2017, over a period of nine years, the presiding judges were changed nine times, and thus the case stalled indefinitely. In 2015, the Islamabad High Court ordered the case be concluded in two months. In April that year, Lakhvi was freed on bail while the other six accused remained in custody at Adiala Jail.

By January 2016, the ATC had heard 68 prosecution witnesses. The testimony of the last two witnesses was scheduled for May 2018, (Note: These two witnesses whose testimonies were pending were Federal Investigation Agency officials Wajid Zia and Zahid Akhter.) when the ATC resumed the case after Prime Minister Nawaz Sharif said 26/11 was probably executed by Pakistani terrorists, and the trial was delayed because of civilian-army intervention. Shahrukh Arjumand was the presiding judge, and he ordered the FIA to ascertain whether the 27 Indian witnesses in the case were willing to testify. The FIA hadn't informed the ATC about the position of the Indian witnesses since January 2016.

== Sources ==
=== Books ===
- Basrur, Rajesh; Hoyt, Timothy; Hussain, Rifaat; Mandal, Sujoyini (2009). The 2008 Mumbai Terrorist Attacks: Strategic Fallout (PDF). Singapore: S. Rajaratnam School of International Studies. ISBN 9789810846848. JSTOR resrep05887. Archived (PDF) from the original on 26 March 2025.
- Bhasin, Avtar Singh (2010). India's Foreign Relations – 2009: Documents (PDF). New Delhi: Geetika Publishers; Ministry of External Affairs. ISBN 9788190315081. Archived (PDF) from the original on 8 June 2023.
- Farina, Major Joseph I. (2019). "Cyberspace in the Megacity: Thickening the Fog of War?". In Jensen, Benjamin M.; Breitenbauch, Henrik; Valeriano, Brandon (eds.). Complex Terrain: Megacities and the Changing Character of Urban Operations (PDF). Quantico, Virginia: Marine Corps University. doi:10.56686/9780160954344. ISBN 9780160954344. Archived (PDF) from the original on 27 May 2025.
- Levy, Adrian; Scott-Clark, Cathy (2013). The Siege: The Attack On The Taj. New Delhi: Penguin Books. ISBN 9780143420101.
- Reich, Pauline C.; Gelbstein, Eduardo (2012). Law, Policy, and Technology: Cyberterrorism, Information Warfare, and Internet Immobilization. Hershey, Pennsylvania: IGI Global. ISBN 9781615208319.
- Rodrigues, Rommel (2010). Kasab: The Face of 26/11. New Delhi: Penguin Books. ISBN 9780143415473.

=== Government documents ===
- "Case FIR No. 01/2009 Dated 12.02.2009" (PDF). South Asia Terrorism Portal. Archived (PDF) from the original on 30 June 2025.
- The State of Maharashtra v. Mohammed Ajmal Mohammad Amir Kasab (Mumbai HC 21 February 2011), Text, archived from the original on 24 May 2024.
- "Mumbai Terrorist Attacks (Nov. 26–29) | Indian Dossier, Annexure 1" (PDF). The Hindu. Archived from the original (PDF) on 17 January 2009.
- "Mumbai Terrorist Attacks (Nov. 26–29) | Indian Dossier, Annexure VII" (PDF). The Hindu. Archived from the original (PDF) on 17 January 2009.

=== Research reports ===
- Glanz, James; Rotella, Sebastian; Sanger, David E. (21 December 2014). "In 2008 Mumbai Attacks, Piles of Spy Data, but an Uncompleted Puzzle". PBS Frontline. Archived from the original on 14 October 2023.
- John, Wilson (April 2009). "Military-militant nexus in Pakistan and implications for peace with India" (PDF). ORF Issue Brief. 17. Observer Research Foundation: 4–5. Archived (PDF) from the original on 6 September 2025.
- Mahadevan, Prem (January 2019). An Inconvenient Reality: 26/11 as State-Sponsored Terrorism (PDF) (Report). Vivekananda International Foundation. Archived (PDF) from the original on 31 March 2022.
- Mahadevan, Prem (27 June 2019). "A Decade on from the 2008 Mumbai Attack: Reviewing the question of state-sponsorship". International Centre for Counter-Terrorism. Archived from the original on 28 September 2025.
- Peevey, Anna Belle; Sanger, David E.; Glanz, James; Larson, Jeff; Rotella, Sebastian; Jennings, Tom (2014). "Web of Terror | MIT Docubase". MIT Docubase. Archived from the original on 18 June 2025.
- Roul, Animesh (4 March 2009). "Lashkar-e-Taiba Resumes Operations Against Indian Forces in Jammu and Kashmir". Jamestown Foundation. Archived from the original on 18 December 2025.
- "Incidents involving Lashkar-e-Taiba: 2010". South Asia Terrorism Portal. Archived from the original on 22 May 2025.

=== News articles (in English) ===
- Ali, Ahmed (3 September 2012). "Pak control room set up 3 days before 26/11". The Times of India. Archived from the original on 19 June 2024.
- Almeida, Cyril (12 May 2018). "For Nawaz, it's not over till it's over". Dawn. Archived from the original on 27 April 2025.
- Asad, Malik (19 December 2014). "Court grants bail to Mumbai attack mastermind". Dawn. Archived from the original on 26 March 2015.
- "Pakistan admits India attack link". BBC News. 12 February 2009. Archived from the original on 16 April 2025.
- Chauhan, Neeraj (28 June 2012). "With sacred threads, Abu Jundal tried to colour 26/11 saffron". The Times of India. Archived from the original on 6 December 2024.
- "Pakistan PM confirms Mumbai arrests". CNN. 10 December 2008. Archived from the original on 25 October 2022.
- '"Mumbai attack suspects sent to jail on remand". Dawn. 20 March 2009. Archived from the original on 19 December 2025.
- "Remand of suspect in Mumbai attack case extended". Dawn. 15 April 2009. Archived from the original on 17 December 2025.
- "Mumbai attacks: FIA petitions dismissed". Dawn. 13 September 2012.
- Farooqi, Asif (16 February 2009). "ممبئی حملے ملزمان، کون کون ؟" [Mumbai attacks suspects, who are they?]. BBC Urdu (in Urdu). Archived from the original on 1 January 2026.
- "Third Mumbai Terrorist Suspect Placed Under House Arrest; Charity a Front Group For Terrorist Organization". Fox News. 10 December 2008. Archived from the original on 27 January 2025.
- Hafeez, Mateen (3 February 2009). "No voice samples of Kasab handlers". The Times of India. Archived from the original on 23 March 2021.
- Haider, Kamran (12 February 2009). "Pakistan says it arrests Mumbai attack plotters". Reuters. Archived from the original on 11 April 2025.
- "Pakistan completes Mumbai terror attack probe: report". Hindustan Times. Indo-Asian News Service. 29 January 2009. Archived from the original on 31 December 2025.
- Hussain, Zahid; Rosenberg, Matthew; Wonacott, Peter (31 December 2008). "Pakistan's Probe Finds Local Links To Attacks On Mumbai". Wall Street Journal. Archived from the original on 27 January 2025.
- Imran, Mohammad (16 May 2018). "ATC summons last 2 Pakistani witnesses in Mumbai attacks case". Dawn. Archived from the original on 14 May 2025.
- "Pak rejects WSJ report on Zarar Shah confession". India Today. Press Trust of India. 2 January 2009. Archived from the original on 31 December 2025.
- "Gujarat riots spurred Abu Jundal to join LeT to take revenge on India". India Today. Indo-Asian News Service. 13 July 2012.
- "Captured terrorist Sajjad nails Lakhvi, Zarar". India Today. 2 September 2015. Archived from the original on 31 December 2025.
- Jaffry, Nasir (4 May 2010). "First step over here but Pak unsure". The Telegraph India. Archived from the original on 17 December 2025.
- Jha, Prem Shankar (24 January 2009). "The Lashkar And The ISI: 26/11 was a Pakistani Army plan to force India to retaliate". New Age Islam. Archived from the original on 24 June 2021.
- Khan, Omar Farooq (12 November 2012). "Lashkar-e-Taiba trained 26/11 Mumbai terror attackers: Pakistani investigators". The Times of India. Archived from the original on 18 July 2014.
- Khan, Omar Farooq (30 April 2018). "Pakistan sacks 26/11 prosecutor for not taking government line". The Times of India. Archived from the original on 23 November 2024.
- Khan, Omar Farooq (16 May 2018). "26/11 attacks hearing resumed in Pakistan after Nawaz Sharif's admission". The Times of India. Archived from the original on 18 December 2025.
- Khan, Zarar (10 December 2008). "Pakistan detains 2nd alleged Mumbai plotter". AP. Archived from the original on 14 December 2008.
- Laskar, Rezaul Hasan (7 March 2009). "Pakistan may stop probing Mumbai terror attack". Rediff. Archived from the original on 18 November 2011.
- Laskar, Rezaul Hasan; Zulqernain, M. (24 October 2009). "Pak appoints new judge for 26/11 trial". Hindustan Times. Archived from the original on 17 December 2025.
- Malik, Surabhi; Sanyal, Prasad (28 June 2012). "This Article is From Jun 28, 2012ISI destroyed 26/11 control room in Karachi after Zaki-ur Rehman Lakhvi's arrest: Abu Jundal". NDTV. Archived from the original on 7 May 2025.
- Masood, Salman (12 February 2009). "Pakistan Announces Arrests for Mumbai Attacks". New York Times. Archived from the original on 20 November 2024.
- "Lakhvi, other suspects remanded in FIA custody". Mumbai Mirror. Press Trust of India. 15 February 2009. Archived from the original on 17 December 2025.
- "WikiLeaks: Hillary Clinton told Pak to prevent LeT attack on India". NDTV.com. 19 May 2011. Archived from the original on 25 August 2019.
- Nelson, Dean (12 November 2012). "Pakistan details how Lashkar-e-Taiba 2008 Mumbai attack gunmen were trained". The Telegraph. Archived from the original on 10 July 2025.
- Oppel Jr., Richard A.; Masood, Salman (31 December 2008). "Pakistani Militants Admit Role in Siege, Official Says". The New York Times. Archived from the original on 8 October 2025.
- Qarar, Shakeel (13 May 2018). "Indian govt biggest obstacle in Mumbai attacks trial, says Nisar following Nawaz's question". Dawn. Archived from the original on 13 June 2025.
- Rajput, Rashmi (30 January 2010). "26/11 handler had gone under scalpel to change look". The Indian Express. Archived from the original on 10 July 2023.
- Ramesh, Randeep (19 February 2009). "Mumbai attackers had hit list of 320 world targets". The Guardian. Archived from the original on 22 July 2025.
- Ranjan, Amitav (27 July 2012). "Four laptops, two TV sets, full house in Lashkar control room". The Indian Express.
- "26/11: Lakhvi, other suspects' remand extended". Rediff.com. Press Trust of India. 4 March 2009. Archived from the original on 9 December 2024.
- "Interpol issues notice against Hafiz Saeed, Lakhvi". Rediff.com. Press Trust of India. 26 August 2009. Archived from the original on 22 December 2025.
- "Pak may send officials to India to quiz 26/11 witnesses". Rediff.com. Press Trust of India. 29 August 2010. Archived from the original on 31 December 2025.
- "Pakistan holds Mumbai conspirators' trial in secrecy". Reuters. 29 August 2009.
- Roggio, Bill (10 December 2008). "Pakistan detains Lashkar-e-Taiba communications expert". FDD's Long War Journal. Archived from the original on 14 July 2025.
- Roggio, Bill (7 January 2009). "Mumbai handlers in Pakistan cheer after ordering murders over phone". FDD's Long War Journal. Archived from the original on 5 September 2025.
- Rotella, Sebastian (21 April 2015). "The Hidden Intelligence Breakdowns Behind the Mumbai Attacks". ProPublica. Archived from the original on 7 September 2025.
- Samanta, Pranab Dhal (6 July 2010). "GPS records, CD transcript matches boost India's case". The Indian Express.
- Schmitt, Eric P.; Mazzetti, Mark; Perlez, Jane (7 December 2008). "Pakistan's Spies Aided Group Tied to Mumbai Siege". New York Times. Archived from the original on 3 July 2024.
- Sharma, Aman (23 December 2014). "India did not track Zarar Shah's computer before 26/11: Intelligence Bureau". The Economic Times. Archived from the original on 17 December 2025.
- Singh, Vijay V. (17 November 2009). "Headley probe: Links with Kasab & Co now NIA focus". The Times of India. Archived from the original on 20 November 2009.
- Srivathsan, A. (19 May 2011). "'If Mumbai attack suspects in Pakistan are freed, India is at fault'". The Hindu. Archived from the original on 16 May 2022.
- Subramanian, Nirupama (6 September 2009). "Lawyer in Mumbai attacks case objects to secrecy order". The Hindu. Archived from the original on 17 December 2025.
- Swami, Praveen (22 November 2009). "26/11 investigation led to brick wall in Pakistan". The Hindu. Archived from the original on 9 November 2020.
- Swami, Praveen (10 December 2009). "Missing links in Pakistan's 26/11 probe stoke suspicions". The Hindu. Archived from the original on 17 December 2025.
- Swami, Praveen (19 February 2016). "26/11: 7 years on, India waits for West intelligence on 'ISI links'". The Indian Express. Archived from the original on 1 April 2022.
- "Interpol issues Red Corner notice against Saeed, Lakhvi". The Hindu. Press Trust of India. 26 August 2009. Archived from the original on 22 December 2025.
- "Pakistan indicts Lakhvi, six others". The Hindu. 25 November 2009. Archived from the original on 15 December 2025.
- "206598: Mumbai prosecution update: Pakistan lacks evidence to convict top suspects". The Hindu. 19 May 2011. Archived from the original on 17 December 2025.
- "26/11 probe: FBI wants to quiz Zarar Shah and Al Qama". The Indian Express. 5 March 2009. Archived from the original on 15 December 2025.
- "Mumbai suspects to be shown CDs given by India". The New Indian Express. 19 March 2009. Archived from the original on 17 December 2025.
- "Arrest warrant issued against Baloch man". The New Indian Express. 6 June 2009. Archived from the original on 17 December 2025.
- "Pakistan bans coverage of 26/11 trial". The New Indian Express. 29 August 2009. Archived from the original on 17 December 2025.
- "Interpol issues notices against Saeed, Lakhvi". The New Indian Express. 15 May 2012. Archived from the original on 22 December 2025.
- "Top-Secret N.S.A. Document". The New York Times. 21 December 2014.
- "FBI set to present proof to Islamabad". The Times of India. 2 January 2009. Archived from the original on 18 December 2025.
- "Pakistan yet to allow FBI access to detained Mumbai suspects: Mulford". The Times of India. 24 February 2009. Archived from the original on 25 September 2022.
- Walsh, Declan (3 May 2013). "Prosecutor in Bhutto's Death and Mumbai Attacks Is Killed in Pakistan". The New York Times. Archived from the original on 27 September 2024.
