= Phantom (2015 film) =

2015 Indian film by Kabir Khan

- Theatrical release poster
- Directed by: Kabir Khan
- Written by: Kabir Khan; Parveez Shaikh
- Dialogues by: Kabir Khan; Kausar Munir
- Based on: Mumbai Avengers by Hussain Zaidi
- Produced by: Sajid Nadiadwala; Siddharth Roy Kapur
- Starring: Saif Ali Khan; Katrina Kaif
- Cinematography: Aseem Mishra
- Edited by: Aarif Sheikh
- Music by: Songs: Pritam; Score: Julius Packiam
- Production companies: UTV Motion Pictures; Nadiadwala Grandson Entertainment
- Distributed by: UTV Motion Pictures
- Release date: 28 August 2015
- Running time: 135 minutes
- Country: India
- Language: Hindi
- Budget: ₹72 crore
- Box office: ₹84 crore

Phantom is a 2015 Indian Hindi-language spy action thriller film directed by Kabir Khan and produced by Sajid Nadiadwala and Siddharth Roy Kapur. The film stars Saif Ali Khan and Katrina Kaif in leading roles. The screenplay of the film was written in coordination with author Hussain Zaidi's book Mumbai Avengers on the aftermath of 26/11 Mumbai attacks. The film was released worldwide on 28 August 2015 to mixed reviews from critics.

== Plot ==
The story opens with a narration of Mumbai and the assault it suffered across the world at the hands of the perpetrators of the 26/11 terror attacks.

Sometime in present day, a car chase in Chicago leads to a scuffle between a man ostensibly named Jude Rosario and an American male known as Matthew Brody. The scuffle ends with Brody falling into the icy waters of Chicago River, and his body missing. This results in Rosario being arrested and convicted of murder.

A flashback to six months prior shows the office of the Indian RAW chief Roy, where he and his trusted men plan a daring covert operation. The man, known as Jude Rosario in the opening sequence, is shown to be Captain Daniyal Khan, a dead-end ex-soldier with a completely deadpan sense of life and death which is pulled out of oblivion and pressed into service by the spy agency to wreak vengeance on the men who planned the 26/11 Mumbai terror attacks. He agrees on the assurance that he will be reinstated in the Indian army to the same rank from which he was court-martialled, which meant regaining the respect of his estranged father, retd. Col. Usman Khan, and mentee, Dilawar Singh. His only team member, Nawaz Mistry helps him find his first target Sajid Mir at a cricket match in London. On reaffirming his identity after breaking into his apartment, Daniyal rigs up an explosion which kills Sajid, which makes the headlines explaining it was accidental, resulting in an investigation by the Pakistani ISI.

Back in the present day, Daniyal, a.k.a. Jude, has landed in the same jail as David Headley, his next target. He contacts Nawaz in order to acquire money to buy a battery, as a replacement for another one which holds a certain poison. The poison, succinylcholine, is untraceable as it can kill a person when it touches the tongue, causing a heart attack. After killing Headley by plugging the poisonous battery into a showerhead he usually uses, Daniyal learns that Brody, who supposedly died upon falling in the river, is found alive, and Daniyal is released as his earlier sentence is rendered null and void; Brody is revealed to have been on Daniyal's payroll. Meanwhile, ISI agents gather information about Daniyal.

He and Nawaz travel to Syria via Lebanon, to get in touch with the fighters of Lashkar-e-Taiba. There, Daniyal is held captive by the L-e-T and is forced into revealing the purpose of killing Sajid Mir and David Headley, on camera. The chief of L-e-T in Syria tries his best to send the video of Daniyal's confession to ISI, but the war-torn situation of Syria has led to a mass disruption of communication networks. Nawaz, with her team of soldiers, kills the subordinates of L-e-T, much to the chagrin of Daniyal. Subsequently, Daniyal, Nawaz, and the team escape from the clutches of the L-e-T after a bloody gunfight. Daniyal manages to kill the Syrian chief of L-e-T, just before he is about to send the video to the ISI, and destroys the recordings. Frustrated after an agent discovers Brody and learns of the ploy, the ISI kills the Indian Consulate General of Jordan, Mr. Rajan Sampath, in a gas explosion, similar to the killing of Sajid Mir, as a revenge attack. The RAW chief Roy reprimands Daniyal for unnecessarily killing someone who was not meant to be killed and asks him to call off the mission. Nawaz encourages Daniyal to carry on the mission to avenge the 2008 Mumbai Attacks by killing the direct people who orchestrated the whole mission. She offers to take him and herself to Pakistan.

Daniyal and Nawaz go to Pakistan to take down the last two perpetrators, Sahabuddin Umvi and Haaris Saeed. There, they make plans of killing Saeed with the help of a local restaurant owner and RAW agent Khalid, by an explosive planted in the mic used during his public rally. However, their plan fails, leading Daniyal to pursue Saeed in a car and shoot him dead, also causing an explosion. Umvi is killed with the help of a nurse Amina Bi, a mother who lost her militant son in a suicide attack, who replaces his regular medicine with poison, later shooting herself after the police find her at her home.

With the Pakistani army and ISI pursuing them, Daniyal and Nawaz make their way to the coast to escape through the Arabian Sea. Their accomplices get caught and interrogated for information or are killed. While they are escaping on a boat, the Pakistani military finds out about it and sends patrol boats to apprehend them. While hiding in the waters with Nawaz, Daniyal gets shot by the military and dies. Nawaz later gets rescued by the Indian Navy, after they leave. Later, she goes to the Taj Hotel in Mumbai, where she meets a tea seller who was giving tea for free as his son, who was a waiter in the hotel and was killed by the terrorists in attacks, has now been avenged as Daniyal killed them. She buys two cups of tea from him, fulfilling a promise earlier made to Daniyal.

== Cast ==
- Saif Ali Khan as Captain Daniyal Khan / Jude Rosario
- Katrina Kaif as Nawaz Mistry, a former R&AW Agent
- Mohammed Zeeshan Ayyub as Samit Mishra, a R&AW officer
- Rajesh Tailang as Alok, a R&AW officer
- Sabyasachi Chakrabarty as Roy, Chief of R&AW
- Middat Khan as Khalid Hussain
- Sohaila Kapur as Amina Bi
- Shahnawaz Pradhan as Haaris Saeed
- J. Brandon Hill as David Coleman Headley
- Mir Sarwar as Sajid Mir
- Sunil Nagar as Sabahuddin Umvi
- Kaizaad Kotwal as Pakistan Ambassador Shehriyar Baig
- Tushar Pandey as Ashraf Ali, Amina Bi's assistant
- Mukul Nag as Qureshi
- Yaad Grewal as a man in Sajid Mir's flat
- Mahabanoo Mody Kotwal as Mehrun Khan, Daniyal's mother
- Denzil Smith as ISI Chief Haider
- Ashwath Bhatt as ISI agent Firoz
- Pooran Kiri as ISI agent Javed
- Prashant Kumar as Moosa
- Sumit Gulati as Shehzad
- Anoop Gautam as Pakistani Commando Noor Mohammad
- Mohan Maharishi as the National Security Advisor of India
- Hemant Mahaur as Pakistani boatman
- Rajiv Gupta as Indian Naval officer
- Qazi Touqeer in a special appearance in the song "Afghan Jalebi"

== Production ==
=== Development ===
Kabir Khan and author S. Hussain Zaidi had come together to collaborate on Kabir's then untitled film, based on the scenario post-26/11 Mumbai attacks with Saif Ali Khan and Katrina Kaif signed in leading roles. The screenplay of the film is an adaptation and is co-written in conjunction with Hussain's then-unreleased book. The film earlier had a working title as Daniyal Khan, before being titled Phantom. Saif Ali Khan and Kaif have reportedly learnt Kurdish and Arabic for their roles. The plot of the film weaves a fictional story to kill the perpetrators of 2008 Mumbai attacks- Sajid Mir, David Coleman Headley, Zakiur Rehman Lakhvi (named as Sabahuddin Umvi) and Hafiz Saeed (named as Haaris Saeed). The film also depicts incidents similar to the Assassination of Mahmoud Al-Mabhouh and Boston Marathon bombing. Kashmiri Sufi singer Qazi Touqeer featured in the Afghan Jalebi song.

Phantom marks Saif Ali Khan's only film to be a billed UTV Motion Pictures production, with Siddharth Roy Kapur attached as producer; despite several of his previous films such as Race (2008), Kurbaan (2009) and Race 2 being distributed by the company, he had never formally worked on any of their productions. It is also Kaif's second of three films to be produced by UTV, the first being Tees Maar Khan (2010) and the third being Fitoor (2016), while her fourth and final collaboration with Kapur came with the Disney–produced musical Jagga Jasoos (2017), which UTV distributed.

=== Filming ===
Filming began in October 2013 in Beirut, Lebanon. Around 10% of the film was shot in Lebanon in areas including downtown Beirut, the populous area of Khandaq al-Ghameeq, and the mountainous areas of Kfardebian, with the latter two representing Syria. The shoot of the film required a recreation of a Syrian refugee camp, which involved almost 400 locals in acting as rebel militias. The sets of the film were so realistic that many people in the area believed actual militia groups had set up camp, and the Lebanese army began circling planes over the set. However, the confusion was cleared after the first day. Due to the country's recent political turmoil, security was provided to the crew. In January 2014, action sequences were shot in Kashmir near Pahalgam hill station and in a ski resort in Gulmarg for five days. The scenes involved a blast sequence in the peak of winter, when the entire valley was covered in a 10-foot blanket of snow. In March 2014, filming continued in a small town in Malerkotla, Punjab where the area was recreated to resemble a Pakistani marketplace. The entire area was dressed up to look authentic, complete with Urdu hoarding, posters, and flags. The makers narrowed down Malerkotla due to its mosque, local people, narrow lanes, and overall architecture, which creates the verisimilitude of a town from Pakistan. In July 2014, filming resumed in London, United Kingdom near the Houses of Parliament on the banks of River Thames, Charing Cross station, The Oval cricket ground in Lambeth and Ealing road in Wembley. The next shooting schedule was done in various locations in Vancouver, Canada in August 2014, including the centre of West Hastings and Thurlow streets which involved several high-octane chase sequences. In September 2014, the last schedule of the film was completed in Mumbai, with scenes being shot at the city's eastern ferry wharf, near the Gateway of India, and at Filmistan Studios in the suburb of Goregaon. An underwater action sequence has been shot by Saif Ali Khan and Katrina Kaif at the Orca Dive Club in Mumbai.

== Marketing ==
The trailer of the film was released online on 25 July 2015. A launch event was held on the same day with the presence of Kabir Khan, Sajid Nadiadwala, Saif Ali Khan and Katrina Kaif. A promotional song titled 'Afghan Jalebi (Ya Baba)' was released on 30 July 2015. The video was choreographed by Ahmed Khan. Other promotional songs, 'Saware' was released on 13 August 2015 and 'Nachda' on 25 August 2015. The world premiere of the film was scheduled on the closing night of the Indian Film Festival of Melbourne on 27 August 2015.

Saif and Kaif have also promoted the film on several Indian reality television shows, including Dance Plus, Jhalak Dikhhla Jaa Reloaded and Indian Idol Junior. On 23 August 2015, they made an appearance at the 2015 Pro Kabaddi League Final.

== Soundtrack ==
Phantom

Soundtrack album by Pritam
- Released: 10 August 2015
- Genre: Film soundtrack
- Length: 25:52
- Label: T-Series

Pritam chronology
Bajrangi Bhaijaan (2015)	Phantom (2015)	Dilwale (2015)
External audio
- Audio Jukebox on YouTube

The songs featured in the film were composed by Pritam, with lyrics written by Amitabh Bhattacharya and Kausar Munir. The music rights were acquired by T-Series.

No.	Title	Lyrics	Singer(s)	Length
1.	"Afghan Jalebi (Ya Baba)"	Amitabh Bhattacharya	Asrar (Syed Asrar Shah)	03:43
2.	"Saware"	Amitabh Bhattacharya	Arijit Singh	05:21
3.	"Nachda"	Kausar Munir	Shahid Mallya	05:23
4.	"Afghan Jalebi (Film Version)"	Amitabh Bhattacharya	Akhtar Channal	03:44
5.	"Afghan Jalebi (Dumbek Version)"	Amitabh Bhattacharya	Akhtar Channal	03:50
6.	"Ya Baba (Fitna Farebi)"	Amitabh Bhattacharya	Nakash Aziz	03:44
Total length:				25:52

=== Reception ===
BizAsia gave a rating of 7 out of 10 stating Pritam does a good job on bringing the flavours of Western Pakistan home to Bollywood, fitting perfectly with the theme of the film, particularly praising "Afghan Jalebi". Bollywood Hungama rated the soundtrack 3 out of 5, calling it the surprise of the season. The Times of India and Koimoi also gave a rating of 3 out 5 to the soundtrack.

== Release ==
Phantom was released on 28 August 2015 in 2600 screens in India. It was banned in Pakistan following petition by Hafiz Saeed. Lahore High court banned the film.

=== Critical reception ===
Meena Iyer of The Times of India gave Phantom 3.5 stars, calling it an oversimplified but patriotic thriller. Bollywood Hungama gave the film 3.5 stars calling Khan's performance "focussed, clinical and precise, as the role demands" while stating that Kaif is "able support" while performing action scenes. It also praised the background score. Rajeev Masand of IBN Live gave it 2 stars calling it slow-paced, boring and a " wish fulfillment fantasy". Shubha Shetty-Saha of Mid-day gave it 3 stars stating the "powerful story is diluted by the use of too many cinematic liberties and a rather lazy screenplay", "Flaws aside, it talks of a real concern facing all of us, even while taking a flight of fantasy". Shweta Kaushal of Hindustan Times gave it 2.5 stars calling Khan and Kaif's performances "pedestrian" but calling the work of Sohaila Kapur, Mohammed Zeeshan Ayyub and Sabyasachi Chakraborty "power-packed".

=== Box office ===
Phantom grossed ₹84.6 million (US$900,000) on its first day. On the second day it grew approximately 50% reaching a total of ₹212 million (US$2.3 million). By the end of the first weekend, the receipts were ₹338 million (US$3.6 million) nett. Phantom had a decent Monday as it grossed ₹42.5 million (US$450,000). The film grossed ₹35.0 million (US$370,000) on its first Tuesday. Phantom grossed ₹9.3 million (US$99,000) on its 8th day.

By the end of second weekend, Phantom grossed ₹17.5 million (US$190,000) in U.K-Ireland, ₹37.32 lakh (US$40,000) in Australia, ₹1,201,000 (US$13,000) in New Zealand.
