= Sajid Mir =

Pakistani militant (born 1976 or 1978)

Sajid Abdulmajid Mir
- ساجد میر
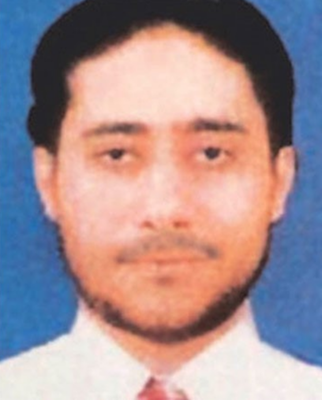
- Mir in an undated photograph
- Born: 1976 or 1978 (age 47–49); Lahore, Punjab, Pakistan
- Died: 2012 (alleged, suspected to be alive)
- Other names: Sajid Majid, Sajid Majid Chaudhary, "Uncle Bill"
- Organization: Lashkar-e-Taiba
- Known for: 26/11 attacks
- Height: 5 ft 5 in to 5 ft 6 in (165-168 cm)
- Conviction: Terror financing (Anti Terrorism Court of Pakistan)
- Penalty: 15 years imprisonment
- Wanted by: NIA, FBI

Sajid Abdulmajid Mir (Note: Urdu: ساجد میر) (born 1976 or 1978) is a Pakistani national and a member of the militant organisation Lashkar-e-Taiba. Mir was the chief planner of the 2008 Mumbai attacks and solicited Pakistani American David Coleman Headley into scouting Denmark for the Copanhagen plot, and has also managed the tasks of the 'foreign affairs' of Lashkar-e-Taiba's international wing.

Declared as dead twice by Pakistani officials, he is still concerned by an international warrant by FBI.

Sajid Mir was initially claimed to be a fictitious character by Pakistan, but was revealed by French magistrate Jean-Louis Bruguière, in a statement to journalist Sebastian Rotella, as a real person. In 2009, Bruguiere also stated that Sajid Mir was a regular official in the Pakistan Army.

After the 2008 Mumbai attacks, Mir was indicted in the United States on April 21, 2011. He was sanctioned as a Specially Designated Global Terrorist in the Specially Designated Nationals and Blocked Persons List on 30 August 2012 by the United States Department of the Treasury's Office of Foreign Assets Control. Mir is listed on the United States Department of State's Rewards for Justice Program for a reward of up to US$5 million for information which leads to his arrest. He is also listed on the FBI Most Wanted list and NIA Most Wanted list. In 2022, an Anti Terrorism Court of Pakistan convicted him of terror financing and sentenced him to 15 years of imprisonment. Which was seen as confusing as the Pakistani authorities had long claimed that Sajid Mir was dead.

China has prevented the United Nations Security Council from designating Mir as a global terrorist under the Al-Qaeda and Taliban Sanctions Committee.

== Early life ==
Sajid Abdulmajid Mir was born to a middle-class Punjabi Muslim family in Lahore. His father, Abdulmajid Mir, who runs a textile business, went to Lahore during the partition of India. Mir is a son-in-law of a retired officer of the Pakistan Army. He has been described as being fluent in Arabic, Urdu and English.

== Militancy ==
Mir was associated with Lashkar-e-Taiba chief Hafiz Muhammad Saeed in 1994, and got early access to Zaki-ur-Rehman Lakhvi. He had also planned terror attacks in the United States, France, Australia and Denmark (the latter for the Jyllands-Posten Muhammad cartoons controversy) with alleged protection from the Inter-Services Intelligence. As fronts for his terror activities, to give his activities an element of deniability, Mir had set up a restaurant in Bangkok and a textile business in Bangladesh.

=== Terrorism plot in Australia ===
Sajid Mir plotted a terrorist attack in Australia in 2003. For the attack plan, Mir recruited Willie Brigitte, a French national who converted to Islam and joined Lashkar-e-Taiba. Willie also funded him to travel to Australia in May 2003. Afterwards, in October 2003, Brigitte was arrested by Sydney police and deported to France, where, in 2007, he was convicted and sentenced to nine years of imprisonment for the charge of 'associating with terrorists', and Sajid Mir was sentenced to 10 years of imprisonment. Willie Brigitte, who used to train Lashkar-e-Taiba members, confessed that Sajid Mir was well known by the Pakistan Army and that Mir never had any problems roaming in the Pakistan Army's areas.

=== 2008 Mumbai attacks ===
Sajid Mir was the chief plotter of the 2008 Mumbai attacks. To carry out the attack, Mir recruited David Coleman Headley (Daood Sayed Gilani) and assisted Headley in visiting Mumbai prior to the attacks. After the terror attack, the FBI listed Sajid Mir as a most wanted terrorist for aiding and abetting, bombing places of public use, providing material support to terrorists, injuring foreign government property, killing citizens outside the United States, and other terrorist activities. Mir has a bounty of US $5 million, as declared by the FBI. In 2012, Sayed Zabiuddin Ansari revealed in interrogation that Sajid Mir had visited India in 2005 with a fake name and passport under the cricket diplomacy to watch the India-Pakistan ODI Cricket match at Mohali. Ansari further revealed that after visiting several places in India, Sajid Mir prepared Taj Hotel's miniature model to familiarize the attackers with the hotel. In 2020, India sought the extradition of Sajid Mir, but Pakistan did not respond.

=== Arrest, conviction, and imprisonment ===
Pakistan earlier denied Mir's presence in their country, and later claimed he died in 2012, but later arrested him in 2022. An anti-terrorism court in Lahore convicted Mir and sentenced him to 15 years of imprisonment with a fine of Pakistani Rs. 4,20,000 in a terror financing case. Pakistan reported to the global terror financing watchdog Financial Action Task Force (FATF) that it had arrested and convicted Mir and sought removal of Pakistan from the 'Grey list' of the FATF. Pakistan was removed from the FATF grey list later that year.

In 2023, a proposal by the United States and India to designate him as a global terrorist was blocked by China. In December 2023, it was reported that Mir was poisoned in prison.

== In popular culture ==
Sajid Mir was portrayed by Mir Sarwar in the 2015 Indian film Phantom and by Faiz Khan in the 2025 Indian spy thriller film Dhurandhar and its sequel the 2026 film Dhurandhar: The Revenge.
