= Chaura Rajputtan =

Village in Pakistan

Coordinates: 31°51′46″N 74°18′19″E

Chauran Adda Rajputtan is a village located 9 km from Muridke, Pakistan. It was established in 1976 by a family named Kamboh. Currently, more than 100 families live in the hamlet.

The area is politically active, and tends to support the Pakistan Tehreek -e-insaf. Economic activity has increased in Chaura Rajputtan since the opening of a large branch of MCB bank.
