= Carlo Rotella =

American non-fiction writer and academic

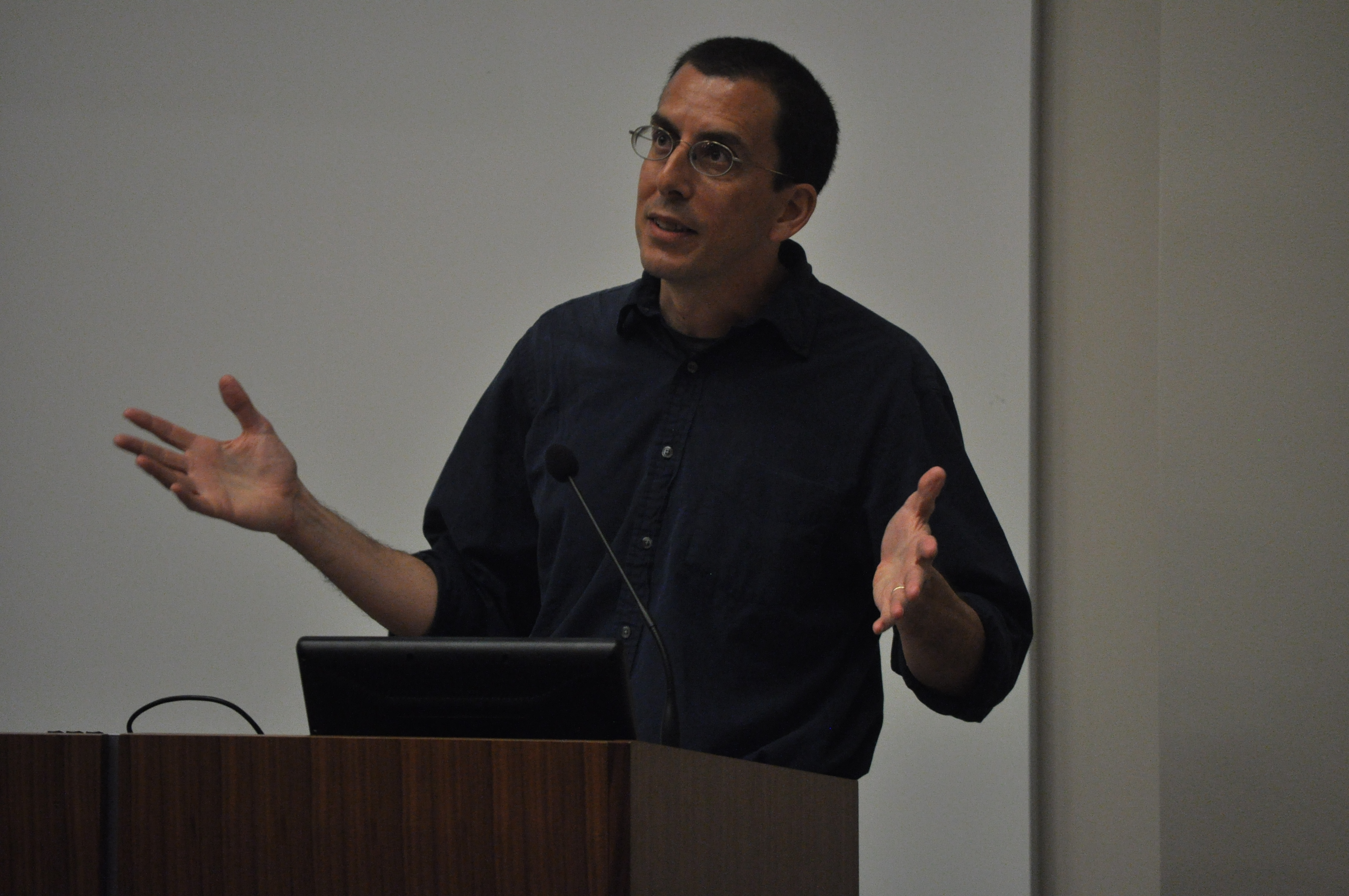
Carlo Rotella (2012)

Carlo Rotella is an American non-fiction writer and academic.

== Life ==
Carlo Rotella is the son of Salvatore Rotella, a chancellor of City Colleges of Chicago originally from Sicily. His mother was from Spain and was a professor of comparative literature at St. Xavier University in Chicago. They lived in South Side, Chicago. He attended the nearby University of Chicago Laboratory Schools. His undergraduate education was at Wesleyan University, and his PhD in American studies from Yale University. He is a professor of American studies, English, and journalism at Boston College.

His books include The World Is Always Coming to an End: Pulling Together and Apart in a Chicago Neighborhood (University of Chicago Press, 2019); Playing in Time: Essays, Profiles, and Other True Stories (University of Chicago Press, 2012); Cut Time: An Education at the Fights (Houghton Mifflin, 2003); Good With Their Hands: Boxers, Bluesmen, and Other Characters from the Rust Belt (University of California Press, 2002); October Cities: The Redevelopment of Urban Literature (University of California Press, 1998). He is co-editor, with Michael Ezra, of The Bittersweet Science: Fifteen Writers in the Gym, in the Corner, and at Ringside (University of Chicago Press, 2017).

Rotella writes for the New York Times Magazine. He has been a regular columnist for the Boston Globe and a radio commentator for WGBH-FM. His work has also appeared in Boston, Washington Post Magazine and The New Yorker.

He has held Guggenheim, Howard, and Du Bois fellowships, and received the Whiting Writers Award, the L. L. Winship / PEN New England Award, and The American Scholar's prizes for Best Essay and Best Work by a Younger Writer. Cut Time was a finalist for the Los Angeles Times Book Prize. He has received U.S. Speaker and Specialist Grants from the State Department to lecture in China and Bosnia and Herzegovina. For the University of Chicago Press, Rotella was a founding editor of a series titled "Chicago Visions and Revisions".

He is the younger brother of journalist Sebastian Rotella.

== Awards ==
- 2006 Guggenheim Fellowship
- Howard fellowships
- Du Bois fellowships
- 2007 Whiting Award
- L. L. Winship/PEN New England Award, Cut Time: An Education at the Fights
- The American Scholar's prizes for Best Essay

== Books ==
- The World Is Always Coming to an End: Pulling Together and Apart in a Chicago Neighborhood (University of Chicago Press, 2019).
- Co-editor, with Michael Ezra, The Bittersweet Science: Fifteen Writers in the Gym, in the Corner, and at Ringside (University of Chicago Press, 2017).
- Playing in Time: Essays, Profiles, and Other True Stories (University of Chicago Press, 2012).
- Cut Time: An Education at the Fights (Houghton Mifflin, 2003).
- Good With Their Hands: Boxers, Bluesmen, and Other Characters from the Rust Belt (University of California Press, 2002).
- October Cities: The Redevelopment of Urban Literature (University of California Press, 1998).

== Essays and articles ==
- "The Unexpected Power of Your Old Neighborhood", The New Yorker (May 22, 2019)
- "The View from 71st and Jeffery: A Chicago Neighborhood Holds a Mirror to a Struggling Middle Class", Fortune (May 30, 2019)
- "A Shrinking Middle Class is Ruining the Character of Our Neighborhoods", The New York Times, May 19, 2019
- "Harry Greb, Gene Tunney, Jack Dempsey, and the Roaring Twenties", The Cambridge Companion to Boxing, ed. Gerald Early (Cambridge University Press, 2019): 79–89
- "'I Come in Here So I Don't Have to Hate Her': Midland and the Barroom Weeper", Journal of Popular Music Studies 30.4 (December 2018): 5–10
- "Otis Rush", New York Times Magazine (December 30, 2018): 20
- "A Tough Crowd in Doboj", Literary Hub (October 12, 2018)
- "Weird Tales", Chicago by the Book: 101 Publications That Shaped the City and Its Image (University of Chicago Press, with the Caxton Club, 2018): 100–101
- "Urban Literature: A User's Guide", Journal of Urban History 44.4 (July 2018): 797-805
- "Prefight: The Baddest 49-Year-Old On the Planet" and "Postfight: Your Intelligence Come Up", The Bittersweet Science: Fifteen Writers in the Gym, in the Corner, and at Ringside, ed. Carlo Rotella and Michael Ezra (University of Chicago Press, 2017): 1–7, 125–150
- "Roy Dotrice", New York Times Magazine (December 25, 2017)
- "Ball Games and War Games", catalogue essay for "PlayTime", an exhibition on games at the Peabody Essex Museum, Salem, MA (October 17, 2017)
- "LaMotta: More Than 'Raging'", The New York Times, (September 22, 2017) A25
- "Foreword", Jack Vance, Cugel: The Skybreak Spatterlight (Spatterlight Press, 2016 [1983])
- "'Hurtin' (On the Bottle)': Margo Price", New York Times Magazine (March 13, 2016): 28–32
- "Buddy Emmons", New York Times Magazine (December 27, 2015): 56
- "No Dragons, No Zombies", Washington Post Magazine (August 2, 2015): 8–15
- "Everything at Once", New York Times Magazine (May 31, 2015): 28–33
- "The Inevitable Spectacle of Mayweather vs Pacquiao", New York Times Magazine (May 1, 2015):
- "Profiling 'Money'", Public Culture (January 2015) 271: 7–19
- "Leading With His Head", New York Times Magazine (November 2, 2014): 22–27
- "The Landscape of Home", Our Boston: Writers Celebrate the City They Love, ed. Andrew Blauner (Houghton Mifflin Harcourt, 2013): 290–300
- "No Child Left Untableted", New York Times Magazine (September 15, 2013): 26–32, 53
- "With a Rebel Twang", New York Times Magazine (March 17, 2013): 36–39
- "Hector 'Macho' Camacho", New York Times Magazine (December 30, 2012): 27
- "The Cult of Micky Ward in Massachusetts", For the Home Team: Essays on Sport, Community, and Identity, ed. Daniel Nathan (University of Illinois Press, Sport and Society series, 2013)
- "The Case Against Kojak Liberalism", The Wire: Race, Class, and Genre, ed. Liam Kennedy and Stephen Shapiro (University of Michigan Press, 2012): 113–129
- "Within Limits: On the Greatness of Magic Slim", Pop When the World Falls Apart, ed. Eric Weisbard (Duke University Press, 2012): 230–239
- "Hollywood on the Charles", Boston (January, 2012): 39–43
- "So Many Fearsome Contemporaries", New York Times Magazine (December 25, 2011): 28–29
- "A Darker Shade of Green", New York Times Magazine (August 15, 2011): 34–38
- "A Wild Mind Loose in Suburbia", New York Times Magazine (April 24, 2011): 24–29
- "True to True Grit", New York Times Magazine (December 12, 2010): 11–12
- "The Professor of Micropopularity", New York Times Magazine (November 28, 2010): 50–55
- "Ghosts", My Town: Writers on American Cities (US State Department, 2016) Excerpted online
- "The Long Shot", Washington Post Magazine (March 21, 2010): cover, 10–17
- "Class Warrior", The New Yorker (February 1, 2010): 24–29
- "The End of American Sporting Life", A New Literary History of America, ed. Greil Marcus and Werner Sollors (Harvard University Press, 2009): 856–860
- "Desperately Seeking Deval", Boston (September, 2009): 74–79, 134–142
- "The Genre Artist", New York Times Magazine (July 19, 2009): 20–25
- "Crime Story", Washington Post Magazine (July 20, 2008): cover, 8–15, 22–26
- "And Now, the Biggest Entertainer in Entertainment", Play: The New York Times Sports Magazine (June 1, 2008): 56–61, 87
- "Praying for Stones Like This: The Godfather Trilogy", Catholics in the Movies, ed. Colleen McDannell (Oxford University Press, 2007): 227–252
- "When the Gloves Came Off", Boston (November 2007): 120–123, 134–139
- "Pulp History", Raritan 271 (Summer 2007): 11–36
- "Shannon Briggs Says Nyet", New York Times Magazine (April 15, 2007): 36–39
- "The Two Jameses", The Believer (April, 2007): 49–54
- "The Elements of Providence", Washington Post Magazine (September 17, 2006): 24–28, 51–53
- "The Kingdom and the Power", Boston (August 2006): 69–84

== Anthologies ==
- Colleen McDannell, ed. (2007). "Praying for Stones Like This: The Godfather Trilogy". Catholics in the Movies. Oxford University Press. pp. 227–252. ISBN 978-0-19-530656-9.
- William J. Savage; Daniel Simon, eds. (1999). "The Story of Decline and the October City". The man with the golden arm. Seven Stories Press. ISBN 978-1-58322-008-5.
