= Salman Masood =

Pakistani journalist

- سلمان مسعود
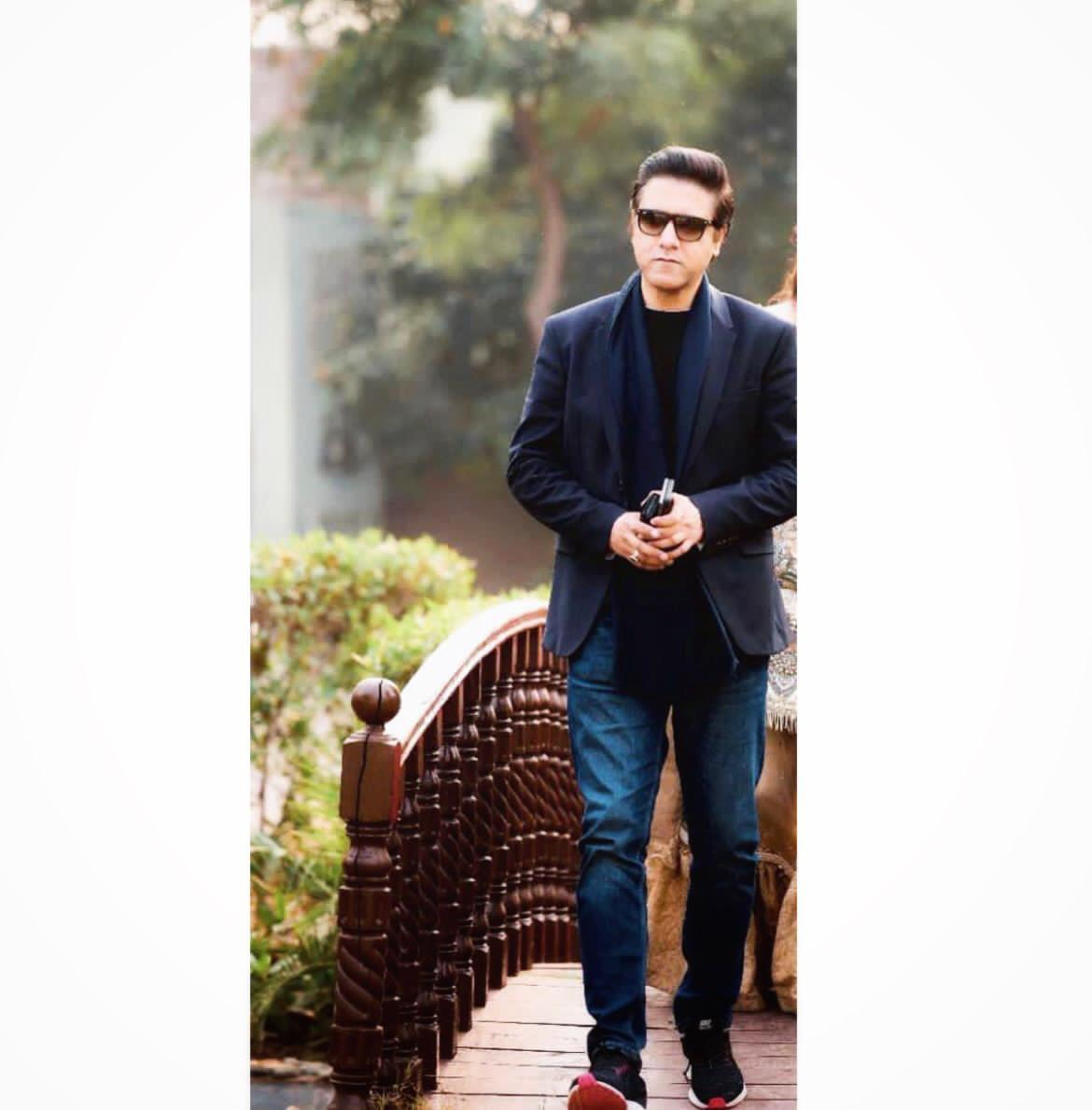
- Education: Quaid-e-Azam University
- Occupation: Journalist
- Years active: 2001–present
- Employer: The New York Times

Salman Masood (Urdu: سلمان مسعود) is a Pakistani journalist who has been working as a Pakistan correspondent for The New York Times since 2001. He is also the Editor, Pakistan The Nation. The focus of his reporting has been on politics and terrorism. In 2009, he contributed to The New York Times reporting team that won the Pulitzer Prize for coverage of Pakistan and Afghanistan.

== Career ==
Masood started his career in October 2001 by joining the Islamabad bureau of The New York Times. He initially worked as a researcher, but later became a bureau manager. He became a reporter in September 2003, and travelled extensively across Pakistan to cover various stories. He was part of The New York Times reporting team that won the Pulitzer Prize in 2009 for coverage of Pakistan and Afghanistan.

In 2013–14, he worked as the editor of Pique magazine.

The Pakistan Rangers, a paramilitary force, conducted a warrantless search of Masood's home in Islamabad, ostensibly searching for a suspected terrorist unrelated to Masood, on 12 January 2016. The Interior Ministry apologized for the incident and denied that Masood had been targeted. Journalists staged a walkout of the National Assembly of Pakistan, while Human Rights Watch condemned the incident.

On 8 January 2020, Masood was promoted as the editor of The Nation newspaper, having previously worked as resident editor Islamabad and Khyber Pakhtunkhwa.

== Work ==
In 2024, he published his book "Fall Out," which examines Pakistan's political landscape from 2014 to 2023, focusing on Imran Khan's transition from a opposition figure to the Prime Minister of the country, and his intricate relationship with the Pakistani military.

== Personal life and education ==
Salman Masood was born and raised in Islamabad. He holds a master's degree in international relations from Quaid-i-Azam University, Islamabad.
