= Zakiur Rehman Lakhvi =

Lashkar-e-Taiba leader (born 1960)

- ذکی الرحمٰن لکھوی
- Born: 30 December 1960 (age 65); Okara District, Punjab, Pakistan
- Citizenship: Pakistan
- Known for: 2008 Mumbai attacks
- Title: Co-founder of Lashkar-e-Taiba

Zakiur Rehman Lakhvi (Urdu: ذکی الرحمٰن لکھوی, born 30 December 1960) is a Pakistani Islamist militant and co-founder of Lashkar-e-Taiba. One of the prime perpetrators of the 2008 Mumbai attacks, he is featured on India's NIA Most Wanted list. In January 2021, he was arrested by Pakistani authorities and sentenced to three concurrent five-year sentences in jail for terror financing in an unrelated case.

A graduate of Jamia Mohammadia in Gujranwala, an Ahl-e-Hadith school, he has been considered by Amir Hamza, a co-founder of the LeT, as "the architect of Salafi jihad in Pakistan." He has orchestrated terrorist attacks in Afghanistan, Chechnya, Bosnia, Iraq, and Southeast Asia. He is referred to as Chachu, or Uncle, by trainees.

After the 2008 Mumbai attacks, he was sanctioned by the Al-Qaida and Taliban Sanctions Committee of the UN Security Council. He is also listed on the U.S. Department of the Treasury's SDN List as a Specially Designated Global Terrorist. His addresses therein are listed at Renala Khurd Tehsil in Okara District and Bhara Kahu in Islamabad.

== Early life and activities ==
Lakhvi was born on 30 December 1960 in the Okara district of Punjab, Pakistan. His mother is the stepsister of Maulana Moeenuddin Lakhvi, an Ahl-e-Hadith scholar and leader hailing from Firozpur who died in 2011 at the age of 93.

In 1982, he would participate in the Afghan Jihad, eventually becoming LeT's military chief.

In 1999, at a three-day annual congregation held at Muridke, he explained the reason for fidayeen suicide squad missions in the aftermath of the Kargil War: "After the Pakistani withdrawal from Kargil and the Nawaz-Clinton statement in Washington, it was important to boost the morale of the Kashmiri people. These Fidayen missions were initiated to teach India a lesson as they were celebrating after the Kargil war." He said that the next target would be New Delhi.

In 2006, he asked LeT's members to begin training operatives for suicide bombings. In the past, he told operatives to mount attacks in well-populated areas. Indian officials claim Lakhvi also oversaw Azam Cheema, who has been accused of being a leader in the 2006 bombing of the Mumbai rail network that killed more than 200 and left 700 injured.

In May 2008, the US Treasury Department announced that it had frozen the assets of four Lashkar-e-Taiba leaders including Lakhvi.

== 2008 Mumbai attacks ==
On 3 December 2008 Indian officials named him as one of four possible major planners behind the November 2008 Mumbai Attacks. He reportedly offered to pay the family of Ajmal Kasab the sum of Rs.150,000 for his participation in the attacks. On 7 December 2008 Pakistani armed forces arrested Lakhvi in a raid on an LeT training camp near Muzafarabad in Pakistani Kashmir. He was among 12 people detained. Pakistan confirmed the arrest but refused to hand over any of its citizens to Indian authorities. Officials stated that any Pakistani citizen accused of involvement in the attack would be tried in Pakistan.

On 12 February 2009 Rehman Malik, Interior Minister, stated that Lakhvi was still in custody and under investigation as the foremost mastermind behind the attacks.

On 25 November 2009 a Pakistani anti-terrorism court formally charged seven suspects, including LeT commander Lakhvi, with planning and helping execute the Mumbai attacks, an action that came a day before the first anniversary of the brazen assault.

On 18 December 2014, two days after the Peshawar school attack where 132 school children were massacred by Pakistani Taliban, the Pakistani anti-terrorism court granted bail to Lakhvi in Mumbai attacks case against payment of surety bonds worth Rs. 500,000. On 19 December Lakhvi's bail was rejected by the high court. Pakistan assured that Lakhvi was not released and was in jail. The step was called 'positive' by Indian government.

On 7 January 2015 Lakhvi's bail was rejected by the Supreme Court and the case referred back to the high court, who reinstated the bail; though he may still remain in jail for a month in a kidnapping case. The surety bond required from Lakhvi has a value of US $2,300. Lakhvi was released from jail on bail on 10 April 2015.

=== Arrest and Trial ===
On 2 January, 2021, Lakhvi was arrested in Lahore, on the charges of terror financing. Lakhvi was handed a 15 year sentence for the charges, and the arrest was carried out due to compliance with the Financial Action Task Force norms after Pakistan was put in the FATF greylist in 2018. Following his sentencing, along with other 26/11 masterminds Hafiz Saeed and Sajid Mir, Pakistan was removed from FATF greylist in October 2022.

In November 2024, a video verified through facial recognition showed Lakhvi participating in a fitness test, raising concerns about Pakistan's compliance with international sanctions. Despite his conviction, Lakhvi was reported to move freely in Lahore, Rawalpindi, and Okara. India Today's intelligence sources described his arrest as a media spectacle, with no genuine enforcement of restrictions.

== State patronage ==
It is widely held that both the Pakistan Army and the ISI have ensured that crucial evidence against Lakhvi in the Mumbai terror attack case is not presented before the court. During his stay in Adiala Jail Rawalpindi, he was provided access to a cellphone and permission to meet his close associates.

China has blocked the United Nations' attempts to place Lakhvi on its list of suspected terrorists whose financial assets should be frozen.
