= Rommel Rodrigues =

Indian writer and filmmaker

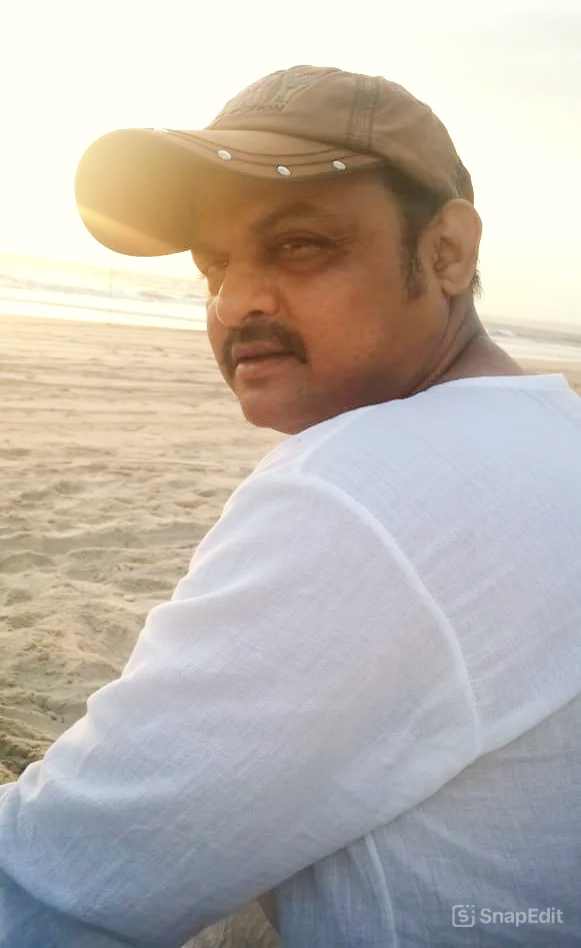
- Occupations: Journalist, author, screenwriter, film director, and producer

Rommel Rodrigues is an Indian author, film director, screenwriter, and producer based in Mumbai. He worked as a journalist for Indian newspapers, covering crime, business, politics, and current affairs. Until 2024, he served as spokesperson and head of media and communication for the Mumbai Regional Congress Committee, a branch of the Indian National Congress.

== Films ==
Rodrigues co-wrote and served as associate director for The Attacks of 26/11, a 2013 film directed by Ram Gopal Varma. He produced and directed the Marathi film Gurukul, based on his own script, which promotes the traditional lavani dance form.

== Books ==
- Kasab: The Face of 26/11 ISBN 978-0-14-341547-3
- Everything You Wanted to Know About Business & Economics ISBN 93-80200-50-1
- Simplifying Business, Economics & Jargons ISBN 978-93-80200-69-9
- Rodrigues, Rommel (3 December 2023). Illusion of Justice - 18-Steps Program to Overhaul the Indian Judicial System (1 ed.). India: Thomson Reuters. p. 228. ISBN 978-93-95696-62-3.
- Editor - The Market Mafia : Chronicle of India's High-Tech Stock Market Scandal & The Cabal That Went Scot-Free ISBN 1-64951-847-1
