= Nangal Sahdan =

Nangal Sahdan ننگل ساہداں
- Town
- Nangal Sahdan
- Location within Pakistan
- Coordinates: 31.836°N 74.263°E
- Country: Pakistan
- Province: Punjab
- Elevation: 205 m (673 ft)

Population (2017)
  - Estimate: 22,500
- Time zone: UTC+5 (PST)
- Postal code: 39001
- Calling code: 0423

Nangal Sahdan (Urdu: ننگل ساہداں) is a town in suburb of Muridke in the Sheikhupura District of Punjab, Pakistan.
