= Lashkar-e-Taiba =

Islamist-Jihadist Pakistani militant organisation

- لشکرِ طیبہ
- Flag of Lashkar-e-Taiba
- Other name: جماعت الدعوہ
- Founders: Hafiz Muhammad Saeed; Zafar Iqbal Shehbaz; Abdullah Yusuf Azzam X; Amir Hamza; Abdul Rehman Makki #; Zakiur Rehman Lakhvi
- Ameer: Hafiz Muhammad Saeed
- Naib Ameer: Zafar Iqbal (co-founder of Jamaat-ud-Dawa)
- Spokesman: Muhammad Yahya Mujahid
- Dates active: 1985/1986–present
- Groups: The Resistance Front (Note: TRF is active in the insurgency in Jammu and Kashmir. Lashkar-e-Taiba and Hizbul Mujahideen leaders form the core of the TRF. United Liberation Front, a group of Al-Badr, also works with the TRF.); Virginia jihad network; Jamaat-ud-Dawa; Milli Muslim League; Jamaat al-Dawah ila al-Quran wal-Sunnah (negated); Tehreek-e-Azaadi Jammu and Kashmir
- Headquarters: Muridke, Punjab, Pakistan
- Active regions: Worldwide, predominantly in the Indian subcontinent: Pakistan; India; Afghanistan; Australia; United States; Bangladesh; Nepal
- Ideology: Ahl-e-Hadith; Salafi jihadism; Sunni Islamism; Pan-Islamism; Sunni–Shia unity; Islamic fundamentalism; Ghazwa-e-Hind; Anti-Hindu; Anti-Communism; Anti-Sovietism; Anti-Zionism; Antisemitism; Pakistani nationalism
- Political position: Far-right
- Status: Active
- Size: Unknown
- Part of: United Jihad Council
- Wars: Kashmir conflict; Insurgency in Jammu and Kashmir; Afghan conflict; Soviet–Afghan War (1979-1989); Afghan Civil War (1989–1992); Afghan Civil War (1992–1996); Afghan Civil War (1996–2001); War in Afghanistan (2001–2021)

Lashkar-e-Taiba (LeT) (Note: Urdu: لشکرِ طیبہ [ˈləʃkəɾ eː ˈtəjjɪbaː]; literally 'Army of the Good', translated as Army of the Righteous or Army of the Pure, and alternatively spelled as Lashkar-e-Tayyiba, Lashkar-e-Toiba, Lashkar-i-Taiba, Lashkar-i-Tayyeba.) is a Pakistani Islamist Jihadist militant organisation driven by a Salafi jihadist ideology. The organisation's primary stated objective is to merge the whole of Kashmir with Pakistan. It also seeks the destruction of India, Hinduism, and Judaism through jihad. It was founded in 1985–1986 by Hafiz Saeed, Zafar Iqbal Shehbaz, Abdullah Azzam and several other Islamist mujahideen with funding from Osama bin Laden during the Soviet–Afghan War. It has been designated as a terrorist group by the United Nations and numerous other countries and been responsible for terrorist attacks on civilians in India, such as the 2000 Red Fort attack, 2005 Delhi bombings, 2006 Mumbai train bombings, 2008 Mumbai attacks, 2025 Pahalgam attack and the 2026 Kulgam attack.

It has been supported by Pakistan’s intelligence agency, the Inter-Services Intelligence (ISI), and is often viewed as a proxy militant organisation used by Pakistan against India in the insurgency in Indian-administered Jammu and Kashmir.

Its affiliated front organisations include the Milli Muslim League, a political party, and Jamat-ud-Dawa (JuD), the group's "charity wing". The group differs from most other militant groups in Pakistan in following the Islamic interpretation of Ahl-i Hadith (which is similar to Wahhabism and Salafism), and in foreswearing attacks on the government of Pakistan and sectarian attacks on Pakistanis "who have professed faith" in Islam.

== Objectives ==
While the primary area of operations of LeT's jihadist activities is the Kashmir Valley, their professed goal is not limited to challenging India's sovereignty over Jammu and Kashmir. LeT sees the issue of Kashmir as part of a wider global struggle. Once Kashmir is liberated, LeT seeks to use it "as a base of operations to conquer India and force Muslim rule to the Indian subcontinent."

LeT’s ideology is fundamentally anti-Western, with the British Raj held responsible for the decline of the Mughal Empire. Consequently, LeT opposes any form of Western or British influence in Pakistan and the broader South Asian region. In its publications and on various platforms, the organisation has consistently articulated its primary political goals, which include the destruction of India, Hinduism, and Judaism. The organisation considers jihad a religious duty for all Muslims, with the establishment of a caliphate as its central religious and political objective.

C. Christine Fair, who has analyzed LeT propaganda since 1995, notes that the militant organisation has consistently condemned what it describes as a "Brahmanic-Talmudic-Crusader" alliance of Hindus, Jews, and Christians, whom it accuses of collaborating to undermine the Ummah.

Its followers are proponents of the South Asian group Ahl-e-Hadith (AeH) Islam, which is considered Salafist. It has adopted maximalist agenda of global jihad including attacks on civilians. The group justifies its ideology on verse 2:216 of the Quran.

Fighting has been made obligatory upon you ˹believers˺, though you dislike it. Perhaps you dislike something which is good for you and like something which is bad for you. Allah knows and you do not know.

Extrapolating from this verse, the group asserts that military jihad is a religious obligation of all Muslims and defines the many circumstances under which it must be carried out. In a pamphlet entitled "Why Are We Waging Jihad?", the group states that all of India along with many other countries were once ruled by Muslims and were Muslim lands, which is their duty to take it back from the non-Muslims. It declared United States, India, and Israel as "existential enemies of Islam". LeT believes that jihad is the duty of all Muslims and must be waged until eight objectives are met: Establishing Islam as the dominant way of life in the world, forcing disbelievers to pay jizya, exacting revenge for killed Muslims, punishing enemies for violating oaths and treaties, defending all Muslim states, and recapturing occupied Muslim territory. The group construes lands once ruled by Muslims as Muslim lands and considers it as their duty to get them back. It embraces a pan-Islamist rationale for military action.

In the wake of the 2008 Mumbai attacks investigations of computer and email accounts revealed a list of 320 locations worldwide deemed as possible targets for attack. Analysts believed that the list was a statement of intent rather than a list of locations where LeT cells had been established and were ready to strike.

Unlike other Pakistan-based Salafi-jihadist militant organisations, LeT has "publicly [renounced] sectarian violence against other Islamic sects". While it has waged violent jihad outside of Pakistan, inside the country, the group has spent considerable effort and resources on "preaching and social welfare". This along with its professed opposition to not fighting "those who have professed Faith" in Islam (where thousands of Muslims have been killed in sectarian attacks), has built up significant goodwill among Pakistanis, especially pious Muslims and the poor (helping to protect the group from foreign pressure on the Pakistan government to stop LeT's killing of foreigners). Although it views Pakistan's ruling powers as hypocrites (self-proclaimed but insincere Muslims), it doesn't support revolutionary jihad at home because the struggle in Pakistan "is not a struggle between Islam and disbelief". The pamphlet "Why do we do Jihad?" states, "If we declare war against those who have professed Faith, we cannot do war with those who haven’t." The group instead seeks to reform errant Muslims through dawa. It aims to bring Pakistanis to LeT's interpretation of Ahl-e-Hadith Islam and thus, transforming the society in which they live.

LeT's leaders have argued that Indian-administered Jammu and Kashmir was the closest occupied land, and observed that the ratio of occupying forces to the population there was one of the highest in the world, meaning this was among the most substantial occupations of Muslim land. Thus, LeT cadres could volunteer to fight on other fronts but were obligated to fight in Indian-administered Kashmir.

In January 2009, LeT publicly declared that it would pursue a peaceful resolution in the Kashmir issue and that it did not have global jihadist aims, but the group is still believed to be active in several other spheres of anti-Indian militancy. The disclosures of Abu Jundal, who was sent to India by the Saudi Arabian government, however, revealed that LeT is planning to revive militancy in Jammu and Kashmir and conduct major attacks in India.

== Leadership ==
- Hafiz Muhammad Saeed – founder of LeT and aamir of its political arm, JuD. Shortly after the 2008 Mumbai attacks Saeed denied any links between the two groups: "No Lashkar-e-Taiba man is in Jamaat-ud-Dawa and I have never been a chief of Lashkar-e-Taiba." On 25 June 2014, the United States declared JuD an affiliate of LeT.
- Abdul Rehman Makki – second in command of LeT. Until his death, he was the brother-in-law of Hafiz Muhammad Saeed. The US has offered a reward of $2 million for information leading to the location of Makki.
- Zakiur Rehman Lakhvi – released on bail from custody of Pakistan military – senior member of LeT. Named as one of the masterminds of the 2008 Mumbai attacks. On 18 December 2014 (two days after the Peshawar school attack), the Pakistani anti-terrorism court granted Lakhvi bail against payment of surety bonds worth Rs. 500,000.
- Yusuf Muzammil – senior member of LeT and named as a mastermind of the 2008 Mumbai attacks by surviving gunman Ajmal Kasab.
- Zarrar Shah – in Pakistani custody – one of LeT's primary liaisons to the ISI. A US official said that he was a "central character" in the planning behind the 2008 Mumbai attacks. Zarrar Shah has boasted to Pakistani investigators about his role in the attacks.
- Muhammad Ashraf – LeT's top financial officer. Although not directly connected to the Mumbai plot, after the attacks he was added to the UN list of people that sponsor terrorism. However, Geo TV reported that six years earlier Ashraf became seriously ill while in custody and died at Civil Hospital on 11 June 2002.
- Mahmoud Mohamed Ahmed Bahaziq – the leader of LeT in Saudi Arabia and one of its financiers. Although not directly connected to the Mumbai plot, after the attacks he was added to the UN list of people that sponsor terrorism.
- Nasr Javed – a Kashmiri senior operative, is on the list of individuals banned from entering the United Kingdom for "engaging in unacceptable behaviour by seeking to foment, justify or glorify terrorist violence in furtherance of particular beliefs."
- Abu Nasir (Srinagar commander)
- Zafar Iqbal is a senior leader and co-founder of Lashkar-e-Tayyiba. Born in one of the Pakistani, well-known, prosperous landlord,(zamindar) of Gujrat Sardar Ali Khan's house. He formed in the late 1980s with current LeT emir Hafiz Muhammad Saeed and LeT financier and senior member Mahmoud Mohammad Bahaziq. Zafar Iqbal has served in various Lashkar-e-Tayyiba/Jamaat-ud-Dawa (LeT/JuD) senior leadership positions. Zafar Iqbal has also been involved in LeT/JuD fundraising activities. Iqbal travelled to Jeddah, Saudi Arabia to request financial support from former Al-Qaida leader Osama bin Laden.

As of late 2010, Iqbal was in charge of the LeT/JuD finance department. As of early 2010, Iqbal was also the director of the LeT/JuD education. As of 2010, Iqbal was also the president of the LeT/JuD medical wing and secretary of a university trust created by LeT/JuD to carry out unspecified activities on behalf of the group.

== History ==
=== Formation ===
In 1985, Hafiz Mohammed Saeed and Zafar Iqbal formed the Jamaat-ud-Dawa (Organisation for Preaching, or JuD) as a small missionary group dedicated to promoting an Ahl-e-Hadith version of Islam. In the next year, Zaki-ur Rehman Lakvi merged his group of anti-Soviet jihadists with the JuD to form the Markaz-ud Dawa-wal-Irshad (Center for Preaching and Guidance, or MDI). The MDI had 17 founders originally, and notable among them was Abdullah Azzam. Azzam would be killed in a car bombing orchestrated by Khad in 1989.

The LeT was formed in Afghanistan's Kunar province in 1990 and gained prominence in the early 1990s as a military offshoot of MDI. MDI's primary concerns were dawah and the LeT focused on jihad although the members did not distinguish between the two groups' functions. According to Hafiz Saeed, "Islam propounds both dawa[h] and jihad. Both are equally important and inseparable. Since our life revolves around Islam, therefore both dawa and jihad are essential; we cannot prefer one over the other."

Most of these training camps were located in North-West Frontier Province (NWFP) and many were shifted to Pakistan-administered Azad Kashmir for the sole purpose of training volunteers for terrorism in India. From 1991 onward, militancy surged in India, as many Lashkar-e-Taiba volunteers were infiltrated into Indian-administered Jammu and Kashmir from Pakistan-administered Azad Kashmir with the help of the Pakistan Army and ISI. As of 2010, the degree of control that Pakistani intelligence retains over LeT's operations is not known.

=== Designation as terrorist group ===
On 28 March 2001, in Statutory Instrument 2001 No. 1261, British Home Secretary Jack Straw designated the group a Proscribed Terrorist Organisation under the Terrorism Act 2000.

On 5 December 2001, the group was added to the Terrorist Exclusion List. In a notification dated 26 December 2001, United States Secretary of State Colin Powell, designated Lashkar-e-Taiba a Foreign Terrorist Organization.

Lashkar-e-Taiba was banned in Pakistan on 12 January 2002.

It is banned in India as a designated terrorist group under the Unlawful Activities (Prevention) Act.

It was listed as a terrorist organisation in Australia under the Security Legislation Amendment (Terrorism) Act 2002 on 11 April 2003 and was re-listed on 11 April 2005 and 31 March 2007.

On 2 May 2008, it was placed on the Consolidated List established and maintained by the committee established by the United Nations Security Council Resolution 1267 as an entity associated with al-Qaeda. The report also proscribed Jamaat-ud-Dawa as a front group of the LeT. Bruce Riedel, an expert on terrorism, believes that LeT with the support of its Pakistani backers is more dangerous than al-Qaeda.

=== Aftermath of Mumbai attacks ===
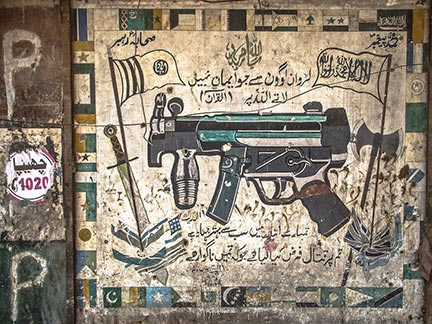
Pakistani street art of the Lashkar e Taiba

According to a media report, the US accused JuD of being the front group for the prime suspects of the 2008 Mumbai attacks, the Lashkar-e-Taiba, the organisation that trained the 10 gunmen involved in these attacks.

A report for Canada's Talk Nation Radio on the regional tensions arising from the Mumbai attacks
Journalist Graham Usher discusses the tensions between Pakistan and India arising from the attacks. In the report from Islamabad, broadcast on 9 December 2008, he also discusses the regional role of the United States.

On 7 December 2008, under pressure from the US and India, Pakistan Army launched an operation against LeT and raided a markaz (center) of the LeT at Shawai Nullah, 5 km from Muzaffarabad in Pakistan administered Azad Kashmir. The army arrested more than twenty members of the LeT including Zaki-ur-Rehman Lakhvi, the alleged mastermind of the Mumbai attacks. They are said to have sealed off the center, which included a madrasah and a mosque alongside offices of the LeT according to the government of Pakistan.

On 10 December 2008, India formally requested the United Nations Security Council to designate JuD as a terrorist organisation. Subsequently, Pakistan's ambassador to the United Nations Abdullah Hussain gave an undertaking, saying,

After the designation of Jamaat-ud-Dawah (JUD) under (resolution) 1267, the government on receiving communication from the Security Council shall proscribe the JUD and take other consequential actions, as required, including the freezing of assets.

A similar assurance was given by Pakistan in 2002 when it clamped down on the LeT; however, the LeT was covertly allowed to function under the guise of the JuD. While arrests have been made, the Pakistani government has categorically refused to allow any foreign investigators access to Hafiz Muhammad Saeed.

On 11 December 2008, the United Nations Security Council imposed sanctions on JuD, declaring it a global terrorist group. Saeed, the chief of JuD, declared that his group would challenge the sanctions imposed on it in all forums. Pakistan's government also banned the JuD on the same day and issued an order to seal the JuD in all four provinces, as well as Pakistan-administered Azad Kashmir. Before the ban JuD, ran a weekly newspaper named Ghazwah, two monthly magazines called Majalla Tud Dawaa and Zarb e Taiba, and a fortnightly magazine for children, Nanhe Mujahid. The publications have since been banned by the Pakistani government. In addition to the prohibition of JuD's print publications, the organisation's websites were also shut down by the Pakistani government.

After the UNSC ban, Hindu minority groups in Pakistan came out in support of JuD. At protest marches in Hyderabad, Hindu groups said that JuD does charity work such as setting up water wells in desert regions and providing food to the poor. However, according to the BBC, the credibility of the level of support for the protest was questionable as protesters on their way to what they believed was a rally against price rises had been handed signs in support of JuD. The JuD ban has been met with heavy criticism in many Pakistani circles, as JuD was the first to react to the Kashmir earthquake and the Ziarat earthquake. It also ran over 160 schools with thousands of students and provided aid in hospitals as well.

In January 2009, JuD spokesperson, Abdullah Muntazir, stressed that the group did not have global jihadist aspirations and would welcome a peaceful resolution of the Kashmir issue. He also publicly disowned LeT commanders Zaki-ur-Rehman Lakhvi and Zarrar Shah, who have both been accused of being the masterminds behind the Mumbai attacks.

In response to the UN resolution and the government ban, the JuD reorganised itself under the name of Tehreek-e-Tahafuz Qibla Awal (TTQA).

On 25 June 2014, the United States added several of LeT affiliates including Jamaat-ud-Dawa, Al-Anfal Trust, Tehrik-e-Hurmat-e-Rasool, and Tehrik-e-Tahafuz Qibla Awwal to the list of foreign terrorist organisations.

According to Stephen Tankel, writing in 2011,

despite the "chorus" of diplomats, security officials and military officers" calling for Pakistan to clamp down on LeT, Pakistan has and will continue to resist. This is because LeT is "one of the few militant outfits that officially refrain from launching attacks in Pakistan", which, with the group's trained fighters and resources would be very bad for the stability of Pakistan if it did. Secondly, the Pakistani army and its powerful Inter-Services Intelligence Directorate (ISI) have long considered LeT to be the country’s most reliable proxy against India and the group still provides utility in this regard as well as the potential for leverage at the negotiating table. Thus, the consensus is that, at least in the short-term, taking steps to dismantle the group would chiefly benefit India, while Pakistan would be left to deal with the costs.

=== Milli Muslim League ===
Jamaat-ud-Dawa members on 7 August 2017 announced the creation of a political party called Milli Muslim League. Tabish Qayoum, a JuD activist working as the party spokesman, stated they had filed registration papers for a new party with Pakistan's electoral commission. Later in August, JuD under the banner of the party fielded a candidate for the 2017 by-election of Constituency NA-120. Muhammad Yaqoob Sheikh filed his nomination papers as an independent candidate.

The registration application of the party was rejected by ECP on 12 October. Hafiz Saeed announced in December, a few days after release from house arrest on 24 November, that his organisation will contest the 2018 elections.

=== Name changes ===
In February 2019, after the Pulwama attack, the Pakistan government placed the ban once again on Jamat-ud-Dawa and its charity organisation Falah-e-Insaniat Foundation (FIF). To evade the ban, their names were changed to Al Madina and Aisar Foundation respectively and they continued their work as before.

=== People's Anti-Fascist Front ===
The PAFF was originally thought to be a faction of Lashkar-e-Taiba according to Indian officials. The Indian police claimed it is an offshoot of Jaish-e-Muhammad. The PAFF was created during the wake of the 2019 Kashmir Protests after the revocation of autonomy of the Jammu and Kashmir. The PAFF has claimed responsibility of many attacks in Kashmir against Indian forces.

=== Influence in Kashmir ===
After the Mujahideen victory against the Soviet Union occupation in Afghanistan, Lashkar-e-Taiba and Mujahideen fighters, with the aid of Pakistan, slowly infiltrated Jammu and Kashmir with the goal of spreading a radical Islamist Ideology to Jihad against Indian administration in Jammu and Kashmir.

In July 2025, Indian security forces carried out a high-profile counter-terrorism operation near Srinagar, killing three Pakistani terrorists affiliated with Lashkar-e-Taiba. Among those neutralised was Suleiman Shah, identified as the mastermind behind the 22 April Pahalgam terror attack that claimed 26 civilian lives. The operation, codenamed Operation Mahadev, also eliminated two other LeT operatives—Abu Hamza and Yasir, both linked to the same attack.

Suleiman, a former Pakistan Army soldier, had a ₹20 lakh (2,000,000) bounty on his head and was classified as a high-value target. The joint operation was launched by the Indian Army, CRPF, and Jammu and Kashmir Police based on specific intelligence in the Mulnar area of Harwan. The success of the operation is seen as a significant setback to Lashkar-e-Taiba, coming shortly after the United Nations banned The Resistance Front (TRF), a proxy outfit of LeT.

== Activities ==
The group operates terrorist training camps and does humanitarian work. Across Pakistan, the organisation runs 16 Islamic institutions, 135 secondary schools, an ambulance service, mobile clinics, blood banks and seminaries according to the South Asia Terrorism Portal.

In 2002, the group's annual religious congregation (ijtema) was the second-largest gathering among Pakistan's religious parties, with around 1 million participants, after Tablighi Jamaat (2 million) but ahead of other traditional Islamist parties such as the Jamaat-e-Islami (500,000).

The group actively carries out suicide attacks on Indian Armed Forces in Jammu and Kashmir.

Some breakaway Lashkar-e-Taiba members have been accused of carrying out attacks in Pakistan, particularly in Karachi, to mark its opposition to the policies of former president Pervez Musharraf.

=== Publications ===
Christine Fair estimates that, through its editing house Dar al Andalus, "LeT is perhaps the most prolific producer of jihadi literature in Pakistan." By the end of the 90s, the Urdu monthly magazine Mujallah al-Dawah had a circulation of 100 000, another monthly magazine, Ghazwa, of 20 000, while other weekly and monthly publications target students (Zarb-e-Tayyaba), female students (Tayyabaat), children and those who are literate in English (Voice of Islam and Invite) or Arabic (al-Ribat). It also published, every year, around 100 booklets, in many languages. It has been described as a "profitable department, selling lacs of books every year."

=== Antisemitism ===
Lashkar-e-Taiba, the Pakistan-based Islamic terrorist group, has also expressed antisemitic views. The organisation declares the Jewish people to be "Enemies of Islam" and designates Israel as an "Enemy of Pakistan".

The Hasidic Jewish (Chabad) religious centre Nariman House in Mumbai was hit by Lashkar-e-Taiba militants during the 2008 Mumbai attacks in India. The sole surviving perpetrator of the attack, Ajmal Kasab, was eventually captured by Indian security forces. Antisemitic views were evident from the testimonies of Kasab following his arrest and trial.

=== Markaz-e-Taiba ===
The LeT headquarters called Markaz-e-Taiba is in Nangal Saday, about 5 km north of Muridke, on the eastern side of the G.T. road; about 30 km from Lahore, Punjab. Established in 1988, it is spread over 200 acres (0.81 km^{2}) and contains a madrassa, hospital, market, residences, a fish farm and agricultural tracts. The initial sectarian religious training, Daura-e-Sufa is imparted here to the militants. Supporters of Pakistan-based militant groups, including Lashkar-e-Taiba and the al-Qaeda-linked 313 Brigade, posted videos on TikTok, YouTube, and Google from here. The videos, verified and geolocated by Sky News, showed armed men and children engaging in martial arts training, and captions promoting jihad. Hashtags like "#313" and terms such as "mujahid" were used to signal affiliation with banned groups. Analysts noted that the posts formed part of a coordinated propaganda campaign aimed at recruitment and spreading extremist ideology.

In May 2025, the Indian Airforce bombed the camp as part of Operation Sindoor in retaliation for the Pahalgam attack. In a viral video, Lashkar-e-Taiba commander Qaasim vowed to rebuild the destroyed Markaz camp in Muridke "even bigger" following its destruction. Standing amid the rubble, he admitted the camp's role in training numerous Mujahideen and Talaba, and declared that they would reconstruct the facility on a larger scale, reaffirming its importance in producing fighters who, according to him, had achieved “Faiz (Victory).”

=== Training camps ===
The LeT militant training camps are in a number of locations in Pakistan. These camps, which include the base camp, Markaz-e-Taiba in Muridke near Lahore (mentioned above) and the one near Manshera, are used to impart training to militants. In these camps, the following trainings are imparted:

- the 21-day religious course (Daura-e-Sufa)
- the 21-day basic combat course (Daura-e-Aam)
- the three-month advanced combat course (Daura-e-Khaas)

A 26/11 conspirator, Zabiuddin Ansari, alias Abu Jundal, was arrested in 2012 by Indian intelligence agencies and was reported to have disclosed that paragliding training was also included in the training curriculum of LeT cadres at is camps in Muzaffarabad in Pakistan-administered Azad Kashmir.

These camps have been tolerated since inception by Pakistan's Inter-Services Intelligence (ISI) agency because of their usefulness against India and in Afghanistan although as of 2006 they had been instructed not to mount any operations. A French anti-terrorism expert, Jean-Louis Bruguière, in his Some Things that I Wasn't Able to Say has stated that the regular Pakistani army officers trained the militants in the LeT militant training camps until recently. He reached this conclusion after interrogating a French militant, Willy Brigitte, who had been trained by the LeT and arrested in Australia in 2003.

==== Other training camps ====
In 1987, LeT established two militant training camps in Afghanistan. The first one was the Muaskar-e-Taiba at Jaji in Paktia Province and the second one was the Muaskar-e-Aqsa in Kunar Province. US intelligence analysts justify the extrajudicial detention of at least one Guantanamo detainee because they allege he attended a LeT training camp in Afghanistan. A memorandum summarising the factors for and against the continued detention of Bader Al Bakri Al Samiri asserts that he attended a LeT training camp.

Mariam Abou Zahab and Olivier Roy in their Islamist Networks: The Afghan-Pakistan Connection (London: C. Hurst & Co., 2004) mentioned three training camps in Pakistan-administered Azad Kashmir, the principal one is the Umm-al-Qura training camp at Muzaffarabad. Every month five hundred militants are trained in these militant camps. Muhammad Amir Rana in his A to Z of Jehadi Organizations in Pakistan (Lahore: Mashal, 2004) listed five training camps. Four of them, the Muaskar-e-Taiba, the Muaskar-e-Aqsa, the Muaskar Umm-al-Qura and the Muaskar Abdullah bin Masood are in Pakistan-administered Azad Kashmir and the Markaz Mohammed bin Qasim training camp is in Sanghar District of Sindh. Ten thousand militants had been trained in these militant camps up to 2004.

As of 2022, Lashkar-e-Taiba maintains multiple training camps in Afghanistan alongside Jaish-e-Mohammed which are used for both training and recruitment.

=== Funding ===
The government of Pakistan began to fund the LeT during the early 1990s and by around 1995 the funding had grown considerably. During this time the army and the ISI helped establish the LeT's military structure with the specific intent to use the militant group against Indians. The LeT also obtained funds through efforts of the MDI's Department of Finance.

Until 2002, the LeT collected funds through public fundraising events usually using charity boxes in shops. The group also received money through donations at MDI offices, through personal donations collected at public celebrations of an operative's martyrdom, and through its website. The LeT also collected donations from the Pakistani immigrant community in the Persian Gulf and United Kingdom, Islamic Non-Governmental Organizations, and Pakistani and Kashmiri businessmen. LeT operatives have also been apprehended in India, where they had been obtaining funds from sections of the Muslim community.

Although many of the funds collected went towards legitimate uses, e.g. factories and other businesses, a significant portion was dedicated to military activities. According to US intelligence, the LeT had a military budget of more than $5 million by 2009.

==== Drug and arms trade ====
The group also maintains a vast smuggling network, smuggling weapons and drugs from Afghanistan, through Pakistan, to India. These are likely brought from Lashkar-e-Taiyaba training camps in Afghanistan and stored in their Pakistani counterparts before being brought to India.

Lashkar-e-Taiba's drugs include heroin and methamphetamine while weapons include American-made M4 Carabine assault rifles among other drugs and weapons. Indian security forces have been seizing arms cashes almost daily. The investigations done by India's NIA (National Intelligence Agency) have exposed major drug operations conducted by Lashkar-e-Taiba.

This smuggling has only strengthened the group's relation's with the Indian D-Company.

==== Use of charity aid to fund relief operations ====
LeT assisted victims after the 2005 Kashmir earthquake. In many instances, they were the first on the scene, arriving before the army or other civilians.

A large amount of funds collected among the Pakistani expatriate community in Britain to aid victims of the earthquake were funnelled for the activities of LeT although the donors were unaware. About £5 million were collected, but more than half of the funds were directed towards LeT rather than towards relief efforts. Intelligence officials stated that some of the funds were used to prepare for an attack that would have detonated explosives on board transatlantic airflights. Other investigations also indicated the aid received for earthquake relief was used to increase fighter recruitment.

=== Notable incidents ===
- 1998 Wandhama massacre: 23 Kashmiri pandits were murdered on 25 January 1998.
- In March 2000, Lashkar-e-Taiba militants are claimed to have been involved in the Chittisinghpura massacre, where 35 Sikhs in the town of Chittisinghpura in Kashmir were killed. An 18-year-old male, who was arrested in December of that year, admitted in an interview with a New York Times correspondent to the involvement of the group and expressed no regret in perpetrating the anti-Sikh massacre. In a separate interview with the same correspondent, Hafiz Muhammad Saeed denied knowing the young man and dismissed any possible involvement of LeT. In 2010, the Lashkar-e-Taiba (LeT) associate David Headley, who was arrested in connection with the 2008 Mumbai attacks, reportedly confessed to the National Investigation Agency that the LeT carried out the Chittisinghpura massacre. He is said to have identified an LeT militant named Muzzamil as part of the group which carried out the killings apparently to create communal tension just before Clinton's visit.
- The LeT was also held responsible by the government for the 2000 terrorist attack on Red Fort, New Delhi. LeT confirmed its participation in the Red Fort attack.
- LeT claimed responsibility for an attack on the Srinagar Airport that left five Indians and six militants dead.
- The group claimed responsibility for an attack on Indian security forces along the border.
- The Indian government blamed LeT, in coordination with Jaish-e-Mohammed, for a 13 December 2001 assault on parliament in Delhi.
- 2002 Kaluchak massacre 31 killed 14 May 2002. Australian government attributed this massacre to Lashkar-e-Taiba when it designated it as a terrorist organisation.
- 2003 Nadimarg Massacre 24 Kashmiri pandits gunned down on the night of 23 March 2003.
- 2005 Delhi bombings: During Diwali, Lashkar-e-Taiba bombed crowded festive Delhi markets killing 60 civilians and maiming 527. It claimed the attack under the pseudonym of "Islami Inqilabi Mahaz" (Islamic Revolutionary Front) on a jihadist website.
- 2006 Varanasi bombings: Lashkar-e-Taiba was involved in serial blasts in Varanasi in the state of Uttar Pradesh. 37 people died and 89 were seriously injured.
- 2006 Doda massacre 34 Hindus were killed in Kashmir on 30 April 2006.
- 2006 Mumbai train bombings: The investigation launched by Indian forces and US officials have pointed to the involvement of Lashkar-e-Taiba in Mumbai serial blasts on 11 July 2006. The Mumbai serial blasts on 11 July claimed 211 lives and maimed about 407 people and seriously injured another 768.
- On 12 September 2006 the propaganda arm of the Lashkar-e-Taiba issued a fatwa against Pope Benedict XVI demanding that Muslims assassinate him for his controversial statements about Muhammad.
- On 16 September 2006, a top Lashkar-e-Taiba militant, Abu Saad, was killed by the troops of 9-Rashtriya Rifles in Nandi Marg forest in Kulgam. Saad belongs to Lahore in Pakistan and also oversaw LeT operations for the past three years in Gul Gulabhgash as the outfit's area commander. Apart from a large quantity of arms and ammunition, high denomination Indian and Pakistani currencies were also recovered from the slain militant.
- 2008 Mumbai attacks: Between 26 and 29 November 2008, Lashkar-e-Taiba was the primary suspect behind the terrorist attacks Mumbai, which included hostage taking, bombing, and mass shootout, but the outfit denied any part. The lone surviving gunman, Ajmal Amir Kasab, captured by Indian authorities admitted the attacks were planned and executed by the organisation, with the support from Pakistan Army and ISI. United States intelligence sources confirmed that their evidence suggested Lashkar-e-Taiba is behind the attacks. A July 2009 report from Pakistani investigators confirmed that LeT was behind the attack.
- On 7 December 2008, under pressure from USA and India, the Pakistan Army launched an operation against LeT and Jamat-ud-Dawa to arrest people suspected of 26/11 Mumbai attacks.
- In August 2009, LeT issued an ultimatum to impose Islamic dress code in all colleges in Jammu and Kashmir, sparking fresh fears in the tense region.
- In September and October 2009, Israeli and Indian intelligence agencies issued alerts warning that LeT was planning to attack Jewish religious places in Pune, India and other locations visited by Western and Israeli tourists in India. The gunmen who attacked the Mumbai headquarters of the Chabad Lubavitch movement during the November 2008 attacks were reportedly instructed that, "Every person you kill where you are is worth 50 of the ones killed elsewhere."
- News sources have reported that members of LeT were planning to attack the U.S. and Indian embassies in Dhaka, Bangladesh, on 26 November 2009, to coincide with the one-year anniversary of the November 2008 Mumbai attacks. At least seven men were arrested in connection to the plot, including a senior member of LeT.
- 2016 Uri Attack: According to India's National Investigation Agency, LeT also had a hand in the terrorist attack against an Indian Army brigade headquarters near the town of Uri.
- On 6 October 2016, three militants who attempted to storm an Indian Army camp in Handwara, located in the border district of Kupwara in Jammu and Kashmir, were killed by security forces. According to a senior official from India's Ministry of Home Affairs, the attackers were identified as members of LeT.

=== The Resistance Front (TRF) ===
The Resistance Front (TRF) is believed to be a proxy organisation associated with the Lashkar-e-Taiba. Established in 2019, TRF has been accused by the Indian government of engaging in various activities that threaten peace and security in the Jammu and Kashmir region. These activities include planning attacks on security forces and civilians, coordinating weapon transportation for proscribed terrorist groups, recruitment of militants, infiltration across borders, and smuggling of weapons and narcotics. In January 2023, TRF was banned under the Unlawful Activities (Prevention) Act (UAPA), and its commander, Sheikh Sajjad Gul, was designated as a terrorist. This action followed suspicions of TRF's involvement in the conspiracy to assassinate Kashmiri journalist Shujaat Bukhari in June 2018. In April 2025, TRF claimed responsibility for 2025 Pahalgam attack and they later retracted their claim of responsibility. On 11 November 2026, a CRPF checkpoint was attacked by two gunmen in Kulgam district. They opened fire and injured 3 CRPF personnel, one of them critically injured. Police attributed the attack to Mohammad Lateef Bhat, a local commander of the LeT and its offshoot The Resistance Front (TRF).

== Loss of leadership and key figures ==
1. David Headley (born Daood Sayed Gilani) - he performed surveillance missions in Mumbai to scout targets for the 2008 Mumbai attacks, and in Copenhagen, Denmark to help plot an attack against the Danish newspaper Jyllands-Posten, which had published cartoons of Muhammad. Arrested at O'Hare International Airport in Chicago in October 2009 while trying to leave for Pakistan to deliver Denmark footage. Currently serving 35 years in prison for his role in Mumbai and Copenhagen.
2. Tahawwur Hussain Rana - a Canadian citizen of Pakistan origin and former Pakistan Army captain, he provided material support to David Headley. Arrested in Chicago along with Headley, while trying to deliver Denmark footage. Sentenced to 14 years for providing material support for the 2008 Mumbai attacks in 2013, but released in 2020 due to COVID-19. Arrested again in May 2023 following extradition request to India. Extradited to India in April 2025 and currently in custody of National Investigation Agency for interrogation and sentencing.
3. Abrar, Intelligence Chief of LeT in Afghanistan was arrested and 8 other militants were killed by NDS in Nangarhar Province.
4. Abu Dujana, Chief of Lashkar-e-taiba in Kashmir Valley was killed by Indian security forces on 2 August 2017.
5. Abu Qasim, operations commander of the militant group, was killed in a joint operation by the Indian army and the special operations group of the Jammu and Kashmir police on 30 October 2017.
6. Junaid Mattoo, Lashkar-e-Taiba commander for Kulgam was killed in an encounter with security forces in Arvani.
7. Waseem Shah, responsible for recruiting fresh cadres and involved in many attacks on security forces in south Kashmir was killed on 14 October 2017.
8. Six top LeT commanders including Owaid, son of Abdul Rehman Makki and nephew of Zaki-ur-Rehman Lakhvi, wanted commanders Zargam and Mehmood, were killed on 18 November 2017. Mehmood was responsible for killing a constable on 27 September and two Garud commandos on 11 October.
9. Azam Cheema, main conspirator of the 2006 bombings on the Western Line of Mumbai Suburban Rail Network. Died of a heart attack on 28 February 2024.
10. Abdul Rehman Makki, the second-in-command of LeT, died of a heart attack in December 2024.
11. Faisal Nadeem, also known as Zia-ur-Rehman and Abu Qatal, was a top LeT commander linked to several major attacks in Jammu and Kashmir, including the 2023 Dhangri massacre and the 2024 Reasi bus attack. A close aide of Hafiz Saeed, he coordinated LeT operations across Kashmir and maintained militant networks in India. According to Indian sources, Nadeem had infiltrated the Jammu region in the early 2000s and again in 2005. He was reportedly shot dead by unidentified assailants in Jhelum, Pakistan, on 16 March 2025.
12. Shahid Kuttay, a top LeT commander, was among three terrorists killed in an encounter with Indian security forces in Shopian district of Jammu and Kashmir on 13 May 2025.
13. Abu Saifullah Khalid, also known as Razaullah Nizamani, the mastermind of the 2006 attack on the Rashtriya Swayamsevak Sangh headquarters in Nagpur, who headed the LeT’s operations from Nepal since 2000, was reportedly killed by three gunmen in Pakistan’s Sindh province on 18 May 2025. After Indian agencies dismantled Lashkar’s Nepal module, Khalid shifted to Pakistan, where he maintained coordination with senior LeT and Jamaat-ud-Dawah (JuD) leaders, including Yusuf Muzammil, Muzammil Iqbal Hashmi, and Muhammad Yusuf Taibi. In the years prior to his death, he was reportedly tasked with recruiting operatives and raising funds for LeT in Sindh’s Badin and Hyderabad districts.
14. Sheikh Yusuf Afridi, a key figure and close aide of Hafiz Saeed, shot dead by unidentified gunmen on 28 April 2026 in Khyber Pakhtunkhwa.
15. Qari Saeed Abdul Aziz, a senior commander of LeT. Died after collapsing at a mosque in Islamabad..
16. Hashim Moosa, a top LeT commander and the mastermind of the 2025 Pahalgam attack was killed in an encounter with security forces in Budgam, Jammu and Kashmir on 30 September 2026.
17. Mohammed Lateef Bhat, a top local LeT commander wanted for the 2026 Kulgam attack. He was also wanted for twin attacks in July 2026 that killed a J&K Police head constable in Anantnag and two non-local labourers from Chhattisgarh in Kulgam. He was killed in an encounter with security forces in Kulgam on 18 November 2026.

== External relationships ==
=== Support from Saudi Arabia ===
According to a secret December 2010 paper signed by the US secretary of state, "Saudi Arabia remains a critical financial support base for Al-Qaeda, the Taliban, LeT and other terrorist groups." LeT used a Saudi-based front company to fund its activities in 2005.

=== Role in India-Pakistan relations ===
LeT attacks have increased tensions in the already contentious relationship between India and Pakistan. Part of the LeT strategy may be to deflect the attention of Pakistan's military away from the tribal areas and towards its border with India. Attacks in India also aim to exacerbate tensions between India's Hindu and Muslim communities and help LeT recruitment strategies in India.

LeT cadres have also been arrested in different cities of India. On 27 May, a LeT militant was arrested from Hajipur in Gujarat. On 15 August 2001, a LeT militant was arrested from Bhatinda in Punjab. Mumbai police's interrogation of LeT operative, Abu Jundal revealed that LeT has planned 10 more terror attacks across India and he had agreed to participate in these attacks. A top US counter-terrorism official, Daniel Benjamin, in a news conference on 31 July 2012, told that LeT was a threat to the stability in South Asia urging Pakistan to take strong action against the terror outfit. Interrogation of Jundal revealed that LeT was planning to carry out aerial attacks on Indian cities and had trained 150 paragliders for this. He knew of these plans when he visited a huge bungalow in eastern Karachi where top LeT men, supervised by a man called Yakub were planning aerial and sea route attacks on India.

In August 2026, Rizwan Hanif, an LeT operative, publicly admitted while addressing his supporters in a speech that Indian agents killed more than 30 LeT operatives across various parts of Pakistan.

==== Inter-Services Intelligence involvement ====
The ISI have provided financial and material support to LeT. In 2010, Interpol issued warrants for the arrest of two serving officers in the Pakistan Army for alleged involvement in the 2008 Mumbai attacks. The LeT was also reported to have been directed by the ISI to widen its network in the Jammu region where a considerable section of the populace comprised Punjabis. The LeT has a large number of activists who hail from Indian Punjab and can thus effectively penetrate into Jammu society. A 13 December 2001 news report cited a LeT spokesperson as saying that LeT wanted to avoid a clash with the Pakistani government. He claimed a clash was possible because of the suddenly conflicting interests of the government and of the militant outfits active in Jammu and Kashmir even though the government had been an ardent supporter of Muslim freedom movements, particularly that of Kashmir.

Pakistan denies giving orders to LeT's activities. However, the Indian government and many non-governmental think-tanks allege that the Pakistani ISI is involved with the group. The situation with LeT causes considerable strain in Indo-Pakistani relations, which are already mired in suspicion and mutual distrust.

=== Role in Afghanistan ===
The LeT was created to participate in the Mujahideen conflict against the Najibullah regime in Afghanistan. In the process, the outfit developed deep linkages with Afghanistan and has several Afghan nationals in its cadre. The outfit had also cultivated links with the first Taliban regime in Afghanistan and also with Osama bin Laden and his al-Qaeda network. Lashkar-e-Taiba is also a Punjabi group, but its Ahl-e Hadith faith (Salafi) and close relationship with the Pakistani military establishment have contributed to a historically rocky relationship with Deobandi militant groups and other Anti-Salafi Taliban elements, thus, the Taliban has a less ideological interest in letting LeT operate from Afghan soil. Even while refraining from openly displaying these links, the LeT office in Muridke was reportedly used as a transit camp for third country recruits heading for Afghanistan.

Guantanamo detainee Khalid Bin Abdullah Mishal Thamer Al Hameydani's Combatant Status Review Tribunal said that he had received training via Lashkar-e-Taiba.

Lashkar-e-Taiba's directed attacks against Indian targets in Afghanistan. Three major attacks occurred against Indian government employees and private workers in Afghanistan.

The Combatant Status Review Tribunals of Taj Mohammed and Rafiq Bin Bashir Bin Jalud Al Hami, and the Administrative Review Board hearing of Abdullah Mujahid and Zia Ul Shah allege that they too were members or former members of Lashkar-e-Taiba.

After the Taliban's restoration in 2021, it cracked down on Salafi groups in Afghanistan due to the conflict with the Islamic State. Unlike the Deobandi group Jaish-e-Mohammed, despite claims of Taliban links, the LeT's ties to Salafism have led to evidence of a strengthened alliance with IS-KP, a sworn enemy of the Taliban.

=== Role in Nepal ===
At the seminar held in July 2025 titled "Terrorism in South Asia: Challenges to Regional Peace and Security", organised by the Nepal Institute for International Cooperation and Engagement in Kathmandu, Sunil Bahadur Thapa, Advisor to the President of Nepal, warned that groups like Lashkar-e-Taiba and Jaish-e-Mohammed, pose serious threats to India and could potentially use Nepal as a transit route.

=== Links with other militant groups ===
While the primary focus for the Lashkar is the operations in Indian Kashmir, it has frequently provided support to other international terrorist groups. Primary among these is the al-Qaeda Network in Afghanistan. LeT members also have been reported to have engaged in conflicts in the Philippines, Bosnia, the Middle East and Chechnya. There are also allegations that members of the Liberation Tigers of Tamil Eelam conducted arms transfers and made deals with LeT in the early 1990s.

==== Al-Qaeda ====
- The Lashkar is claimed to have operated a military camp in post–11 September Afghanistan, and extending support to the ousted Taliban regime. The outfit had claimed that it had assisted the Taliban militia and Osama bin Laden's al-Qaeda network in Afghanistan during November and December 2002 in their fight against the US-aided Northern Alliance.
- A leading al-Qaeda operative Abu Zubaydah, who became operational chief of al-Qaeda after the death of Mohammed Atef, was caught in a Lashkar safehouse at Faisalabad in Pakistan.
- A news report in the aftermath of 11 September attacks in the U.S. has indicated that the outfit provides individuals for the outer circle of bin Laden's personal security.
- Other notable al-Qaeda operatives said to have received instruction and training in LeT camps include David Hicks, Richard Reid and Dhiren Barot.

==== Jaish-e-Mohammed ====
News reports, citing security forces, said that the latter suspect that on 13 December 2001 attack on India's Parliament in New Delhi, a joint group from the LeT and the Jaish-e-Mohammed (JeM) were involved. The attack precipitated the 2001–2002 India–Pakistan standoff.

==== Hizb-ul-Mujahideen ====
The Lashkar is reported to have conducted several of its major operations in tandem with the Hizb-ul-Mujahideen.They conducted various operations together and it's believed that they still work together in Jammu and Kashmir.

==== Ties to Khalistan militants ====
In the aftermath of the 2008 Mumbai attacks, India submitted a list of 20 individuals to Pakistan, including known members of the Lashkar-e-Taiba (LeT) and Khalistani militant outfits such as the International Sikh Youth Federation (ISYF). Among them was ISYF chief Lakhbir Singh Rode, based in Lahore, wanted for arms smuggling and inciting communal violence. The ISYF, along with Babbar Khalsa International (BKI), had reportedly maintained ties with Pakistan’s Inter-Services Intelligence (ISI) and received training and logistical support from Islamist groups like LeT since the early 2000s.

Beginning in the mid-1990s, ISYF operatives are believed to have trained alongside LeT cadres, with both groups sharing facilities and resources in Pakistan. By 2005, Indian intelligence warned of renewed militancy, citing collaboration between ISYF, LeT, and ISI in training militants for infiltration and attacks in Punjab and Jammu & Kashmir. The ISYF is believed to have been the first Sikh militant group to establish contact with ideologues from Markaz-e-Dawat-ul-Irshad, the Salafist organisation that served as the parent body of Lashkar-e-Taiba (LeT).

==== Ties to attacks in the United States ====
- The Markaz campus at Muridke in Lahore, its headquarters, was used as a hide-out for both Ramzi Yousef, involved in the 1993 World Trade Center bombing, and Mir Aimal Kansi, convicted and executed for the January 1993 killing of two Central Intelligence Agency officers outside the agency's headquarters in Langley, Virginia.
- A group of men dubbed the Virginia Jihad Network attended LeT training camps and were convicted in 2006 of conspiring to provide material support to the LeT. The leader of the group, Ali al-Timimi, urged the men to attend the LeT camps and to "go abroad to join the mujahideen engaged in jihad in Afghanistan." The men also trained with weapons in Virginia.
- Two U.S. citizens, Syed Haris Ahmed and Ehsanul Sadequee were arrested in 2006 for attempting to join LeT. Ahmed travelled to Pakistan in July 2005 to attend a terrorist training camp and join LeT. The men also shot videos of U.S. landmarks in the Washington, D.C. area for potential terrorist attacks. They were convicted in Atlanta during the summer of 2009 for conspiring to provide material support to terrorists.
- U.S. citizen Ahmad Abousamra was indicted in November 2009 for providing material support to terrorists. He allegedly went to Pakistan in 2002 to join the Taliban and LeT, but failed. The F.B.I. issued a $50,000 reward for his capture on 3 October 2012.

=== Impact on Pakistani external relations ===
In 2015 the Pakistan Army ordered 12 Bell AH-Z Viper attack helicopters, with an option of 3 more to replace its ageing AH-1F Cobras and were to be delivered by 2017. Following cancellation of $300 million military aid to Pakistan by the US government in 2018, the helicopters were put into storage at Davis-Monthan AFB, Arizona. The reasoning for this cancellation by Trump was due Pakistan's support for groups like Lashkar-e-Tayyiba. In 2020 Pakistan considered ditching the Bell AH-Z Viper deal for either Turkish or Chinese helicopters. By 2022 Pakistan fully ditched this deal for Turkish T129 ATAK and Chinese Z-10ME Helicopters. The 12 Bell AH-Z Vipers which were meant for Pakistan, are now planned to be sold to Ukraine instead as of 2024.

In 2025 Germany turned down Pakistan’s request for AIP technology for its submarines due to its support for Lashkar-e-Taiba. Germany instead, sold this technology to India for the submarines of its own navy.

== See also ==
- Ghazwa-e-Hind
- Abdul Rauf Asghar
- Al-Qaeda
- All Parties Hurriyat Conference
- Burhan Wani
- Kashmir conflict
- Lascar
- List of designated terrorist groups
- List of organizations banned by the Government of India
- Afzal Guru
- Syed Ali Shah Geelani

== Bibliography ==
- Bacon, Tricia (2019), "Preventing the Next Lashkar-e-Tayyiba Attack", The Washington Quarterly, 42: 53–70, doi:10.1080/0163660X.2019.1594135, S2CID 159406934
- Davis, Anthony (2021), "Lashkar-e-Taiba" (PDF), Global Jihadist Terrorism, Edward Elgar Publishing, pp. 84–105
- Fair, C. Christine (2018), In Their Own Words: Understanding Lashkar-e-Tayyaba, Oxford University Press, ISBN 9780190062033
- Tankel, Stephen (2014), Storming the World Stage: The Story of Lashkar-e-Taiba, Oxford University Press, ISBN 978-0-19-023803-2
- Yasmin, Samina (2017), Jihad and Dawah: Evolving Narratives of Lashkar-e-Taiba and Jamat Ud Dawah, London: Hurst, ISBN 9781849047104
