= Sebastian Rotella =

American novelist

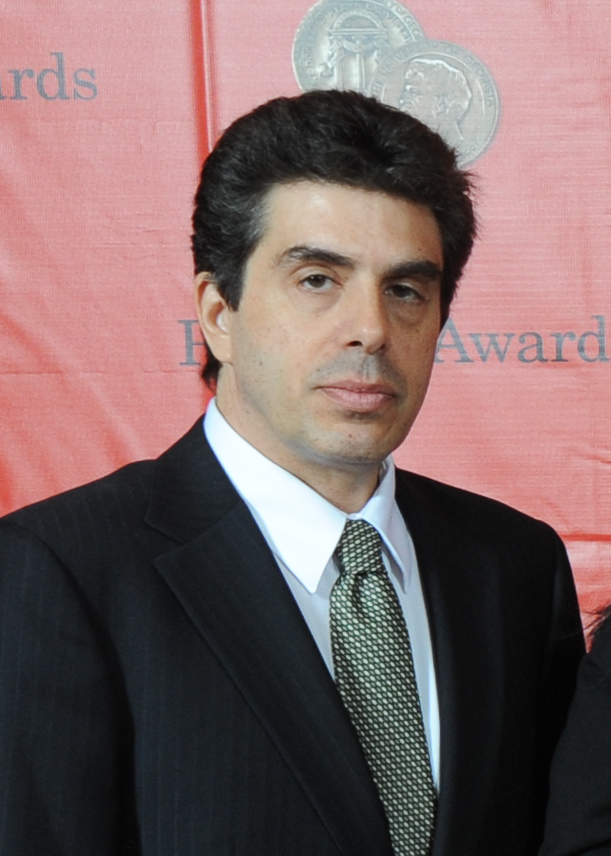
- Sebastian Rotella in May 2013
- Born: Chicago, Illinois, U.S.
- Education: University of Michigan
- Occupations: Journalist, novelist
- Writing career
- Period: 1992–present

Sebastian Rotella is an American foreign correspondent, investigative journalist, and novelist.

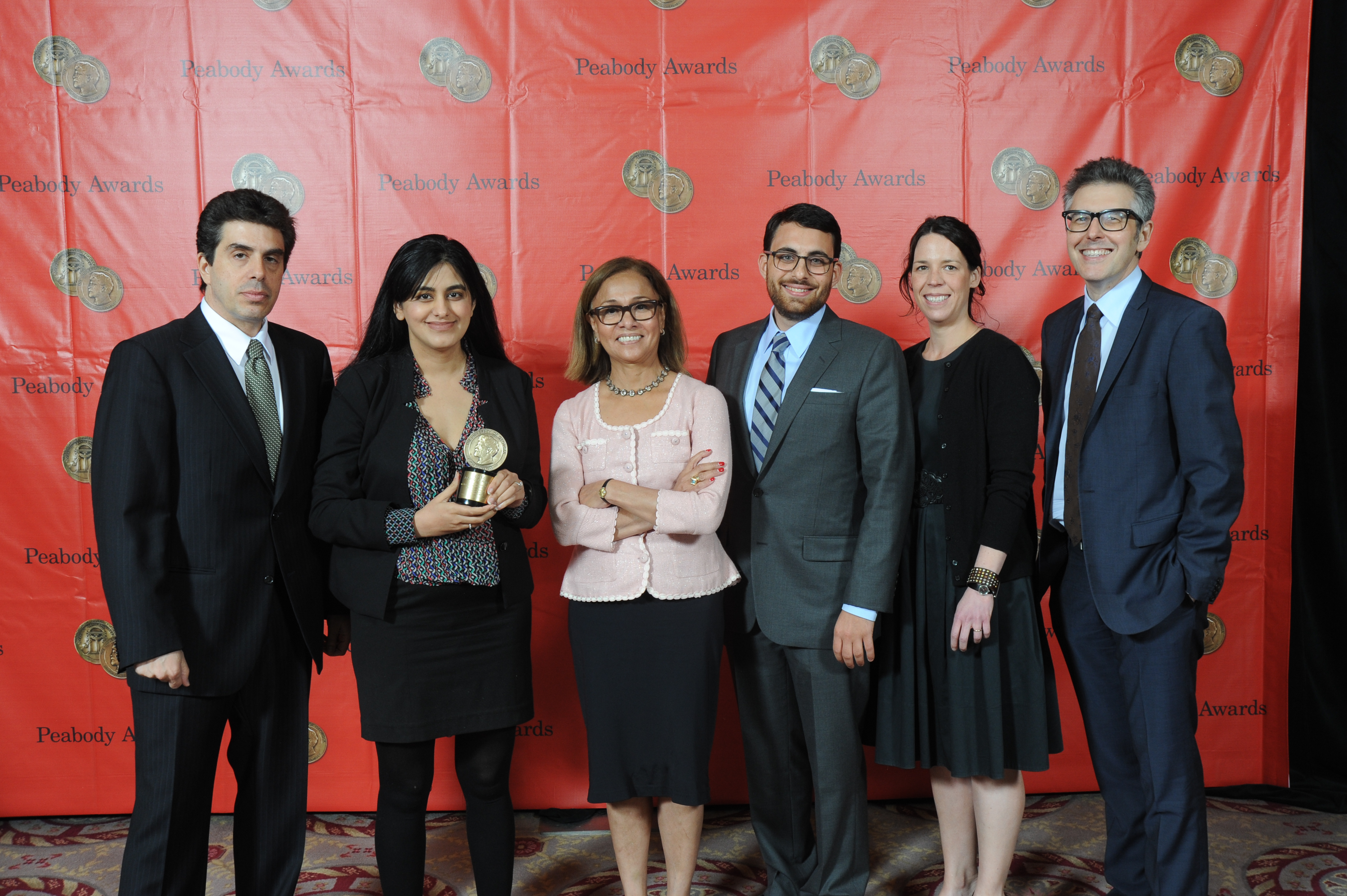
A Peabody Award for "What Happened at Dos Erres?", May 2013 Sebastian Rotella, Habiba Nosheen, Ana Arana, Brian Reed, Julie Snyder and Ira Glass

== Biography ==
Rotella was born in Chicago, Illinois, and graduated from the University of Michigan. While at the University of Michigan, he won four Hopwood Awards from 1982 to 1984. He worked for over twenty years as a reporter at the Los Angeles Times. The Overseas Press Club awarded his investigation of the 2008 Mumbai attacks the "Best Online Investigation of an International Issue or Event 2010" award. Rotella contributed as a reporter to "What Happened at Dos Erres", a documentary published as an episode of This American Life that won a Peabody Award in 2012. As a ProPublica employee, he was a co-producer and the primary contributing reporter of the 2016 Frontline episode "Terror in Europe".

Rotella's article "Children of the Border", published in the Los Angeles Times on April 3, 1993, served as a source for Bruce Springsteen's album The Ghost of Tom Joad.

Rotella speaks Spanish, French and Italian. He is the older brother of Carlo Rotella.

== Bibliography ==
=== Nonfiction works ===
- Twilight on the Line: Underworlds and Politics at the Mexican Border (1998)
- Pakistan and the Mumbai Attacks: The Untold Story, by Sebastian Rotella and Gary Dikeos (2013)
- Finding Oscar: Massacre, Memory, and Justice in Guatemala, by Ana Arana, Sebastian Rotella and Kevin Stillwell (2013)

=== Novels ===
- Triple Crossing (2012)
- The Convert's Song (2014)
- Rip Crew (2018)
