= Muridke =

Town in Punjab, Pakistan

Muridke مریدکے
- City
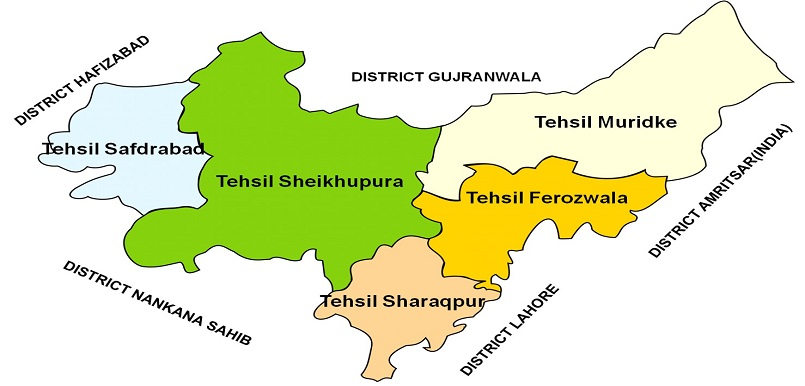
- Chand Bagh School ground at night

- Location within Punjab, Pakistan Location within Pakistan
- Coordinates: 31.802°N 74.255°E
- Country: Pakistan
- Province: Punjab
- Division: Lahore
- District: Sheikhupura

Government
  - Type: Municipal Corporation
  - Mayor: Vacant
  - Chief Officer: Sheriyar Khalid
- Elevation: 205 m (673 ft)

Population (2023 census)
  - City: 254,291
  - Rank: 37th in Pakistan
- Time zone: UTC+5 (PST)

Muridke (Punjabi / Urdu: مریدکے), is a city and headquarters of Muridke Tehsil of Sheikhupura District in Punjab, Pakistan. It is the 37th most populous city of Pakistan as well 25th of the province Punjab. Muridke is a commercial area situated near the city of Lahore, at an elevation of 205 m (675 ft).

== Geography ==
It is 215 meters above sea level, with the land around being largely flat. The area is largely agricultural and is serviced by nearby canals.

== Temperature ==
The average temperature is 23 °C. The hottest month is June, at 39 °C, and the coldest is January, at 7 °C. The average rainfall is 955 millimetres (37 in) per year. The wettest month is September, at 289 millimetres (11 in) of rainfall, and the driest is November, at 11 millimetres (0.5 in).

Murīdke

Climate chart (precipitation, max. and min. temperature)
J	F	M	A	M	J	J	A	S	O	N	D
34 17 5	49 20 9	44 25 12	57 34 17	15 43 23	63 40 24	137 32 26	226 30 24	289 29 23	16 29 18	11 26 11	14 20 6
- █ Average max. and min. temperatures in °C
- █ Precipitation totals in mm
Imperial conversion
J	F	M	A	M	J	J	A	S	O	N	D
1.3 63 41	1.9 68 48	1.7 77 54	2.2 93 63	0.6 109 73	2.5 104 75	5.4 90 79	8.9 86 75	11 84 73	0.6 84 64	0.4 79 52	0.6 68 43
- █ Average max. and min. temperatures in °F
- █ Precipitation totals in inches

== Demographics ==
Population

Historical population

Year	Pop.	±% p.a.
1961	6,757	—
1972	18,507	+9.59%
1981	35,419	+7.48%

Year	Pop.	±% p.a.
1998	111,951	+7.00%
2017	166,652	+2.12%
2023	254,291	+7.30%

According to 2023 census, Muridke had a population of 254,291. The city's population increased nearly ninefold between 1972 and 2017, from 18,507 to 166,652. Between 1998 and 2017, average annual growth was 2.1%, slightly lower than the national average of 2.4%.

Languages

Languages of Muridke city (2023)
1. Punjabi (93.3%)
2. Urdu (5.70%)
3. Others (1.00%)

== Education ==
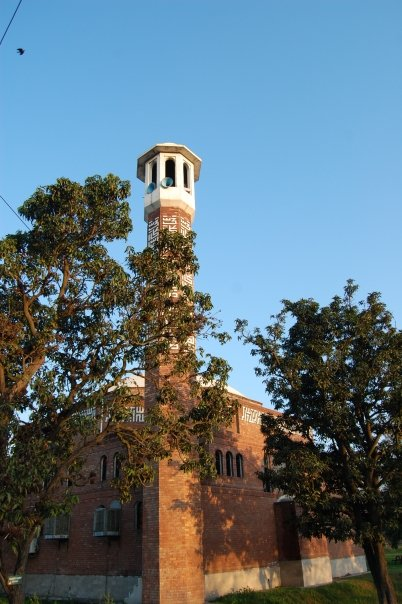
Chand Bagh School in Muridke, Pakistan

Chand Bagh School is a private boarding school for boys in Muridke. It is situated on the Muridke-Sheikhupura Road. It follows the Cambridge International Examination system.

== Landmarks ==
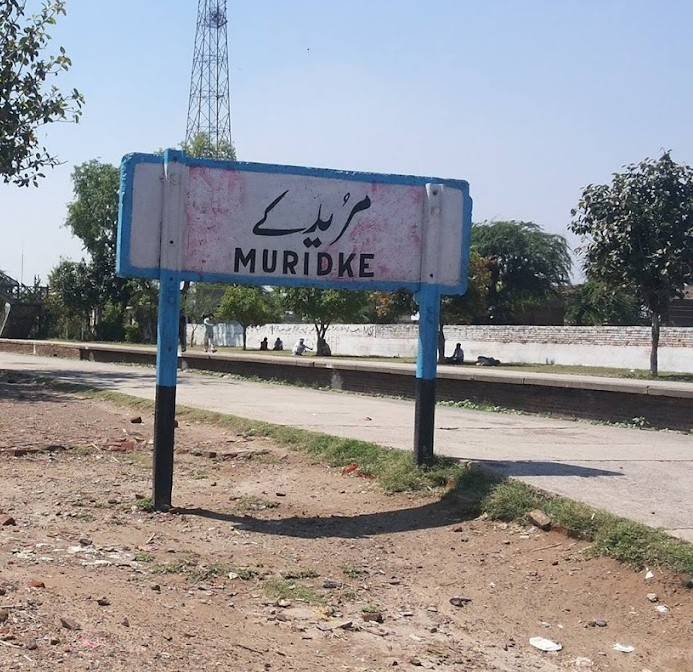
Muridke railway station

=== Markaz-e-Taiba ===
Muridke is known for being home to the Markaz-e-Taiba, the headquarters of Markaz Dawa wal Irshad (MDI) or Jamaat-ud-Dawa (JuD), (Note: The organisation took the name Jamaat-ud-Dawa in 2002 after facing a ban in Pakistan. Considerable confusion persists regarding the relationship between the various organisations. According to journalist and author Arif Jamal, Jamaat-ud-Dawa is the central organisation and Lashkar-e-Taiba is just its India-facing branch.) the parent organisation of the militant group Lashkar-e-Taiba (LeT), located in the suburb of Nangal Sahdan. The Markaz is a large 200-acre complex that has a range of infrastructure established by Hafiz Muhammad Saeed in 1990. Osama bin Laden, the former leader of Al-Qaeda, is believed to have contributed approximately PKR 10 million (roughly USD 100,000 at the time) towards the development of the complex. The complex includes the Umm al-Qura Mosque, a madrasa, a religious preaching centre, residential quarters, a school, a hospital, a market, a garment factory, an iron factory, a woodwork factory, a stable, a swimming pool, a fishfarm, agricultural tracts and various administrative buildings. While it presents itself as a religious and educational institution, multiple international intelligence assessments and security reports have identified it as a hub for indoctrination, militant training and terrorist recruitment. In 2009, following the Mumbai attacks, the Punjab government took over the complex, and JuD continued to operate from there. The federal and provincial governments in Pakistan continued to allocate funds to the organisation.

The complex was targeted in an airstrike conducted by the Indian Air Force as part of Operation Sindoor on the night between on 7 May 2025. The Government of Pakistan has said that the complex is a civilian facility run by the Government. The Diplomat magazine said that Amir Hamza, a co-founder of LeT, gave a Friday sermon at the Markaz in March, and a leader of Pakistan Markazi Muslim League, an affiliate of JuD/LeT, was seen telling a gathering just a few weeks earlier that the "jihad" would continue. Several high-profile attackers, including Ajmal Kasab and David Headley underwent training at these facilities.

== Notable people ==
- Iqbal Masih, former child slave and later activist
- Jaffar Nazir, first-class cricketer
- Bilawal Bhatti, international cricketer
- Imran Nazir, international cricketer
