= Pradeep Guha =

Indian media personality

- Died: 21 August 2021; Mumbai, India
- Education: Don Bosco High School, Matunga; St. Xavier's College, Mumbai (BA)
- Occupations: Media personality, advertising professional and film producer
- Spouse: Papia Guha
- Children: 1

Pradeep Guha, also known as PG (died 21 August 2021) was an Indian media personality, advertising professional and film producer. He is best known for his work at Bennett, Coleman and Company (BCCL), the publisher of The Times of India, where he served for almost three decades (1976-2005) and transformed the flagship newspaper and magazine brands such as Filmfare and Femina. He also served as CEO of Zee Entertainment Enterprises Ltd, and managing director of 9X Media Private Limited. He was credited with introducing several innovative practices in the Indian media industry. He was also known for producing films such as Fiza (2000) and Phir Kabhi (2008).

== Early life ==
Pradeep Guha was an alumnus of St. Xavier's College in Mumbai, where he studied BA in economics. He went to school at Don Bosco in Mumbai.

== Career ==
Pradeep Guha started his career at The Times Group, where he worked for almost three decades and served as the president of the company. He later joined Zee Entertainment as CEO for three years.

He was the area director and VP of Asia Pacific of the International Advertising Association from 2008 to 2013. He was the managing director of Culture Company during the period 2008–2010. From 2005 to 2009, he was working as the CEO of Zee Entertainment Enterprises and he was the president of Bennett, Coleman and Co (Times Group) from 1986 – 2005.

When he took over as managing director of 9X Media in March 2009, the company was a loss making company. He sold the entire loss-making area of the network Hindi entertainment channel, 9X, to Zee Entertainment. He then turned his focus to the music channel 9XM and in just four years, he turned the company into a profit-making Rs 200-crore network. He launched four more new music channels at both national and international levels named 9XO (international music), 9X Jalwa (all-time Bollywood hits), 9X Tashan (Punjabi) and 9X Jhakaas (Marathi).

He has served on the boards of Raymond Ltd, Puravankara Projects Ltd and Whistling Woods International. He had served as the president of The Indian Newspaper Society, chairman of the National Readership Studies Council and president of the Advertising Club Bombay. Guha was the first chairman of the Broadcast Audience Research Council and was elected as the chairman of the Asian Federation of Advertising Associations.

Guha has also contributed to liberal journalism and to setting up the Centre of Education and Documentation (CED) in Mumbai, a news clipping library that was used by hundreds of students and researchers before the internet and Google made it irrelevant.

== Filmography ==
- Fiza (2000)
- Phir Kabhi (2008)

== Death ==
He was suffering from cancer and receiving treatment for a few years before dying on 21 August 2021, at the Kokilaben Dhirubhai Ambani Hospital in Mumbai. His death was announced by his wife Papia Guha and son Sanket Guha in a statement issued to the media. At the time of his death, he was 70 years old.

=== Reaction ===
Pradeep Guha's death was condoled by many in the film and media industry, including Manoj Bajpayee, Subhash Ghai and Adnan Sami, among other film industry figures, shared their condolences on social media upon news of Pradeep Guha's death. Priyanka Chopra also shared a heartfelt note on Instagram, praising Guha's contributions to her journey in Bollywood. Vineet Jain, MD of Times Group and Subhash Chandra, chairman emeritus of ZEE and chairman of Essel Group also paid condolence to him.

== Commemoration and legacy ==
In 2022, a book titled "Pradeep Guha The Legend I Know" was launched on 6 June 2022, which was Pradeep Guha's 70th birthday. The book carried short but eloquent write-ups focusing on the memories of interactions between Guha and celebrities and head honchos from media, advertising and cinema.

In 2022, the Brihanmumbai Municipal Corporation, Mumbai's governing civil body named a road after Guha. The signboard saying "Pradeep Guha Chowk" was placed right below the window of the room which was his cabin at the Times of India.

The Times of India Group has instituted the Pradeep Guha Trophy for the category of Young Emvie of the Year, in his honour.
