= Swaalina =

Finnish actress and singer in India (born 1995)

- Born: Halina Kuchey; 1 July 1995 (age 31)
- Known for: Actress, singer, model
- Notable work: Prada; Viah; Firse Machayenge; Khatam Hue Waande
- Spouse: Emiway Bantai (m. 2025)

Halina Kuchey (born 1 July 1995), known by her stage name Swaalina, is a Finnish actress, singer and model in India. She has starred in numerous Punjabi and Hindi music videos such as "Prada" by Jass Manak and "Firse Machayenge" by Emiway Bantai. She was also seen in the 2022 action film Shooter.

== Early life and education ==
Kuchey is from an Afghan family who moved to Ylöjärvi, Finland, when she was three years old. She was the youngest in the family. She attended secondary and high school in Tampere, where she got involved in theatre. She moved to Mumbai, India, at the age of 19, hoping to pursue a career in Bollywood.

== Career ==
Early in her career, Kuchey appeared in more than a hundred television commercials for brands such as Tata Tea, Snapdeal, and Nescafé.

=== Music videos ===
One of her first music videos was for the Hindi song "Ik Kahani" (2017).

Her first hit music video as Swaalina was "Prada" with Punjabi singer Jass Manak, released in May 2018. The song climbed the Billboard charts and by February 2020, and the video had 550 million views on YouTube alone. Her other music videos with Manak include "Suit Punjabi" and "Billian Billian".

Another hit music video was "Firse Machayenge" by rapper Emiway Bantai, which was the 7th most-watched YouTube video in 2020, with 315 million views by the end of the year. In 2023, they appeared together in the music video for "Kudi".

Other music videos include "Thaa Karke" by B Mohit featuring Karan Aujla and Swaalina, which was filmed before the COVID-19 lockdown and released in September 2020.

In 2026, Swaalina wrote the track, "Mumbai Sapno Ka Samandar", alongside Emiway Bantai, from the soundtrack of the film, Prahaar: The Untold Story of Ujjwal Nikam.

=== Film ===
Swaalina's movie credits include the female lead role in the action film Shooter, with Jayy Randhawa playing the Punjabi gangster Sukha Khalon. According to Swaalina, she studied Punjabi day and night for 15 days in order to get the part, despite not speaking the language previously.

The film was made in Punjab, India, making it a Pollywood film. Originally scheduled for release in 2020, it was banned by the premier of the Punjab, and then in Haryana; the reason given was that the film was feared to glorify violence, even though the film's main message was to condemn it.

== Personal life ==
Swaalina is married to hip-hop artist Emiway Bantai. Their wedding photos were shared on Instagram on 24 January 2025. Fluent in Finnish and English, she is learning Hindi, Punjabi, and Urdu.
