= KV Dhillon =

Indian music and film producer (born 1991)

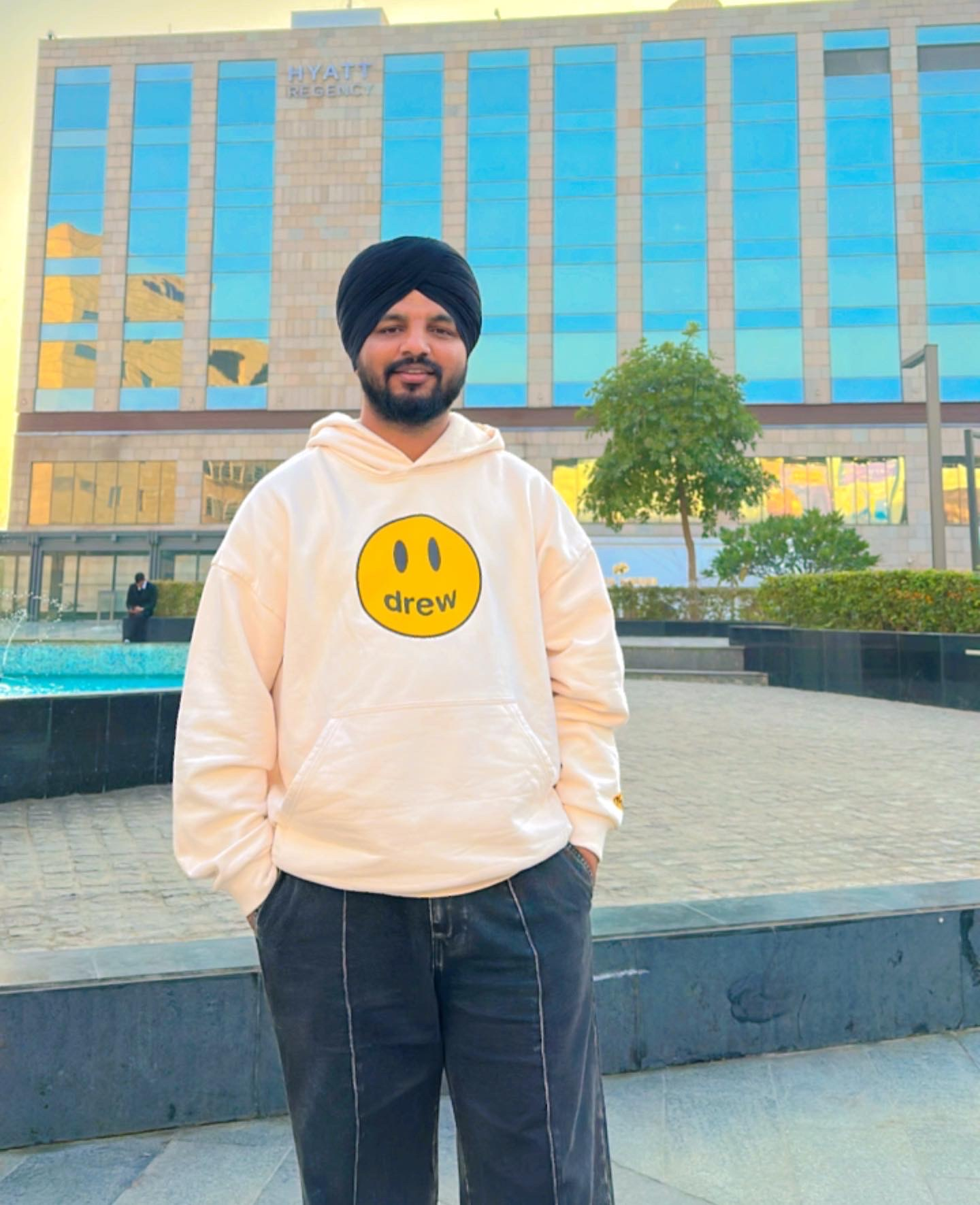
- KV Dhillon at Hyatt Regency, Chandigarh
- Born: KV Dhillon; Hanumangarh, Rajasthan, India
- Occupations: Film producer; music producer
- Years active: 2016–present
- Title: Chairman and managing director of Geet MP3

KV Dhillon is an Indian music and film producer, and owner of Geet MP3. He has produced films such as Sikander 2 (2019), Shooter (2020), Jatt Brothers (2022) and Lover (2022).

== Career ==
Dhillon is the owner of Punjabi music company Geet MP3 and clothing brand Slay King. He started his career by releasing the song "Yaar Beli" on Geet MP3 in 2016. After this, he produced various Punjabi songs such as "Lehanga", "Prada", "Nira Ishq", "Mil Lo Na", "Phulkari", "Billian Billian", "Suit Punjabi", "Jhanjra" and "Splendor". In 2019 he produced the film Sikander 2. In 2022 he produced the films Shooter, Jatt Brothers and Lover.

== Filmography ==
Year	Movie	Starring	Producer	Notes
2019	Sikander 2	Guri, Kartar Cheema	Yes	
2021	Kaka Pradhan	Vadda Grewal, Prince Bhullar	Yes	
2022	Shooter	Jayy Randhawa	Yes	
2022	Jatt Brothers	Guri, Jass Manak	Yes	
2022	Lover	Guri	Yes	
2022	Chobbar	Jayy Randhawa	Yes	
2023	Tufang	Guri	Yes	
2024	Oye Bhole Oye	Jagjeet Sandhu	Yes	
2025	Majhail	Dev Kharoud	Yes	
2025	Illti	Jagjeet Sandhu	Yes	
2025	Gangland: The City of Crime	Sippy Gill, Nishawn Bhullar	Yes	
2026	Oye Bhole Oye 2	Jagjeet Sandhu	Yes	
