= Mukerjea =

Mukerjea is a Bengali surname. It is a variant of Mukherjee. Notable people with the surname include:

- Indrani Mukerjea (born 1972), Indian HR consultant and media executive
- Jaidip Mukerjea (born 1942), Indian tennis player
- Peter Mukerjea (born 1954), Indian television executive, husband of Indrani
