= Dark Chocolate (film) =

- Official movie poster
- Directed by: Agnidev Chatterjee
- Based on: Sheena Bora murder case
- Starring: Mahima Chaudhry; Riya Sen; Mumtaz Sorcar; Shataf Figar
- Music by: Shubhayu
- Release date: 2 September 2016
- Running time: 92 minutes
- Country: India
- Languages: Bengali; Hindi

Dark Chocolate is a 2016 Indian Bengali crime thriller film directed by Agnidev Chatterjee and made under Macneill Engineering studio.

The film is an adaption of the real life murder of Sheena Bora, daughter of media barons Indrani Mukherjea and Peter Mukherjea. Bollywood actress Mahima Chaudhry made her debut in a Bengali film and played the role of Ishani Banerjee, a character based on murder accused Indrani Mukherjea. Riya Sen plays the part of Rina Bardhan, a role inspired by the life of Sheena Bora. Media baron Peter Mukherjea is portrayed by Sudeep Mukherjee.

== Cast ==
- Mahima Chaudhry as Ishani Banerjee
- Riya Sen as Rina Bardhan/ young Ishani
- Mumtaz Sorcar as Payal Mukherjee
- Indrashis Roy as Abhishekh Chatterjee, Police Investigating Officer
- Sudip Mukherjee as Victor Banerjee, Ishani's husband
- Kaushik Sen as Goutam Das
- Shataf Figar as Shadab Kapoor
- Rajesh Sharma as Ramcharan, driver
- Rick Basu as Lio, Reena's brother
- Sumomto Mukhopadhyay as Ishani's step-father
- Joy Bodlani as Police Commissioner
- Supriya Talukdar as Ishani's mother
- Parijat Chakraborty as Banerjee's family friend
- Debopriyo Mukherjee as Rohit Banerjee, Victor's son
- Christal as Niti
- Manasi Sengupta as Manashi
- Lubna Mahmood as Elina
- Gourav Churiwal as Vikram Singha
- Nityodhon Ganguly as hotel receptionist
- Romit Roy as Debashis
- Saurav Ghosh as Bibhas
- Saubhik Majumdar as TV anchor
- Tathagato Banerjee as contract killer
- Suparna Dey as contract killer's wife
- Shibnath Acharya as man in the bar
