= Bade and Chote =

Fictional characters

- Bade and Chote
- First appearance: 2007

Bade and Chote are a pair of animated characters that appear on interstitial programming segments titled Bakwaas Bandh Kar ["Stop the Nonsense"] on 9XM, the Indian music and movie channel.

== Appearance and characteristics ==
Bade and Chote are shapeless alien-type characters who inhabit a non-specific Indian city. The characters are college buddies and spend their time in frivolous and humorous conversation about nothing. Their bizarre appearance and behavior was designed to provide an indication of the personality of 9XM at its launch as humorous and irreverent.

== Media ==
In August 2010, 9XM entered into a licensing agreement to license the images of Bade and Chote and other animated characters for use in children's clothing and accessories. 9XM has also created online content on Facebook involving the characters. "Be a Star Papparazzi" gives players the opportunity to try to capture a virtual photo of Bollywood star Shahrukh Khan while trying to avoid the antics of Bade and Chote. The game offers a related "Can you think like Chote?" in which players are challenged to complete jokes in the style used on Bakwaas Bandh Kar. The characters also have their own Twitter accounts, tweeting about popular culture and entertainment. The daily turnover of consumer interaction on these platforms reflects their popularity
