= Shooter (2022 film) =

Punjabi-language action film

- Directed by: Dilsher Singh; Khushpal Singh
- Produced by: KV Dhillon
- Starring: Jayy Randhawa; Swaalina; Vada Grewal
- Production companies: Geet MP3
- Release date: 14 January 2022
- Running time: 143 min
- Country: India
- Language: Punjabi

Shooter, originally titled as Sukha Kahlon is a 2022 Indian Punjabi-language action film directed by Dilsher Singh and Khushpal Singh. It is based on the life of Indian gangster Sukha Kahlon.

== Release ==
The film was scheduled to be released on 21 February 2020; however, it was banned in Punjab by Capt. Amarinder Singh, then Chief Minister of Punjab, for allegedly promoting violence. Also, the film was banned in Haryana on 21 August 2021, again for allegedly promoting violence. Banning of the film got divided opinions from Punjabi cinema. It was finally released theatrically on 14 January 2022.

=== Home Media Release ===
The movie was released on the Chaupal Ott platform.

== Soundtrack ==
Shooter

Soundtrack album by Jass Manak, Guri, Veet Baljit, Karaj Randhawa
- Genre: Feature film soundtrack
- Label: Geet MP3
- Producer: KV Dhillon

Track listing
| No. | Title | Singer(s) | Length |
|---|---|---|---|
| 1. | "Shoot Da Order" | Jass Manak, Jagpal Sandhu | 3:25 |
| 2. | "Maa" | Veet Baljit | 1:50 |
| 3. | "Gal Sun" | Jass Manak | 3:06 |
| 4. | "Hitler" | Guri | 3:42 |

== See also ==
- List of films banned in India
