= Emiway Bantai =

Indian hip-hop artist (born 1995)

- Born: Bilal Shaikh; 13 November 1995 (age 31); Bangalore, India
- Origin: Mumbai, India
- Genres: Indian hip hop; Hip hop; Gully rap; Drill; Trap; R&B; Pop rap
- Occupations: Rapper; Songwriter; Producer; Composer; Music Engineer
- Years active: 2013-present
- Labels: Bantai Records; Geet MP3; Namoh Studios; T-Series; Sony Music India; Zee Music Company
- Spouse: Swaalina (m. 2025)
- Website: https://bantai.in

Emiway Bantai

YouTube information
- Channel: Emiway Bantai
- Years active: 2013-present
- Genres: Rap, Hip hop
- Subscribers: 22.3 million
- Views: 4.57 billion

Bilal Shaikh (born 13 November 1995), best known by his stage name Emiway Bantai, is an Indian hip-hop artist, rapper and producer. As an independent artist, he has built a fan base entirely through social media, releasing popular videos for singles such as "Machayenge" (2019) and "Firse Machayenge" (2020) to reach a global audience. Emiway has collaborated with American rappers such as Macklemore, Snoop Dogg and Token. He is also known for his involvements in major feuds with rappers like Raftaar, Divine, MC Stan, and Krsna.

== Early life and education ==
Mohammed Bilal Shaikh was born in 1995 in Bengaluru, India. Around the age of three, he moved with his father to Mumbai. He grew up in Antop Hill, where he learned Mumbai slang.

In 2010, his classmates introduced him to his first hip-hop track, "Not Afraid" by Eminem. After dropping out from class 12, he became depressed and did not complete school. To earn money, Shaikh worked as a helper at the Hard Rock Cafe.

== Career ==
=== 2013-2017: Early years ===
Shaikh came up with the stage name Emiway by combining the names of two of his idols; Eminem and Lil Wayne. Bantai is Mumbai slang for friend, brother, or "bro".

In 2013, at the age of 18, Emiway Bantai released his debut track "Glint Lock (ft. Minta)", mostly in English. The song failed to gain much notice. Emiway then followed his father's advice and switched to rapping in Hindi. In 2015, his single "Aur Bantai" became a breakthrough hit. Within five years, the video for "Aur Bantai" had more than 6 million views on YouTube. He appeared on the reality show India's Got Talent, to perform the song, but was rejected by the judges including filmmaker Karan Johar. In the years since, he has established himself as a multilingual rapper who spits bars in Hindi, English, Marathi, and Tamil.

=== 2018: First rap feud ===
His high-profile feud with rapper Raftaar took place over five diss tracks, starting in 2018 when Emiway was 22 years old. In 2017, Emiway and Raftaar had collaborated on "#Sadak". In the following year, in September, Raftaar appeared on a podcast with Raaj Jones, where he questioned if fellow rapper Emiway Bantai was generating enough revenue from hip-hop. Emiway took offense and shot back with the track "Samajh Mein Aaya Kya?" ("Do You Understand?"), in which he defends himself as an independent artist. Raftaar responded with his own track, "Sheikh Chilli", where he called out Emiway for taking the statement out of context, while Emiway responded again with "Giraftaar". Raftaar responded with "Awein Hai". Emiway then responded with the final diss "Khatam" ("The End").

=== 2019-2021: Mainstream popularity ===
By 2019, Rolling Stone India noted that Emiway was "one of the very few music artists in India that [had] catapulted themselves into stardom solely with the use of social media". According to Platform magazine, Emiway had "cracked the code to building a die-hard fandom entirely online" as an independent artist. In addition, Emiway changed his look significantly, sporting a beard and shades which became his trademark.

In 2019, Emiway Bantai went viral with the song "Machayenge" on TikTok and other platforms. He wrote the track after three successive releases of angst-filled rap songs. Producer Tony James composed the dance track. Emiway released "Boht Hard" featuring Thoratt in the same year, which also went viral.

Emiway Bantai was featured in the music video of the song "Asli Hip-Hop" from the movie Gully Boy starring Ranveer Singh and directed by Zoya Akhtar, released in 2019. Emiway and other local rappers from Mumbai were also consultants on the script. The film helped to bring desi hip-hop to a mass audience. Other popular tracks by Emiway in 2019 included "Dhyan De" and "Skrrt Karenge". In 2019, Emiway released "Freeverse Feast (Daawat)", where he claimed that "he's the only rapper representing India worldwide".

On Valentine's Day in 2020, Emiway Bantai released "Firse Machayenge". Co-starring Swaalina and shot by Nepal-born filmmaker Nishan Bujel, the video garnered 100 million views within its first 50 days. In June 2020, Emiway released "Firse Machayenge Remix", a collaboration with American hip-hop artist Macklemore. "Firse Machayenge" went on to become one of the top 10 YouTube music videos in India in 2020, peaking at No. 7 with 315 million views.

In 2020, Emiway released the song "Khatam Korona", urging people to stay home during the COVID-19 pandemic. The song quickly went viral, amassing 4 million views on YouTube by 2 April 2020. He also featured on the song "New World" by Lexz Pryde alongside American rapper Snoop Dogg, which was a remix of Pryde's 2016 single "Motivate".

After 8 years of releasing singles and EPs, Emiway finally released his debut album, Malum Hai Na in 2021. The album features songs such as "Machayenge 3", "My Time", "Hai Tu Kaun" and "Jawab De", an intense, introspective rap about fighting his own personal demons. Emiway was featured as the cover artist for the October edition of Rolling Stone India.

=== 2021: Bantai Records ===
In 2021, Emiway started his own independent label, Bantai Records. Emiway told Rolling Stone India that Bantai Records gave artists "complete freedom to decide what they want to release, when and where". In its first year, artists with the label included Hellac, Loka, Meme Machine, Minta, Swaalina, Thoratt, Tony James, and Young Galib. In an interview with The Indian Express, Emiway described the label as "a record label, where we give artistes complete creative freedom to make the music they like to make".

=== 2022-present: Feud with Krsna, King of the Streets and other projects ===
After the release of some tracks containing subliminal disses on each other, the beef between Krsna and Emiway escalated in 2022, when Emiway released "Chusamba", in response to which Krsna released "Lil Bunty". Emiway again responded with "KR L$DA Sign", and Krsna released "Machayenge 4", referring to Emiway's popular song series. Emiway retorted with his own version, "Machayenge 4", and was met with widespread backlash, which prompted him to delete the track for a while after its original release. In 2023, Emiway released his third studio album, King of the Streets. The longest of the 17 tracks on the album, "King of Indian Hip Hop", had dropped the week prior, with diss bars targeting MC Stan and an implied subliminal diss against Badshah. Four other tracks, including "Company" and "King of Indian Hip-Hop", had received music videos prior to the album's release. Calling the album "refreshing", a review in The Indian Music Diaries called out "Chhod Dala", "Rule No. 123", and "Survive" as "standouts" from Emiway's usual style.

In 2023, Emiway became the only Indian hip-hop artist to be featured on Times Square twice. He was featured on the billboard in 2020 for his debut album Malum Hai Na and for a second time in 2023 for his album King Of The Streets.

Emiway also embroiled in a feud with rapper King due to the latter's song "F*ck What They Say" containing subtle jabs at the rapper. Emiway responded with a track titled, "Roko 2MG". King further released two tracks exclusively on Instagram and Emiway responded with "Meet the Instagram Yapper" and "Dependent Kauve".

In 2025, Emiway released the single, "Badshah", from his EP, Bajis. He further released four more tracks from the EP, including "Tribute to Sidhu Moose Wala". In an interview with Firstpost, he revealed that old Hindi film songs featuring actor Shah Rukh Khan were the main inspiration behind the EP's sound. In 2025, Emiway also released his fifth studio album From The Streets To The Streams, releasing 10 music videos from the album.

In 2026, Emiway collaborated with American rapper Token for the song "#SADAK 2.0". He further released his eighth EP, CNSTNCY. In the wake of 2026 Delhi Jantar Mantar protests, Emiway released the protest anthem "Bolra Hai Sadak".

Emiway made his debut in Bollywood with the song "Choozay" from the soundtrack of the Ayushmann Khurrana-starrer Udta Teer. He further featured on the single, "Mumbai Sapno Ka Samandar", alongside Sunidhi Chauhan, from the soundtrack of the Rajkummar Rao-starrer Prahaar: The Untold Story of Ujjwal Nikam.

== Personal life ==
Emiway Bantai married actor and singer Swaalina, sharing pictures from their private wedding ceremony on Instagram in January 2025. They had worked together famously on "Firse Machayenge" in 2020 and many other music videos.

== Awards ==
- People's Choice Award (2017-19) for Best Hip-Hop Artist for three consecutive years at the Radio City Freedom Awards.
- MTV Europe Music Awards for Best India Act in 2019.
- Indian Independent Music Awards (2022) for Best Classical Song - "Machayenge"

== Filmography ==
=== Movies ===
- Gully Boy (2019) as himself

=== Documentaries ===
- The Mind Behind (2019)
- The Story Behind Machayenge (2020)

=== Television ===
- India's Got Talent (2018) as Contestant
- Red Bull Spotlight (2021) as Judge
- Bigg Boss OTT (2023) as Guest

== Discography ==
=== Albums ===
Year	Album	Tracks	Artist	Producer(s)
2021	Malum Hai Na	Malum Hai Na (Intro); Momma; Chalte Firte; Freeverse Feast 2; My Time; Machayenge 3; Always On Top; Hai Tu Kaun; Kyu Jane De; Gum Ko Vata; Jawab De; Bantai Ki Public; Aisa Kuch Shot Nahi Hai (Remix); Believe (Outro)	Emiway Bantai	Meme Machine; Tony James; Jaykll; AAKASH; Young Taylor; Flamboy; Ryini Beats
2022	8 Saal	Mera (Intro); Mera; 8 Saal; Kaha Par Hun; Pain; Focus; Haq Hai; Life Is Good; Choco	Emiway Bantai	Lexnour; Pendo46; Abyss Prod; Emiway Bantai; Memax; Cheap Thrills
2023	King Of The Streets	KOTS (Prelude); KOTS (Intro); Chhod Dala; Jhakas; Meherbani; Company; Beta Karta Rap; Kya Din The Woh; Roots; Scene Change; Rule no.123; Waqt Ke Sath (Interlude); Survive (ft. VBreak); KOTS (Freestyle); Kya Bolti Public (ft. Young Galib); Classy Chapri; King of Indian Hip Hop	Emiway Bantai	Pendo46; Lexnour; JustDan Beats; llogans; Enigma Beats; Babz Beats; Robert Tar; 9thaGod; Citron Beatz; Memax; Sinato Beats; Zero Beatz; Xistence; Bxl Grapes; Gore Ocean; nobuddy; kylo beats; MYK Beats
2024	Wholeheartedly	Aksar Unplugged (ft. The Rish); Bolna Tu Bantai; Tu Tera Dekh; Aksar (ft. The Rish); Fake Ones (ft. Shez & Flowbo); 4U Remix (ft. Maanu); Boht Kuch (ft. Flowbo & Young Galib); Theek Hu Main (ft. Hellac); Rollercoaster (ft. Young Galib)	Emiway Bantai	The Rish; Avanto; Hippy Jack; AAKASH; Memax; Maanu
2025	From The Streets To The Streams	Dubai Company; Aflatoon (ft. Naezy); Hawa; Mei Hu; Mat Kar Lala; Lightspeed; Mera Naam Hai; Samandar; Woh Banaya; Sorat; Log Kya Kahenge; Those Dayz; FTSTTS Freeverse	Emiway Bantai	Tony James; Memax; Keman Beatz; Emiway Bantai
2026	Trap Aiba	Trap Aiba; Mr International; Sumwali Daav; Baby; BS; Khwab	Emiway Bantai	Memax

=== Extended plays ===
Year	EP	Tracks	Artist	Producer(s)
2017	MEIN	Asli Nakli; ABBU; Jhand Hai; MEIN	Emiway Bantai	Emiway Bantai
2019	No Brands	Checkmate; Zaruratich Nahi Hai; Sab Kuch New; No Brands	Emiway Bantai	Flamboy
2020	Dhundke Dikha	Billal (Intro); Dhundke Dikha; Miss Tujhe; Grind; Bantai; Feel (Outro)	Emiway Bantai	Robert Tar; Hippy Jack; Flamboy; Bass Mutant; Ryini Beats
2022	Monsoon	Busy (ft. Young Galib); Bhool Ja (ft. Ben Z, Memax, Young Galib); Kuch Aur (ft. Vaksh); Changed (ft. Young Galib); Yakeen (ft. Young Galib & Memax)	Emiway Bantai	Harsh Sohi; Memax; Pale 1080; Nishit Basumatary
2024	sPEAK	The End; Evil = Evil; Gani Bhai; Elevate	Emiway Bantai	Abyss; Memax; Emiway Bantai
2024	Northern Nights	Duniya Naraz; Nazare; Misunderstood; Mera Na Hua; Maaf Karo; Safar; Revontulet (Outro)	Emiway Bantai	Memax; Emiway Bantai; Backyard
2025	Bajis	Badshah; Josh Mei (ft. Young Galib); Tribute to Sidhu Moosewala; Paisa Paisa; Kaali Kaali Aankhein	Emiway Bantai	Tony James; Memax
2026	CNSTNCY	Legend; Life; Chhabi Kar (ft. MC R1); Meri Tarah Kaun; Jab Tak Mein Zinda Hu (ft. MC Insane); Jo Mein Hu; Kyu? (ft. Swaalina); Bus Tu; Primo	Emiway Bantai	Memax; Emiway Bantai; 10A

=== Singles discography ===
==== As lead artist ====
Title	Year	Producer(s)	Notes
Glint Lock (ft. Minta)	2013	Emiway Bantai	First single
Tap on the Floor (ft. Minta & Damsy)	2013	Emiway Bantai	
Yeh Meri Zindagi (ft. Monu Bid)	2013	Emiway Bantai	
F.O.U.R. Square (ft. Minta)	2014	Emiway Bantai	
Aur Bantai	2014	Emiway Bantai	
Bewafa Ho Dafa	2014	Emiway Bantai	
Hateli Khopdi	2014	Emiway Bantai	
Na Maine Jana	2015	Emiway Bantai	
Mera Naam Bantai (ft. Gagan)	2015	Emiway Bantai	
Chatrang	2015	Emiway Bantai	
Soch	2016	Emiway Bantai	
Aisa Kuch Shot Nahi Hai	2016	Emiway Bantai	
Tadak Padak	2016	Emiway Bantai	
Fun Dekho	2016	Sample	
Kala Dhan	2017	Emiway Bantai	
Mumbai Se Delhi Tak (ft. Krsna)	2017	Insane	
#SADAK	2017	PSYIK	Also features Raftaar
Mera Bhai Mera Bhai	2018	Robert Tar	
Ebu Hatela (ft. Meme Machine)	2018	Bluesanova	
Abe Chodna (ft. Muhfaad)	2018	Muhfaad	
Mazak Hai Kya	2018	Robert Tar	
Kaun Hu Mein	2018	Flamboy	
Kadak Ban	2018	Flamboy	Song was featured in the movie Gully Boy
Out of Sampark	2018	Flamboy	
Samajh Mein Aaya Kya?	2018	Flamboy	Diss track aimed at Raftaar, Divine and MC Stan
Giraftaar	2018	Bass Mutant	Diss track aimed at Raftaar
Khatam	2018	Bass Mutant	Diss track aimed at Raftaar
Boht Hard (ft. Thoratt)	2018	Tony James	
Tribute to Eminem	2018	Eminem	Uses the instrumental from Eminem's "Lose Yourself"
Jump Kar	2018	Flamboy	
Machayenge	2019	Tony James	
Dhyan De	2019	Kray Twinz	
Skrrt Karenge (ft. Meme Machine)	2019	Crazyvibe	
Freeverse Feast	2019	Jacko Beats	
Jallad	2019	Flamboy	
I Been That (ft. DAX )	2019	Lex Nour	
BAJO	2019	Tony James	
Seedha Takeover	2019	Flamboy	
Pagal Sa Rapper	2019	Bass Mutant	
Dhua Dhua	2019	Call Me G	
Bharosa	2020	Hippy Jack	
Nightrider (ft. THEMXXNLIGHT)	2020	Sledgren, Alecto	
Firse Machayenge	2020	Tony James	
Maalik	2020	Flamboy	
Batista Bomb	2020	Chris Rich Beats	
Khatam Karona	2020	PSYIK	
Superhit	2020	Juanko Beats	
HARD	2020	Hippy Jack	
Gully Ka Kutta	2020	Flamboy	Diss track aimed at Divine
New World (ft. Lexz Pryde & Snoop Dogg)	2020	Kiran Bengal, Nick Price	
Ab Puch	2020	Stwo, Singawd, Blomkamp, JT Gagarin	Uses the instrumental from "One Way" by 6lack & T-Pain
Firse Machayenge (Remix) (ft. Macklemore)	2020	Tony James	
Round One	2020	Pendo46	
Kaun Hai Ye	2020	Pendo46	
Lonely (ft. Prznt)	2020	Vodli	
Charge (ft. Nana Rogues)	2020	Nana Rogues	
Thanks to God	2020	Pendo46	
Ladka Alag Sa	2020	Flamboy	
As-Salaam Walekum	2020	Flamboy	
100 Kadam Pe	2020	Pendo46	
Khona Hai	2020	Meme Machine	
Khatam Hue Waande	2020	Yoki	
Ring Ring (ft. Meme Machine)	2020	Meme Machine	
Don't Be The One (ft. Kara Marni)	2020	Flamboy	
Royal Rumble	2020	Bkay Music	
What Can I Do	2021	Flamboy	
No Love (ft. Loka)	2021	Aakash	
THC Cypher (ft. Minta, Hellac, Meme Machine, Dopeadelicz)	2021	Flamboy	First single from Bantai Records
Jamaica To India (ft. Chris Gayle)	2021	Tony James	
Shy	2021	Meme Machine	
Sath Mai (ft. Meme Machine & Swaalina)	2021	Meme Machine	
Paani Mai (ft. Young Galib & Swaalina)	2021	Yoki, Tony James	
Heal	2021	Emiway Bantai	
That's How I Feel	2021	Andyr	
Shukriya	2021	Andyr	
Street Talk	2021	Memax	
Ruthless (ft. Memax & Jaxk)	2022	Memax	
Chusamba	2022	Refix	Diss track aimed at Raftaar and Krsna
KR L$DA SIGN	2022	Saint Cardona	Diss track aimed at Krsna
Jhootha (ft. Celina Sharma)	2022		
Machayenge 4	2022	Isioa, Pendo46, Emiway Bantai	Diss track aimed at Krsna
F#CK EMIWAY	2022	Hippy Jack	
Thanks To My Haters	2022	Saint Cardona, Rishbeats	
Lobotomy (ft. Lazarus)	2022	Stan Da Man	
Baby (ft. Young Galib)	2022	Tony James	
GUESS	2022	Kabu Beats	
Pyaar Hai	2022	Hippy Jack	
DRILL	2022	lejJA	
Kudi	2023	deyz	Song released from Namoh Studios
Indian Hip Hop Cypher (ft. Memax, Shez, Young Galib, Flowbo, Hitzone, Hellac, Jaxk, Minta)	2023	Memax, Refix, Tony James	
Still Number 1	2023	Bargholz	
Good Boy	2023	Yo Yo Honey Singh	
Rehem	2023	Memax	
W	2023	Gore Ocean	
One Hai Re Bhai	2024	Anyvibe	
Independent	2024	Tokyo	
Chalis	2024	Cultxre	
Roko 2mg	2024	Angad wav	Diss track aimed at King
Meet the Instagram Yapper	2024	Memax	Diss track aimed at King
Dependent Kauve	2024	ThatKidGoran	Diss track aimed at King
Zindagi Mast Hai	2024	Tony James	
Kya Total?	2025	Tony James	
Bhule Nahi	2025	Emiway Bantai, Memax	
Big Stepper	2025	Emiway Bantai, Memax	Diss track aimed at Divine
-10/20	2026	Emiway Bantai	
Follow Karo	2026	Emiway Bantai	
Lazanus	2026	TFlame Beats, H1TMAN Beats, HosseinAmin Beats	Diss track aimed at Lazarus
The Final Burial of Lazanus	2026	Emiway Bantai, Narvaza	Diss track aimed at Lazarus
Seedha Mai Kal Jackson	2026	Emiway Bantai	
Dreams	2026	Emwiay Bantai, Memax	
Jaane Jaa	2026	Memax	
#Sadak 2.0 (ft. Token)	2026	PSYIK	
Bolra Hai Sadak	2026	Memax	Song supporting 2026 Jantar Mantar Protest
Safal	2026	Memax	Red Bull 64 Bars by Def Jam Recordings India

==== As featured artist ====
Track	Year	Producer(s)	Project
Lean On (Celina Sharma ft. Emiway Bantai)	2019	Tremaine Sandhu	
Bad Munda (Jass Manak ft. Emiway Bantai)	2021	Deep Jandu	Bad Munda
Kya Bolte Bro (Memax ft. Loka and Emiway Bantai)	2021	Memax	Memax
Raja (Hellac ft. Emiway Bantai)	2021	Madhur Shinde	Raja
Maante Naahi Haar (Minta ft. Emiway Bantai)	2022	BS Beats, Flossy Draco	Maante Naahi Haar
Show Me (Prznt ft. Emiway Bantai)	2024	Adrian Schafer	
Main Hawa Mein Hu (Maninder Buttar ft. Emiway Bantai)	2024	Tony James	
KYU (Swaalina ft. Emiway Bantai)	2026	Emiway Bantai	S.W.A

=== Film soundtracks ===
Year	Film	Track	Co-Singer(s)	Composer(s)	Lyricist(s)	Note
2026	Udta Teer	Choozay	Jigar Saraiya	Sachin-Jigar	Amitabh Bhattacharya, Emiway Bantai	Hindi film
2026	Prahaar: The Untold Story of Ujjwal Nikam	Mumbai Sapno Ka Samandar	Sunidhi Chauhan	Emiway Bantai, Swaalina	Emiway Bantai, Swaalina	Hindi film

=== Promotional tracks ===
Song	Year	Artists	Promoting
Sabse Saste 5 Din	2019	Emiway Bantai	Big Bazaar
Bajo	2019	Emiway Bantai	Royal Enfield
Big Billion Days	2020	Emiway Bantai	Realme, Flipkart
narzo	2021	Emiway Bantai	Realme
realme Narzo 50 series	2021	Emiway Bantai	Realme
Do It Your Way	2023	Emiway Bantai, Naâman, Ranveer Allahbadia, Umran Malik	Celio
Haath Dhona Cool Hai	2023	Emiway Bantai	Savlon
