= ITA Award for Best Thriller/Horror Serial =

Indian Television Academy award

ITA Award for Thriller/Horror Serial
- Awarded for: Best Horror or Thriller Television series
- Sponsored by: Indian Television Academy (Mumbai, India)
- First award: 2003
- Final award: 2019
- Website: http://indiantelevisionacademy.com

ITA Award for Best Thriller/Horror Serial is an award given by Indian Television Academy as a part of its annual event.

== Winners ==
Year	Show	Channel	Production House	Reference
2003	Kya Hadsaa Kya Haqeeqat	Sony TV		
2004	CID	Sony TV	Fireworks Productions	
2005	Special Squad	Star One		
2006	Akela	Sony TV	Fireworks Productions	
2007	Ssshhhh... Phir Koi Hai	Star Plus	Contiloe Entertainment	
2008	Ajeeb	9X		
2009	CID	Sony TV	Fireworks Productions	
2010	Powder	Sony TV	YRF Television	
2010	CID	Sony TV	Fireworks Productions	
2011	Girls' Day Out	MTV		
2012	Gumrah: End of Innocence	Channel V India	Star India	
2013	Savdhaan India	Life OK	Saregama India Ltd	
2014	24	Colors TV	Ramesh Deo Productions	
2015	CID	Sony TV	Fireworks Productions	
2016	Savdhaan India	Life OK		
2017	Dev	Colors TV		
2018	Dev 2	Colors TV		
2019	Nazar	StarPlus	4 Lions Films; Surinder Films	
