= Indrani Mukerjea =

British consultant and media executive

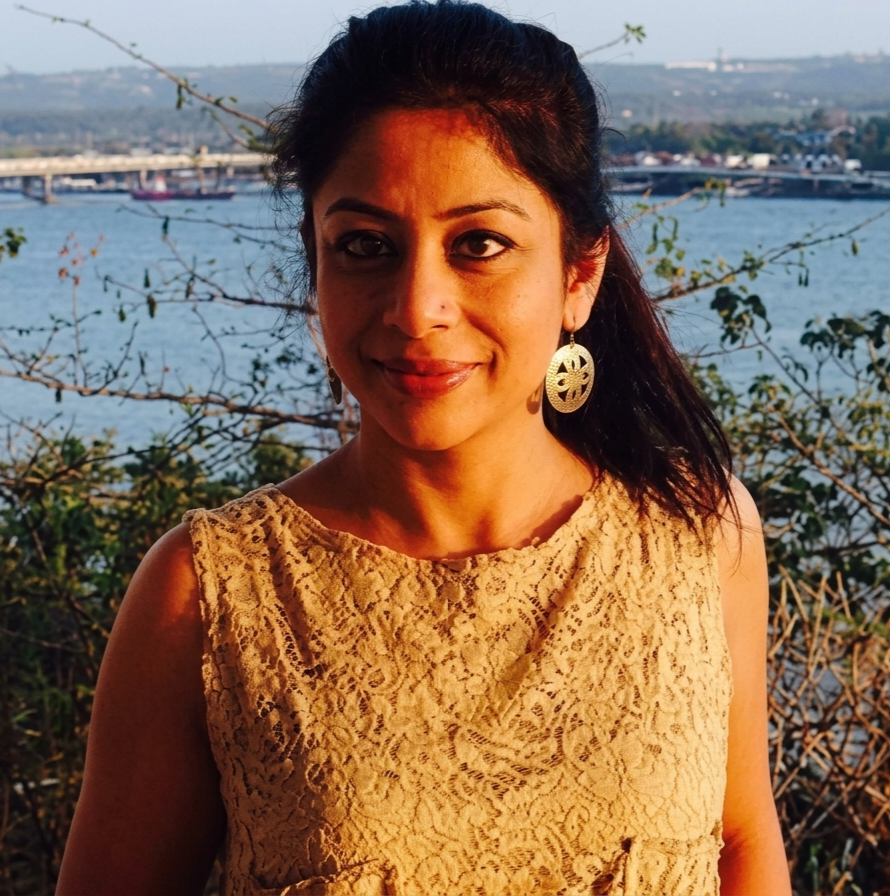
- Indrani Mukerjea in Goa, 2014
- Born: Pori Bora; Guwahati, Assam, India
- Citizenship: Indian (until 2012); British (from 2012)
- Occupations: HR consultant and media executive
- Years active: 1996–2009
- Known for: INX Media, Sheena Bora murder case
- Spouses: Sanjeev Khanna (m. 1993; div. 2002); Peter Mukerjea (m. 2002; dev. 2017)
- Partner: Siddhartha Das (1986–1989)
- Children: 3

Indrani Mukerjea (born Pori Bora) is a British former HR consultant and media executive. She is the ex-wife of Peter Mukerjea, a retired television executive. In 2007, she co-founded INX Media with him, and took on the role of CEO. She resigned from the company in 2009, and later sold her stake in it. In 2015, she was arrested and charged as the main accused in the alleged murder of her daughter, Sheena Bora. After more than six years in custody, she was released on bail in 2022. Starting from 2024, she ventured into theatre production and acting.

== Personal life ==
Indrani Mukerjea was born in Guwahati, Assam, into an Assamese family to Upendra Kumar Bora and Durga Rani Bora. She was named Pori Bora at birth and spent her childhood in Guwahati. While as per records she is born in the year 1972 however as per Siddhartha Das, former husband of Indrani Mukherjee her real age should be more than 7 years than what is stated in the records. After completing school there, she moved to Shillong to pursue higher education at Lady Keane College. In 1986 she met Siddhartha Das with whom she had a daughter, Sheena, in February 1987 and a son, Mikhail, in September 1988. In 1990 Indrani left the children under the care of her parents in Guwahati and moved to Kolkata. There she studied computers and stayed as a paying guest. A few months after her move to Kolkata, she met Sanjeev Khanna. They got married in 1993 and had a daughter named Vidhie in 1997. In 2001 they moved to Mumbai.

In 2002, Indrani met Peter Mukerjea and moved in with him while awaiting her divorce from Sanjeev Khanna. In November 2002, Indrani married Peter Mukerjea. After this marriage Vidhie Khanna moved in with the Mukerjeas and took the Mukerjea name.

Around 2012 Indrani acquired British citizenship based on marriage to Peter Mukerjea, himself a United Kingdom citizen. From 2012 until 2015, the Mukerjeas divided their time between residences in Worli, Mumbai, Bristol, UK and Marbella, Spain. She had also carried an Overseas Citizenship of India.

== Career ==
In 1996 Indrani founded INX Services Private Limited as a recruitment company in Kolkata. In 2001 Indrani moved to Mumbai, where her recruitment firm considered Reliance Industries as her most important client. The firm also handled recruitment for STAR India. In 2005, the firm formed a partnership with Switzerland-based global executive search specialist, IMD International Search Group, which appointed Indrani as its regional director, Asia Pacific.

In December 2006 Peter and Indrani Mukerjea became promoters of the INX Group, which consisted of human resources companies INX Services and INX Executive Search, and media companies INX Media and INX News. Indrani was appointed chairperson of INX Group. Peter and Indrani Mukerjea held a 50% stake in INX Media. The other half was held by private equity firms for a total funding of $170 million (₹750 crore according to the exchange rate at the time).

INX News was incorporated on 22 December 2006 with an authorized capital of ₹7.5 crore (75 million) divided into 75 lakh (7.5 million) shares of ₹10 each. INX Media took a 26% stake in INX News since Government of India regulations did not permit foreign direct investment in Indian news media beyond that limit at that time. IM Media, a corporate entity claimed to be 99% owned by Indrani Mukerjea through her holding company Indrani Incon Pvt Ltd., held the majority 51% stake in INX News. Indrani Mukerjea personally held a 17% stake. Peter Mukerjea, a foreign national, could not claim ownership in INX News. In March 2007 Vir Sanghvi, hired as CEO of INX News, was given a 16% stake as sweat equity.

Peter Mukerjea, bound by a non-compete clause from his previous employer, became chairman of the human resources company INX Services Private Limited in January 2007. In August 2007, Peter joined INX Media as chairman and chief strategy officer. In November 2007 Indrani became the CEO of INX Media.

At INX Media, Peter looked after advertisement, finance, distribution and revenues while Indrani was in charge of content, human resources and marketing. In the first phase of operations, INX Media launched the Hindi general entertainment channel 9X and the Hindi youth music channel 9XM in November 2007. NewsX, an English news channel, launched in March 2008. In its first year of operations, the INX Group spent almost the entire corpus it had raised from foreign investors. Employees suspected that vendors were encouraged to present inflated invoices so that the Mukerjeas could earn kickbacks. By September 2008, all the investors in INX Media were looking to sell some part of their stake to raise funding for the second phase of expansion. They wanted $150 million to launch three regional channels, three regional music channels and three city-specific news channels.

During the 2008 financial crisis, advertisers could not pay their dues and INX Media in turn could not pay its vendors. Employees suspected that TRP ratings of the general entertainment channel 9X were being added to those of NewsX in order to present a rosy picture to the investors. An audit conducted by Temasek Holdings brought up suspicions that the Mukerjeas had siphoned off ₹160 crores (₹1.6 billion) from the company. In January 2009, the Mukerjeas sold INX Media and its loss-making channel NewsX to Indi Media Network, a partnership between the Nai Dunia promoter and CEO Vinay Chhajlani and former Businessworld editor Jehangir S Pochaa. By March 2009 INX Media had accumulated losses of Rs 800 crore and was in debt to the tune of Rs 100 crore. Temasek Holdings and Kotak Mahindra were looking to exit. With the company running out of cash and outstanding payments to creditors mounting, the Mukerjeas resigned from their management positions. In March 2009 Indrani left, with Peter following a month later. By April 2010, the Mukerjeas had sold their stake in the company. In May 2011, the Mukerjeas resigned from their position on the board of directors of the company.

In 2024, Indrani started her career as a performer with The Sunkissed Phoenix, a theater production, which did its debut at Khushwant Singh Literature Festival. She did 2 more theater productions as part of her venture Indrani Mukerjea Enterprise in 2025, Chitrangada: Ek Sashakt Naari, a story from Mahabharata written by Rabindranath Tagore, which debuted at Royal Opera House in Mumbai in 2025. In 2026, it was performed in Delhi at PragatiE Vichaar Literature Festival (PVLF). Indrani Mukerjea Enterprise also launched Nayika Bhoomika, 4 powerful stories from Rabindranath Tagore. The show debuted in Mumbai in December 2025 and was performed in Delhi at PragatiE Vichaar Literature Festival (PVLF).

== Awards ==
In November 2008, The Wall Street Journal named Indrani as one of 50 Women to Watch. Uttar Bhartiya Mahasangh, an organization that aims to promote the North Indian community in the country, awarded Indrani Mukerjea with the title of Uttar Ratna for her "outstanding work in the art, media and broadcasting sector".

She was named among the Top 33 Women Achievers of India in 2023 by the Indian Achievers’ Club.

In 2024 and 2025, she received the Rex Karmaveer Global Fellowship and the Karamveer Chakra Award, conferred by iCONGO in partnership with the United Nations, for contributions to arts, culture, and social impact.

Iconic Innovative Entrepreneur of the Year at the Mid-Day Glitz and Glamour Icons awards in 2024.

'Unbroken' received the Best Debut Non-Fiction Award at the PragatiE Vichaar Literature Festival in 2025.

== Controversies ==
=== Conflict and fraud at INX Media ===
Starting from mid-2007 Indrani Mukerjea, as the chairperson of INX News, found herself in conflict with Vir Sanghvi, the CEO over control of the organization. On January 23, 2008 NewsX announced that as a consequence, Vir Sanghvi would resign on January 29, 2008.

On the evening of January 31, 2008 Indrani Mukerjea fired five television journalists at NewsX without prior notice or explanation: executive editor Avirook Sen, head of domestic news, Rajesh Sundaram, editorial adviser Nick Pollard, consultant Arun Roy Chowdhury, and news anchor Kailash Menon. Protesting against this unprofessional conduct, a further nine television journalists resigned, among them news coordinator Prakash Patra, and Narendra Nag. The following day, February 1, 2008, a group of former NewsX employees took their grievances to Priya Ranjan Dasmunsi, then Minister of Information and Broadcasting in the Government of India. Dasmunshi conveyed their concern over dubious sources of funding at INX Media to P. Chidambaram, then Minister of Finance in the Government of India. Chidambaram in turn requested the Serious Fraud Investigation Office (SFIO) to look into the allegations of financial impropriety.

In February 2008 Rajesh Sundaram and Avirook Sen filed legal notices against NewsX seeking damages over their unfair dismissal. By September 15, 2008 Avirook Sen had received a settlement worth ₹2 crore (₹20 million) paid out over four equal monthly installments.

In the weeks following the departure of Vir Sanghvi, there was a mass exodus of talent from NewsX, leaving it unable to meet its commitment to jittery investors of the launch of a news channel by March 31, 2008. The Mukerjeas started exploring an exit route from INX Media and ultimately sold it to Indi Media Network, partly owned by Nai Dunia promoter and CEO Vinay Chhajlani.

According to a report filed by the Serious Fraud Investigation Office (SFIO) in April 2013 based on its investigation into the Niira Radia tapes, IM Media, the majority stake holder in INX News, was a front for Mukesh Ambani's Reliance Industries Limited (RIL). As per SFIO, Chhajlani's Nai Dunia was also indirectly owned by Mukesh Ambani, thus making IM Media and Nai Dunia related companies. On January 7, 2009 shares in INX Media, previously valued at ₹208.24, were sold to Nai Dunia for just ₹10 each. The SFIO report recommended charges be filed for causing wrongful losses to the ordinary shareholders of RIL under Indian Penal Code Sections 120B (conspiracy), 415 (cheating), 418 (cheating with knowledge that wrongful loss may ensue to person whose interest offender is bound to protect), and 420 (cheating and dishonestly inducing delivery of property).

=== Foreign exchange violation at INX Group ===
In 2010, the Enforcement Directorate, a financial crime fighting agency, registered a case under Foreign Exchange Management Act, 1999 (FEMA) for diverting foreign direct investment by three Mauritius-based companies in INX Media to its step down subsidiaries without prior approval of the Foreign Investment Promotion Board (FIPB). The three companies named were New Vernon Private Equity Limited, New Silk Route (NSR) PE Mauritius, and Dunearn Investment (Mauritius). In 2013 the investigation was halted without explanation. In May 2014 the investigative wing of the Central Board of Direct Taxes compiled a tax history of the INX Group and suggested that the Mukerjeas had laundered ₹275.5 crore (₹2.755 billion) via Mauritius into eight INX Group subsidiary companies between 2007 and 2008. In September 2015 the Mumbai office of the Enforcement Directorate indicated that it would reopen the 2010 FEMA case under the Prevention of Money Laundering Act, 2002.

=== Sheena Bora murder case ===
In 2015 Indrani Mukerjea was arrested by Mumbai Police in connection with the alleged murder of her daughter, Sheena Bora, in 2012. She was sent to judicial custody at a women's-only prison in Byculla Jail, Mumbai. The Central Bureau of Investigation (CBI) took over the case and filed charges against Indrani under the Indian Penal Code Sections 302 (murder), 201 (causing disappearance of evidence), 34 (criminal conspiracy), 420 (cheating and forgery), 364 (kidnapping) and 120-B (conspiracy). CBI officials contended that Peter and Indrani Mukerjea had siphoned off money from INX Media and parked it in an offshore bank account in Sheena Bora's name. The CBI speculated this financial angle as a motive for Sheena Bora's murder. Sheena Bora was also in a relationship with Peter Mukerjea's son from earlier marriage, Rahul, which Indrani Mukerjea disapproved of.

While in custody, Mukerjea informed the court in 2016 that she had translated 700 verses of the Bhagavad Gita into English from Sanskrit. She had sought permission from a CBI court in Mumbai to publish them. In 2017, following a jail inmate's death due to alleged torture by jail officials, Indrani and 200 other prisoners in Byculla women's prison were booked for rioting. The jail officials accused of murdering the inmate are currently being tried in a fast-track court.

After her bail plea was rejected by the Bombay High Court, the Supreme Court granted her bail in 2022 after more than 6 years as an undertrial, and she returned home to her Worli residence. The Court while granting bail, noted that of the 237 prosecution witnesses, 185 witnesses still remain to be examined, and there was no sign of the trial completing soon. Her bail conditions included surrendering her passport, not contacting any of the witnesses, and not seeking adjournment of the case.

In 2024, Netflix released a docuseries The Indrani Mukerjea Story: Buried Truth, which explored the case.

== Memoir ==
Indrani Mukerjea wrote a memoir entitled Unbroken, which was published by HarperCollins in 2023.
