= Sheena Bora murder case =

2012 alleged murder in India

Sheena Das Bora
- Born: 11 February 1987; Guwahati, Assam,
- Died: 24 April 2012 (aged 25); Mumbai, Maharashtra
- Cause of death: Homicide (allegedly by strangulation)
- Body discovered: Pen, Raigad
- Education: Bachelor of Arts
- Alma mater: St. Xavier's College
- Employers: Mumbai Metro One (2011–2012); Reliance Infrastructure (2009–2011)
- Partner: Rahul Mukerjea
- Parents: Siddhartha Das (father of record); Upendra Kumar Bora (according to Indrani); Indrani Mukerjea (mother)
- Relatives: Mikhail Bora (brother); Vidhie Mukerjea (half-sister); Peter Mukerjea (step-father); Sanjeev Khanna (step-father); Upendra Kumar Bora (grandfather); Durga Rani Bora (grandmother)

Sheena Bora, a 25-year-old Indian woman working as an assistant manager for Mumbai Metro One based in Mumbai, went missing on 24 April 2012. In August 2015, Mumbai Police arrested her mother, Indrani Mukerjea, and her mother's driver, Shyamvar Pinturam Rai, for allegedly abducting and killing her and subsequently burning her corpse. In November 2015, her stepfather, Peter Mukerjea, was also arrested for his alleged part in the planning. Rai and Indrani's ex-husband Sanjeev Khanna allegedly confessed to the crime, while Indrani and Peter Mukerjea suggested that Sheena Bora was alive and living in the United States, with Indrani later saying Sheena might be living in Kashmir.

== Early life, family history, and personal life ==
Sheena Das Bora was born to Pori Bora (later known as Indrani Mukerjea) in 1987 in Shillong, Meghalaya. Her mother had befriended Siddhartha Das a few months earlier, and he was presented to society as Sheena's father. However, Indrani Mukerjea later said that her pregnancy was the result of having been raped at around age 14 by her father, Upendra Kumar Bora, and that the family had kept the rape a secret. Pori and Das then had a son named Mikhail (sometimes spelled Mekhail).

Later, Siddhartha Das said they had lived together for three years and that he was the father of Sheena and Mikhail, but also said they had never become legally married.

Pori Bora left Das in 1989, leaving her two children under the care of her parents, Upendra Kumar Bora and Durga Rani, in Guwahati, and moved to Kolkata. There she studied computers and stayed as a paying guest. Sheena and her brother were subsequently raised in the Guwahati by their maternal grandparents (one of whom was later alleged to be Sheena's biological father).

In Kolkata, Indrani married Sanjeev Khanna in 1993, and the couple had a daughter Vidhie. They divorced in 2002, and Indrani married Peter Mukerjea the same year. Peter Mukerjea also had a son named Rahul from a previous marriage.

When Sheena and Mikhail learned about their mother and moved to Mumbai in 2006, Indrani introduced them as her younger siblings, concealing their identity as her children. Mikhail Bora later alleged that Indrani had him forcibly committed to a mental institution and tortured for a month in 2006 to cover up her identity as his mother.

Sheena was admitted to St. Xavier's College, Mumbai where she obtained a Bachelor of Arts degree (2006–2009). In 2009, she joined Reliance Infrastructure as a management trainee. In June 2011, Sheena joined Mumbai Metro One as an assistant manager.

== Disappearance ==
On 24 April 2012, Sheena took a leave of absence. On the same day, Rahul Mukerjea (Sheena's step-brother who she was dating) received a breakup SMS message from Sheena's phone. Her mother, Indrani, said that Sheena had gone to the United States for higher studies and hence a missing First Information Report (FIR) was never filed. Sheena was never seen after 24 April 2012.

None of Sheena's family members filed a police report to initiate a missing person investigation, despite repeated pleas to do so from Rahul. Rahul went to two different police departments and attempted to file a report himself, but the police refused to accept his report.

On Rahul's insistence, Mumbai Police visited Indrani's Worli residence where they were informed by the staff that Indrani was out of India. Upon her return, Indrani visited the Worli police station and informed the officers that Rahul was trying to stalk Sheena and that was why Sheena had moved to the US without informing him.

Rahul pointed out that Sheena would have needed her passport to travel overseas, but she had not taken it with her, as it had been left behind with him, but Indrani said Sheena had gotten a new passport issued. No attempt was apparently made to check whether there was a record of a new passport actually being issued. Rahul then moved to Dehradun to live with his mother.

== Discovery of death and subsequent investigation ==
Four months before Indrani's arrest, Mumbai Police started surveilling her. The surveillance was initiated after a tip-off. Shyamvar Pinturam Rai, Indrani's driver, was arrested on 21 August 2015 for possession of illegal weapons and it was alleged that, during his interrogation, he revealed details of Sheena's murder. On 26 August 2015, Sheena's brother Mikhail revealed that she was Indrani's daughter rather than a sister.

Quoting the First Information Report filed by Mumbai Police, the Hindustan Times reported that Rai had given a detailed account of the murder to the police. Rai alleged that Indrani had planned it and had discussed it with her ex-husband, Sanjeev Khanna. He alleged that Indrani had surveyed a likely area to dump the body the evening before the murder. On 24 April 2012, Khanna had flown to Mumbai and checked into the Hotel Hilltop at Worli. Rai alleged that Indrani had rented an Opel Corsa to facilitate the abduction of Sheena and for disposal of her body. Indrani, he claimed, had earlier asked Sheena to meet her on the evening of 24 April 2012 and, though reluctant, she had agreed. At about 06:00 PM on 24 April 2012, he went on, Indrani was joined by her ex-husband at his hotel in Worli. An hour later, when Sheena was dropped off by Rahul Mukerjea near National College on Linking Road in Bandra, Indrani, Khanna, and driver Rai were there to meet her. Rai's account continued, alleging that Indrani sat next to him while Sheena was in the rear seat with Khanna. He said they took her to one of the by-lanes in Bandra and Khanna strangled her.

The police claimed that, after the murder, Sheena's body was taken to Indrani's house at Worli where it was put in a bag and stuffed in the trunk of the car.

Rai alleged that Khanna later left for his hotel while Indrani stayed home and Rai slept inside the car with the body in the trunk. In the early hours of 25 April 2012, he said, the three drove to the village of Gagode in Pen tehsil, Raigad. Concerned about the possibility of police checks, they propped Sheena's body up between Indrani and Khanna on the rear seat, as if asleep, rather than putting it in the boot.

At 04:00 AM on 25 April 2012, police alleged, they dragged the body out of the car in an isolated spot in the forest, stuffed it back into the bag, poured petrol over it, and set it ablaze. After the body was completely burnt, the accused returned to Mumbai. Khanna left Mumbai later that day.

== Arrest and aftermath ==
On 25 August 2015, Mumbai Police arrested Indrani Mukerjea, accusing her of murdering Sheena. Indrani was charged under sections 302 (murder), 201 (disposing evidence or giving false statements), 363 (kidnapping) and 34 (common intention) of the Indian Penal Code and taken to the Bandra Metropolitan Magistrates' court, which remanded her in police custody. On 26 August 2015, Indrani's ex-husband Sanjeev was also arrested in Kolkata and charged under sections 364 (kidnapping), 302 (murder), 201 (causing disappearance of evidence) and 120-B (conspiracy) of the Indian Penal Code in the same case. Sanjeev allegedly confessed to the offences charged. Peter Mukerjea was arrested on 19 November 2015, on charges related to Sheena Bora's murder and was also accused of siphoning company funds into a bank account in Sheena Bora's name in Singapore.

Rai led police to a location in Raigad where he said the body had been burned and disposed of, and there some charred remains of bones, a skull, and teeth were found. Investigators were unable to extract DNA from the teeth, but succeeded with a piece of femur. In September 2015, the femur DNA was reported to very closely match the DNA profile of Indrani Mukerjea, confirming the femur was from Indrani's biological child Sheena Bora. Testing to determine the paternity of Sheena and Mikhail had not yet been completed. A couple of weeks later, other samples collected in May 2012 were reported to not match. It was reported that the correct evidence for the other set of samples may have been lost, so the samples that did not match could have been from a different source.

In 2022, the Bombay High Court granted bail to Indrani after 6 years as an undertrial, and said that of the 237 prosecution witnesses, 185 witnesses still remain to be examined, and there was no sign of the trial completing soon.She wrote a memoir entitled Unbroken, which extensively discussed the case from her perspective. It was published by HarperCollins in 2023.

In July 2024, the CBI told the court that Sheena's remains have been found.

== In popular culture ==
In 2016, Agnidev Chatterjee directed the movie Dark Chocolate to depict a dramatised version of the Sheena Bora murder case. The film starred Mahima Chaudhry and Riya Sen as Indrani Mukherjee and Sheena Bora, respectively.

On 29 February 2024, Netflix released a four-part documentary series on the case, called The Indrani Mukerjea Story: Buried Truth.
