= Prahaar: The Untold Story of Ujjwal Nikam =

2026 Indian film by Avinash Arun

- Theatrical release poster
- Directed by: Avinash Arun
- Written by: Sumit Roy
- Produced by: Dinesh Vijan
- Starring: Rajkummar Rao; Wamiqa Gabbi; Jaideep Ahlawat; Sikandar Kher; Ashish Vidyarthi; Lalit Prabhakar; Ritvik Sahore
- Cinematography: Avinash Arun
- Edited by: Charu Shree Roy
- Music by: Songs: Vishal Mishra; Emiway Bantai; Score: Alokananda Dasgupta
- Production company: Maddock Films
- Distributed by: Jio Studios
- Release date: 16 October 2026
- Running time: 140 minutes
- Country: India
- Language: Hindi
- Budget: est. ₹70 crore
- Box office: ₹30.23 crore

Prahaar: The Untold Story of Ujjwal Nikam is a 2026 Indian Hindi-language legal drama film directed by Avinash Arun and produced by Dinesh Vijan under the banner of Maddock Films. It stars Rajkummar Rao, Wamiqa Gabbi, Lalit Prabhakar, Jaideep Ahlawat and Sikandar Kher in lead roles. The film explores Public Prosecutor Ujjwal Nikam's role in legal battles surrounding the 1993 Bombay bombings and 2008 Mumbai attacks.

Prahaar: The Untold Story of Ujjwal Nikam was theatrically released on 16 October 2026.

== Plot ==
On 12 September 2006, public prosecutor Ujjwal Nikam is prosecuting several suspects for their involvement in the 1993 Mumbai bombings. After the judge delivers the sentences, with some condemned to death, Nikam, his wife Jyoti, and Joint Commissioner of Police Bipin Naria mark the occasion, where Nikam gives a short speech about how the battle is yet to be won, and that such battles have taken his time away from family responsibilities.

On 26 November 2008, Nikam is at his daughter Sharvari's wedding in Goa. While asked to come on stage for a photograph, he receives a phone call, which changes his expression. Watching the news on TV, he is shocked to see that Mumbai is under a massive terrorist attack. Returning to his temporary residence in Mumbai, he observes smoke billowing from the Taj Mahal Palace Hotel during the attack. As the attacks end, he meets Minister of Home Affairs P. Chidambaram and other government officials, and is appointed to prosecute Ajmal Kasab, the only gunman captured by Mumbai Police. As Chidambaram suggests implementing 12 chargesheets due to different locations of the attacks, Nikam suggests a single chargesheet, noting that although prosecution will take longer, it will build a stronger case and point the involvement of terror groups and ISI in Pakistan. Chidambaram reluctantly agrees, telling him that he will be representing India rather than just the State of Maharashtra during the course of trial.

As the trial begins, Nikam meets Kasab's lawyer Abbas Kazmi in the courtroom. Kasab deposes to the judge M.L. Tahaliyani that he is a minor, and the police tortured him and forced him to confess to be a terrorist. A shocked Nikam requests the judge to have a medical evaluation done on Kasab, which concludes that he is an adult, and the judge reprimands Kazmi for wasting the court's time. One evening, while going through the case files, his son Aniket returns from the US, having completed his law degree. Seeing the pile of files of witness statements with limited time in hands, Nikam reluctantly appoints Aniket as a junior to assist him.

As the trial continues, Kazmi tries various tactics of discrediting witness testimonies, like the head nurse from Cama Hospital, press photographer Sebastian D'Souza who captured Kasab's photos inside the CST station and near Times of India building, Police Inspector Sanjay Govilkar, who helped capture Kasab at Girgaum with martyred ASI Tukaram Omble, and head constable Arun Jadhav, who was severely wounded when Kasab and his partner Ismail Khan indiscriminately fired at him and his seniors Hemant Karkare, Vijay Salaskar and Ashok Kamte, due to certain discrepancies in their statements and evidence presented. Nikam starts facing difficulties during the trial, and at the same time, Aniket learns that his mother suffers from a tumor, though he is asked not to share, causing a clash between them after he attends a phone call during a meeting, causing Aniket to withdraw. Complicating the matters is when Nikam is told that a Pakistani delegation of lawyers led by Chaudhary Zulfiqar Ali has arrived to examine the case, leading to another dispute in the courtroom. Privately, while having lunch, Ali tells Nikam that terrorists like Kasab are not born, but are rather brainwashed into committing such acts under the guise of poverty and earning a glorius path to heaven for their actions.

With no outcome, Kasab then makes a confession during one hearing that it was his partner Ismail who was indiscriminately firing at people at the Mumbai CST, while Kasab claims that he only fired in the air. Believing his account to be false, Nikam tries to get the testimony of a nine-year-old girl, who saw her pregnant mother being shot dead by Kasab. Initially breaking down, she reveals how Kasab was mercilessly firing from his assault rifle, and that he had no remorse when he shot her mother. As the court is adjourned, Nikam reminds Kasab of what his mother is going through back in Faridkot, who reacts in anger and warns Nikam to leave his mother out. Nikam later rushes to the hospital after learning about Jyoti's condition, reprimanding Aniket for hiding it. During the hospital visit, he is asked to visit Pakistan. Initially declining, Jyoti convinces him to change his mind.

As he visits Pakistan with another official Desai, he meets their attorney general, criticizing that the money spent on weapons would have been better used for other purposes. On meeting Ali again, he finds out that judges there have been receiving transfer orders after attempting to criminally charge the masterminds Sajid Mir, Hafiz Saeed and Zakiur Rehman Lakhvi. While having dinner with Ali, the latter expresses hope for a change in the current state of affairs, stating that in due process, he has been away from family, committing to make up for that lost time when he gets a chance, which Nikam empathizes and agrees on. He later spends time with Jyoti after her surgery for her recovery upon his return.

Meanwhile, with Kasab showing no remorse for his actions for months, is taken to the morgue and shown the bodies of his slain fellow terrorists by Naria. Shocked by seeing the condition of their bodies, Kasab suffers from a breakdown. During the next hearing, Kazmi quits as Kasab's lawyer due to disagreements with the judge, and another lawyer Pawar assisting Kazmi takes over the case. At the hearing, Kasab makes a tearful confession of the plot hatched by Lashkar-e-Taiba leaders and rogue Pakistan Army officials, as well as the training details. As the trial nears conclusion, Nikam observes Aniket fighting a case in another courtroom, and they finally reconcile after he shares that Ali was gunned down in Pakistan for cooperating with Nikam and trying to ascertain the facts of the terror attack.

On the closing day, Nikam argues that the for such mass murder, and for waging a war against India, Kasab does not meet the criteria of minimum sentencing of life imprisonment, adding that he should be hanged till his death. The judge, in his statement for sentencing, eventually declares that on the charges of terrorism, murder, and waging war against India, Kasab should be hanged till his death. Hearing this, Kasab stays silent, while the survivors, police officers, and members of the press express relief. As Nikam walks out of the court room, he is applauded by police personnel, including those who faced Kasab, and Aniket embraces him.

On 21 November 2012, upon waking up early morning at Yerawada Central Jail, Kasab is asked for his final wish and requests a few tomatoes. While eating them, he emotionally breaks down, thinking about his mother. As he is taken to the gallows by prison guards, he is executed for his crimes.

The film ends with an epilogue, detailing the prosecution timeline of the 2008 Mumbai attacks, and how Nikam fought this case hard, while paying a tribute to the victims who were killed in the attack.

== Cast ==
- Rajkummar Rao as Ujjwal Nikam
- Lalit Prabhakar as Ajmal Kasab
- Jaideep Ahlawat as Chaudhary Zulfiqar Ali, Pakistani prosecutor who was gunned down in a car because he cooperated with Nikam in exposing conspiracy back home
- Wamiqa Gabbi as Jyoti Nikam, Ujjwal's wife
- Ashish Vidyarthi as Justice M.L. Tahaliyani
- Sikandar Kher as Abbas Kazmi
- Nassar as P. Chidambaram
- Tarun Sharma as Abu Ismail, one of Kasab's co-conspirators who was killed in action at Girgaum Chowpatty.
- Ritvik Sahore as Aniket Nikam
- Prasanna Ketkar as Inspector Sanjay Govilkar
- Pranali Ghogare as Sharvari Nikam
- Ajinkya Deo as Joint Commissioner of Police Bipin Naria, based on Rakesh Maria
- Yogesh Kelkar as Dr. Mohite, forensic and medical expert
- Bharat Ganeshpure as Chhagan Bhujbal

== Production ==
=== Development ===
The film was announced in July 2025. It was scripted to the biopic of Ujjwal Nikam. Story, screenplay, and dialogues by Sumit Roy with additional dialogues by Dushyant Arora and additional screenplay and story by Vishal Tiwari.

=== Casting ===
Initially Aamir Khan was set to play the Nikam's role, but Khan had to step down from the project and Rao was finalised for the role of Ujjwal Nikam. Lalit Prabhakar was selected for the role of Ajmal Kasab. Wamiqa Gabbi joined as the female lead with Rao. This film is second collaboration between Rao and Gabbi after Bhool Chuk Maaf.

=== Filming ===
Principal photography began in October 2025. Rao wrapped in February 2026.

=== Music ===
The film's music was composed by Vishal Mishra and Emiway Bantai and lyrics were penned by Amitabh Bhattacharya and Emiway Bantai. The first single from the soundtrack, "Mere Rehte", featuring Vishal Mishra was released on September 30,2026. Third single "Mumbai Sapno Ka Samandar", featuring Emiway and Sunidhi Chauhan was released on October 12, 2026.

== Release ==
The film was initially set to release theatrically on 7 August 2026. But the makers of the film Maddock Films had postponed the release to avoid a box office clash with Batwara 1947 and Awarapan 2 as both films had a release date of 14 August 2026. Later, a date of 4 September 2026 was also in consideration for its theatrical release.

On 13 August 2026, Maddock Films announced a new release date for the film as 16 October 2026.

== Reception ==
On the review aggregator website Rotten Tomatoes, 73% of 15 critics' reviews are positive, with an average rating of 6.5/10.

Reviewers identified the film as either a legal drama, a courtroom drama, a dramatic biopic, a biopic, a drama or a family saga.

While Devesh Sharma believed the narrative to be "rooted in the legal battle," Rishabh Suri, on the other hand, argued that the subplots involving Nikam's family occupied "more screen time" than they warranted. Similarly, Sana Farzeen found herself frustrated with the "stop-start narrative" that rises just when one begins settling into the story, "only to drop again." Though, the dialogues had "their moments" for her. Sharma went even further, saying that the dialogues were the "principal vehicle of the drama".

While Sharma praised Rao for effectively conveying Nikam's "tenacity, confidence and combative courtroom presence", Rahul Desai made note that his decent performance didn't reduce the role to a "slew of imitations." Though, to Farzeen his performance appeared "too manufactured", so intent on embodying Nikam's mannerisms that the performance began to "look like an act." While Gabbi got the body language of an ageing woman "spot on" according to Suri, and brought "sensitivity to her role" according to Sharma, Farzeen believed that her "stiff expressions and mannerisms" made her portrayal feel "more performed than lived-in."

Ahlawat left a mark for Shubhra Gupta, and made a "strong impression" on Farzeen. Kher was "simply too good" for Suri, and made an "effective foil" to Rao in the courtroom sequences, per Sharma. Vidyarthi made his presence felt to Suri, and Gupta, too, was pleased with his appearance. She also found Prabhakar believable as a villain "through a range of emotions—from sly cruelty to straight-up lying and evasion during his trial, to the growing awareness of his crime as he waits in his cell." Sharma also found him convincing. Though, Suri found him "effective in parts". Sahore got his "moment in the sun", according to Sharma, while Diorr Varghese came off as brilliant to Farzeen as a 10-year-old victim who testified against Kasab.

Sharma thought that the film did not allow patriotism to "slip into jingoism", and that it's focus remained "on the judicial process rather than turning the courtroom into a platform for chest-thumping nationalism." Similarly, Gupta pointed out the feast scene between Nikam and Ali, and remarked how the film refused "to take refuge in jingoism", and that it made the carnage "a crime against humanity, not just reducing it to a religious divide." She also found the scene of Kasab asking the prison guard, "Eid is celebrated here?" to be "a nice, if familiar touch." In contrast, Desai regarded it as succumbing to old cinematic habits in that the foreign villain is "humbled and guilted by the goodness of India." However, he found Kasab's mental deterioration to be an interesting choice, "given how readily mainstream cinema flattens the depiction of evil." Though, for Soori, it was an "unnecessary dramatic detour" that added little to the larger narrative. The background score "milks every moment" according to Desai.
