= Ajeeb (TV series) =

- Created by: Bonnie Jain
- Directed by: Tabrez Khan
- Starring: See below
- Country of origin: India
- Original language: Hindi

Production
- Executive producer: Ajit Manerikar
- Producer: Bonnie Jain
- Editor: Manish Mistry
- Camera setup: Multi-camera
- Running time: Approx. 25 minutes

Original release
- Network: 9X
- Release: 27 August 2008 – November 2008

Ajeeb - The Other Side is an Indian Hindi-language television series that on aired on 9X TV channel. The series set in a hospital where something strange is always going on.

== Cast ==
- Aarti Thakur as Anjali Verma
- Vishal Watwani as Dr. Dev Malhotra
- Manish Goel as Anthony
- Shweta Tiwari
- Sakshi Tanwar
- Varun Badola
- Shruti Seth
- Payal Nair

== Awards ==
Ajeeb received the Jury award for Best Thriller at the 8th Annual Indian Television Academy Awards in 2008.
