= Lover (2022 film) =

2022 Indian Punjabi-language film

- Film poster
- Directed by: Dilsher Singh & Khushpal Singh
- Written by: Taj
- Produced by: KV Dhillon
- Starring: Guri; Ronak Joshi; Yashpal Sharma; Avtar Gill
- Edited by: Hardik
- Music by: Jass Manak and Babbu
- Production company: Geet MP3
- Distributed by: Geet MP3
- Release date: 1 July 2022
- Running time: 135 minutes
- Country: India
- Language: Punjabi

Lover is a 2022 Indian Punjabi-language film directed by Dilsher Singh & Khushpal Singh. The film is produced by KV Dhillon. It stars Guri, Ronak Joshi, Yashpal Sharma and Avtar Gill. The film theatrically released on 1 July 2022.

== Cast ==
- Guri as Lally
- Ronak Joshi as Heer
- Yashpal Sharma as Dilawar Singh
- Avtar Gill as Gupta
- Rupinder Rupi as Heer's mother
- Karan Sandhiwalia as Gopi
- Rahul Jaitly as Babban

== Production ==
Filming began on 24 August 2021 and completed on 29 September 2021.

== Reception ==
Kiddaan.com gave three out of five stars, stating that "A Musical Treat With An Average Story But Commendable Performances". Decodecinema gave 0 out of 5 stars stating that "a cheap story with a cheap plot, a cheap direction and a cheap writing and this movie is for 'bhoond ashiks' only"

== Soundtrack ==
Lover

Soundtrack album by Jass Manak, Guri, Atif Aslam, Rahat Fateh Ali Khan, Sachet Tandon, Asees Kaur
- Genre: Film soundtrack
- Label: Geet MP3
- Producer: Snipr and Sharry Nexus

=== Track list ===
All music is composed by Snipr and Sharry Nexus.

Track Listing
| No. | Title | Artist | Length |
|---|---|---|---|
| 1. | "Lover (title)" | Sachet Tandon | 00:04:26 |
| 2. | "Kitna Chahe" | Jass Manak, Asees Kaur | 00:02:53 |
| 3. | "Rangreza" | Atif Aslam | 00:03:33 |
| 4. | "Tere Bina" | Rahat Fateh Ali Khan | 00:03:37 |
| 5. | "Marke" | Jass Manak | 00:02:54 |
| 6. | "Kasam" | Hashmat Sultana | 00:03:50 |
| 7. | "Pyar Karda" | Jass Manak | 00:03:06 |
