= Guri (singer) =

Indian Singer and Actor

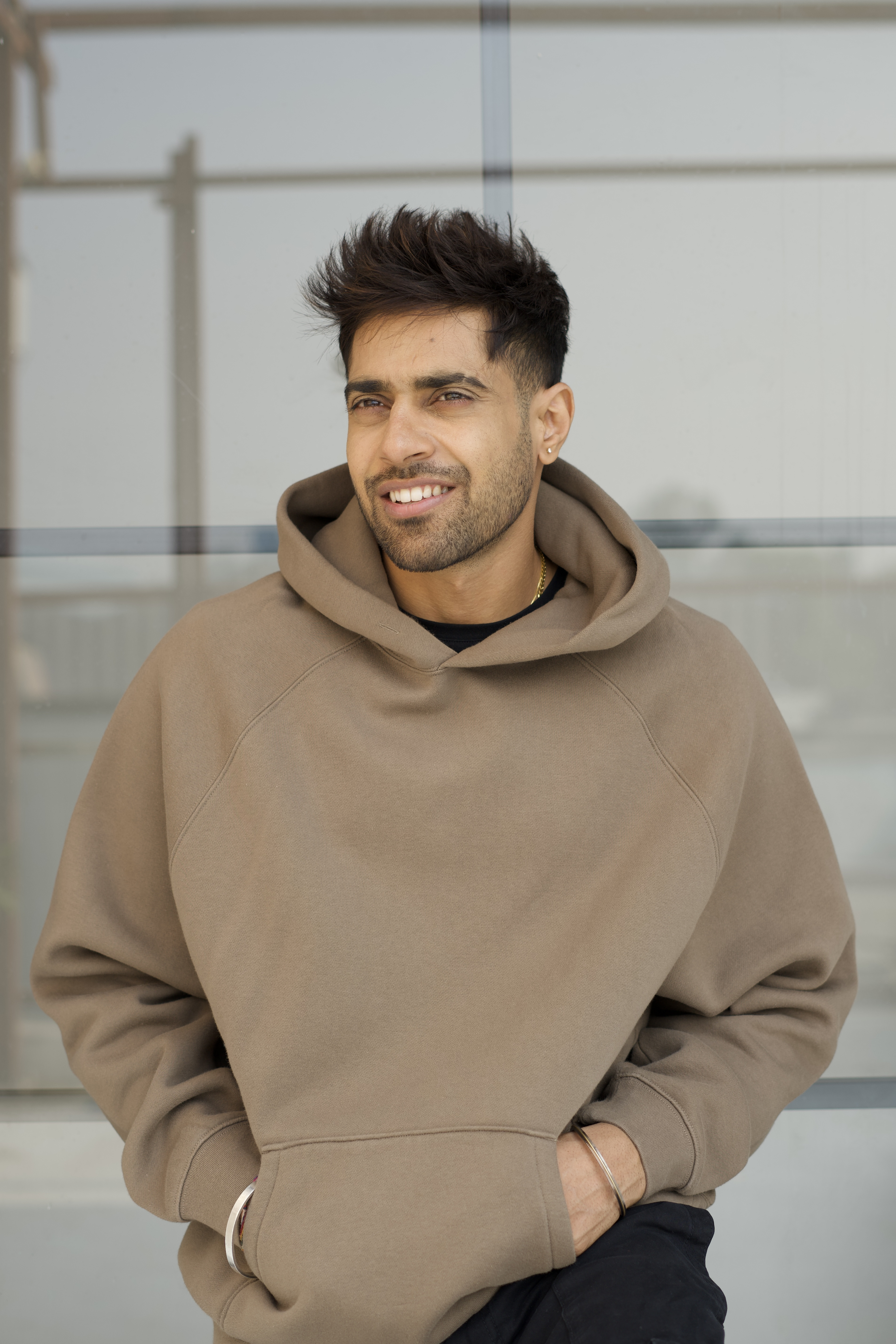
- Guri on set of Lover Movie

Background information
- Born: 24 November 1993 (age 32); Patiala, Punjab, India
- Occupations: Singer and actor
- Works: Sikander 2, Jatt Brothers, Lover, Tufang
- Years active: 2017–present
- Label: Geet MP3

Guri is an Indian singer and actor associated with Punjabi music and Punjabi cinema.

== Career ==
=== As a singer ===
Guri made his debut in singing with song "Yaar Beli". Later he released songs like "Jimmy choo choo", "Dooriyan", "Mil Lo Na", "Chootey Maatey", "Jatti" and "Bewafa Tu", which became commercial hits in Punjabi music industry. His song "Nira Ishq" also appeared in 2019 Apple Music India charts and song "Jatti" appeared in 2019 Gaana's top 50 Punjabi songs list.

=== As an actor ===
In 2019, Guri made his acting debut with movie Sikander 2.

In 2022, he acted as lead character in film Jatt Brothers with Jass Manak. He again played lead role in the film Lover, in the same year.

== Filmography ==
| Year | Title | Role | Notes |
|---|---|---|---|
| 2019 | Sikander 2 | Lead | Debut Film |
| 2022 | Jatt Brothers | Lead | with Jass Manak |
| 2022 | Lover | Lead | with Ronak Joshi |
| 2023 | Tufang | Lead | with Rukshar Dhillon |
