= Satyameva Jayate 2 =

2021 Indian film by Milap Zaveri

- Theatrical release poster
- Directed by: Milap Zaveri
- Written by: Milap Zaveri
- Produced by: Bhushan Kumar; Krishan Kumar; Monisha Advani; Madhu Bhojwani; Nikkhil Advani
- Starring: John Abraham; Divya Khosla Kumar
- Cinematography: Dudley
- Edited by: Maahir Zaveri
- Music by: Score: Sanjoy Chowdhury; Songs: Arko Pravo Mukherjee; Rochak Kohli; Tanishk Bagchi; Payal Dev; Jass Manak
- Production companies: T-Series Films; Emmay Entertainment
- Distributed by: AA Films
- Release date: 25 November 2021
- Running time: 138 minutes
- Country: India
- Language: Hindi
- Budget: ₹95 crore
- Box office: ₹17.29 crore

Satyameva Jayate 2 is a 2021 Indian Hindi-language vigilante action film written and directed by Milap Zaveri with production by T-Series and Emmay Entertainment. The second and final installment of duology. It is a spiritual sequel of the 2018 film Satyameva Jayate and stars John Abraham in a triple role as a father, a Social Activist named Dadasaheb Balram Azad and his twin sons named Home Minister Satya Balram Azad and ACP Jay Balram Azad IPS, alongside Divya Khosla Kumar, Rajeev Pillai and Anup Soni. In the film, Satya Balram Azaad proposes Lokpal bill in the parliament but due to lack of votes his plea gets rejected, years ago his father Dadasaheb Balram Azad had sacrificed his life for the same which also left his mother Suhasini in coma.A killer starts to kill corrupt people in the city to stop corruption so the officials decide to appoint a tough cop Jay Balram Azad twin brother of Satya Balram Azad forms rest of the plot.

The release date was postponed due to rise in COVID-19 cases.

Satyameva Jayate 2 was released on 25 November 2021 and received mixed-to-negative reviews from critics. Unlike the first film, it was a box office failure.

== Plot ==
Satya Balram Azad is the Home Minister of Uttar Pradesh, who secretly commits gruesome vigilante killings in order to provide justice to the oppressed. Due to ongoing killings, the police department assigns Satya's twin brother ACP Jay Balram Azad to investigate the case. Jay begins his investigation, where it is revealed that Jay is also involved with his brother in the killings. Later, Satya and Jay's mother Suhasini Devi Azad wakes up from her coma and reveals that Satya's wife Vidya Maurya's father and the present-CM Chandra Prakash Maurya was behind the death of their father Dadasahab Balram Azad, a patriotic farmer who fought for the rights of the people. After a heavy battle, Satya and Jay manages to kill Chandra Prakash, where they secretly continue their vigilante activities.

== Cast ==
- John Abraham in a triple role as
  - Social Activist Dadasaheb Balram Azad, Satya and Jay's father
  - Home Minister Satya Balram Azad, Dadasaheb's elder son and Jay's twin brother
    - Shubh Saxena as Young Satya
  - ACP Jay Balram Azad IPS, Dadasaheb's younger son and Satya's twin brother
    - Shresthdeep Saxena as Young Jay
- Divya Khosla Kumar as MLA Vidya Maurya Azad, Satya's wife
- Harsh Chhaya as CM Chandra Prakash Maurya, Vidya's father
- Anup Soni as DCP Subodh Upadhyay IPS
- Gautami Kapoor as Suhasini Devi Azad
- Sahil Vaid as Inspector Gyaneswar Chaurasia
- Zakhir Hussain as Minister Shankar Prasad
- Rituraj Singh as Madan Lal Joshi
- Rajendra Gupta as Daya Kaka
- Bhagyashree Limaye as a Doctor
- Shaad Randhawa as Sardara
- Daya Shankar Pandey as Parag Tripathi
- Salim Shah as Yashwant Paswan
- Devaksh Rai as Doctor Colleague

=== Cameo appearance ===
- Jass Manak as Himself performing his song "Tenu Lehanga" at a function
- Nora Fatehi in the song "Kusu Kusu"

== Production ==
Principal photography for Satyameva Jayate 2 commenced on 20 October 2020 in Lucknow, before moving to Mumbai and Raebareli. Filming wrapped up in the last week of January 2021 in Mumbai.

== Soundtrack ==
Satyameva Jayate 2

Soundtrack album by Arko, Rochak Kohli, Tanishk Bagchi, Payal Dev and Jass Manak
- Released: 23 November 2021
- Recorded: 2020–21
- Genre: Feature film soundtrack
- Length: 23:22
- Language: Hindi
- Label: T-Series

Official audio
- Satyameva Jayate 2 - Full Album on YouTube

The film's music was composed by Arko, Rochak Kohli, Tanishk Bagchi, Payal Dev and Jass Manak while lyrics written by Manoj Muntashir, Rashmi Virag, Tanishk Bagchi and Jass Manak.

The first song "Meri Zindagi Hai Tu" is a remake from Nusrat Fateh Ali Khan's song with same name. Lyrics by Nasir Kazmi.

The song "Tenu Lehanga" is a remake of the 2019 Punjabi song "Lehanga" by Jass Manak.

The song "Kusu Kusu" is a remake of Islamic song "Muhammad Nabina".

Track listing
No.	Title	Lyrics	Music	Singer(s)	Length
1.	"Meri Zindagi Hai Tu"	Manoj Muntashir	Rochak Kohli	Jubin Nautiyal, Neeti Mohan	4:44
2.	"Tenu Lehanga"	Tanishk Bagchi, Jass Manak	Tanishk Bagchi, Jass Manak	Zahrah S Khan, Jass Manak	4:07
3.	"Kusu Kusu"	Tanishk Bagchi, Rashmi Virag	Tanishk Bagchi	Zahrah S Khan, Dev Negi	3:15
4.	"Jann Gann Mann"	Manoj Muntashir	Arko	B Praak	4:51
5.	"Maa Sherawali"	Manoj Muntashir	Payal Dev	Payal Dev, Sachet Tandon	4:13
6.	"Jann Gann Mann" (Reprise)	Manoj Muntashir	Arko	Arko	2:12
Total length:					23:22

== Release ==
In April 2021, the release date of film was postponed due to a rise in COVID-19 cases. Finally, the film was released on 25 November 2021.

== Reception ==
=== Box office ===
Satyameva Jayate 2 earned ₹3.22 crore at the box office on its opening day. On the second day, the film collected ₹1.92 crore. On the third day, the film collected ₹2.12 crore. On the fourth day, the film collected ₹2.50 crore, with the total domestic opening weekend collection becoming ₹9.76 crore.

As of 16 December 2021, the film grossed ₹15.79 crore in India and ₹1.50 crore overseas, for a worldwide gross collection of ₹17.29 crore.

=== Critical response ===
The film received negative reviews from critics. Bollywood Hungama gave the film a rating of 4/5 and wrote, ‘‘Satyameva Jayate 2 is a power packed mass entertainer with entertaining moments and bravura performance by John Abraham’’. Hiren Kotwani of The Times of India gave the film a rating of 3/5 and wrote, ‘‘If you enjoy the massy masala fare of the bygone era and are willing to take on thrice as much of John Abraham in one frame, you can go indulge in this one’’. Murtuza Nullwala of Eastern Eye gave the film a rating of 2/5 and wrote, ‘‘Satyameva Jayate 2 is an outdated film and doesn’t entertain much’’. Anupama Chopra of Film Companion wrote, ‘‘Satyameva Jayate 2 starts with a visual of the Tricolor and then over the next 138 minutes, the film batters us with ear-splitting background music, grotesque visuals, feeble dialogues that are desperate to land punches and superbly hammy acting’’. Sonil Dedhia of News 18 criticized the film by calling its script ‘‘Tacky’’ and wrote, ‘‘My biggest question is why did the producers decide to put their hard-earned money into this project when Zaveri is known to make the tackiest of films’’. Tatsam Mukherjee of Firstpost gave the film a rating of 0/5 and wrote, ‘‘Satyamev Jayate 2 is an ugly exhibition of appeasement filmmaking, where a director is trying to tick off as many boxes of the audience he can appease, using the most tired tropes in the history of Hindi cinema’’.

Shubhra Gupta from The Indian Express gave the film a rating of 0.5/5 and wrote, ‘‘Abraham strides through this thing with his standard mix of fixed-frown-and-swinging-fists. Only once or twice does he do the bare-bodied superhero who can take on all comers with a teeny dimpled nudge-wink. The rest is a string of tired stereotypes and bad story-telling, refreshing the dangerous idea of justice being doled out by men arrogating to themselves the power to judge, jury, executioner’’. Saibal Chatterjee from NDTV gave the film a rating of 1/5 and criticized the soundtrack, dialogues and the characters of the film by writing, ‘‘The soundtrack is shoddy and ear-splitting. The dialogues are clearly the handiwork of a third-rate rhymester. The characters do not speak, they howl’’. He further stated, ‘‘The shoddy cinematic qualities are only one aspect of Satyameva Jayate 2; The film also peddles dangerous ideas about instant justice and patriotism. No Hindi film in living memory has misused the tricolour as brazenly as Satyameva Jayate 2 does; The film invokes the national flag for the purpose of justifying extra-judicial means of punishing the corrupt. In the bargain, all that it does is sully the fair reputation of the world's largest democracy’’. Monika Rawal Kukreja of Hindustan Times called Satyameva Jayate 2 a ‘‘loud, screeching, bloated mess’’ and a ‘‘film no one should have to tolerate’’. She wrote, ‘‘There's not even a single person that's talking in this film. Everyone is shouting, screaming and yelling at the top of their lungs, leaving your eardrums craving for some calm. Satyameva Jayate 2 is a shoddy and sloppy depiction of jingoism and vigilantism at its most shameless’’.

Stutee Ghosh from The Quint gave the film a rating of 1/5 and wrote, ‘‘Satyameva Jayate 2 is all noise and no substance’’. She further stated, ‘‘Satyameva Jayate 2 is mind-bogglingly, excruciatingly loud, on-the-nose, screechy and melodramatic’’. Syed Firdaus Ashraf of Rediff gave the film a rating of 1.5/5 and criticized its script by stating, ‘‘Satyamev Jayate 2 has a dated circa 1990s script which won't find acceptance with today's generations’’. He further wrote, ‘‘The only saving grace in the film is a passable item song Kusu Kusu performed by Nora Fatehi’’. Anuj Kumar from The Hindu wrote, ‘‘Despite being soaked in blood and tears, the cases of injustice have been so mechanically handled that they fail to evoke any empathy for the characters; So much so that even references to the secular fabric of society and women’s safety sound gratuitous’’. Nandini Ramnath from Scroll wrote, ‘‘The director Zaveri throws everything in his powers at his barren canvas. The dialogue is screamed rather than spoken and competes with the blaring background music. By shooting the same scene from ten angles and deploying rapid zooms and editing gimmicks, Zaveri hopes that the rampant tackiness will not be apparent’’.
