= Jatt Brothers =

- Directed by: Manav Shah
- Written by: Dheeraj Rattan
- Screenplay by: Dheeraj Rattan
- Story by: Dheeraj Rattan
- Based on: Comedy Drama
- Produced by: KV Dhillon
- Starring: Guri; Jass Manak; Nikeet Dhillon; Priyanka Khera
- Cinematography: Akshdeep Pandey
- Music by: Jass Manak
- Production company: Geet MP3
- Distributed by: Geet MP3
- Release date: 25 February 2022
- Running time: 135 min
- Country: India
- Language: Punjabi

Jaat Brothers is a 2022 Indian Punjabi-language film. It stars Guri, Jass Manak and Nikeet Dhillon. The film is directed by Manav Shah and produced by Kv Dhillon. Initially scheduled to be released on 9 July 2021, the release was postponed due to the COVID-19 pandemic in India. The film was released on 25 February 2022.

== Cast ==
- Guri as Jaggi
- Jass Manak as Pamma
- Nikeet Dhillon as Jyot
- Priyanka Khera as Monika
- Anita Devgan
- Swaalina as Tina
- Jayy Randhawa as Lover (Special Appearance)

== Production ==
The film was shot in January 2020 and was announced later in the year.

== Soundtrack ==
The soundtrack of Jatt Brothers was released on 25 February 2022 by Geet MP3. The soundtrack consists of six songs, featuring vocals by Guri, Jass Manak and Simar Kaur. The music was composed by Rajat Nagpal and MixSingh.

Track listing
| No. | Title | Singer(s) | Music |
|---|---|---|---|
| 1 | "London" | Guri, Jass Manak, Simar Kaur | Rajat Nagpal |
| 2 | "Gaani" | Guri | Rajat Nagpal |
| 3 | "Yaar Mera" | Jass Manak | MixSingh |
| 4 | "Chandigarh" | Jass Manak, Guri | Rajat Nagpal |
| 5 | "Lamborghini" | Jass Manak | MixSingh |
| 6 | "Yaara" | Guri | Rajat Nagpal |
