= Sikander 2 =

2019 film by Manav Shah

- Official Poster of Sikander 2
- Directed by: Manav Shah
- Written by: Dheeraj Rattan; Gurpreet Bhullar
- Screenplay by: Dheeraj Rattan
- Produced by: KV Dhillon; Swapan Monga; Khushwinder Parmar; Anmol Monga
- Starring: Guri; Kartar Cheema; Sawan Rupowali; Shubh Sandhu; Nikeet Dhillon
- Cinematography: Akshdeep Pandey
- Edited by: Bharat S Rawat
- Music by: Amar Mohile
- Production companies: Geet MP3; Monga Brothers
- Distributed by: White Hill Studios
- Release date: 2 August 2019
- Running time: 131 minutes
- Country: India
- Language: Punjabi

Sikander 2 is an Indian Punjabi-language action film directed by Manav Shah and written by Dheeraj Rattan. It stars Kartar Cheema, Guri and Sawan Rupowali in lead roles. The film was released theatrically on 2 August 2019. It is a sequel to Jatinder Mauhar's 2013 political action film Sikander with Cheema reprising his role, another sequel titled Sikander 3, starring Cheema, is in the works.

== Plot ==
When his adoptive brother flees after running afoul of a vicious gang, Sikander attempts to locate him. After leaving his dark past behind, Sikander starts afresh in a distant village, where he is welcomed by a loving family as one of their own. However, when the only son of the family gets mixed with the wrong crowd and finds his life in danger, Sikander is left with no choice but to return to his old ways in order to save the youngster.

== Cast ==
- Kartar Cheema as Teji, whose nickname is Sikander
- Guri as Balli
- Sawan Rupowali as Kiran
- Nikeet Dhillon as Bindu
- Shubh Sandhu as Jodha
- Rahul Jungral as Lakha
- Manjit Singh as Shimla

== Soundtrack ==
Sikander 2

Soundtrack album by Jass Manak, Karan Aujla, Sidhu Moose Wala, Guri, Himmat Sandhu
- Released: June 2019
- Genre: Feature film soundtrack
- Length: 16:04
- Label: Geet MP3

Track listing
No.	Title	Singer(s)	Length
1.	"Sikander"	Karan Aujla	2:58
2.	"Bandook"	Jass Manak	2:57
3.	"Hathyar"	Sidhu Moose Wala	3:08
4.	"Rabb Wangu"	Jass Manak	2:25
5.	"Door Ho Geya"	Guri	3:28
6.	"Zorawar Jatt"	Himmat Sandhu	2:18
Total length:			16:04

== Accolades ==
At PTC Punjabi Film Awards 2020, the film received the most nominations (13 nominations), including Critics Award for Best Film, Best Actor Critics' (for Kartar Cheema), and Best Direction (for Manav Shah).
