= Token (rapper) =

American rapper (born 1998)

- Token in 2022

Background information
- Born: Benjamin David Goldberg; September 24, 1998 (age 28); Marblehead, Massachusetts, U.S.
- Genres: Hip-hop; alternative hip-hop
- Occupations: Rapper; singer; songwriter; producer
- Years active: 2010–present
- Labels: Never Too Different/Atlantic; MNRK
- Website: nevertoodifferent.com

Benjamin David Goldberg (born September 24, 1998), known professionally as Token, is an American rapper, singer, and record producer from Salem, Massachusetts.

Token gained a massive following after appearing on Sway’s Friday's Fire Cipher and has a catalog of videos on YouTube. He signed a distribution deal with Atlantic Records in 2020 and has since released three studio albums, Pink Is Better (2022), I'm Not Supposed to Be Here (2025) and I’m Leaving Soon (2026).

== Early life ==
Ben Goldberg was born and raised in Marblehead, Massachusetts. He was introduced to hip-hop music at age six by his sister. His mother, Leslie Goldberg, described him as having incidents of "explosive anger". In his younger years, Goldberg was often sent home from school by his teachers because of this. Additionally, he had difficulty in understanding expressive language. Goldberg was eventually diagnosed with depression and anxiety. As a child, Goldberg suffered from obesity, weighing nearly 140 pounds in the fourth grade. He began running on the treadmill after school and lost 50 pounds halfway through fifth grade as a result.

At a young age, Goldberg had a dream of becoming a hip-hop star; a psychiatrist noted that it seemed to be the only thing on his mind. An outlet for Goldberg was writing poetry in his diary, which eventually evolved into writing rap songs at the age of 10. Ben rapped in public for the first time at age 13, specifically in front of one of his idols at the time - Hopsin; who had just finished a show in a downstairs venue at The Middle East in Cambridge. Token recalled being brave and confident, which garnered the attention of rapper Hopsin and a crowd of 30 or so other fans surrounding him. After he finished his freestyle, Hopsin had a few words of advice for the young prodigy on how to "steez it out more" with his performances, as well as have more fun with them. Nonetheless, Hop was impressed - as it would spark a future bond and tour opening spot for Token later on in his career. According to Goldberg, the main artists he listened to were 2Pac, Ludacris, and Eminem.

== Career ==
=== 2012–2014: Career beginnings ===
Goldberg first began rhyming under the name BDG (his initials). He began uploading his content on YouTube after a childhood friend discovered music that he had recorded and encouraged him to create a channel to gain a following. His first song was a freestyle to "Party in the USA" by Miley Cyrus. The students at his school reacted negatively towards his work, but he began building a fanbase online. In the sixth grade, Goldberg started collaborating with his friend Colin Mitchell, a local emcee known as C-Mitch. Their first project was Lethal Combination. While the reception from the public was generally negative as well, one of the duo's CDs ended up in the possession of producer Jon Glass, who saw their potential and became a mentor to them.

Goldberg later adopted the stage name Token, which came out of feeling different from other emcees as a white Jewish kid from Marblehead. He started uploading his music videos through YouTube when he was 14. He released his debut mixtape, The Mindstate, in February 2014.

=== 2015–2016: "No Sucka MCs" and early success ===
In October 2015, Token released a video of himself rhyming while walking through a Marblehead neighborhood for the "No Sucka MCs" hip-hop contest. The video amassed over 500,000 views in just three days. It gained the attention of several celebrities, including Fred Durst, Mark Wahlberg, and T-Pain. Soon, Token became friends with Wahlberg, who began inviting him to his house in Los Angeles. In April 2016, he appeared on the radio show Sway in the Morning, on which he performed a freestyle over the beat of Lil Wayne's "Believe Me". His performance brought co-host Tracy G to tears. The video of his appearance went viral, which earned him further recognition. Token performed a free hip-hop show presented by Wahlberg in May 2016, which was filmed for Wahlberg's reality TV show Wahlburgers. Wahlberg also helped Token earn a role in the film Patriots Day, of Dzhokhar Tsarnaev's college roommate (Andrew Dwinells of UMass Dartmouth). On September 23, 2016, Token released his second mixtape Eraser Shavings. The song "Exception" from the mixtape has reached millions of streams. Token also first started touring in 2016, beginning in Europe.

=== 2017–2019: Singles and Between Somewhere ===
From January 2017 to mid-2018, Token consecutively released non-album singles and videos through YouTube, including "Doozy", "Patty Cake" and "Code Red", all three of which amassed millions of streams and views on YouTube. In August 2018, Token released his song "Flamingo", the lead single from his third mixtape Between Somewhere, which was released on December 7, 2018. Between Somewhere features guest vocals from IDK and Bas and was rated 3.3 out of 5 stars in a HipHopDX review. Token also collaborated with Tech N9ne in a bonus track from the mixtape, "YouTube Rapper". In 2019, Token signed with eOne Music.

=== 2020–2024: Signing with Atlantic Records and Pink Is Better ===
In 2020, Goldberg founded his own label, Never Too Different, and signed a distribution deal for his label with Atlantic Records. In August 2020, he released the single "30 People", his first song under the newly founded label. In July 2021, Goldberg announced that he had directed a music video for Lil Xan, though as of 2023 the track and video have not been released by either artist.

Token's third studio album Pink Is Better was released on January 14, 2022. The release of his album was preceded by four singles, two solo tracks ("Chit Chat" and "Sip"), "High Heels", featuring Rico Nasty, and "IOD", featuring Lil Skies.

In 2022, Token released several singles, including "I Was In Hollywood", "A Prayer", "Ain't It Funny", "Toy Story", and "Sister". In 2023, Token released several different singles and an EP; this includes "Rockabye Baby", "Mayflower", "Rookie" (featuring Suave Lee), "That's Why They Look", "Goldy", and "Knot". Token's EP Knot was released in November 2023 and consists of his singles "Knot", "Goldy", "That's Why They Look", "Rookie", and "Mayflower". The EP includes a blend of Boston hip-hop, rap, indie pop, and drift phonk.

In 2024, Token was featured in Young Posse's song "Young Posse Up" featuring Verbal Jint and NSW Yoon. That year, he released the singles "Why Would U Wanna Breakup?", "Lasersight", "Melancholy Dreams", "Building 7", and the viral "Hawk Tuah Freestyle".

=== 2025–present: I'm Not Supposed to Be Here ===
Token's fourth studio album, I'm Not Supposed to Be Here, was released on June 13, 2025. It was preceded by the singles "Feral", "Duck Hunter", and "Jeep" (featuring Terror Reid). The album serves as a personal reflection on Token's journey, exploring feelings of not fitting in, dealing with unexpected challenges, and finding ways to cope with loss and disappointment. He has stated that the album aims to resonate with others who have felt similar feelings and to offer fans a sense of understanding and connection. The album features guest appearances from Ren, Marco Plus, Steven Rodriguez, Terror Reid, and Tech N9ne.

In 2026, Token worked on the songs "Destiny-Mann Atkeya" & "Aari Aari", on the soundtrack of the Hindi-language film, Dhurandhar: The Revenge. He also released the singles "Methane Gas", "Cut It Off", "Mercedes", and "Bambi", partnering with Terror Reid and Diggy Graves on "Mercedes" and Connor Price on "Bambi". He also featured on the Emiway Bantai single "Sadak 2.0". His fifth studio album I'm Leaving Soon was released on July 24th, 2026.

== Discography ==
=== Studio albums ===
Title	Album details
Eraser Shavings	Released: September 23, 2016; Format: CD, digital download, streaming; Label: Self-released
Between Somewhere	Released: December 7, 2018; Format: CD, digital download, streaming; Label: Self-released
Pink Is Better	Released: January 14, 2022; Format: CD, digital download, streaming; Label: Never Too Different / Atlantic
I'm Not Supposed to Be Here	Released: June 13, 2025; Format: CD, digital download, streaming; Label: Never Too Different
I'm Leaving Soon	Released: July 24, 2026; Format: CD, digital download, streaming; Label: Never Too Different

=== Mixtapes ===
Title	Mixtape details
The Mindstate	Released: February 1, 2014; Format: Streaming, CD; Label: Self-released

=== Singles ===
==== As lead artist ====
Song	Year	Album(s)
"Waist Down"	2016	Eraser Shavings
"Happiness"	2016	Eraser Shavings
"Mass Reform"	2016	Eraser Shavings
"Doozy"	2017	Non-album singles
"New Problems"	2017	Non-album singles
"Dirty Flesh"	2017	Non-album singles
"Patty Cake"	2017	Non-album singles
"Little Boy"	2017	Non-album singles
"Still Believe in Heroes"	2018	Non-album singles
"Code Red"	2018	Non-album singles
"One Like Equals"	2018	Non-album singles
"Flamingo"	2018	Between Somewhere
"Mom Would Agree"	2018	Between Somewhere
"Treehouse"	2018	Between Somewhere
"Run It Back"	2019	Non-album singles
"No Game"	2019	Non-album singles
"Curfew"	2020	Non-album singles
"30 People"	2020	Non-album singles
"Dentures"	2021	Non-album singles
"Chit Chat"	2021	Pink Is Better
"Sip"	2021	Pink Is Better
"High Heels" (featuring Rico Nasty)	2021	Pink Is Better
"IOD" (featuring Lil Skies and YKD Jah)	2021	Pink Is Better
"Boom" (featuring J.I.D)	2022	Pink Is Better
"I Was in Hollywood"	2022	Non-album singles
"A Prayer"	2022	Non-album singles
"Ain't It Funny"	2022	Non-album singles
"Toy Story"	2022	Non-album singles
"Sister"	2022	Non-album singles
"Rockabye Baby"	2023	Non-album singles
"Mayflower"	2023	Non-album singles
"Rookie"	2023	Non-album singles
"That's Why They Look"	2023	Non-album singles
"Goldy"	2023	Non-album singles
"Knot"	2023	Non-album singles
"Why Would U Wanna Breakup?"	2024	Non-album singles
"Lasersight" (with Sadfriendd and Ariis)	2024	Non-album singles
"Melancholy Dreams" (with YNG Martyr)	2024	Non-album singles
"Building 7"	2024	Non-album singles
"Hawk Tuah Freestyle"	2024	Non-album singles
"Loser"	2024	Non-album singles
"So, Trump..."	2024	Non-album singles
"Liar"	2024	Non-album singles
"Feral"	2025	I'm Not Supposed to Be Here
"Duck Hunter"	2025	I'm Not Supposed to Be Here
"Jeep" (featuring Terror Reid)	2025	I'm Not Supposed to Be Here
"What Does Your Love Look Like?" (featuring Ren)	2025	I'm Not Supposed to Be Here
"Methane Gas"	2026	I'm Leaving Soon
"Mercedes" (with Terror Reid & Diggy Graves)	2026	I'm Leaving Soon
"Bambi" (with Connor Price)	2026	I'm Leaving Soon
"Back Burner" (featuring Rj Pasin)	2026	I'm Leaving Soon
"Locomotive Pts. 1 & 2" (with Lil Darkie)	2026	I'm Leaving Soon
"RRN" (with Pouya)	2026	I'm Leaving Soon

==== As featured artist ====
Song	Year	Album(s)
"Young Posse Up" (Young Posse featuring Verbal Jint, NSW Yoon, and Token)	2024	Non-album single
" #SADAK 2.0 " (Emiway Bantai featuring Token)	2026	Non-album single

=== Film soundtracks ===
Year	Film	Language	Song	Music	Lyrics	Co-artist(s)	Ref.
2026	Dhurandhar: The Revenge	Hindi	"Aari Aari"	Shashwat Sachdev	Irshad Kamil, Bombay Rockers, Reble, Token	Bombay Rockers, Khan Saab, Jasmine Sandlas, Sudhir Yaduvanshi, Reble	
2026	Dhurandhar: The Revenge	Hindi	"Destiny – Mann Atkeya" (Co-composed by Nusrat Fateh Ali Khan)	Shashwat Sachdev	Token, Shah Hussain	Shashwat Sachdev, Vaibhav Gupta, Shahzad Ali, Token	
