= The Indrani Mukerjea Story: Buried Truth =

- Genre: True crime
- Directed by: Uraaz Bahl; Shaana Levy
- Starring: Anurita Jha; Samaksh Sudi; Vidhie Mukerjea; Vivek Kumar; Ranjeet Sangle
- Country of origin: India
- Original language: English
- No. of seasons: 1
- No. of episodes: 4

Production
- Producer: India Today Originals
- Production company: India Today Originals

Original release
- Network: Netflix
- Release: 29 February 2024

The Indrani Mukerjea Story: Buried Truth is a 2024 Indian true-crime documentary series directed by Uraaz Bahl and Shaana Levy, produced by India Today Originals, and released on Netflix. The four-part series explores the infamous Sheena Bora murder case, focusing on the perspective of Indrani Mukerjea, the prime accused, alongside interviews with family members, journalists, and legal experts. Premiering on February 29, 2024, after a court-ordered delay, the series delves into the complex family dynamics, media frenzy, and unresolved questions surrounding the 2012 disappearance and alleged murder of Sheena Bora.

== Synopsis ==
The documentary revisits the Sheena Bora murder case, which gained national attention in India following Bora’s disappearance on April 24, 2012. Initially reported as Indrani Mukerjea’s sister, Sheena was later revealed to be her daughter. In 2015, a burnt body discovered in Raigad, Maharashtra, was identified as Bora’s through DNA testing, leading to Mukerjea’s arrest alongside her driver Shyamvar Rai, ex-husband Sanjeev Khanna, and then-husband Peter Mukerjea. The series examines Mukerjea’s narrative, her rise as a media executive, and the allegations of murder, juxtaposed with testimonies from her daughter Vidhie Mukerjea, son Mikhail Bora, journalists, and lawyers. It incorporates archival footage, call recordings, and reenactments to explore the case’s sensationalism and its impact on Indian society.

== Cast ==
- Anurita Jha as Indrani Mukerjea
- Samaksh Sudi as Rahul Mukerjea
- Vidhie Mukerjea as herself, daughter of Indrani and Peter Mukerjea
- Vivek Kumar as Mikhail Bora as Son of Indrani Mukerjea
- Ranjeet Sangle as Mukerjea’s lawyer
- Sagar Sant as Sanjeev Khanna

== Production ==
=== Development ===
Directed by husband-and-wife duo Uraaz Bahl and Shaana Levy, the series was in development for five years. Bahl, a Mumbai-born real estate investor turned filmmaker, and Levy, a former actor and producer, previously collaborated on the documentary Ladies First (2017). The idea for The Indrani Mukerjea Story emerged from their fascination with the case’s twists and media coverage, which they described as a “stranger-than-fiction saga.” The filmmakers aimed to present a balanced view, incorporating multiple perspectives while focusing on Mukerjea’s account.

=== Legal challenges ===
The series faced legal scrutiny prior to its release. Originally scheduled for February 23, 2024, its premiere was delayed after the Central Bureau of Investigation (CBI), which is prosecuting the ongoing Sheena Bora case, sought a stay from the Bombay High Court, citing potential influence on the trial. On February 22, 2024, the court ordered Netflix to screen the series for CBI officials and deferred the release until a ruling on February 29, 2024, allowed its premiere.

== Release ==
The Indrani Mukerjea Story: Buried Truth premiered on Netflix on February 29, 2024, in English, Hindi, Tamil, and Telugu, following significant media attention due to its subject matter and legal proceedings.

== Reception ==
=== Critical response ===
The docu-series received mixed reviews from critics. The Hindu described it as a “feeble and stale echo” of the 2015 media coverage, arguing it offered little new insight beyond Mukerjea’s perspective. Similarly, Deccan Herald called it a “recap of the Sheena Bora murder case, nothing more,” criticizing its lack of investigative depth. In contrast, India Today highlighted its execution, calling it “juicier than fiction” due to Mukerjea’s bold statements, while Firstpost lauded its portrayal of Mukerjea’s ambition and eccentricity, noting its gripping narrative sparked varied online reactions. Scroll.in appreciated its sensationalism “delivered with a swish,” adding that Mukerjea’s portrayal oscillates between victim and villain.
