= M. L. Tahaliyani =

Indian judge

Lokayukta of Maharashtra
- Incumbent
- Assumed office 2015

Judge of the Bombay High Court
- In office 2011–2015

M. L. Tahaliyani is the Lokayukta of Maharashtra and is a retired judge of the Bombay High Court in India. Justice Tahaliyani presided over high-profile cases including the 2008 Mumbai attacks and the Adarsh Housing Society scam.

== Career ==
Born on 23 December 1953, in Sardarshahar, Rajasthan, Tahaliyani began his career as a lawyer in the Vidarbha region of Maharashtra in 1975. After a few years he was appointed as an assistant public prosecutor in the Naxal effected area of Gadchiroli, Sironcha, Desaiganj and Warora. After spending several years as a public prosecutor he was then appointed as a Metropolitan Magistrate in 1987. Tahaliyani was appointed the Additional Chief Metropolitan Magistrate in 1994 and later appointed the Chief Metropolitan Magistrate in 1997. In 2010 he was appointed as a Principal Judge to the Bombay City Civil Court and in that same year while presiding over the 2008 Mumbai attacks case he pronounced the death penalty to Ajmal Kasab on terrorism related charges, The judgement was later confirmed by the Bombay High Court and upheld by the Supreme Court of India after which Kasab was hanged at the Yerawada Central Jail, Pune on 21 November 2012. The following year Tahaliyani was appointed as a judge of the Bombay High Court and while presiding over the Adarsh Housing Society scam refused to give any relief to the former Chief minister of Maharashtra Ashok Chavan in that case. After his retirement from the bench, he was appointed Lokayukta of Maharashtra. Justice Tahaliyani succeeds Justice P.B. Gaikwad whose term as Lokayukta ended on 1 July 2014. Tahaliyani was sworn-in as the Lokayukta by Maharashtra Governor C. Vidyasagar Rao on 25 August 2015.
