= Jayy Randhawa =

Indian singer, actor

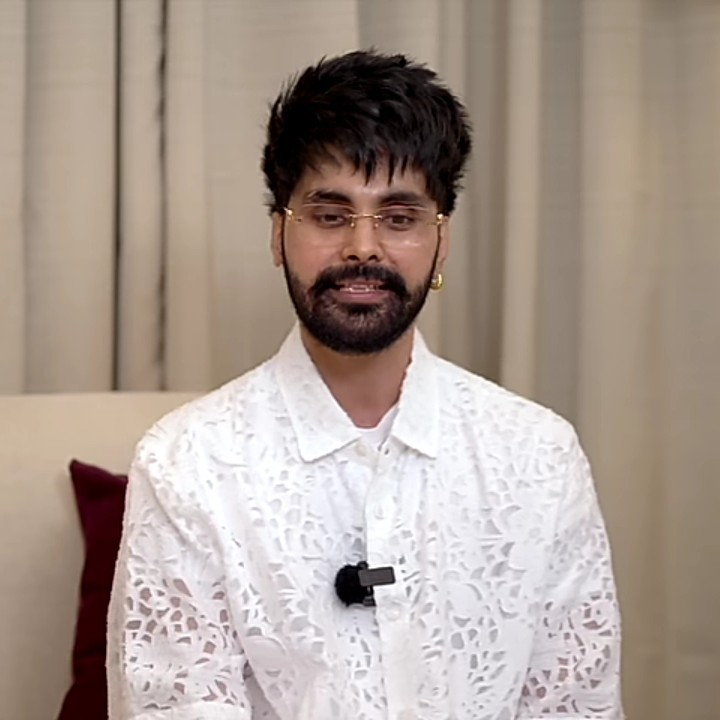
- Randhawa in 2025
- Born: Bikramjit Singh Randhawa
- Other name: B Jay Randhawa
- Occupations: Singer, Actor, Television presenter
- Years active: 2010-present
- Known for: Shooter (2022 film)
- Website: Jayy Randhawa on Instagram

Bikramjit Singh "Jayy" Randhawa is an Indian singer, actor and television presenter associated with Punjabi Music and Punjabi cinema. He started his career as TV presenter with "Tashan Da Pegg" on channel 9X Tashan. He is well known for his movie Shooter.

== Career ==
=== As television presenter ===
Randhawa was first recognised after auditioning for the reality show MTV Stuntmania in 2010. In 2012, he started his first TV show "Tashan Da Pegg" on channel 9X Tashan.

=== As singer ===
Randhawa released his debut single track "Theth Gabhru" in 2016.

=== As actor ===
Randhawa made his acting debut in Shooter (2022) which was banned but later released after two years.

== Discography ==
Song	Year	Lyrics	Music	Label
Theth Gabhru	2016	Deep Issar	JSL Singh	Malwa Records
Dil Di Awaz	2016	Jayy Randhawa	Deep Jandu	E3UK
Star (with Monica Gill)	2017	Jaani (songwriter)	Sukhe	Juke Dock
Deewana	2017	Raj	Ranjit	White Hill Music
8 Foot	2017	Amrit Maan	Gupz Shehra	TOB Gang
By God (ft.Karan Aujla)	2018	Karan Aujla	MixSingh	TOB Gang
Fitoor	2018	Jaani	B Praak	TOB Gang
Hello Friends	2018	Zaildar	Ranjit	TOB Gang
Nature	2019	Karan Aujla	MixSingh	TOB Gang
Goriye	2019	Kulshan Sandhu	Intense	GeetMp3

== Filmography ==
Film	Year	Role	Notes
Burrraahh	2012	Jeet	Guest appearance
Teeja Punjab	2021	Vicky	Guest appearance
. Shooter	2022	Sucha	Debut movie
Jatt Brothers	2022	Lover	Guest appearance
Chobbar	2022	Saabi	
Medal	2023	Raja	Lead Role
Je Jatt Vigad Geya	2024	Daler	
Badnaam	2024	Badshah	
Jaani Chor	TBA	TBA	

== TV shows ==
Show	Year	TV Channel
MTV Stuntmania	2010	MTV
Tashan Da Pegg	2012	9X Tashan
Box Cricket League - Punjab	2016	PTC Punjabi
