= 9X Jhakaas =

- Country: India
- Headquarters: Mumbai, Maharashtra, India

Programming
- Picture format: 576i (4:3) (SDTV)

Ownership
- Owner: 9X Media
- Sister channels: 9XM; 9XO; 9X Tashan; 9x Jalwa; 9X

History
- Launched: 31 October 2011; 14 years ago

Links
- Website: Official website

9X Jhakaas is the first Marathi music channel, broadcasting from Mumbai, Maharashtra, India. This channel was launched on 31 October 2011. It is now also available worldwide via the internet.

The channel is operated by 9X Media, which also operates the Hindi language music channel 9XM, another channel called 9X Jalwa, and the Punjabi music channel 9x Tashan.
