= Lexz Pryde =

American musician, dancer and model

Brittany Rose Peechatka, professionally known as Lexz Pryde, is an American recording artist, songwriter, dancer, model, and influencer from Pennsylvania.

== Career ==
Pryde released her first single “Motivate” featuring Snoop Dogg in 2016, which helped her gain a social media following and fan base. "Motivate" received air play from stations including WWPR in New York City, WPWX in Chicago, and WPGC in Washington D.C. Lexz Pryde sang the song for Reverend Al Sharpton and his National Action Network as part of their live broadcast on WLIB.

She has been on an international tour with Ultra both as a dancer and artist while also launching her own Anti-Bullying Tour and continuing to record new Music.

She modeled and performed at New York Fashion Week at the Bungalow 8 nightclub in New York City. Guests in attendance included Andy Hilfiger, Uncle Murda, Rohan Marley, Al B. Sure, and Felipe Lopez.

She opened for Snoop Dogg during his Holiday Tour and February 2016 Super Bowl Week Tour.

Lexz Pryde returned to Ultra Music Festival's Live Stage. This time performing alongside musical guests, Chief Keef, Nervo and DJ Los De La Vega.
