= 9x Jalwa =

Hindi music television channel

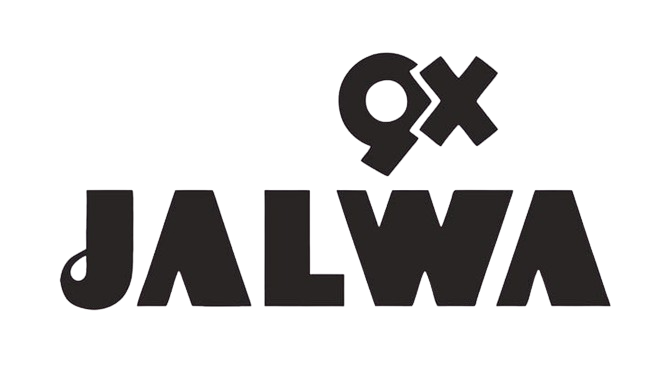
- 9x Jalwa logo
- Country: India
- Headquarters: Mumbai, Maharashtra

Programming
- Picture format: 4:3 (576i, SDTV)

Ownership
- Owner: 9X Media
- Sister channels: 9XO; 9X Jhakaas; 9X Tashan; 9XM; 9X

History
- Launched: 25 February 2012; 14 years ago

Links
- Website: www.9xjalwa.in

9x Jalwa is an Indian classic Hindi music television channel, broadcast in India. The channel is owned by 9X Media. 9x Jalwa is India's classic channel, and plays Indian music, which was released during 1990s to 2010s. It was launched in 2012.

9x Jalwa is part of 9X Media, India's classic music television network based in India. 9x Jalwa will be an encrypted but free to air channel. It airs older Hindi film music across India.

== List of programs ==
1. Melody Forever
2. Love forever
3. AskMona
4. Jalwa Superstars
5. Jalwa Superstars Classics
6. Star Tracks
7. Hits forever
