= 9XO =

Indian music television channel

9xO India
- Country: India
- Headquarters: Mumbai, Maharashtra, India

Programming
- Picture format: 4:3 (576i, SDTV)

Ownership
- Owner: 9X Media
- Sister channels: 9XM; 9X Jhakaas; 9X Tashan; 9x Jalwa; 9X

History
- Launched: 24 April 2012; 14 years ago
- Closed: 31 May 2020; 6 years ago

Links
- Website: www.9xo.in

9XO was an Indian English music television channel, broadcast in India based in Mumbai. The channel was owned by 9X Media, an Indian television broadcaster, owned by a consortium of private equity fund investors. It was launched in 2012.

As of September 2014, approximately 45,875,000 Indian households (67.54% of households with television) received 9xO.

9XO's programming was targeted at upscale urban youth, airing English and international music from across the globe. 9XO also provided a platform called OmeGrown for independent Indian music bands playing English music to showcase their talent. 9X Media decided to shut the broadcast operations of the channel at midnight on 31 May 2020, removing the service from all leading DTH and MSO platforms.

== Music festival ==
9xO presented the Sunburn Arena Music Festival, which included performances in Bengaluru and Mumbai by Swedish DJ and producer Axwell.
