= Tufang (film) =

- Official poster
- Directed by: Dheeraj Kedarnath Rattan
- Written by: Dheeraj Kedarnath Rattan
- Screenplay by: Dheeraj Kedarnath Rattan
- Produced by: KV Dhillon
- Starring: Guri; Rukshar Dhillon; Jagjeet Sandhu
- Production company: Geet MP3
- Distributed by: Geet MP3
- Release date: 21 July 2023
- Running time: 144 minutes
- Country: India
- Language: Punjabi

Tufang is a 2023 Punjabi-language film written and directed by Dheeraj Kedarnath Rattan. The film is produced by Geet MP3. It stars Guri, Rukshar Dhillon, and Jagjeet Sandhu in lead roles and Harpreet Bains, Baljinder Bains, Mahavir Bhullar and Karanveer Khullar in supporting roles. The film was released on 21 July 2023.

== Cast ==
- Guri
- Rukshaar Dhillon
- Jagjeet Sandhu
- Harpreet Bains
- Baljinder Bains
- Mahavir Bhullar
- Karanveer Khullar
- Arsh Hundal
- Harpreet Kaler
- Jasmin Kaur

== Production ==
Principal photography began in February 2023. The shooting of the film was wrapped up on 24 March 2023.

== Release ==
=== Theatrical and home media ===
Tufang was theatrically released on 21 July 2023. It was digitally released on Chaupal on 12 October 2023.
