= 9X Media =

Indian music television network

9x Media
- Type: Music television network Entertainment news online venture
- Country: India
- Founded: 2007; 19 years ago by Indrani Mukerjea
- Key people: Pradeep Guha (Managing Director)
- Former names: INX Network
- Official website: 9xmedia.in

9X Media is the largest Indian music broadcaster operating 4 music television channels and a Bollywood news portal, SpotboyE. The four music channels are 9XM (Latest Bollywood), 9X Jalwa (Evergreen Hindi), 9X Jhakaas (Marathi) and 9X Tashan (Punjabi).

== History ==
The company was founded by Indrani Mukerjea in 2007 through two companies, INX Media Pvt Ltd and INX News Pvt Ltd.

In March 2009, chairman & Chief Strategy Officer (CSO) Peter Mukerjea, and founder & CEO Indrani Mukerjea, left their management roles at INX Media.

In August 2010, INX Media renamed itself 9X Media as part of a restructuring process. It was planned to be acquired by Zee Entertainment Enterprises in October 2017 for the cost of ₹160 crore, however the plan fell through in March 2018.

In June 2020, the company shut down its English music network 9XO.

== Current stations ==
- 9XM is the flagship channel of 9X Media. Since its launch in 2007, 9XM has been a prominent Bollywood music channel. 9XM airs the latest Bollywood songs interspersed with rib-tickling animation. Its popular animation characters include "Bade Chote", "Bheegi Billi", "Badshah Bhai" and "Betel Nuts". "Bade Chote" of "Bakwaas Bandh Kar" fame entertain viewers with their jokes and funny messages.
- 9X Jalwa airs older Bollywood music songs. The channel also features Bollywood movie trivia through a series of short format shows and vignettes.
- 9X Tashan is the Punjabi music channel and a category leader since its launch in 2011. 9X Tashan, is targeted at free-spirited Punjabi viewers who take pride in everything related to Punjab.
- 9X Jhakaas is the first Marathi music channel. Targeted at the confident and go-getter Marathi Music lovers, 9X Jhakaas airs Marathi film & non-film songs.

== Former stations ==
- 9X: A general entertainment channel bought by ZEE and later shut down.
- 9XO: The company's contemporary English & International music channel. It ceased broadcasting on 1 June 2020.

== SpotboyE ==
SpotboyE is the companion website that celebrates Bollywood and is the destination for news, features and stories of Bollywood movies, stars and people associated with Bollywood.

In 2018, comedian Kapil Sharma sent a legal notice to the publication and its journalist Vickey Lalwani, demanding an unconditional public apology within seven days of receiving the notice and to "immediately withdraw the contents of all defamatory articles/publications on all forms of media targeting him".
