= Peter Mukerjea =

British television executive

- Born: 21 November 1956 (age 69); London, England
- Education: The Doon School; West Herts College
- Occupation: Television executive
- Years active: 1974–2009
- Known for: CEO, Star India (1997–2007)
- Spouse(s): Shabnam Mukerjea (m. 1975; div. 1994) Indrani Mukerjea (m. 2002; div. 2017)
- Children: 3
- Relatives: Sheena Bora (stepdaughter)

Peter Mukerjea (born 21 November 1956) is a British retired television executive. From 1997 to 2007 he was the CEO of STAR India. In 2007 he joined INX Media as chief strategy officer. He quit the company in 2009 and retired to Bristol.

In November 2015 he was arrested by the Central Bureau of Investigation in connection with the Sheena Bora murder case and had been in judicial custody at Mumbai Central Jail. In February 2016 he was formally charged under Indian Penal Code Sections 302 (murder), 120-B (conspiracy) and 201 (causing disappearance of evidence). He was released on bail on 20 March 2020. In February 2021 (15/2/2021) Peter's first book 'STARSTRUCK' - Confessions of a TV Executive - was published by Westland Amazon.

== Personal life ==
Mukerjea was born in London to Indian parents and raised in Mumbai, India. His father was a doctor. He graduated from the Doon School in Dehradun, India, in 1971. He attended college in UK. He took evening classes to study business management. He has a younger brother, Gautam Mukerjea, who runs a lifestyle magazine named Planet Goa.

Peter married Shabnam Singh in May 1978. The couple had two sons, Rabin (born 1980) and Rahul (born 1984), before divorcing in 1994. Rahul Mukerjea currently lives in Badripur near Dehradun with his mother.

Peter lived and worked in Mumbai while employed with STAR India. In 2000, he was named as the first Indian Tennessee Squire by Brown-Forman Corporation, the makers of Jack Daniel's whiskey.

In 2002 Alyque Padamsee introduced Peter to Indrani Bora, an HR consultant 16 years his junior. Later that year Peter married Indrani in a small wedding ceremony in friend Suhel Seth's garden house in New Delhi. After marriage, Indrani's daughter from a previous marriage, Vidhie Khanna, moved in with them and took the Mukerjea name. In 2005 Indrani introduced her children from a previous relationship, Sheena Bora and Mikhail Bora, to Peter as her younger siblings. In 2006 Sheena Bora moved in with them and enrolled in St. Xavier's College, Mumbai. In 2017 he divorced his second wife, Indrani Mukerjea.

== Career ==
Peter Mukerjea started his career in marketing with American food processing company Heinz and British retailer Storehouse plc in United Kingdom. He worked with the advertising agency Ogilvy & Mather as Account Director in New Delhi and London followed by a stint with DDB Needham as Regional Group Account Director in Hong Kong. In 1993 he joined STAR TV as Sales Director (India) in Hong Kong. He moved to Mumbai shortly after joining to establish STAR TV's advertising sales division in India. In 1996 Peter acquired additional responsibility for the Middle East market. In 1997 he was promoted to Executive Vice President. In 1999 he became Chief Executive Officer of STAR India and served in that position for 8 years. Peter represented Star TV's interests as a member of the Board of Directors of television channel ESPN STAR Sports, cable television service operator Hathway and joint venture company Media Content and Communications Services (India) for Star News.

In January 2007 Peter resigned from STAR India. The terms of his resignation included a non-compete clause that restricted him from joining a competing broadcast service for 6 months. Peter therefore took on the role of chairman of his wife Indrani Mukerjea's human resource company, INX Services Pvt. Ltd. After the expiry of the non-compete clause in July 2007, Peter joined INX Media, where he took on the role of chief strategy officer. He resigned from his position in 2009. By April 2010 he had sold his stake in the company. In May 2011, he resigned from his position on the board of directors of the company.

Peter has resigned as director at INX Executive Search Private Limited. He is an angel investor in Kratos, an on-demand digital advertisement platform.

== Legacy ==
Peter Mukerjea is considered one of the most successful executives in the history of Indian television industry. Under his leadership, STAR India was transformed from a loss-making operation into India's most-watched television channel with hit shows such as Balaji Telefilms' soap opera Kyunki Saas Bhi Kabhi Bahu Thi and host Amitabh Bachchan's quiz show Kaun Banega Crorepati. At STAR India, Peter forged and nurtured a team whose members have become senior media executives in their own right: Raj Nayak, Ajay Vidyasagar, Jagdish Kumar, Sameer Nair, Tarun Katial, Tony D'Silva, Sumantra Dutta, Anant Rangaswami, Yash Khanna, Seema Mohapatra, Monica Tata, Sunita Rajan, Vibhu Sharma and Rajnath Kamath.

India Today magazine listed Peter Mukerjea among the 50 most powerful people in India for 3 consecutive years from 2004 to 2006.

== Sheena Bora murder ==
In August 2015, Peter was questioned by Mumbai Police in connection with the alleged murder of Sheena Bora, his step daughter. He submitted a written statement to the police that was prepared in conjunction with his lawyer. He claimed that his passport was evidence that he was in Rome at the time of the murder in April 2012.

In November 2015 Peter was arrested by the Central Bureau of Investigation (CBI) for his alleged role in the murder conspiracy. He was kept in CBI custody for two weeks during which period he subjected to a polygraph test with his consent and in the presence of his lawyer. In December 2015 Peter was remanded to judicial custody in Mumbai Central Jail. CBI officials were granted multiple extensions to his judicial custody based on their contention that Peter and Indrani Mukerjea siphoned off money from INX Media and parked it in an offshore bank account in Sheena Bora's name. In February 2016 the CBI filed a chargesheet against him that charged him under Sections 302 (murder), 120-B (conspiracy) and 201 (causing disappearance of evidence) of the Indian Penal Code. On 20 March 2020, Peter was released from Mumbai Central Jail, six weeks after he was granted bail by the High Court and over 4.5 years after his initial arrest.
