= 9XM =

Indian satellite music channel

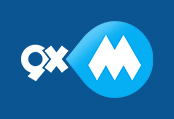
- Country: India
- Broadcast area: Worldwide
- Headquarters: Mumbai, Maharashtra, India

Programming
- Language(s): Hindi
- Picture format: 1080p (HDTV)

Ownership
- Owner: 9X Media
- Sister channels: 9XO; 9X Jhakaas; 9X Tashan; 9x Jalwa; 9X

History
- Launched: October 2007; 17 years ago

Links
- Website: www.9xm.in

Availability

Terrestrial
- D2M: 470-582 MHz

9XM is an Indian Hindi free-to-air music TV channel based in Mumbai. The channel is owned by 9X Media, an Indian television business. 9XM's programming is focused on Hindi-language music videos. The channel is available on all major dth platforms, including DD Free Dish. The channel is available on channel number 4 on DD Free Dish.

== International ==
In August 2008, 9XM launched as a free-to-air channel on Sky in the United Kingdom and Ireland. The following month, the channel was added to Freesat. 9XM was removed from Freesat on 27 August 2009 and from Sky on 24 December 2009, with the channel's Sky EPG slot purchased by Colors.

The channel returned to Sky and the UK market on 14 February 2012. On 12 October 2012, the channel closed once again citing technical difficulties, however their broadcast license had been revoked by Ofcom on 13 September following a failure to submit their returns. The channel returned on 8 November 2012.
