= 9X (TV channel) =

Indian Hindi Channel

9x
- 9X Logo
- Country: India
- Headquarters: Mumbai, Maharashtra, India

Ownership
- Owner: 9X Media (2007-2010); Zee Entertainment Enterprises (2010-2015)
- Sister channels: 9XO; 9XM; 9X Jhakaas; 9X Tashan; 9x Jalwa

History
- Launched: 12 November 2007; 18 years ago
- Closed: 2015; 11 years ago
- Replaced by: Ummah Channel

9X was an Indian Hindi general entertainment channel based in Mumbai. It is owned by Zee Entertainment Enterprises Ltd. (ZEEL). The channel was launched on 12 November 2007 in India as the flagship of the INX Network.

== History ==
=== Sale to Zee Enterprises ===
On 8 March 2010, it was reported that Zee Entertainment Enterprises Ltd. had made a bid of Rs 650 million for 9X, who owe Rs 1.30 billion to creditors. The 9X Media acquired the deal with the creditors. On 20 April 2010, Zee Enterprises confirmed that it had secured an in-principle approval from its board for acquisition of 9X, under a Scheme of Arrangement, subject to appropriate statutory and regulatory approvals. On 29 April 2010, ZEE Network's board of directors has approved the Scheme of Arrangement between ZEEL and 9X Media, former owners of 9X.

=== Shutdown ===
The channel ceased all its operations on 10 August 2009 in the UK, where the ongoing shows were shifted to its sister music channel 9XM, making it a hybrid channel. The channel ceased all its operations on 13 April 2015 in India as it stopped airing new content since 2009 and aired re-runs most of Zee TV shows. The channel even suffered losses due to lack of GRP and viewership.

== Programming ==
The following is a list of programs broadcast on 9X before it ceased all its operations.

- Dhak Dhak In Dubai (2007–2008)
- Ajeeb (2008)
- Black (2009)
- Jiya Jale (2007–2008)
- Kahaani Hamaaray Mahaabhaarat Ki (2008)
- Kahe Naa Kahe (2007–2008)
- Kya Dill Mein Hai (2007–2008)
- Veeranwali (2008–2009)
- Chak De Bachche
- Kaun Jeetega Bollywood Ka Ticket (2008)
- Mission Ustaad (2007–2008)
