= Jass Manak =

Indian singer and Songwriter (born 1999)

- Born: Jaspreet Singh Manak; 12 February 1999 (age 27); Jalandhar, Punjab, India
- Other name: Manaka Da Munda
- Education: Panjab University
- Occupations: Singer-songwriter; Music composer; Singer; Actor
- Years active: 2017–present
- Musical career
- Genres: Punjabi; Hindi pop; romantic; bhangra
- Label: Geet MP3

Jaspreet Singh Manak (born 12 February 1999) is an Indian singer-songwriter. He is known predominantly for the songs "Prada", "Suit Punjabi", "Lehanga", "Viah" and "Boss". His single "Lehanga" has featured on the UK Asian Music Chart and also the Global YouTube weekly chart.

Manak started his singing with his debut song "U-Turn" in 2017. Manak started his professional music journey in 2018, when he was 19 years old.

In 2018, he released "Without You" but rose to prominence with his song "Prada" which is one of the most-streamed hit songs in India. In 2019, he released his album Age 19. In the same year he sang "Rabb Wangu" and "Bandook" for the Punjabi movie Sikander 2. His single "Lehanga" was ranked No. 22 and No. 5 on the Global and Indian YouTube music weekly charts respectively.

Manak also become one of the most-listened-to artists in Punjab on YouTube. On 17 January 2024, Manak announced his track “Love & Lies” with Mass Appeal India.

== As songwriter ==
Manak is known for writing his own songs, which includes "Prada", "Lehanga", "Boss", "Viah" and every song from his debut album Age 19 and all the songs from singles to Ep and other albums . He has also written songs for singers Karan Randhawa and Nishawn Bhullar. In 2019, Manak wrote the song "Surma Kala" for Jassi Gill. He also wrote the song "Naam Jatt Da" for Gippy Grewal.

== Discography ==
=== EP ===
Year	EP	Music Producer(s)	Composition & Lyrics	Tracks	Language	Label
2024	Late Night Talks	Jass Manak, Avy Sra, Mnltx	Jass Manak	5	Punjabi	Mass Appeal India

=== Albums ===
Album	Year	Music Producer(s)	Co-singer(s)	Label
Age 19	2019	Sukhe, Deep Jandu, Snappy, Sharry Nexus, Game Changerz, Intense	Bohemia, Divine	Geet MP3
No Competition	2020	Jass Manak, Sharry Nexus, Rajat Nagpal, MixSingh, Aditya Dev, Vishal Mishra, Deep Jandu	Divine, Sunidhi Chauhan, Simar Kaur, Asees Kaur	Geet MP3
Bad Munda	2021	Deep Jandu, Sharry Nexus, Rajat Nagpal, Meet Bros	Simar Kaur, Emiway Bantai, Bohemia	Geet MP3
Love Thunder	2022	Sharry Nexus, V Barot, Rajat Nagpal, Ikky		Geet MP3

=== Singles ===
Year	Track	Lyricist	Music	Co-singer(s)	Label	Note(s)
2017	U TURN	Sukh Kular	AM HUMAN		Geet MP3	Debut Song
2018	Without You	Jass Manak	Game Changerz		Geet MP3	-
2018	Prada	Jass Manak	AR Deep		Geet MP3	First major hit/ Best Punjabi Song of the Year
2018	Suit Punjabi	Avvy Dhaliwal	Shagur		Geet MP3	-
2018	Boss	Jass Manak	Game Changerz		Geet MP3	-
2018	Allah	Jass Manak	Sukh-E		Geet MP3	-
2019	Girlfriend	Jass Manak	Snappy		Geet MP3	From Album "Age 19"
2019	Viah	Jass Manak	Snappy		Geet MP3	From Album "Age 19"
2019	Lehanga	Jass Manak	Sharry Nexus		Geet MP3	1Billion+ views on YouTube
2020	Tera Mera Viah	Jass Manak	MixSingh		Geet MP3	-
2020	Shopping	Jass Manak	MixSingh		Geet MP3	-
2020	Dil Todne Se Pehle	Jass Manak	Sharry Nexus		Geet MP3	-
2020	Yes Or No	Jass Manak	Sharry Nexus		Geet MP3	From Album "No Competition"
2020	Butterfly	Jass Manak	Sharry Nexus		Geet MP3	From Album "No Competition"
2020	No Competition	Jass Manak	Jass Manak	Divine	Geet MP3	From Album "No Competition"
2020	Yaara Tere Waraga	Jass Manak	Mix Singh	Sunidhi Chauhan	Geet MP3	From Album "No Competition"
2020	Karwa Chauth	Jass Manak	Sukh-E		Geet MP3	-
2021	Saiyaan	Jass Manak	Sharry Nexus		Geet MP3	Featuring Sanjeeda Sheikh
2021	Khyaal	Jass Manak	Sharry Nexus		Geet MP3	-
2021	Bad Munda	Jass Manak	Rajat Nagpal, Deep Jandu	Emiway Bantai	Geet MP3	From Album "Bad Munda"
2021	Shakka Lakka Boom Boom	Jass Manak	Rajat Nagpal, Deep Jandu	Simar Kaur	Geet MP3	From Album "Bad Munda"
2022	Naah	Jass Manak	Sharry Nexus		Geet MP3	-
2024	Love & Lies	Jass Manak	Jass Manak		Mass Appeal India	First single after partnership with "Mass Appeal India"

=== As a lyricist ===
Year	Track	Singer(s)	Music Producer(s)	Label
2018	"Wait"	Karan Randhawa	Game Changerz	Geet MP3
2019	"California"	Nishawn Bhullar, Priya	Sukhe	Geet MP3
2019	"Qatal"	Nishawn Bhullar, Gurlej Akhtar	The Kidd	Geet MP3
2019	"Tera Mera Viah"	Priya	MixSingh	Geet MP3
2019	"Jordan"	Deep Jandu, Roach Killa	Roach Killa	Geet MP3
2019	"Surma Kaala"	Jassi Gill	Snappy	T-Series
2020	"Zamana marda"	Chetan	Akash Jandu	Geet MP3
2020	"Naam Jatt Da"	Gippy Grewal ft. Jass manak	Jay K	Geet MP3
2020	"Dil Todne Se Pehle" Ji	Sunidhi Chauhan	Sharry Nexus	Geet MP3

=== Songs in films/web series ===
Year	Movie	Track	Music	Lyrics	Co-singer(s)	Label	Ref.
2018	Gangland in The Motherland	"Toronto"	Deep Jandu	Jass Manak	Priya	Geet MP3	
2018	Gangland in The Motherland	"Gangland In The Motherland"	Mix Singh	Gabbar Sangrur	Guri	Geet MP3	
2018	Gangland in The Motherland	"Dhokha"	Sharry Nexus	Sidhu Moosewala		Geet MP3	
2019	Sikander 2	"Bandook"	Game Changerz	Jass Manak		Geet MP3	
2019	Sikander 2	"Rabb Wangu"	Sharry Nexus	Jass Manak		Geet MP3	
2020	Shooter	"Gal Sun"	Rajat Nagpal	Jass Manak		Geet MP3	
2020	Shooter	"Shoot Da Order"	Deep Jandu	Roshan	Jagpal Sandhu	Geet MP3	
2021	Sardar Ka Grandson	"Jee Ni Karda"	Tanishk Bagchi, Manak-E	Manak-E, Tanishk Bagchi	Nikita Gandhi, Manak-E	T-Series	
2021	Satyameva Jayate 2	"Tenu Lehanga"	Tanishk Bagchi, Jass Manak	Tanishk Bagchi, Jass Manak	Zara Khan	T-Series	
2021	Kaka Pardhaan	"Salaama Hundiyan"	Deep Jandu	S Sadhpuri	Banny A	Geet MP3	
2022	Jatt Brothers	"Lamborghini" "London" "Chandigarh"	Rajat Nagpal	Jass Manak		Geet MP3	
2022	Lover	"Pyar Karda" "Kitna Chahe" "Marke"	Sharry Nexus, Rajat Nagpal	Jass Manak	Asees Kaur	Geet MP3	
2023	Tufang	"Teri Main Hogayi"	Sharry Nexus	Jass Manak		Geet MP3	

== Filmography ==
Year	Title	Role	Notes
2021	Satyameva Jayate 2	Himself	Special appearance
2022	Jatt Brothers	Pamma	Debut film lead role with Guri and Nikeet Dhillon

== Awards ==
Year	Award	Song	Category	Result	Ref.
2019	Mirchi Music Awards	"Prada"	Best Song of the Year	Won	
2020 2021	Mirchi Music Awards	"Lehanga"	Listener's Choice Independent Music Category (INDIES)	Nominated	
