= Faridkot =

Faridkot may refer to:

== India ==
- Faridkot, India, a city in Punjab, India
  - Faridkot district
  - Faridkot Lok Sabha constituency
- Faridkot State, a former India princely state

== Pakistan ==
- Faridkot, Khanewal, a village of Khanewal District, Punjab
- Faridkot, Okara, a village in Okara District, Punjab
- Faridkot, Pakpattan, a village in Pakpattan District, Punjab
