= Erroneous reporting on the 2008 Mumbai attacks =

Incident of reporting of incorrect factual information

During and immediately after the 2008 Mumbai attacks the news media worldwide broadcast incorrect factual information on a scale often seen in a fog of war. Erroneous reporting on the 2008 Mumbai attacks included false information concerning the number of attackers, their nationality, their organizational affiliations, origins, and the methods of transport they had used. Theories and speculations were openly aired by various commentators that were later proved to be wrong. Many such speculations, such as the involvement in the attacks of the "Deccan Mujahideen", were widely reported by media worldwide. Various news outlets carried opinion pieces and unattributed theories about the origins of the attackers which were unfounded.

== Background ==
On 26 November 2008, in the evening, local time, a series of coordinated terrorist attacks began in the city of Mumbai, India's largest city. Targets included the Chhatrapati Shivaji railway terminus and two large hotels. The attack involved both explosives and gunfire and resulted in the deaths of at least 175 people, with many more injured. Actions to clear the city of the terrorists by the authorities lasted for three days; the final gunman was killed at the Taj Mahal Hotel on 29 November. There was enormous media coverage during this attack and many of the early reports gave information that was later shown to be false. Similarly, many news outlets carried opinions and unattributed theories, both during and immediately after the attacks, which also caused confusion.

== Number of attackers ==
Only one terrorist involved in these attacks was taken alive. Ajmal Kasab was captured at the Chhatrapati Shivaji railway terminus. He reportedly claimed that he had been one of a total of 16 fidayeen, although this number was not cited in later police or news reports. He claimed that there had been another nine with him in the boat that had brought him to Mumbai. On 1 December, news reports indicated that investigators still had concerns that there may be terrorists still at large in the city. This was due to the presence of 15 toothbrushes and 15 winter jackets found aboard the hijacked vessel used to transport the hijackers to Mumbai.

On 2 December, the belief that there had been ten terrorists, all coming into Mumbai from Karachi via a hijacked trawler, was given by Mumbai Police Commissioner Hassan Gafoor. He explained that he had reason to believe that the terrorists had broken up into five groups of two men each, during the attacks.

== Responsibility claimed ==
A group claiming to be Indian made contact with news media, but the language used by them caused confusion over their actual origins. Indian authorities asserted that none of the terrorists were Indian, a claim that was later proved correct when it was revealed through evidence and the testimony of the surviving attacker Ajmal Kasab that all of the attackers were Pakistani.

=== Deccan Mujahideen ===
A previously unknown organisation identifying itself as the Deccan Mujahideen initially claimed responsibility by e-mail sent to news organisations. The name may be due to the Muslim Mughal Empire conquest of the Deccan plateau, which marked the peak of Muslim dominance in the sub-continent. On 1 December 2008, a new message was sent by the group threatening to attack one or more of three key Indian airports: New Delhi, Chennai or Bangalore.

==== E-mail to Indian media claiming responsibility ====
Claims were initially made via an e-mail sent to news agencies by a group calling itself the Deccan Mujahideen (Urdu: دکن مجاہدین; also referred to as Mujahideen Hyderabad Deccan). The Internet connection from which the e-mail was originally sent was reportedly traced to Russia, and was considered, for this reason, likely to be bogus by some intelligence experts such as B Raman, who spoke to NewsX. Further analysis, however, determined that the Russian e-mail address was registered to a computer user located in Pakistan, and routed through Lahore. India's RAW intelligence agency suggested that voice recognition software had been used to create the e-mail content. Analysis shows that the language of the manifesto corresponds to similar language used by a prior Indian Mujahideen manifesto issued after a New Delhi bombing in September 2008, thus raising the possibility that the authors may be linked. A factor weighing against this likelihood, however, is the language: the e-mail purportedly sent by the Deccan Mujahideen was written in Hindi with some Urdu words, and used a relatively mild tone, compared with previous Indian Mujahideen e-mails, which have been in English.

The New York Times has stated that international security experts "drew a blank on" the Deccan Mujahideen group, with one analyst labelling it a "front name", perhaps from a "home-grown" terrorist group, such as Indian Mujahideen (IM). The existence of a group calling itself the Deccan Mujahideen was unknown to intelligence agencies prior to the Mumbai attacks in November 2008 and the existence of the Deccan Mujahideen has not been verified. It may be an assumed name for another terrorist organization. Indian Islamic militants are known to issue hoax claims of responsibility in this fashion.

==== Cellphone call to India TV ====
Two of the terrorists involved in the attack, Shadullah and Imran Babar, called India TV twice during the siege on Thursday, 27 November, using cellphones they had taken from their hostages. Shadullah claimed that he belonged to Deccan Mujahideen. The anchor repeatedly asked whether he was from Hyderabad, India, or from Hyderabad in Pakistan, to which he responded that he belonged to Hyderabad of the Deccan. Shadullah also spoke of his motives during this conversation.

However, it has been suggested that "[the] risible attempt to claim the Mumbai killings in the name of the 'Deccan Mujahideen' merely confirms that wherever the killers are from, it is not the Deccan." The Times of India has questioned the authentic use of the term Deccan, since "Deccan" could denote any place between Pune and Hyderabad. It further cited unnamed analysts who ruled out direct connection with Hyderabad citizens or a home-grown Indian organisation since "the attacks bear the stamp of a high motivated and trained foreign agency."

==== Threat of further attack at airports ====
On 1 December, another e-mail was sent by the "Deccan Mujahideen" threatening a hijacking or an attack at one of three major Indian airports. This was to take place between 3–7 December, it was threatened. Delhi, Chennai and Bangalore airports were all put on a high state of alert as a result.

== Responsibility alleged ==
A number of terrorist and other organisations have been mentioned in news sources regarding the ongoing investigations into the November 2008 Mumbai attacks. These organisations and individuals are detailed below. This should not be misconstrued as a list of those considered likely to have had involvement in the attacks.

=== Indian Mujahideen ===
The Indian Mujahideen terrorist group threatened in September 2008 to carry out bombings in Mumbai. Foreign Policy magazine has speculated that it is possible the Deccan Mujahideen organisation, if it exists, could be related to this organisation. On 21 September 2008, Delhi police raided Batla House and arrested members of Indian Mujahideen. This reputedly caused an indirect change to the timetable of the attack. When Batla House was raided, Delhi police claimed that there was a conspiracy between Indian Mujahideen, the Students Islamic Movement of India (SIMI), and Lashkar-e-Taiba (see below).

According to some news reports, a terrorist holding hostages at the Oberoi Trident Hotel during the Mumbai attacks of November 2008 told an Indian TV channel that they wanted all 'Mujahideen' in Indian prisons set free before they released their hostages. He also indicated that there were seven terrorists holding hostages at that location. Other reports indicate that this demand was made through a hostage at the Mumbai Chabad House, in a call to the Israeli embassy in New Delhi.

==== Students Islamic Movement of India (SIMI) ====
Students Islamic Movement of India (SIMI) was suspected of providing local assistance to the attackers. A number of sympathizers of SIMI were detained on 27 November and questioned in connection with the attacks. SIMI's activities, as separable from those of Indian Mujahideen, is a subject of debate. Time magazine cited an unnamed Indian expert's assertion that, "Indian Mujahideen is simply a renamed SIMI."

=== Jaish-e-Mohammed ===
As early as 27 November, published reports contained suggestions by analysts that a connection might exist between the attacks and the Pakistan-based Jaish-e-Mohammed (JeM) organisation, even as others questioned whether "Deccan Mujahideen" could be an Indian-based "home-grown militancy".

On 3 December, the Indian Foreign Minister added the name of Masood Azhar (alias Maulana Masood Azhar), leader of Jaish-e-Mohammed, to the list of people wanted in connection with the Mumbai attacks and prior terrorist attacks in India. Azhar was described as "a suspected terrorist freed from prison in India in exchange for the release of hostages aboard a hijacked Indian Airlines aircraft in December 1999."

=== D-Company ===
D-Company is an underworld gang that operates in Mumbai. It is headed (2010) by Dawood Ibrahim. D-Company has been blamed for other past terrorist attacks, including the 1993 Mumbai bombings, which led some analysts immediately to speculate about a direct connection between D-Company and the 2008 attacks. Maloy Krishna Dhar, former joint director of India's intelligence bureau, stated, "I distinctly see the hand of Dawood Ibrahim's gang, in the knowledge of Mumbai we witnessed."

=== Al-Qaeda ===
Experts have conflicting views as to whether Al Qaeda played a role in the attacks. As events unfolded on 27 November, direct or indirect involvement by Al Qaeda could not be ruled out by Indian and British officials, although they noted that "the assault is not typical of the group, which generally favors suicide bombings." On 29 November, unnamed Indian and American intelligence sources reported increasing evidence for an indirect connection to Al Qaeda through Lashkar-e-Toiba (LeT) or Jaish-e-Mohammed (JeM). Others analysts considered that the attackers in Mumbai, even if they were not directly or even indirectly linked to the more notorious terrorist group, were at least philosophically aligned or inspired by Al Qaeda.

On 27 November, Christine Fair, of the RAND Corporation, warned explicitly about making an overly-hasty connection between these attacks and the 9/11 attacks, stating that it was, in her opinion, an act of indigenous disaffected Indians: "There's absolutely nothing Al Qaeda-like about it ... This is not India's 9/11. This is India's Oklahoma City." Such analysis, however, proved to be incorrect. Later reports indicated that all the attackers came to India from Pakistan.

Until 2 December, claims that the attackers had had links to Al Qaeda were generally unsubstantiated. However, indirect ties between Al Qaeda and the Mumbai terrorists have emerged based on the following assertions:

- One or more of the Mumbai attackers were trained by Lashkar-e-Toiba (LeT). The only surviving attacker "told police that he and the other nine gunmen had trained for months in camps in Pakistan operated by the banned Pakistani militant group Lashkar-e-Taiba, or LeT.
- Senior Al Qaeda member Abu Zubaydah was captured at a Lashkar-e-Toiba safehouse in 2002, and operational links between the two groups may have continued through to the present day.
- Harkat-ul-Jihad, a Pakistani and former Bangladeshi militant, operating on the Afghan border alongside Al Qaeda, was said to have taken over LeT training operations.
- In 1993, the United States uncovered an al Qaeda plot against targets in New York City, which was very similar in concept to that used in the Mumbai attacks.

=== Pakistani Inter-Services Intelligence ===
Rogue elements of the Pakistani Inter-Services Intelligence (ISI) agency may have provided training or material support for the terrorists. The ISI has been suspected of providing support to LeT or JeM in the past, and it has been suggested that "the equipment, training and sophistication of [the planning of the Mumbai attacks] would tend to indicate a Pakistani link." It has also been alleged that the ISI once had plans, now abandoned, to support LeT-trained insurgents in attacks on Indian-controlled Kashmir. "The possibility of rogue elements in ISI and jihadi elements in Pakistan conspiring to create tensions between New Delhi and Islamabad cannot be ruled out." The many fake identities and credit cards used by the terrorists have also led Mumbai police to suspect ISI involvement.

Sources from Pakistan have fiercely opposed this allegation. Pakistan's Ambassador to the US stated: "No element of Pakistan's State or Government was involved in these attacks. These attacks are the actions of non-state actors."

=== Former or active Pakistani Army members ===
In December, reports alleged that the terrorists had been trained by former members of the Pakistani army: "Mumbai police commissioner Hasan Ghafoor said ex-Pakistani army officers trained the group – some for up to 18 months". These news reports asserted that two active-duty Pakistani army corps commanders may have provided equipment and training for up to "70-odd terrorists tasked with the Mumbai operations." Analysts were said to be divided over whether Pakistani army chief Ashfaq Kiyani knew of these operations. Increasing strains between the civil and military leadership of the Pakistani government was widely noted in the days following the Mumbai attack.

=== Indian fugitives in Pakistan and Saudi Arabia ===
On 3 December, Indian Foreign Minister Pranab Mukherjee released a statement that the Indian government was asking the Pakistani authorities for the arrest and extradition to India of about 20 Indian fugitives believed to be currently residing in Pakistan, in connection with the November 2008 and previous terrorist attacks. These fugitives included Dawood Ibrahim and Masood Azhar. Pakistani President Asif Ali Zardari responded to this request by stating that these suspects, if they were in Pakistan, would be tried in Pakistani courts if there was evidence of any wrongdoing by them. "At the moment, these are just names of individuals – no proof and no investigation", he told CNN. "If we had the proof, we would try them in our courts and we would try them in our land and we would sentence them."

Reports have emerged of a possible connection between Indian residents and non-resident Indians (NRI) living in Saudi Arabia. Such Indian nationals who hold radical Muslim beliefs, living overseas, may be behind the financing and organisation of the operations of the Indian Mujahideen. These individuals have allegedly recruited and trained followers at LeT camps in Pakistan and been behind the terrorist bombings of Indian cities by Indian Mujahideen.

Indians possibly or allegedly involved in international terrorist networks include: Abdul Bari, a Hyderabad resident and possible financier of Indian Mujahideen (IM) operations; CAM Basheer, a leader of SIMI in the late 1980s, an aeronautical engineer and allegedly trained in LeT camps; Dawood Ibrahim, who has possibly aided smuggling or provided other logistical support and is wanted in connection with the Mumbai bombings of 1993; Amir Raza Khan, who has allegedly helped to create Indian Mujahideen and is believed to be responsible for the 13 September 2008 Delhi bombings; and Riyaz Bhatkal, possibly also known as "Shahrukh", and allegedly instrumental in the creation of Indian Mujahideen. He is thought to have fled to Pakistan after involvement in other terrorist attacks, including the 1993 Mumbai bombings and the 13 September 2008 Delhi bombings.

== Involvement of Pakistan ==
Various theories were put forward as to why the attack occurred. Some of these directly implicated the government of Pakistan in the attack, its military and the Pakistani ISI intelligence agency, in collaboration with the Lashkar-e-Taiba (LeT) organisation. Others fully exonerated these entities, believing that the attacks were conducted by people operating independently. As of December 2010, opinion holds that the LeT most probably was behind the attacks.

=== Independent 'non-state actors' theory ===
As late as 3 December 2008, Pakistan President Asif Ali Zardari and other Pakistani officials declared that they had seen no evidence that the Mumbai attackers were from Pakistan, and that they did not believe the attackers were from Pakistan. Later, they maintained that the attackers were "non-state actors" unconnected with the Pakistani military or ISI.

=== ISI/LeT Operation: agents provocateurs or rogues? ===
There is no doubt the terrorist attacks in Mumbai were perpetrated by individuals who came from Pakistan and whose controllers are in Pakistan.

— Indian Foreign Minister Pranab Mukherjee

Given the sophistication and military precision of the attack, it must have had the support of some official agencies in Pakistan.

— Indian Prime Minister Manmohan Singh

Many reports confirmed that the terrorists had been trained, supported and directly sent by Lashkar-e-Taiba (LeT), an organisation which was originally established by the Pakistani Inter-Services Intelligence (ISI) directorate. LeT and ISI sources continued categorically to deny any involvement, although there was evidence to the contrary.

On 2 December, investigations reported by the press alleged that Zakiur Rahman (also known as Zaki-ur-Rehman Lakhvi), the leader of Lashkar-e-Taiba, had trained the Mumbai terrorists "under the aegis of a junior ISI major" as part of a plan originally conceived by General Ashfaq Kiani, then head of the ISI. Gen. Kiani shortly thereafter became chief of the Pakistan Army. Such allegations raised the question of how much control the Pakistani government had over its military and ISI activities, and how much control the military and ISI had over the paramilitary groups they trained and equipped.

The reported goal of the original plan was to train insurgents to target the Indian-controlled territory of Kashmir. Two months prior to the attacks in Mumbai, this plan was officially scrapped by the Pakistani military. Three different theories were put forward to account for the change of direction of the operation following this decision.

==== Rogue independent LeT operation theory ====
This theory held that after a planned ISI/LeT operation against Kashmir was cancelled, the LeT operation went rogue and the organizers of the operation then independently allied themselves with Al Qaeda. The operation was allegedly taken over by the Pakistani militant Harkat-ul-Jihad, working with Al Qaeda along the Afghan border. It was after this that the plans were radically redrawn to become an attack on Mumbai. Under this scenario, the cancellation of plans by the Pakistani government forced a radical transformation of the operation from one aimed at Kashmir to one aimed at Mumbai instead. Therefore, the Pakistani military and ISI were not responsible for the attacks.

==== Rogue element ISI/LeT operation theory ====
In this theory, continued military and ISI connections to the operations were through agents who were operating without the authorisation of the Pakistani central military and intelligence command and were thus also rogue elements. The motive here was to provoke a confrontation with India, which would be seen as an act of Islamic Pakistani strength, in contrast to the politically weak actions of Pakistani president Asif Ali Zardari.

==== Clandestine ISI/LeT operation theory ====
A third scenario held that it was an ISI/LeT operation directed to use LeT agents provocateurs against Mumbai, independently and clandestinely funded and supported by the Pakistani military or the ISI without the knowledge or approval of the civilian Pakistani government. This postulated the existence of a long-term plan to attack Mumbai, and was based upon the evidence of an operative, Faheen Ahmed Ansari, who was arrested in February 2008. Under this scenario, the attack was planned at least as early as Ansari's reconnaissance mission to Mumbai in late 2007. Under this theory, ISI continued to be involved in the planning and operations, even after formal cancellation of the plan involving terrorist attacks against Indian-controlled Kashmir, although the operation may have been assigned to a lower-level ISI official.

== Other theories ==
Many other theories and arguments arose over who was responsible for the attacks. The following are among the most-cited theories based on news sources and media information.

=== Indian perpetrators ===
Faheem Ahmed Ansari, an Indian who was arrested in February 2008 in connection with the 2007 New Year's Eve terrorist attack in India, admitted to acting as a reconnaissance for a planned attack against targets in Mumbai.

=== Combination of Indian and foreign perpetrators ===
Various analyses and reports posited a combination of local and international origins for the attacks. Either foreign attackers had local aid and assistance, or Indian nationals directly participated alongside foreigners.

According to reports on 30 November 2008, the captured terrorist Azam Amir Kasab gave the names and addresses of five Mumbai residents who provided assistance to the operation. Joint Commissioner of Police (Crime) Rakesh Maria cautioned that it would be premature to comment on suspects and specifics at that time. On 2 December, Police Commissioner Hasan Gafoor said "there was no evidence of local support involved in the recent terror attacks in the city."

== Speculation by port of origin ==
Confusion arose at first regarding the means by which the attackers had arrived in India. Two separate ships were mentioned: the MV Alpha and the fishing trawler Kuber. The Indian Navy intercepted a boat, the MV Alpha, allegedly used by the terrorists. One report said that it had been commandeered while anchored at Porbandar on the Gujarat coast. Another spurious report said the MV Alpha had arrived from Karachi. Reports of the involvement of the Alpha were incorrect; it turned out to be a Vietnamese ship, en route to Alang for scrapping, with no connection to the attacks. The captain of the fishing trawler Kuber was found beheaded aboard his ship and the rest of the crew missing and it was confirmed that this was the vessel that had been used.

== Female accomplice during attacks? ==
Cama hospital workers and shopkeepers claimed that an unarmed burqa-clad woman, who wore a salwar kameez underneath, shopped for food supplies and knocked on doors with Azam Amir as he fired his weapon at the Cama hospital employee quarters at the beginning of the attacks on the evening of 26 November 2008. On 2 December, Mumbai Police Commissioner Hasan Gafoor was reported to say that "he was not sure about the involvement of any female terrorist", and the status of this unidentified woman remains unknown.

== See also ==
- Terrorism in India
- Timeline of the 2008 Mumbai attacks
