= Shantaram (TV series) =

2022 American television series

- Genre: Drama; Thriller
- Created by: Eric Warren Singer; Steve Lightfoot
- Based on: Shantaram by Gregory David Roberts
- Directed by: Bharat Nalluri; Iain B. MacDonald; Bronwen Hughes
- Starring: Charlie Hunnam; Fayssal Bazzi; Sujaya Dasgupta; Antonia Desplat; Elham Ehsas; David Field; Matthew Joseph; Rachel Kamath; Alyy Khan; Elektra Kilbey; Shiv Palekar; Luke Pasqualino; Vincent Perez; Shubham Saraf; Gabrielle Scharnitzky; Alexander Siddig
- Composer: Adam Peters
- Countries of origin: United States; Australia
- Original language: English
- No. of episodes: 12

Production
- Executive producers: Steve Lightfoot; Andrea Barron; Bharat Nalluri; Nicole Clemens; Steve Golin; Eric Warren Singer; Justin Kurzel; David Manson; Richard Sharkey
- Producers: Charlie Hunnam; Ben Dubash; Marisha Mukerjee; Marion Dayre
- Cinematography: Stefan Duscio
- Editor: Geraud Brisson
- Running time: 44–60 minutes
- Production companies: Fair Honest Positive Creative; The 4 Keys; Bohemian Risk Productions; Square Head Productions; Anonymous Content; Paramount Television Studios

Original release
- Network: Apple TV+
- Release: 14 October – 16 December 2022

Shantaram is an American-Australian drama thriller television series created by Eric Warren Singer and Steve Lightfoot, based on the novel of the same name by Gregory David Roberts. The story drew inspiration from Roberts' own life, which is about a bank robber from Australia who flees the country to India.

The series consists of twelve episodes directed by Bharat Nalluri, Iain B. MacDonald and Bronwen Hughes. Steve Lightfoot joined as showrunner after Eric Warren Singer departed the project. It is produced by Fair Honest Positive Creative, The 4 Keys, Bohemian Risk Productions, Square Head Productions, Anonymous Content and Paramount Television Studios and was distributed by Apple Inc. for their streaming service, Apple TV+. The series premiered on 14 October 2022 and concluded on 16 December 2022. In December 2022, the series was cancelled after one season.

== Cast ==
=== Main ===
- Charlie Hunnam as Dale Conti/Lindsay "Linbaba" Ford, an Australian former paramedic-in-training who was arrested and subsequently imprisoned for a series of armed robberies until he eventually escaped from Pentridge Prison. He successfully flees to Bombay, India, changes his identity, and lives life as a wanted man. He also serves as the narrator of the series. The character of Lindsay is based on the life of Gregory David Roberts, the author of Shantaram.
- Fayssal Bazzi as Abdullah Taheri, an Iranian underboss who works for the crime lord Khader Khan.
- Sujaya Dasgupta as Kavita, a young journalist looking for a new story.
- Antonia Desplat as Karla Saaranen, a mysterious Swiss woman and Lin's love interest who is involved with the criminal underworld of Bombay.
- Elham Ehsas as Sebastian Modena, Lisa's Spanish pimp and love interest.
- David Field as Wally Nightingale, a police detective in the Victoria Police who investigated Lin's crimes and hopes to track him down following his prison escape.
- Matthew Joseph as Ravi, a young boy living in the Sagar Wada slum who is orphaned following the death of his mother, Lakshmi.
- Rachel Kamath as Parvati, a young woman who runs a tea stall in the Sagar Wada slum who Prabhu is romantically interested in.
- Alyy Khan as Qasim Ali, the respected headman of the Sagar Wada slum.
- Elektra Kilbey as Lisa Carter, Karla's American friend who is a prostitute suffering from substance abuse.
- Shiv Palekar as Vikram, a Bollywood stuntman who is obsessed with Spaghetti Westerns.
- Luke Pasqualino as Maurizio Belcane, Modena's Italian friend and a drug trafficker who dislikes Lin.
- Vincent Perez as Didier Levy, Karla's French friend who acts as a middleman for various criminals.
- Shubham Saraf as Prabaker "Prabhu" Kharre, a friendly tour guide who lives in the Sagar Wada slum and is the first person Lin meets after arriving in Bombay.
- Gabrielle Scharnitzky as Madame Zhou, the owner of "the Palace", a brothel that services wealthy clients.
- Alexander Siddig as Abdel Khader Khan, one of the biggest crime lords in Bombay who is fighting for control of the city's criminal underworld.

=== Recurring ===
- Rahel Romahn as Rafiq, a hardened criminal who ran books for the crime lord Walid Shah.
- Mel Odedra as Walid Shah, a crime lord in Bombay and the rival of Khader Khan.
- Arka Das as Nishant Patel
- Sushant Davane as Ramesh
- Suraj Kolarkar as Johnny Cigar
- Nicholas Bell as Professor Carr

== Episodes ==
No.	Title	Directed by	Written by	Original release date
1	"The Bombay No"	Bharat Nalluri	Eric Warren Singer and Steve Lightfoot	14 October 2022
Dale Conti, a former ambulance driver, heroin addict, and bank robber, escapes from Pentridge Prison in Australia. Travelling to Bombay under the assumed name Lindsay Ford, he encounters the eager Prabhu, who helps him get situated and christens him with the nickname "Lin." During a chance encounter with the beautiful Karla, Lin is invited to the bar Reynaldo's Cafe, frequented by several expatriates with ties to the city's underworld, including Karla, fixer Didier, a call girl named Lisa, and her pimps Maurizo and Modena, as well as Bombay locals Kavita, a journalist, and Vikram, a Bollywood stunt actor. After Maurizio coerces Lisa into the employ of Madame Zhou, a brothel madam exploiting Lisa's heroin habit, Karla entreats Lin to assume the identity of an American diplomat to vouchsafe Lisa's release. Lin, who is beginning to develop feelings for Karla, reluctantly agrees, and her plan succeeds. Returning home from Karla's apartment, Lin is beaten and robbed of all his possessions, including his passport and his money, by Zhou's men.
2	"Down and Out in Bombay"	Bharat Nalluri	Eric Warren Singer and Steve Lightfoot	14 October 2022
A dazed Lin is found in the street by a policeman, who escorts him to his hotel. Now penniless, he relocates to Prabhu's home in the Sagar Wada slums. Lin seeks help from Karla, who is indifferent to his plight, and Didier, who refuses to pull any strings on his behalf. Lisa, who is experiencing withdrawals, recalls to Karla a tryst with a corrupt politician named Rujul Aadekar, who had promised crime lord Walid Shah the land of the Sagar Wada slums for a development deal. Karla reports this to rival kingpin Abdel Khader Khan, who was originally promised the land, and Khader Khan personally executes Aadekar for his duplicity. Karla delivers payment to Lin for his role in Lisa's rescue. Disillusioned with Karla and Bombay, Lin prepares to leave, but he is attacked by a would-be assassin. The assassin is deterred when Lin kicks burning coals onto him, causing the assassin's clothes and a nearby shack to catch alight, starting a fire that quickly spreads.
3	"Strange Bedfellows"	Bharat Nalluri	David Manson and Eric Warren Singer and Steve Lightfoot	14 October 2022
Flashbacks reveal how Lin came to be arrested; after robbing a bank, his partner shoots an officer attempting to detain him, and Lin stays behind to perform emergency first aid. After helping to fight the fire at Sagar Wada, Lin performs triage on the slum's injured residents. Prabhu's neighbour, Lakshmi, is fatally wounded, leaving behind a son, Ravi. The following day, throngs of people entreat Lin for medical aid, and he hesitantly agrees to help. Feeling guilty about his role in starting the fire, Lin gives Karla's money to the Sagar Wada's headman, Qasim Ali, to aid in rebuilding. Khader Khan arranges a sit-down with Walid Shah, who makes it clear that Khader's reluctance to traffick in drugs and sex has made him appear weak. Khader threatens Madame Zhou for hosting the meeting between Shah and Aadekar, and Zhou in turn intimidates Maurizio into selling heroin in Khader's territory. Having heard tell of his heroism in the slums, Khader summons Lin to a meeting and takes him on a nightlong tour of Bombay alongside his underboss Abdullah. Upon his return to Sagar Wada, Ravi threatens Lin with a knife. Lin prepares to surrender himself to the boy's judgment, but Qasim intervenes and vows to adopt Ravi.
4	"Bad Medicine"	Iain B. MacDonald	Ben Dubash	21 October 2022
In the past, Lin pleads guilty at his trial despite a lack of evidence connecting him to the bank robbery. In the present, Lin attempts to raise funds to buy medicine for Sagar Wada. Lin and Prabhu start a tourism business, but unable to find medical supplies, Lin turns to Khader Khan for a connection to the black market in medical goods. Khader instructs Abdullah to help Lin procure the supplies, but their meeting with the supplier is fruitless. On their way home, Abdullah is attacked by Walid Shah's men and nearly stabbed by rival underboss Rafiq, but Lin helps Abdullah fight off his assailants. Out of gratitude to Lin, Khader pays for the medicine. Karla meets with Aakash Pandey, the minister who replaced Aadekar, on Khader's behalf. Pandey, however, has already been bribed by Shah, who threatens a gang war if Khader continues to pursue the Sagar Wada development. Lisa leaves Karla's care and is looked after by Modena, who helps her to clean her apartment of heroin paraphernalia. Maurizio sells one kilogram of Zhou's heroin to Raheem, a drug dealer from Lagos.
5	"The Sin in the Crime"	Iain B. MacDonald	Ken Kristensen	28 October 2022
In Sagar Wada, Abdullah publicly gifts Lin with a Royal Enfield motorcycle for saving his life, causing a stir among the residents of the slum. Karla accuses Khader Khan of using Lin as a pawn in his struggle against Shah; Khader maintains that Lin is "a distraction." Kavita stops by Lin's home in the slums, endeavouring to write a story about his feats there. When she takes his photograph without permission, he grabs her camera and tears out the film. Looking into his records, she discovers that Lin used a dead man's passport to enter the country. Qasim undertakes a collection to pay Lin back for the medicine, averring that the slum cannot afford to be indebted to Khader. Khader meets privately with the burned man who assailed Lin in the slums, sending him away just before Lin drops by with Qasim's money. At Prabhu's urging, Lin pays a late night visit to Karla, where he tells her the truth of his past life and his escape from Australia, and she tells him of her father's suicide. The two share a kiss, but Karla stops the night from progressing further.
6	"Dead Man Walking"	Iain B. MacDonald	Marion Dayre	4 November 2022
Lin tries to convince Kavita to drop the story; she agrees in person, but has him covertly photographed by her editor, Nishant. Maurizio's newfound wealth raises questions for Karla and Lisa. Karla tells Abdullah, her ex-lover, that Maurizio is selling heroin in Khader Khan's territory. Lisa convinces Modena to disclose that Zhou is supplying the drugs. Didier is arrested escaping from a tryst with a married man and tortured by the police. Lin - who is keen to use Didier's passport-forging connections in the face of Kavita's investigations - bails him out of prison with the help of Vikram, and spends the night helping Didier recuperate. While Lin is busy with Didier, Parvati, his clinical assistant, falls seriously ill while on a date with Prabhu, who searches in vain for Lin.
7	"Apo Vai Pranah"	Bronwen Hughes	Bornila Chatterjee	11 November 2022
Sagar Wada is hit by an outbreak of cholera, which afflicts Parvati and many others. Lacking adequate clean drinking water and medicine, Lin once again turns to Khader Khan for help. Khader agrees, on the condition that his help not be anonymous; he and Abdullah personally deliver the water to the grateful slum residents, in spite of Qasim's protestations. Although the cholera claims several lives, Parvati makes a full recovery, and Prabhu, while wary of Lin's dealings with Khader, is grateful for the help. The burned assassin tails Aakash Pandey and discovers that he is having an affair with a low-caste brothel worker, Sunita. Khader pressures Zhou to purchase Sunita from the brothel's owner, and Zhou imprisons her on his behalf. In order to cement Maurizio's heroin sale, Lisa spends a night with Raheem, much to Modena's frustration. Abdullah warns Maurizio to stop dealing drugs.
8	"Like in the Time of Cholera"	Bronwen Hughes	Eric Binswanger	18 November 2022
Lin falls ill with cholera and deliriously recalls how his Australian lover Gemma, a wealthy activist who got him into heroin, left him after his arrest. Karla helps Lin recuperate, but leaves to visit Sunita in Zhou's brothel. Sunita refuses to help her entrap Pandey, as she has fallen in love with him. Modena collects the money from Raheem, who belittles Modena in front of his associates. After Maurizio tells Modena about Abdullah's threat, the two decide to double-cross Zhou and Raheem, flip the heroin instead of bringing it to Raheem, and leave Bombay with everything. When Maurizio insults Lisa, however, Modena absconds with nearly all of their money. Rafiq and Walid Shah's men destroy Sagar Wada's fresh water supply and warn against further dealings with Khader Khan. Lin brokers a sit-down between Khader and Qasim. Khader comes clean about his intention to develop property on the land, but promises that in the meantime he will invest in the health, education, and employment of Sagar Wada's residents. When Rafiq and his men arrive to destroy the next day's shipment of water, the residents of Sagar Wada fight them off.
9	"Should I Stay or Should I Go"	Bronwen Hughes	Bruce Marshall Romans	23 November 2022
A desperate Sunita calls Pandey for help and entreats him to use Walid's bribe money to pay her way out of the brothel; Karla and Abdullah covertly record the conversation, and blackmail him into supporting Khader Khan's bid over Walid's. In return, Karla asks that Khader buy Sunita's freedom, and he assents. Raheem and his men find Maurizio, who places the blame for the undelivered heroin on Lin. Lin makes preparations to leave Bombay, taking Karla out for a goodbye dinner and confessing his love for her. Karla does not reciprocate, but she convinces Kavita to drop her story on him with the promise of a better one.
10	"Dig Two Graves"	Iain B. MacDonald	Teleplay by : Aaron Sprecher; Adaptation by : Marisha Mukerjee	2 December 2022
Lisa and Karla tell Kavita most of the story of Walid Shah's dealings with Pandey, omitting Khader Khan's involvement. After discovering a photo of Lin faxed by Nishant, Wally Nightingale - the Australian detective assigned to Lin's case - arrives in Bombay. However, he is stonewalled by Nishant and Kavita, who have promised Karla that they will keep Lin's secret. With Prabhu's help, Lin and Abdullah track down Raheem and violently insist upon Lin's innocence. Upon learning that they are associates of Khader, Raheem gives up Maurizio. Lin arrives at the hotel where Maurizio is being held to find that he has escaped. With Lisa's help, he lures Maurizio to Modena's apartment; Maurizio realises that it was Karla who gave him up to Khader, and Lin knocks him out. Realizing that she has manipulated him since he came to India, Lin declares that he never wants to see Karla again.
11	"Banquet of Consequences"	Iain B. MacDonald	Teleplay by : Bruce Marshall Romans; Adaptation by : Marisha Mukerjee and Shaun Gray	9 December 2022
Parvati chides Prabhu for involving himself with Lin and Abdullah's business together. Khader Khan chastises Karla for bringing Sunita's story to Kavita, and she admits that she did it so that Lin could stay. Meanwhile, Zhou visits Walid Shah and warns him that Khader and Karla are planning to implicate them in the story on Pandey. Shah orders attacks on Khader and his network. While Abdullah is able to protect Khader, Pandey is killed by Shah's men, who also attack Qasim Ali in Sagar Wada. Rather than escape the slum, Lin stays behind to treat Qasim's injuries. After failing to learn Lin's whereabouts from Didier and Prabhu, Nightingale is led to Lin's location by Ravi, and Lin narrowly escapes with Prabhu's help. Maurizio and Zhou's men track Modena and Lisa to Karla's apartment. He shoots Modena in the gut and brings Lisa and Karla to Zhou. Khader orders Abdullah to find Karla.
12	"All the Way From There Just to Get to Here"	Iain B. MacDonald	Steve Lightfoot & Ken Kristensen	16 December 2022
Abdullah and Lin consecutively arrive to Karla's apartment and bring a bleeding Modena to a clinic. Kavita's story goes to print the next morning, but Nishant puts own his name on the byline to protect her and he is killed by a hitman as reprisal from Walid Shah. Lin arrives at Zhou's brothel just as Karla and Lisa escape from their confinement and a mob, inflamed by Kavita's story, prepares to storm the building. Lisa shoots Maurizio and several of Zhou's men, and Lin convinces Karla to spare her conscience and let Zhou face mob justice. With the help of a policeman on his payroll, Khader Khan sets a trap for Shah, and Abdullah executes him. Returning home, Lin and Karla finally act on their feelings for one another, and make preparations to leave Bombay together. Lisa stops by the clinic to visit Modena only to find him gone. Feeling used by Karla and guilty over her role in Nishant's death, Kavita tells Nightingale he can likely find Lin at Karla's apartment. Lin evades Nightingale by jumping from her rooftop, but is abducted on his way to meet Karla at the train station. Karla leaves Bombay alone as Lin is beaten in custody.

== Production ==
=== Origin ===
When the novel Shantaram was published in 2003, several parties expressed interest in a film adaptation. As Warner Bros. purchased the film's rights for $2 million, Brad Grey, an executive of the company, decided to hire Johnny Depp due to his expression of love for the book, which was to be based on a script written by the book's author Gregory David Roberts. In October 2005, Warner Bros. hired screenwriter Eric Roth to rewrite the initial draft created by Roberts. The following November, the studio hired Peter Weir to direct and to develop the script with Roth.

Originally planned to schedule production for late 2006, in June of that year, Weir departed from the project with a studio spokesperson citing different interpretations between the director, the studio, and producers, and was replaced by Mira Nair in January 2007. The studio initially wanted to start production in early 2007, which was later cancelled by Warner Bros, citing the 2007–2008 Writers Guild of America strike's interference with the script's readiness, the schedule, and climatic conflicts with the difficulties in filming between India and New Mexico in the United States.

Although in November 2008, The Independent reported the project had been cancelled, a report in May 2013, from the Mumbai Mirror stated that Warner Bros. had negotiated to retain the film rights until 2015, speculating that a film adaptation of Shantaram was still in the works. The following October, Depp approached Joel Edgerton to star in his place also being involved in the project as a producer. Warner Bros. was in early talks with Garth Davis, co-director of the Emmy-nominated Top of the Lake, to make his feature film directing debut on the movie which also failed to happen.

=== Development ===
In January 2018, Anonymous Content and Paramount Television Studios acquired the rights to Shantaram, with plans to repurpose it as a television series. In June 2018, it was announced that Apple Inc. was developing a television adaptation of the novel for Apple TV+, becoming one of their first international production with two other series announced during its launch. Eric Warren Singer was appointed as the screenwriter, who was to also serve as the executive producer alongside David Manson, Nicole Clemens, Steve Golin, and Andrea Barron with Charlie Hunnam in the lead role. Singer took more than year to complete the writing of the series. Pre-production work was completed by August 2019. In September 2019, Charlie Hunnam, Richard Roxburgh and Radhika Apte were cast as series leads, with Justin Kurzel set to direct the first two and last two episodes of the ten-part series.

Shantaram was set to begin in Victoria, Australia, and Bhopal, India, as the primary locations. The Australian Government planned to provide $5 million for the production of the project through its Location Incentive program, with the Victorian Government also supporting the series through Film Victoria's Production Incentive Attraction Fund. The budget was estimated at $100 million.

In February 2020, Singer stepped down as showrunner of the series, stating that the delay in shooting had created potential scheduling conflicts. In November 2020, Apple hired Steve Lightfoot as the new showrunner for the series, who completed writing the remaining episodes; Alexander Siddig joined the cast in March 2021. Siddig was approached to play the role of Kader Khan, a role rumoured to have been meant for Amitabh Bachchan, who Mira Nair had proposed. Bharat Nalluri was announced as director of the remaining six episodes.

=== Filming ===
Filming of the series began in October 2019 in Australia, followed by a move to India in November 2019, with a significant portion of the series expected to be shot over the course of a year in Bhopal and various other locations in Madhya Pradesh. Shooting of the series was suspended in February 2020 due to Singer's departure from the series leading to a writing backlog, as well as the COVID-19 pandemic restrictions beginning in March 2020, and the Indian monsoon season which happens in the June–October period. Production restarted in Melbourne, in May 2021 before additional filming was moved to Thailand due to India's worsening COVID-19 outbreaks. Production returned to Melbourne in August 2021. All principal photography was completed in mid-December 2021.

== Reception ==
The review aggregator website Rotten Tomatoes reported a 56% approval rating with an average rating of 5.9/10, based on 27 critic reviews. The website's critics consensus reads, "Charlie Hunnam is appealingly roguish as the irascible Lin Ford, but Shantaram's lack of a propelling narrative leaves this compelling character stranded." Metacritic, which uses a weighted average, assigned a score of 62 out of 100 based on 14 critics, indicating "generally favorable reviews".
