= State of Siege: 26/11 =

Indian web series

- Poster
- Created by: Abhimanyu Singh
- Based on: Black Tornado: The Three Sieges of Mumbai 26/11 by Sandip Unnithan
- Written by: Joshua Caldwell; Sandeep Unnithan
- Directed by: Matthew Leutwyler; Prashant Singh
- Starring: Arjan Bajwa; Arjun Bijlani; Jyoti Gauba; Vivek Dahiya; Tara Alisha Berry; Mukul Dev; Naren Kumar
- Country of origin: India
- Original language: Hindi
- No. of seasons: 1
- No. of episodes: 8

Production
- Producer: Abhimanyu Singh Roopali Singh
- Cinematography: Richard Henkels
- Running time: 30 mins

Original release
- Network: ZEE5
- Release: 20 March 2020

State of Siege: 26/11 is an Indian Hindi-language action thriller web series on ZEE5, directed by Matthew Leutwyler and Prashant Singh and produced by Abhimanyu Singh and Roopali Singh. The series is based on journalist Sandip Unnithan's book Black Tornado: The Three Sieges of Mumbai 26/11 about the military's Operation Black Tornado during the 26/11 terrorist attacks. The series features Arjan Bajwa, Arjun Bijlani, Jyoti Gauba, Vivek Dahiya, Tara Alisha Berry Mukul Dev and Naren Kumar in prominent roles. The series was launched on 20 March 2020 on ZEE5.

== Plot ==
The series depicts the terrorist attacks from the lens of NSG Commandos who were called in to save the day during the 26/11 terrorist attacks after the Mumbai Police suffered major casualties.

== Cast ==
- Arjan Bajwa as Col. Kunal Sahota
- Digvijay Purohit as Lt. Col. Aniruddh Das
- Arjun Bijlani as Maj. Nikhil Manikrishnan
- Vivek Dahiya as Capt. Rohit Bagga
- Mukul Dev as Zakiur Rehman Lakhvi
- Avinash Wadhawan as J.C.P. Sidana
- Naren Kumar as Babar Imran
- Ashwin Patil as Nazeer
- Karan Singh Chahhbra as Nasir
- Abhishek Goyal as Javed
- Akash Makhija as Shoaib
- Abhishek Mahendru as Hafiz
- Shoaib Kabeer as Ajmal Kasab
- Sonu Randeep Chaudhary as Ismail
- Sid Makkar as Sontosh Dutta
- Tara Alisha Berry as Parvati Patil
- Suzanne Bernert as Yocheved Orpaz
- Imran Nazir Khan as Brogon
- Vipul Deshpande as DCP SooryaVardhan

== Episodes ==
No.	Title	Directed by	Written by	Original release date
1	"The Calm Before The Storm"	Matthew Leutwyler, Prashant Singh	Joshua Caldwell, Sandeep Unnithan	20 March 2020
Col. Sahota struggles to get the much-needed upgrades for the NSG. In Mumbai, life goes on as usual as the terrorists make their way towards the city of dreams.
2	"This Is War"	Matthew Leutwyler, Prashant Singh	Joshua Caldwell, Sandeep Unnithan	20 March 2020
The terrorists attack CST, Leopold Café, Taj Hotel, Oberoi Hotel, and Chabad House simultaneously. Parvati uses this opportunity to impress her seniors.
3	"The Countdown Begins"	Matthew Leutwyler, Prashant Singh	Joshua Caldwell, Sandeep Unnithan	20 March 2020
Kasab and Ismail attack the Cama Hospital. The Mumbai Police continues to fight the terrorists as the NSG team leaves for Mumbai.
4	"State Of Siege"	Matthew Leutwyler, Prashant Singh	Joshua Caldwell, Sandeep Unnithan	20 March 2020
Kasab is captured after he and Ismail kill the ATS Chief. The Pakistani handlers continue using Parvati's broadcasts to provide updates to the terrorists.
5	"Counter Strike"	Matthew Leutwyler, Prashant Singh	Joshua Caldwell, Sandeep Unnithan	20 March 2020
The NSG team takes charge of the situation as they start evacuating the Taj Hotel. The second NSG team reaches Chabad house to rescue the Israeli hostages.
6	"Commando Down"	Matthew Leutwyler, Prashant Singh	Joshua Caldwell, Sandeep Unnithan	20 March 2020
Col. Sahota sends his men to look for Mani after he goes missing. The commandos try to enter the Chabad House through the roof via a helicopter. Their operation is initiated.
7	"Black Tornado - The Final Battle"	Matthew Leutwyler, Prashant Singh	Joshua Caldwell, Sandeep Unnithan	20 March 2020
The NSG team takes control of the Chabad House. At the Taj Hotel, Col. Sahota and his team enter the kitchen for a final face-off with the terrorists.
8	"Bonus Feature - The Making Of a Terrorist"	Matthew Leutwyler, Prashant Singh	Joshua Caldwell, Sandeep Unnithan	20 March 2020\
During the interrogation, Kasab reveals important details about his recruitment in Lashkar-e-Toiba, and how terror camps are run in an organised fashion.

== Release ==
The trailer of the series was released on 26 February 2020 and later-on the web series was premiered on 20 March 2020 on ZEE5.

== Reception ==
Jyoti Kanyal from India Today briefly stated "State of Siege 26/11 will remind you of all the documentaries, films and shows based on the Mumbai terror attacks, but what is unique about this show is that it narrates the story from the perspective of the NSG."

Arushi Jain from The Indian Express summarizes her take stating "State of Siege 26/11 gives you a stirring visual account of the 2008 Mumbai attacks and compels you to keep watching." Udita Jhunjhunwala from Scroll.in wrote "State of Siege is less about the victims and their trauma and more about the men with the guns and power." The rediff.com's Joginder Tuteja wrote, "it leaves you shocked and wide-eyed and also succeeds in uncovering the various sides of the story during the siege". PINKVILLA's Bhavna Aggarwal wrote, "State of Siege: 26/11 is an unapologetic & REAL portrayal of Mumbai attack."

== Spin-off ==
State of Siege: Temple Attack (2021) is the next installment to State of Siege: 26/11. It stars Akshaye Khanna and is directed by Ken Ghosh. It is based on the 2002 Akshardham Temple attack in Gujarat.
