= Mahendru =

Mahendru is an Indian surname. Notable people with the surname include:

- Abhishek Mahendru, Indian actor
- Anju Mahendru (born 1946), Indian actress
- Annet Mahendru (born 1985), American actress
- Sanjay Mahindru, Indian admiral
