= Mumbai Central Jail =

Building in India

Mumbai Central Jail Arthur Road Jail
- Interactive map of Mumbai Central Jail; Arthur Road Jail
- Location: Mumbai, Maharashtra, India; 18°59′6.7″N 72°49′47.14″E
- Status: Open
- Security class: Maximum
- Capacity: 1074
- Opened: 1926; 100 years ago

The Mumbai Central Jail, also referred to as Arthur Road Jail, was built in 1926, and is Mumbai's largest and oldest prison. It houses most of the city's prisoners. It was declared a Central Jail in 1972. Although its name was changed to Mumbai Central Prison, it is still often referred to as Arthur Road Jail. The jail occupies 2 acres (0.81 ha) of land.

== Location ==
The jail is located near Jacob Circle/Sat Rasta, between the Mahalaxmi railway station and Chinchpokli railway station and the Jacob Circle monorail station in the southern part of the city. It is now surrounded by residential property renting for Rs 12–25,000/sq foot, while commercial property is leased for Rs 30–60,000/sq foot.

== Conditions ==
The jail was originally built to accommodate 800 prisoners but the average number of inmates is 2900—far exceeding its capacity in terms of space, sanitation and other facilities. It is often reported that the jail is overcrowded, and there have been proposals to build another such facility in the eastern suburbs of Mankhurd to ease the load on the jail.

The State Human Rights Commission had often suggested that the prison be decongested. Furthermore, a committee which was appointed to inspect the security of the jail has suggested that the prison be shifted due to many high rise constructions around the jail.

In June 2021, during the COVID-19 pandemic, the superintendent of the prison wrote to BMC to ask them to start a vaccination drive for the prisoners.

In July 2021, eight new barracks were added to the jail which could house 200 additional inmates. There were several delays in construction, which lasted five years, due to shortage of funds. This was done in an attempt to alleviate the overcrowding situation, something that the prison authorities were frequently criticized for.

== Prison violence ==
The jail has seen instances of prison violence amongst gangs.

In 2006, a clash between the members of gangs belonging to Dawood Ibrahim and Chhota Rajan broke out. After this incident, the authorities started lodging opposing groups in different parts of the jail.

In 2010, a violent clash broke out between the gangster Abu Salem and Mustafa Dossa, who were the accused in the 1993 Bombay serial blasts, which let to Salem's face being slashed with a sharpened spoon.

== Notable inmates ==
- Sanjay Dutt, Bollywood actor who was imprisoned for illegal possession of weapons
- Ajmal Kasab, a Pakistani terrorist and member of Lashkar-e-Taiba who took part in the 2008 Mumbai attacks
- Abu Salem, terrorist and organised crime leader
- Aryan Khan, son of actor Shah Rukh Khan, was sent to this prison for drug related offence on Mumbai cruise
- Anil Deshmukh, former Minister for Home Affairs in the Government of Maharashtra between 2019 and 2021, is currently jailed pending his trial.
- Raj Kundra, British-Indian businessman, and husband of actress Shilpa Shetty was sent to this prison for a pornography case.
- Jayaprakash Narayan, Former Indian freedom fighter and politician, was arrested by British government and spents months in 1932
- Nawab Malik
- Chhagan Bhujbal, Politician, was jailed for alleged corruption
- Sanjay Raut
- Salman Khan, for 2002 hit and ran case

== Popular culture ==
The prison features in Gregory David Roberts' award-winning book Shantaram, which details his life on the run and his time spent in Mumbai, including a stint in Arthur Road. Several scenes in Katherine Boo's Behind the Beautiful Forevers take place in the facility.

== See also ==
- Harsul Central Jail
- Yerawada Central Jail
