= Attribution of the 2008 Mumbai attacks =

Attribution of the 2008 Mumbai attacks were first made by the Indian authorities who said that the Mumbai attacks were directed by Lashkar-e-Taiba militants inside Pakistan. American intelligence agencies also agree with this attribution. Pakistan initially contested this attribution, but agreed this was the case on 7 January 2009. To back up its accusations, the Indian government supplied a dossier to Pakistan's high commission in Delhi. The Pakistan government dismissed the dossier as "not evidence," but also announced that it had detained over a hundred members of Jamaat-ud-Dawa, a charity linked with Lashkar-e-Taiba. In February 2009, Pakistan's Interior Minister Rehman Malik agreed that "some part of the conspiracy" did take place in Pakistan.

Moreover, Indian government officials have said that the attacks were so sophisticated that they must have had official backing from Pakistani "agencies", an accusation denied by Pakistan.

== Attribution ==
The Mumbai attacks were planned and directed by Lashkar-e-Taiba militants inside Pakistan, and carried out by ten young armed men trained and sent to Mumbai and directed from inside Pakistan via mobile phones and VoIP.

In July 2009 Pakistani authorities confirmed to their Indian counterparts that their investigations confirmed that LeT plotted and financed the attacks. Investigations conducted in LeT camps in Karachi and Thatta revealed diaries, training manuals, maps of India and operational instructions. According to a report from Pakistani investigators to Indian authorities, "the investigation has established beyond any reasonable doubt that the defunct LeT activists conspired, abetted, planned, financed and established [the] communication network to carry out terror attacks in Mumbai."

The criminal investigation begun by the Mumbai police has identified 37 suspects – including two army officers – wanted for their alleged involvement in the plot. All but two of the suspects, many of whom are identified only through aliases, are Pakistani.

David Headley was a member of Lashkar-e-Taiba, and between 2002 and 2009 Headley travelled extensively as part of his work for LeT. Headey received training in small arms and countersurveillance from LeT, built a network of connections for the group, and was chief scout in scoping out targets for the Mumbai attacks.

Lashkar-e-Taiba was created and sponsored by Pakistan's intelligence agency, the Inter-Services Intelligence Directorate (ISI). US officials have stated that current or retired ISI officers probably played some role in the Mumbai attacks. An ISI officer known as Major Iqbal gave Headley $25,000 in cash in 2006 to scout out the target sites in Mumbai, helped him arrange a communications system for the attack, and oversaw a model of the Taj Mahal Hotel so that gunmen could know their way inside the target, according to Headley's testimony to Indian authorities. Headley also helped ISI recruit Indian agents to monitor Indian troop levels and movements, according to a US official. At the same time, Headley was also an informant for the US Drug Enforcement Administration, and Headley's wives warned American officials of Headley's involvement with LeT and his plotting of terrorist operations, warning specifically that the Taj Mahal Hotel may be their target.

=== Cooperation by Pakistan ===
Pakistan initially contested that Pakistanis were responsible for the attacks, but agreed this was the case on 7 January 2009.

A year after the attacks, Mumbai police continued to complain that Pakistani authorities are not co-operating by providing information for their investigation. Meanwhile, journalists in Pakistan said security agencies were preventing them from interviewing people from Kasab's village.

The Indian government supplied evidence to Pakistan's high commission in Delhi, in the form of interrogations, weapons, and call records of conversations during the attacks. The evidence, shown to friendly governments and media, provided a detailed sequence of training, supplying, and constant communications of attackers with handlers from Pakistan. In addition, Indian government officials said that the attacks were so sophisticated that they must have had official backing from Pakistani "agencies", an accusation denied by Pakistan.

In February 2009, Pakistani newspaper Dawn, citing Pakistani investigators, claimed that the attacks were planned in Bangladesh and refined in India with significant support being provided by Indian-based militant groups and criminal organisations. However, Indian investigators refuted this claim, with the Home Minister Palaniappan Chidambaram dismissing the claim as "rubbish". On 12 February 2009, Pakistan's Interior Minister Rehman Malik agreed that some part of the conspiracy did take place in Pakistan. Malik said that Pakistan had lodged a First Information Report (FIR) under Anti-Terrorism Act against three persons.

Pakistani Foreign Minister Shah Mehmood Qureshi said on 15 February 2009 that the 2007 Samjhauta Express bombings and the Mumbai attacks were linked, and that Pakistan needed information from India to continue its investigation.

=== Attackers ===
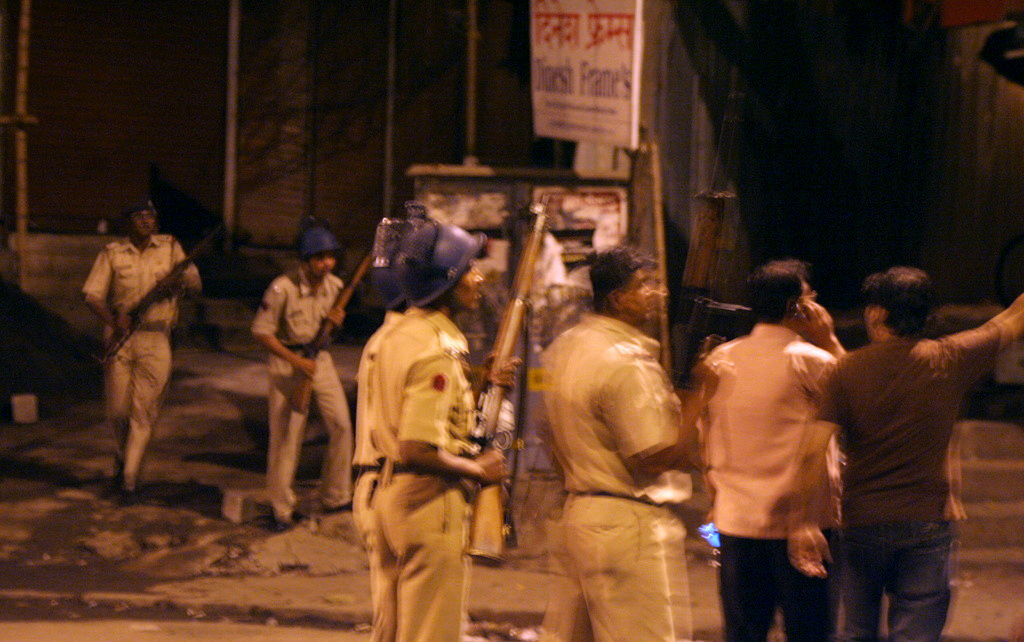
Police looking for attackers outside Colaba

There were ten gunmen, nine of whom were subsequently shot dead and one captured by security forces. Witnesses reported that they looked to be in their early twenties, wore black T-shirts and jeans, and that they smiled and looked happy as they shot their victims.

It was initially reported that some of the attackers were British citizens, but the Indian Government later stated that there was no evidence to confirm this. Similarly, early reports of twelve gunmen were also later shown to be incorrect.

On 9 December, the ten attackers were identified by Mumbai police, along with their home towns in Pakistan: Ajmal Amir from Faridkot, Abu Ismail Dera Ismail Khan from Dera Ismail Khan, Hafiz Arshad and Babr Imran from Multan, Javed from Okara, Shoaib from Sialkot, Nazih and Nasr from Faisalabad, Abdul Rahman from Arifwalla, and Fahad Ullah from Dipalpur Taluka. Dera Ismail Khan is in the North-West Frontier Province; the rest of the towns are in Pakistani Punjab.

=== Arrests ===
Ajmal Kasab was the only attacker captured alive by police and was hanged on 21 November 2012 at 7:30 am. Much of the information about the attackers' preparation, travel, and movements comes from his confessions to the Mumbai police.

On 12 February 2009 Pakistan's Interior Minister Rehman Malik said that Pakistani national Javed Iqbal, who acquired VoIP phones in Spain for the Mumbai attackers, and Hamad Ameen Sadiq, who had facilitated money transfer for the attack, had been arrested. Two other men known as Khan and Riaz, but whose full names were not given, were also arrested. Two Pakistanis were arrested in Brescia, Italy on 21 November 2009, after being accused of providing logistical support to the attacks.

In October 2009, two men were charged by the FBI for involvement in terrorism abroad, David Coleman Headley and Tahawwur Hussain Rana. Mumbai police suspect these two may be involved in the Mumbai attacks, too. Headley is reported to have posed as an American Jew and is believed to have links with terrorist outfits based in Bangladesh. Lashkar-e-Taiba, a Pakistan-based terrorist group, planned and executed the Mumbai attacks.

The attacks were directed by handlers inside Pakistan, and carried out by ten well-trained Pakistani attackers who travelled to Mumbai by sea from Karachi via a hijacked trawler. Nine of the attackers were killed and one, Ajmal Amir, was captured alive.

The Indian government also says that former officers from the Pakistan Army and Pakistan's powerful and secretive Inter-Services Intelligence (ISI) intelligence agency helped train the Mumbai attackers. Police are also looking into possible Indian collaborators, also trained in Pakistan Four former ISI officers have been requested by the US to be placed on the UN Consolidated List of terrorists, which will permit sanctions on their bank accounts, as well as the Interpol wanted list.

Police are also looking into possible Indian collaborators, also trained in Pakistan.

== Investigations in Pakistan ==
The Government of Pakistan initially denied that any of the attackers were Pakistanis. On 6 January 2009, they admitted that "part of" the attacks were planned inside Pakistan. They accepted that Ajmal Amir Kasab, the only attacker captured alive, was Pakistani.

In the months since the attacks, police in Pakistan have produced their own dossier which adds information about the Lashkar-e-Taiba network and of the involvement of specific individuals in planning and training.

Pakistani authorities have arrested seven men linked to the Mumbai attacks, including Hammad Amin Sadiq, a homoeopathic pharmacist, who arranged bank accounts and secured supplies, and Zaki ur-Rehman Lakhvi, the chief of operations for Lashkar. They are searching for at least 13 other suspects.

But their investigation has come up short of the founder of Lashkar, Hafiz Saeed, the man Indian and Western officials accuse of masterminding the attacks. In June 2009, a Pakistani court freed Mr. Saeed from detention, declaring it did not have enough evidence to hold him. He now has an international warrant out for his arrest, issued by Interpol.

== Attackers ==
The names and photographs of the ten attackers and their hometowns in Pakistan were released by Mumbai police on 9 December. All were from Punjab except Ismail Khan, who was from Dera Ismail Khan in the North-West Frontier Province.

Their names were difficult to establish because the alleged trainers of the attackers maintained "a system of changing the names of the members every few months, so that everyone had layers of names that were discarded over time."

Some of the terrorists booked a room in the Taj hotel posed as students using forged Mauritian identity documents and credit cards, but there is no evidence any of them were actually from Mauritius, which is an Indian Ocean island nation.

Each attacker carried a dozen hand grenades, a 9×19mm handgun with two 18-round magazines and an AK-47, seven to nine 30-round magazines and more than 100 rounds of loose ammunition. Each terrorist also carried a 17.6-pound (8 kg) bomb. Three of these bombs were recovered and defused, while the others exploded during the attacks. To navigate to Mumbai by sea and to find some targets, the terrorists used Global Positioning System handsets.

On 2 December, the number of ten terrorists, all coming into Mumbai from Karachi via a hijacked trawler, was repeated by Mumbai Police Commissioner Hassan Gafoor. He detailed that the terrorists broke up into five groups of two men each.

One attacker, Mohammad Ajmal Amir, is known to be a Pakistani national. The Pakistani government denies it, but some reporters have visited the small town in Pakistan where he said his family lives, and verified it. In addition, Mohammed Ajmal Amir was able to identify his home town on Google Maps, and pointed out places he used to hang out as a teenager.

The Observer stated that it had found Ajmal Amir's parents in the electoral record for "Faridkot, near Depalpur" containing 478 registered voters, and described comments from villagers about Ajmal Amir and about the village being "an active recruiting ground" for Lashkar-e-Taiba. The BBC also reported confirmation from local villagers and the presence of numerous intelligence officials at Ajmal Amir's family's house.

The Indian government supplied a dossier to Pakistan's high commission in Delhi, containing interrogations, weapons, and call records of conversations during the attacks. Shown to friendly governments and media, it provides a detailed sequence of training, supplying, and constant communications with handlers from Pakistan. The Pakistan government dismissed the dossier as "not evidence," but also announced that it had detained over a hundred members of Jamaat-ud-Dawa, a charity linked with Lashkar-e-Taiba.

On 12 February 2009, Pakistan's Interior Minister Rehman Malik has agreed that some part of the conspiracy did take place in Pakistan. Malik said that Pakistan has lodged the FIR under Anti-Terrorism Act against three persons.

Pakistani Foreign Minister Shah Mehmood Qureshi said on 15 February 2009 that the 2007 Samjhauta Express bombings and the Mumbai attacks were linked, and that Pakistan needed information from India to continue its investigation.

To answer 30 question that Pakistan had given to India on the attack, India provided a 400-page dossier which they claim will be adequate enough to answer all the questions.

== List of attackers ==
- Mohammad Ajmal Amir (aka Ajmal Amir Kamal, Ajmal Amir Kasab, Azam Ameer Qasab,, Azam Amir Qasab, Mohammad Ajmal Qasam, Ajmal Mohammed Amir Kasab, or Mohammad Ajmal Amir Kasar) – Initially imprisoned by Indian Police, eventually sentenced to death and executed – Attacked the CST station, Cama Hospital. Captured after stealing Skoda Laura. Resident of Faridkot, Okara in the tehsil of Depalpur in Pakistan's Punjab province. The 21-year-old man was recruited from his Punjab, Pakistan home in part based on a pledge by recruiters to pay $1,250 to his family when he became a martyr. The Pakistani government denies this man is from Pakistan, but several reporters have visited the small town in Pakistan where he said his family lives, and verified it.
- Abu Ismail Khan (aka Abu Dera Ismail Khan, Ismail Khan) (group leader) – Dead – from Dera Ismail Khan; attacked CST station, Cama Hospital with Mohammad Ajmal Amir (Azam Amir Qasab). Killed in stolen Skoda Laura. Originally from Dera Ismail Khan in Pakistan's Northwest Frontier Province, he was 25 years old.
- Fahad Ullah (aka Shadullah, Fahadullah, Abu Fahad) – Dead –Age 24, from Dipalpur Taluka. Attacked Hotel Oberoi. Called India TV and claimed to be part of Deecan Mujahideen. Claimed to be one of seven attackers in the Oberoi.
- Mohammed Altaf (aka Abdul Rehaman Chota) – Dead – from Arifwala Multan Road. Attacked the Oberoi Hotel.
- Babar Imaran (aka Imran Babar, Abu Akasha) – Dead – from Multan. Attacked Nariman House. Claimed to be one of five in Nariman House. Claimed to be 25 and a medical representative of a multinational corporation.
- Nasir (aka Abu Umar) – Dead – Age 28. Oldest of attackers. From Faisalabad. Attacked Nariman House.
- Nazir (aka Abu Umer) – Dead – Also from Faisalabad. Attacked Taj Palace Hotel and Leopold Cafe.
- Shoaib (aka Soheb) – Dead – from Sialkot, Narowal District. Youngest of attackers. Age 18. Attacked Taj Palace Hotel and Leopold Cafe.
- Javed (aka Abu Ali) – Dead – From Okara. Attacked Taj Palace Hotel.
- Hafeez Arshad (aka Hafiz Arshad, Abdul Rehaman Bada) –Dead – Age 25, from Multan. Attacked Taj Palace Hotel

== Alleged controllers in Pakistan ==
- Hafiz Muhammad Saeed – Living in Pakistan – Founder of Lashkar-e-Taiba (LeT) and amir of its political arm, Jamaat-ud-Dawa (JuD). Maintains LeT was uninvolved in the attack. India has demanded Pakistan arrest him and extradite him to India.
- Zaki-ur-Rehman Lakhvi – In custody of Pakistan military – Senior member of Lashkar-e-Taiba. Named as being one of the masterminds of the Mumbai attack. Said by US officials to have been involved in operations in Chechnya, Bosnia and Kashmir, where he allegedly trained LeT operatives to carry out suicide attacks.
- Masood Azhar – In custody of Pakistan military – Wanted by India in connection with the attacks on the Indian Parliament in 2001. Involvement with present Mumbai bombings unspecified. Leader and founder of Jaish-e-Mohammed (JeM).
- Yusuf Muzammil – Status unknown, presumed living in Pakistan – senior member of Lashkar-e-Taiba. Named as the handler of Faheem Ansari, who was arrested in February 2008 scouting sites for attack in Mumbai, as well as mastermind of the attacks by surviving gunman Amjal Kamal.
- Zarar Shah – In Pakistani custody – one of Lashkar-e-Taiba's primary liaisons to the ISI. Investigators in India are also examining whether Mr. Shah, a communications specialist, helped plan and carry out the attacks in Mumbai. "He's a central character in this plot," an American official said. Zarar Shah confessed to Pakistani authorities that LeT carried out the attacks, according to the Wall Street Journal.
- Hamad Ameen Sadiq – In Pakistani custody – Pakistan's Federal Investigation Agency calls him the "main operator". His bank accounts facilitated money transfer, and his arrest on 12 February 2009 led to information about the hide-outs of two others accused.
- Abu Hamza – Presumed living in Pakistan – Senior member of Lashkar-e-Taiba, gave the attackers maritime training, along with advanced lessons in explosives and weapons.
- Khafa (single name) – Presumed living in Pakistan – Senior member of Lashkar-e-Taiba, helped familiarise the gunmen with their targets during the final phase of training.
- Muhammad Ashraf – LeT's top financial officer. Not directly connected to the Mumbai plot. Added by the U.N., after the 2008 Mumbai blasts, to the list of people who sponsor terrorism.
- Mahmoud Mohamed Ahmed Bahaziq – The leader of LeT in Saudi Arabia and one of its financiers. Not directly connected to the Mumbai plot. Added by the U.N., after the 2008 Mumbai blasts, to the list of people who sponsor terrorism.

== Scouts ==
- David Coleman Headley, a Pakistani-American, and Tahawwur Hussain Rana, a Pakistani-Canadian, were arrested in Chicago in October 2009 in a different matter. But Indian investigators are looking at these two closely because they made multiple trips to India prior to the attacks and may have scouted locations.

== Indian collaborators ==
As of 6 December, there are at least two groups of possible Indian collaborators being investigated:

- Surveillance Team – One group of six men, consisting of Faheem Ahmed Ansari, Saba'uddin Ahmed, and others, already in police custody for a separate bombing in northern India, who may have conducted surveillance of the Mumbai landmarks that were attacked.
- SIM Card Suppliers – A second group, consisting of Tauseef Rahman, Mukhtar Ahmed, who purchased the SIM cards that were used in the Mumbai attackers' phones.

=== Surveillance team ===
Faheem Ahmed Ansari, an Indian from Mumbai, is a suspected collaborator. His group of six Indian men were initially arrested in connection with an attack on a police station in northern India. Ansari had also carried out reconnaissance of targets in Mumbai earlier in the year. He was caught with hand-drawn sketches of 8 to 10 Mumbai landmarks.

This group said they had been directed by two Lashkar-e-Taiba leaders: Zaki ur-Rehman Lakhvi, and a man known alternately as Yusuf or Muzammil—the same people who directed the Mumbai attackers by phone from Pakistan.

- Faheem Ahmed Ansari – Under arrest in India – Indian citizen, resident of Goregaon. Arrested in Rampur, northern India, in February 2008 with hand-drawn maps, sketches of targeted sites. Ansari worked in Saudi Arabia in 2006, from where he said he was recruited by the Lashkar-e-Taiba and given a Pakistani passport, then trained in Pakistan. Claims to have carried out reconnaissance in the fall of 2007 against 8–9 targets including the attacked hotels, the US Consulate, the Mumbai stock exchange, and other sites. Named Yuuf Muzammil as his Lashkar-e-Taiba handler in Pakistan, and claimed to have been trained in Muzaffarabad, Pakistan. A senior STF officer said, "Fahim guided the ATS to all the attack sites, particularly the Taj and CST, which he'd surveyed. He had sent the information by e-mail to somebody in Pakistan." The report went on to say, "Fahim used more than 16 e-mail accounts to communicate with his handlers. He sent them nine scanned copies of handmade maps. His disclosures were later cross-checked with another Pakistani militant Sabauddin, who was arrested for the Rampur attack."
- Sabauddin Ahmed (aka Saba'uddin Ahmed) – Under arrest in India. May have provided help to the Mumbai attackers. Arrested along with Faheem Ansari in February 2008. He is a well-educated young man from an affluent family in Bihar, who said he had been trained both by Lashkar-e-Taiba and by an ISI operator for four months.

On 18 December Both Mohammad Faheem Ansari and Sabauddin Ahmed were taken on remand to Mumbai by a Mumbai Crime Branch team.

=== SIM card suppliers ===
Two Indian men were arrested in Kolkata on 6 December for illegally buying mobile phone cards used by the gunmen in the Mumbai attacks. It is not known whether the two had advance knowledge of the attacks.

Tauseef Rahman allegedly bought SIM cards by providing fake documents, including identification cards of dead people, and sold them to Mukhtar Ahmed.

Ahmed is suspected to be an undercover policeman based in Srinagar.

- Tausif Rehman, Muktar Ahmed – Under arrest in India – On 6 December 2008, two men were arrested in Calcutta, India, in connection with the Mumbai attacks, charged with conspiracy and forgery. These two men were being questioned in connection with selling of 22 cell phone Subscriber Identity Module (SIM) cards to the Mumbai attackers. One of the men was said to be from West Bengal and the other was from Kashmir. The Kashmiri suspect was at first believed to be a police officer. Later the two men were identified as Tausif Rehman, a clerk from Howrah Station, and Mukhtar Ahmed, an auto-rickshaw (three-wheel taxi) driver of Kolkata. Rehman used the identity documents of a dead relative to acquire the SIM cards, and later sold the cards to Ahmed.

== Erroneous reports and theories ==
There was enormous media coverage during and immediately after the attacks, and many of the early reports turned out to be erroneous in some details. The Government of Pakistan repeatedly dismissed claims that the attackers were Pakistani, presented alternative theories, and sought to link the attacks with other bombing incidents which, they claimed, the Indian government was responsible for. Similarly, many news outlets carried opinions and unattributed theories, which also caused confusion.

== See also ==
- Allegations of state terrorism committed by Pakistan
