= Leopold Cafe =

Restaurant in Mumbai, Maharashtra, India

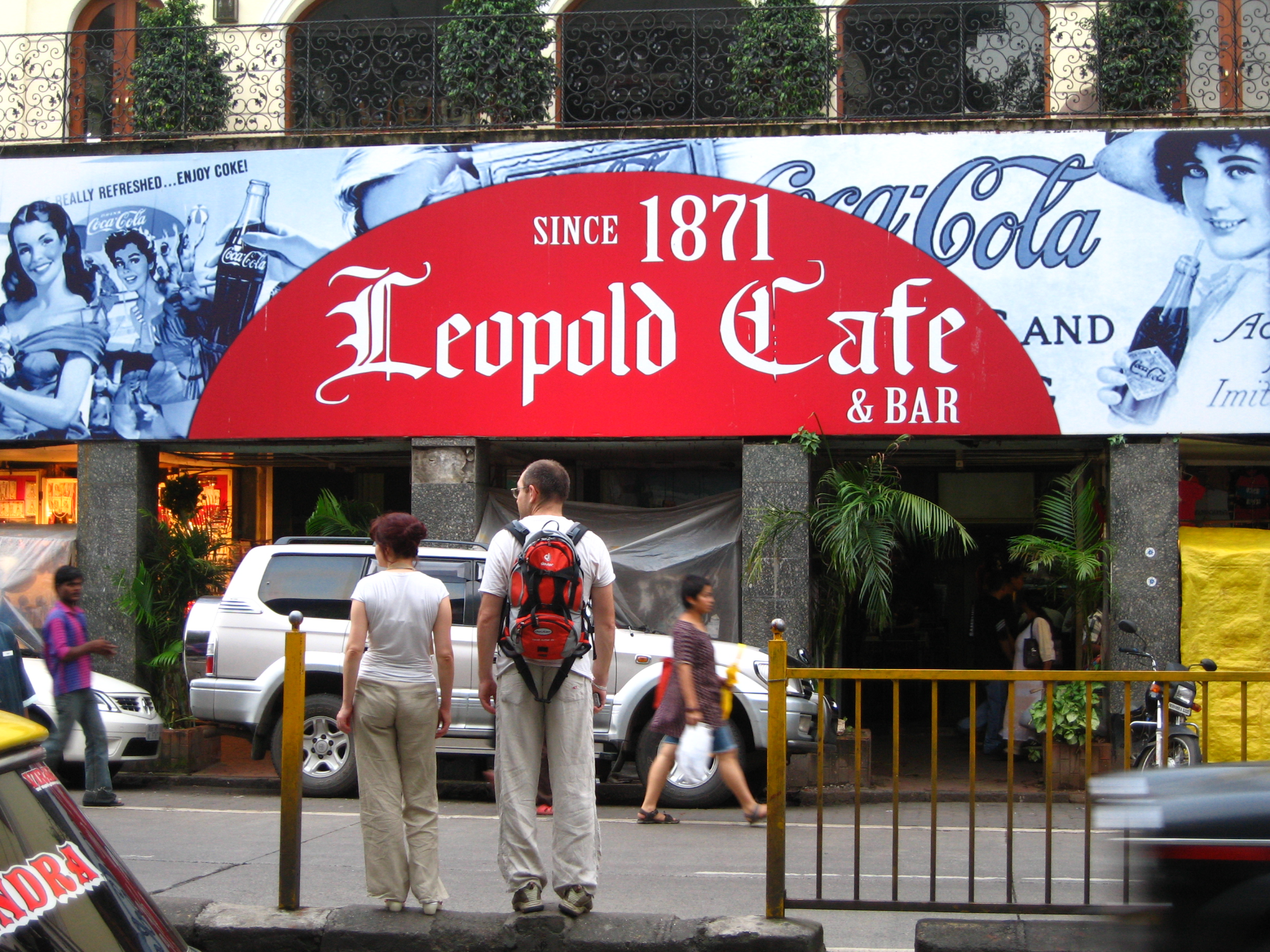
- Leopold Cafe pictured in 2007
- Interactive map of Leopold Cafe

Restaurant information
- Established: 1871; 155 years ago
- Owners: Farzad Jehani, Deenyar Jehani
- Food type: multi-cuisine
- Location: Mumbai, Maharashtra, India
- Coordinates: 18°55′22″N 72°49′54″E
- Other information: Open Daily 7:30am-12am

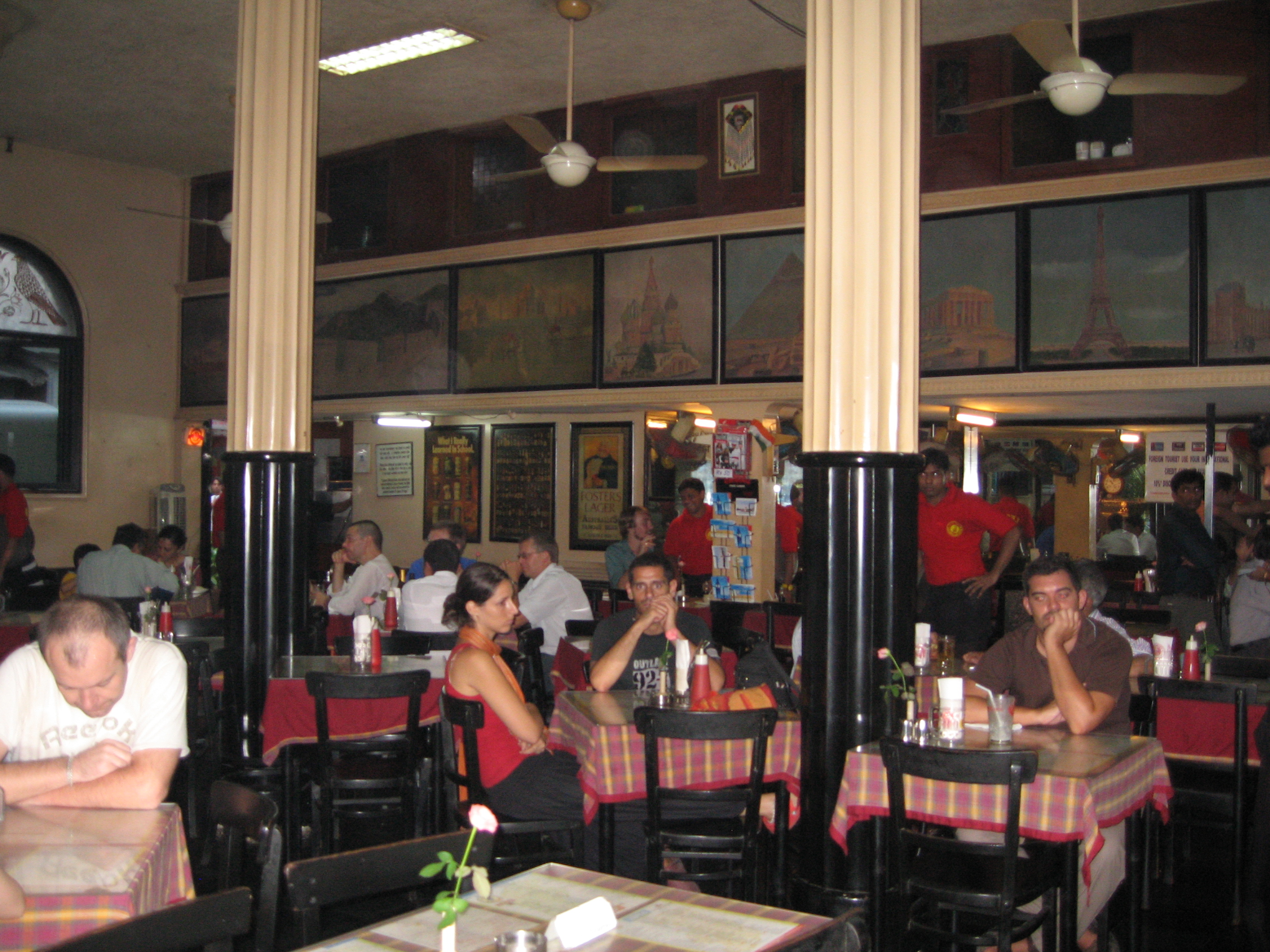
Interior, September 2007

The Leopold Cafe and Bar is a restaurant and bar on Colaba Causeway, Colaba, Mumbai, India, located across from the Colaba Police station. It was one of the first sites attacked in the 2008 Mumbai attacks.

== History ==
The Leopold Cafe was founded in 1871 by Iranis (a term used for Zoroastrians in Mumbai who arrived in India in the 19th century, as opposed to "Parsis") and named after King Leopold of the Belgians. These Zoroastrian Iranians came to India in the late 19th and early 20th century, and many of them opened restaurants now often termed Irani cafés. It first started out as a wholesale cooking oil store and over the years has variously been a restaurant, store and pharmacy (hence the name "Leopold Cafe & Stores").

Prior to the terrorist attack, the cafe was particularly known as a popular hangout for foreign tourists. After the attack, it is now also popular with many Indians to commemorate the spirit of defiance. The Leopold Cafe has preserved some of the signs of the attack as a memorial, whereas at the Taj Mahal Palace Hotel and the Trident Hotel, the damage from the attacks has been repaired.

The cafe uses an Achaemenid Persian Lion Rhyton as a part of its logo to indicate its Zoroastrian affiliation.

The cafe is one of few Irani cafes that are still comfortably in business, while many others are fading away.

== 2008 Mumbai attacks ==
The cafe was an early site of gunfire and grenade explosions during the 2008 Mumbai attacks by terrorists on 26 November, at about 9:30 PM. The terrorists, approximately an hour after landing, fired shots into the restaurant from outside, killing 11 people and injuring 28 people. The restaurant was extensively damaged during the attacks. Sourav Mishra, a Reuters reporter and one of the first media witnesses of the attack, suffered severe bullet injuries. After spending one and a half minutes at the Leopold Cafe, the terrorists walked over to the Taj Mahal Palace Hotel, the main target.

The cafe defiantly reopened four days after the attack, but was reclosed on the recommendation of the police as a safety measure after two hours, due to the unexpectedly large size of crowds gathering there.

== In popular culture ==
The cafe was also mentioned extensively in the novel Shantaram and its sequel The Mountain Shadow. Shantaram is about an Australian bank robber and heroin addict who escapes from jail and flees to Bombay, as Mumbai was formerly called. Of all the very typical "Bombay" things and places mentioned in the book is the Leopold Café. The novel was the reason many patrons returned after the attack.

== See also ==
- Irani café
- Café Mondegar
- Timeline of the 2008 Mumbai attacks
