= India First =

India First is an English-language news weekly published from Bhubaneswar, Odisha. The news weekly was launched in 2004 by journalists Sourav Mishra, Satya Nayak, Shubhanker Behera promoted by business person Sanjay Hans. Entrepreneurial English Publications Mishra, Nayak and Behera left the venture within a year after a successful launch.
