= Sourav Mishra =

Journalist, artist

- ସୌରଭ ମିଶ୍ର
- Born: 1 July 1979 (age 46); Bhubaneswar, Odisha, India
- Occupation: Journalist
- Employer(s): Wall Street Journal, Reuters News
- Height: 5 ft 9 in (175 cm)

Sourav Mishra (Odia: ସୌରଭ ମିଶ୍ର (saurabh mishra), born 1 July 1979) is an Indian journalist and artist. As a Reuters journalist he was one of the first witnesses and victim of the 2008 Mumbai attacks, a three-day rampage in which more than 164 people lost their lives. Mishra was with friends at Leopold Café when the terrorists opened fire on 26 November 2008. The café, a popular joint in South Mumbai, was one of the first locations to be targeted by the gunmen. Mishra received severe bullet injuries below his left shoulder and was taken to St. George's Hospital before being moved to a private hospital. His name also appeared in the state government's initial list of the dead, which was later withdrawn.

== Career ==
Mishra began his career as a development worker in the southern districts of Jharkhand state influenced by Deep Joshi of PRADAN. He worked with Down To Earth, a science and environment magazine, which focuses on grass-root issues. He also published a seminal paper along with Sunita Narain, director of the Centre for Science and Environment. The paper has often been cited by industry experts and was also discussed by policymakers for inclusion in the National Commission on Farmers report and was instrumental in government increasing cotton prices by 40 percent to prevent farmer suicides . A bio-terrorism expert, Mishra has also shared his expertise during talks at the Institute of Defence and Strategic Analyses, India's research body of the army.

Mishra has done some grass root innovations in water conservation, maize cultivation and small-scale irrigation for local farmers in southern districts of Jharkhand, along with members of International Water Management Institute He along with other pioneers introduced System of Rice Intensification in many parts of Jharkhand and Orissa at a grassroot level.

He had previously worked with The Times Group, The Statesman and The Indian Express, reporting on economic, financial, political and social issues. In 2004, Mishra, along with journalists Satya Nayak, Subhanker Behera, and business person Sanjay Hans launched India First news weekly, which was his only entrepreneurial venture so far. Mishra and Nayak are no more a part of the venture. Mishra is an artist and specialising in renaissance and modern art forms. His most famous painting is 'Sorrow of Mumbai' now preserved at Reuters News's Mumbai office.

Mishra is an alumnus of the Indian Institute of Mass Communication and Banaras Hindu University.
