= Harsul Central Jail =

Central jail of Maharashtra, India

- Interactive map of Harsul Central Jail
- Location: Aurangabad, Maharashtra, India; 19.9162981°N 75.3495028°E
- Status: Operational
- Security class: Maximum
- Capacity: 800
- Population: 1600 (2014)
- Managed by: Government of Maharashtra

Harsul Central Jail also known as Aurangabad Central Jail is one of 9 central jails of Maharashtra state of India and among the 5 most important central jails in the state. It is in Aurangabad city of Marathwada region.

== Overview ==
Jail is a high security jail. Total area of the jail is 12 hectares. Jail has more than 250 cctv cameras and 19 barracks. Official capacity of the jail is 700 but as of 2014, there are 1600 prisoners in jail. Capacity of jail can be increased to 2000. There are separate barracks for woman prisoners. Jail has video conference rooms for undertrials.

== Programs ==
Harsul central prison have set up a stall at a city-based mall for selling articles such as wooden furniture among others prepared by its inmates. This is the first such experiment by the prison authorities in the Maharashtra state. Various NGOs also conduct recreational activities in the prison.

== Prisoners ==
The inmates include criminals from across the country, members of the underworld, foreign nationals booked under NDPS Act, MCOCA detainees, 1993 serial blast convicts, a suspected militant and some high-profile multi-crore scam accused. Among 4 convicts of 1993 Mumbai bomb blasts in Harsul prison, 2 namely Yusuf Memon and Isa Memon are brothers of Yakub Memon who was hanged in Nagpur Central Jail for involvement in same crime.

- Isa Lemon
- Yusuf Memon

== See also ==
- Mumbai Central Jail
- Yerawada Central Jail
