= Timeline of the 2008 Mumbai attacks =

This is a timeline of the 2008 Mumbai attacks.

== Warnings given to Taj Hotel and the Centre ==
In October, US intelligence agencies warned Ratan Tata, the chairman of the company that owned the hotel (Taj Hotels), that there would be a terrorist attack on the Taj Mahal Palace Hotel. Security was increased, but was removed soon after.

On 18 November, Indian intelligence agencies intercepted a satellite phone call to a leader of Lashkar-e-Taiba terrorist organization, which revealed plans for a sea borne attack.

== Entry into India and initial attacks ==
Date	Estimated Time (+0530 UTC)	Event
21 Nov	night	Ten terrorists leave Karachi, Pakistan on the cargo ships Al Fauz and Al Hussaini and travel for thirty-eight hours, remaining undetected by the Indian Navy.
22 Nov		Each of the 10 men is given 6 to 7 magazines of 30 rounds each plus 400 rounds not loaded in magazines, 8 hand grenades, one AK-47 assault rifle, an automatic loading revolver, credit cards and a supply of dried fruit.
23 Nov	16:30	The terrorists hijack an Indian trawler, the MV Kuber, killing four fishermen and ordering the captain to sail to India.
26 Nov	dusk	They reach within four nautical miles (7 kilometres) of Mumbai and kill the captain. They then proceed to board three inflatable speedboats and proceed towards Colaba jetty.
26 Nov	20:10	The first boat carrying around ten of them with several large bags docks at Macchimar Nagar, in Mumbai's Cuffe Parade neighbourhood, where six of the men disembark and the rest continue sailing along the shore. When local residents ask about their occupation, the group responds that they are students.
26 Nov	20:30	Another such incident plays out in Colaba, when the remaining men come ashore at Badhwar Park, Cuffe Parade. They reportedly tell local Marathi-speaking fishermen to mind their business before they split up and head two different ways.
26 Nov	21:20	Two terrorists attack Leopold Cafe, spraying bullets onto the people inside before fleeing. 10 people are killed and many are injured, including a Reuters news reporter. Terrorists also plant bombs in two taxis, killing 5 people and wounding 15.
26 Nov	21:20	Four of the men enter the Taj Mahal Hotel, two enter the Oberoi Trident, two enter Nariman House, and the other two men, Ajmal Kasab and Ismail, take a taxi to Chhatrapati Shivaji Terminus.
26 Nov	21:20	Armed with AK-47 and AK74U rifles, Kasab and Ismail enter the passenger hall of the Chhatrapati Shivaji Terminus railway station, opening fire and throwing grenades, killing 58 people and wounding 104.
26 Nov	22:30	Kasab and Ismail then proceed to the Cama Hospital. The Hospital staff, noticing their approach, lock all of the patients' rooms. The two men reach the Hospital, opening fire there. ATS chief Hemant Karkare attempts to chase them in a jeep, but is gunned down, along with three of his men. The terrorists then hijack the jeep and drive away, but are intercepted by a team from the Gamdevi police station near the pedestrian bridge at Girgaum Chowpatty (Coordinates: 18.955552°N 72.812909°E). Ismail is killed and Kasab is captured.

== At the Taj Mahal Palace and Tower Hotel ==
Sources: NDTV, Evening Standard, and BBC

Date	Estimated Time (+0530 UTC)	Event
26 Nov	23:00	Four terrorists enter Taj hotel.
27 Nov	00:00	Mumbai police surround the hotel.
27 Nov	01:00	Massive blast in the central dome, fire in the building.
27 Nov	02:30	Army soldiers arrive in two trucks and enter the front lobby. Fire spreads across the top floor.
27 Nov	03:00	Fire engines arrive. Shooting is heard inside lobby and heritage building.
27 Nov	04:00	Firemen rescue people with ladders. More than 200 people evacuated.
27 Nov	04:30	Terrorists reported to move from central dome to new tower.
27 Nov	05:00	Commandos and Bomb squad arrive. Police step up pressure.
27 Nov	05:30	Fire brought under control but terrorists holed up in new tower with 100 to 150 hostages.
27 Nov	06:30	Security forces say they are ready for encounter. Government also gives the green signal to storm the hotel.
27 Nov	08:00	People are brought out of the lobby.
27 Nov	08:30	Another 50 people brought out of Chambers Club.
27 Nov	09:00	More rounds of firing, many more people reported to be still inside.
27 Nov	10:30	Gun battle reported from inside hotel.
27 Nov	12:00	50 people evacuated.
27 Nov	16:30	Terrorists set fire to a room on the 4th floor
27 Nov	19:20	More National Security Guards (NSG) commandos arrive, enter hotel.
28 Nov	14:53	Six bodies recovered.
28 Nov	14:53 – 15:59	Ten grenade explosions.
28 Nov	15:00	Marine commandos recover explosives from Taj.
28 Nov	16:00	12 to 15 bodies recovered from the Taj by naval commandos.
28 Nov	19:30	Fresh explosions and gunshots at Taj Hotel.
28 Nov	20:30	Report that one terrorist remains at the Taj.
29 Nov	03:40 – 04:10	Reports of five explosions at the Taj.
29 Nov	04:20	The Taj Mahal Hotel is reported to be completely under government control.
29 Nov	05:05	Revised estimate of one terrorist remaining.
29 Nov	07:30	Fire raging on first floor. Black smoke on second floor. Gunshots heard frequently — apparent gun battle.
29 Nov	08:00	Indian commandos state that the Taj Hotel is now under control though they are still conducting room to room searches. People celebrate on the streets.

== At the Oberoi Trident ==
Date	Estimated Time	Event
27 Nov	06:00	Police don't do anything because they were not allowed to make decisions as situation was handed over to NSG.
27 Nov	08:40	Firing heard, head army, navy officers arrive and take stock.
27 Nov	13:30	Two small explosions. More reinforcements enter building.
27 Nov	15:25	Some foreign hostages rescued.
27 Nov	17:35	Jat regiment arrives, fierce gun battle.
27 Nov	18:00	27 hostages exit Air India building, four foreigners taken to hospital.
27 Nov	18:45	Explosion heard. Two NSG guards, 25 army personnel suspected injured. More people rescued, 31 in total.
27 Nov	19:25	Fire breaks out on 4th floor.
28 Nov	10:00	Many hostages evacuated from the Trident building.
28 Nov	15:00	Commando operations at Oberoi over, 24 bodies recovered. 143 hostages rescued alive. Two terrorists are shot dead.

== At Nariman House ==
Date	Estimated Time	Event
27 Nov	07:00	Police begin evacuating adjacent buildings.
27 Nov	11:00	Cross firing between terrorists and police; one terrorist injured.
27 Nov	14:45	Terrorists throw grenade into nearby lane; no casualties.
27 Nov	17:30	NSG commandos arrive, naval helicopter takes aerial survey.
28 Nov	00:00	9 hostages are rescued from the first floor.
28 Nov	07:30	NSG commandos are inserted via fast-rope from helicopters onto the roof of Nariman house. To prevent an attack on the commandos, snipers are positioned in nearby buildings.
28 Nov	19:30	Commandos find all 6 hostages, including the rabbi and his wife, tortured and murdered by the terrorists.
28 Nov	20:30	NSG commandos kill the 2 terrorists in a fierce gun battle and declare the operation over..
