= Mahmoud Mohamed Ahmed Bahaziq =

Indian-Saudi jihadist

- Born: 17 August 1943 (age 82); Hyderabad, India
- Other names: Abu 'Abd al-'Aziz
- Known for: Bosnian mujahideen; Lashkar-e-Taiba

Mahmoud Mohamed Ahmed Bahaziq (born 17 August 1943, Hyderabad) is an Indian-Saudi jihadist. He became known by his nom de guerre Abu 'Abd al-'Aziz after leading one of Bosnia's early mujahideen groups. Bahaziq is subject to United Nations Security Council sanctions for funding Lashkar-e-Taiba (LeT) since the 2008 Mumbai attacks.

== Early life ==
Bahaziq was born to a Hadhrami couple in Hyderabad, in the Indian subcontinent. When he was ten, the family moved to Jeddah, Saudi Arabia, where they received Saudi citizenship. Bahaziq graduated from high school in Syria in 1967. He later was employed by Saudia Airlines. He married his wife Azza in 1973.

== Joining the global jihad ==
In the 1980s, Bahaziq became interested in the Afghan jihad. He travelled to a training camp in Pakistan run by Osama bin Laden. He fought in Afghanistan in 1988 and came back to Pakistan, where he met members of Ahl-i Hadith movement. At that time, he became involved with the Islamist terrorist organization Lashkar-e-Taiba (LeT).

== Bosnian mujahideen ==
During the breakup of Yugoslavia, the Bosnia War erupted in April 1992. The same month, the Afghan War ended, and some mujahideen leaders decided to continue the jihad in Bosnia.

Bahaziq was one of the early movers. He and four other militants travelled to Zagreb, Croatia, to meet contacts and parted to Travnik in central Bosnia where they joined a new Muslim militia. During his participation in the Bosnia War, he adopted the kunya Abu 'Abd al-'Aziz as his nom de guerre.

In December 1992, Bahaziq left Bosnia and became proselytize and fundraise for the global jihad, travelling through the Arab world, the United States and the United Kingdom.

== Lashkar-e-Taiba funding ==
In the aftermath of the 2008 Mumbai attacks, the United Nations Security Council Al-Qaida and Taliban Sanctions Committee added Lashkar-e-Taiba to its sanctions lists. Later that year, Bahaziq was also listed as a financer of Lashkar-e-Taiba.
