= The Mountain Shadow =

2015 novel by Gregory David Roberts

- Hardcover edition
- Author: Gregory David Roberts
- Language: English
- Genre: Fiction
- Publisher: Grove Press
- Publication date: 13 October 2015
- Publication place: Australia
- Media type: Print, e-book, audiobook
- Pages: 912 pp.
- ISBN: 978-0802124456
- OCLC: 906121967
- Preceded by: Shantaram
- Website: Official website

The Mountain Shadow is a 2015 novel by Australian author Gregory David Roberts and is a sequel for his 2003 novel Shantaram. Grove Press initially released the book on 13 October 2015. This is the second book in the proposed trilogy.

== Plot ==
Set mostly in modern Bombay, the sequel starts where Shantaram ended. It's been two years since the protagonist Lindsay lost two of the people closest to him: Kaderbhai, a mafia boss who died in the Afghan mountains, and Karla, a mysterious, coveted woman who eventually married a Bombay media mogul. Now Lin has to fulfill the last assignment given to him by Kaderbhai—to win the trust of the sage living on the mountain, to save his head in the uncontrollably flaring conflict of the new mafia leaders, but, most importantly, to find love and faith.

== Reception ==
Akash Kapur of The New York Times wrote, "Gregory David Roberts’s “Shantaram” was an unlikely publishing sensation. Literary purists scoffed at its purple prose; Indian (and many other) readers bristled at its stereotypes and cultural simplifications. The book nonetheless possessed a grittiness and vividness that helped Roberts sell four million copies around the world. Hollywood rights were scooped up (though a film has yet to be made). The book has gone on to occupy a distinctive — and deserving — place in an emerging genre of Bombay noir." Tim Martin of the Financial Times noted, "Ten years in the writing, The Mountain Shadow is the first of three proposed sequels to Shantaram, and continues its mission to transmit as many conclusions about the universe as the author can get his hands on... What we get instead are those essential truths and passionate experiences, swarming through the book like locusts." Camron Woodhead of The Sydney Morning Herald commented, "Axiomatic pronouncements this bald, didactic and sentimental can't possibly approximate the contradictory power of artistic truth, of course, partly because such sloganeering and cod philosophy are routinely used to sell us stuff. They have more in common with Oprah than Proust, and most readers with a shred of intellect or self-respect, no matter how questing, will cringe at the extent to which large chunks of The Mountain Shadow resemble the snake oil of the self-help industry."
