= Faridkot, Pakpattan =

Union council in Punjab, Pakistan

Faridkot
- Union council
- Location in Punjab, Pakistan Faridkot (Pakistan)
- Coordinates: 30.22°N 73.33°E
- Country: Pakistan
- Province: Punjab
- Division: Sahiwal
- District: Pakpattan
- Tehsil: Pakpattan Tehsil
- Elevation: 150 m (490 ft)
- Time zone: UTC+5 (PST)

Faridkot is a union council in Pakpattan Tehsil, one of the third-tier administrative subdivisions of Pakpattan District in the Punjab province of Pakistan. The settlement lies in the eastern part of the district, north-east of the district capital, Pakpattan, at an elevation of approximately 150 metres (490 ft) above sea level.

== Geography ==
Faridkot is situated in the alluvial plain of the Sutlej River, which forms the southern boundary of Pakpattan District and the international border with India. The district is bounded to the north-west by Sahiwal District, to the north by Okara District, to the south-east by the Sutlej and Bahawalnagar District, and to the south-west by Vehari District. The local elevation is around 150 metres (490 ft) above mean sea level, characteristic of the broader Pakpattan plain.

== History ==
Faridkot lies in the historical hinterland of Pakpattan, which has long served as a regional centre on account of its position on the ferry crossing of the Sutlej. The district capital sits on the alignment of the historical Delhi–Multan road reconstructed by Sher Shah Suri, the landmarks of which are still in use along the route maintained by the Punjab Road Transportation Department.

Under British rule, Pakpattan was administered as the headquarters of a tehsil within Montgomery District (later Sahiwal District). On 1 July 1990, Pakpattan was carved out of Sahiwal District and re-designated as a district headquarters in its own right; for a brief period it was the only district in the country comprising a single sub-division. In 1995, Arifwala was incorporated into the district as its second tehsil.

== Administration ==
Pakpattan District is divided into two tehsils: Pakpattan and Arifwala, which together entail 54 union councils, of which 33 fall within Pakpattan Tehsil. Faridkot is one of the union councils of Pakpattan Tehsil. As Pakistan's third-tier local-government units, union councils are headed by an elected chairperson and are responsible for local civic administration.
