= Ajmal Kasab =

Pakistani militant (1987–2012)

- اجمل قصاب
- Photograph shot by Sebastian D'Souza from the Mumbai Mirror of Ajmal Kasab in the Chhatrapati Shivaji Terminus during the 2008 Mumbai attacks
- Born: Muhammad Ajmal Amir Kasab; 13 September 1987; Faridkot, Punjab, Pakistan
- Died: 21 November 2012 (aged 25); Yerawada Central Jail, Pune, Maharashtra, India
- Cause of death: Execution by hanging
- Known for: 2008 Mumbai attacks
- Status: Executed
- Motive: Islamic extremism
- Convictions: Murder; Conspiracy; Waging war against India; Possession of explosives
- Penalty: Death

Details
- Date apprehended: 27 November 2008

Muhammad Ajmal Amir Kasab (Note: Urdu: محمد اجمل عامر قصاب) (13 September 1987 – 21 November 2012) was a Pakistani terrorist, mass murderer and a member of the Salafi jihadist militant organization Lashkar-e-Taiba through which he took part in the 2008 Mumbai attacks. Kasab, alongside fellow Lashkar-e-Taiba recruit Ismail Khan, killed 72 people during the attacks, most of them at Chhatrapati Shivaji Terminus. Kasab was the only attacker who was apprehended alive by the police.

Kasab was born in Faridkot, Pakistan and left his home in 2005, engaging in petty crime and armed robbery with a friend. In late 2007, he and his friend encountered members of Jama'at-ud-Da'wah, the political wing of Lashkar-e-Taiba, distributing pamphlets, and were persuaded to join.

On 3 May 2010, Kasab was found guilty of 80 offences, including murder, waging war against India, possessing explosives, and other charges. On 6 May 2010, he was sentenced to death on four counts and to life imprisonment on five counts. Kasab's death sentence was upheld by the Bombay High Court on 21 February 2011. The verdict was upheld by the Supreme Court of India on 29 August 2012. Kasab was executed by hanging on 21 November 2012 at 7:30 a.m. Indian Standard Time, and subsequently buried within the precincts of Yerwada Central Jail in Pune in a secret grave away way down as to avoid becoming an extremist pilgrimage spot, as Pakistan and Kasab's family refused to carry his body. He was the first person to be executed in India since 2004, when Dhananjoy Chatterjee had raped and murdered an 18-year-old girl, Hetal Parekh, and was hanged at Kolkata's Alipore Central Jail on 14 August 2004.

== Early life ==
Kasab was born in Faridkot village in the Okara District of Punjab, Pakistan, to Noor Elahi and Muhammad Amir of the Qassab community. In the aftermath of the Mumbai attacks, it was initially assumed Kasab was from Faridkot, Khanewal; however, Khanewal police were unable to find anyone of his name, and he was later determined to be from the village of the same name in Okara. His father ran a snack cart while his elder brother, Afzal, worked as a labourer in Lahore. His elder sister, Rukaiyya Husain, was married and lived in the village. A younger sister, Suraiyya, and brother, Munir, lived in Faridkot with their parents.

Kasab briefly joined his brother in Lahore and then returned to Faridkot. He left home after a fight with his father in 2005. He had asked for new clothes on Eid al-Fitr, but his father could not provide them, which made him angry. He engaged in petty crime with his friend Muzaffar Lal Khan, eventually moving on to armed robbery. On 21 December 2007, Eid al-Adha, they were in Rawalpindi trying to buy weapons in Raaja Bazaar when they encountered members of Jama'at-ud-Da'wah, the political wing of Lashkar-e-Taiba, distributing pamphlets. They decided to sign up for training with the group, ending up at their base camp, Markaz Taiba.

An interrogator and deputy commissioner of the Mumbai Police stated that Kasab spoke rough Hindi and almost no English. He said his father in effect sold him to Lashkar-e-Taiba so that he could use the money they gave him to support the family. His father denied it. Zaki-ur-Rehman Lakhvi, a senior commander of Lashkar-e-Taiba, reportedly offered to pay his family ₨150,000 for his participation in the attacks. Another report said the 23-year-old was recruited from his home, in part, based on a pledge by recruiters to pay ₨100,000 to his family if he became a martyr. Other sources put the reward at US$4,000.

Villagers in Okara claimed on camera that he was at their village six months before the attacks in Mumbai. They said that he asked his mother to bless him as he was going for jihad and claimed that he demonstrated his wrestling skills to a few village boys that day.

== Training ==
Ajmal Kasab was among a group of 24 men who received training in marine warfare at a remote camp in the mountainous areas of Muzaffarabad, Azad Jammu and Kashmir, Pakistan. Part of the training was reported to have taken place on the Mangla Dam reservoir.

== Involvement in 2008 Mumbai attacks ==
Kasab was seen on CCTV during his attacks at Chhatrapati Shivaji Terminus along with another recruit, Ismail Khan. Kasab reportedly told the police that they wanted to replicate the Islamabad Marriott hotel attack, and reduce the Taj Hotel to rubble, replicating the 9/11 attacks in India.

On the evening of 26 November 2008, after entering Mumbai via sea route, leaving the Karachi port on smaller boats, then boarding the cargo ship Al Fauz and its sister vessel Al Hussaini, reached Indian waters, hijacked the MV Kuber, and then abandoned it 4 to 6 nautical miles of the coast of Mumbai, and got into an inflatable jetty, Kasab and his accomplice Ismail Khan, split up from the group of ten militants and hired a taxi to head to the Chhatrapati Shivaji Maharaj Terminus or CSMT (formerly Victoria Terminus, Chhatrapati Shivaji Terminus), one of Mumbai's busiest railway stations, during which they planted a time bomb in backseat. Armed with grenades and AK-47 assault rifles, Kasab and Khan attacked the CSMT railway station with, killing several commuters and long-distance travelers. Hearing the shots, a few police officers posted at the railway station, including Senior Inspector Shashank Shinde, tried to fight them with their service weapons but were also killed by Kasab and Khan. The duo later headed towards Cama Hospital with intent to kill patients, but the hospital staff locked all of the patient wards. A police team, consisting of Mumbai Anti-Terrorism Squad Chief Hemant Karkare, encounter specialist Vijay Salaskar and Additional Commissioner Ashok Kamte, along with other subordinates, were outside the hospital waiting to counter-attack them, armed with pistols, revolvers, and World War 2 era Lee–Enfield self-loading rifles. The duo then escaped the hospital and went into hiding, while Karkare, Kamte, Salaskar and 4 constables began to move to the other side of the hospital in a Toyota Qualis SUV, with Kamte at the wheel. While driving there, Kamte saw Kasab and fired at him, wounding his arm, but Khan and Kasab fired a volley of bullets, killing Karkare, Kamte, Salaskar, and 2 constables. After killing them in the gun battle and taking two constables' hostage in the Qualis, Kasab and Khan drove towards the Metro Cinema, where they fired at civilians, leaving many injured. Kasab joked about the bullet resistant vests worn by the police and killed one constable, Yogesh Patil, when his mobile phone rang. They then drove to Vidhan Bhavan where they fired more shots. The police vehicle they were in burst a rear tire due to bullets they fired, so they stole a silver Škoda Laura and drove towards Girgaum Chowpatty beach. At that point, the surviving but severely wounded constable, Arun Jadhav, sent a message on radio that Kasab and Khan carjacked and stole the Škoda, and were heading towards Chowpatty.

The D B Marg police station had received a message from police control room at about 10 pm, that two heavily armed men had gunned down commuters at CSMT. 15 policemen from D B Marg were sent to Chowpatty to set up a double barricade roadblock on Marine Drive. The Škoda reached Chowpatty and halted 40 to 50 feet from the barricade. The police officers at the roadblock ordered Khan and Kasab to exit and surrender, but instead they turned on the windshield wipers and high-beam headlights to prevent any visuals. Khan, who was on the driver's seat, reversed slightly and attempted a U-turn to escape, but failed, as the car was obstructed by a median. A shootout ensued, and Khan was killed after being shot in the head, while Kasab lay motionless playing dead. Assistant Sub-Inspector Tukaram Omble, armed only with a lathi (bamboo stick), charged the vehicle, being shot five times after he opened the passenger door, where Kasab was seated. Omble held onto Kasab's weapon, enabling Omble's colleagues to capture Kasab alive. A former Naik (equivalent of Corporal) in the Indian Army, Omble died from the bullet wounds on the spot. A mob of officers gathered and attacked Kasab, which was captured on video, and during the commotion, Assistant Police Inspector Sanjay Govilkar, who was also shot in the abdomen, yelled, "Don't kill him, he is evidence."

Initially, Kasab pretended to be dead, and was being transported to the Nair Hospital when a police officer discovered Kasab was breathing. Seeing the mutilated body of his partner Khan, Kasab begged doctors to put him on saline, saying "I do not want to die". The doctors who treated Kasab said he had no bullet wounds.

Kasab told police he was trained to "kill to the last breath". Later, after interrogation in the hospital by the police, he said: "Now, I do not want to live", requesting the interrogators kill him for the safety of his family in Pakistan, who could be killed or tortured for his surrender to Indian police. (Fidayeen suicide squad members were instructed not to be captured and interrogated, use aliases instead of their real names, and hide their nationality.) He is also quoted as saying "I have done right, I have no regrets". Reports also surfaced that the group planned to escape safely after the attack.

Kasab told interrogators that all through the operation, the Lashkar headquarters from Karachi, Pakistan, remained in touch with the group, calling their phones through a voice-over-Internet service. Investigators succeeded in reconstructing the group's journey through the Garmin GPS that was found on Kasab. An email sent from a group calling itself the Deccan Mujahideen claiming responsibility was traced to a Russian proxy, which was then traced back to Lahore with the help of the Federal Bureau of Investigation (FBI).

=== Nationality ===
Police announced Kasab was a Pakistani national based on his confession and other evidence. Several reporters visited Kasab's village and verified the facts provided by him. Former Prime Minister of Pakistan, Nawaz Sharif confirmed that Kasab was from Faridkot village in Pakistan, and criticised President Asif Ali Zardari for cordoning off the village and not allowing his parents to meet anyone.

Journalist Saeed Shah travelled to Kasab's village and produced national identity card numbers of his parents. His parents left town on the night of 3 December 2008. Mumbai Joint Police Commissioner of Crime Rakesh Maria said Kasab was from the Faridkot village in the Okara District of Pakistan's Punjab province and was the son of Mohammed Amir Kasab.

The Mumbai Police said much of the information that Kasab provided proved to be accurate. He disclosed the location of a fishing trawler, MV Kuber, that the militants used to enter Mumbai's coastal waters. He told investigators where his team put the ship captain's body, a satellite phone and a global-positioning device, which the police found.

Pakistani officials, including President Zardari, initially denied Ajmal Kasab was Pakistani. Pakistani government officials attempted to erase evidence that there was a Lashkar-e-Taiba office in Depalpur. The office was hurriedly closed in the week of 7 December. On the night of 3 December 2008, the parents were whisked away by a bearded mullah, and since then, there was evidence of a cover-up by plainclothes police. Villagers changed their stories, and reporters who visit there were intimidated. In early December, Kasab's father admitted in an interview that Kasab was his son.

In January 2009, Pakistan's National Security Advisor Mahmud Ali Durrani admitted to Kasab being a Pakistani citizen while speaking to the CNN-IBN news channel. The Government of Pakistan then acknowledged that Ajmal Kasab was a Pakistani, but also announced that Prime Minister Yousaf Raza Gilani had fired Durrani for "failing to take Gilani and other stakeholders into confidence" before making this information public, and for "a lack of coordination on matters of national security."

== Police interrogation ==
=== Naming confusion ===
On 6 December 2008, The Hindu reported that the police officers who interrogated him did not speak his language, Urdu, and misinterpreted his caste origin "kasai", meaning butcher, to be a surname, writing it as "Kasav".

The Times of India reported a different version of the error. The paper stated that the police officers correctly understood that Ajmal Kasab does not have a surname. To satisfy an administrative requirement that people have surnames, the officers asked Kasab for his father's profession, and decided to use "butcher", or "Kasab" in Urdu, as his surname.

The Hindu referred to him as either "Mohammad Ajmal Amir, son of Mohammad Amir Iman" or "Mohammad Ajmal Amir 'Kasab'".

List of various names used to refer to Kasab:

- Ajmal Kasab
- Azam Amir Kasav
- Ajmal Qasab
- Ajmal Amir Kamal
- Ajmal Amir Kasab
- Azam Ameer Qasab
- Mohammad Ajmal Qasam
- Ajmal Mohammed Amir Kasab
- Mohammad Ajmal Amir Kasar
- Amjad Amir Kamaal
- Mohammed Ajmal Amir Qasab
- Mohammed Ajmal Mohammad Amir Kasab

=== Confessions ===
Ammunition, a satellite phone and a layout plan of Chhatrapati Shivaji Maharaj Terminus was recovered from Kasab. He described how his team arrived at Mumbai from Karachi via Porbandar. He said that they had received revolvers, AK-47s, ammunition and dried fruit from their coordinator. Kasab told the police that they wanted to replicate the Marriott hotel attack in Islamabad, and reduce the Taj Hotel to rubble, replicating the September 11 attacks in the USA. Kasab told police that his team targeted Nariman House, where the Chabad centre was located, because it was frequented by Israelis, who were targeted to "avenge atrocities on Palestinians."

Kasab told the police that he and his associate, Ismail Khan, were the ones who shot Anti-Terror Squad chief Hemant Karkare, encounter specialist Vijay Salaskar and Additional Commissioner Ashok Kamte. Kasab entered the Taj posing as a student from Mauritius and stored explosives in one of the hotel's rooms. In December 2009, Kasab retracted his confession in court, claiming he had come to Mumbai to act in Bollywood films and was arrested by the Mumbai police three days before the attacks.

==== Confessions on video ====
Kasab repeatedly asked the interrogators to turn the camera off and warned them he would not speak otherwise. Nonetheless, the following confessions were recorded on video:

"We were told that our big brother India is so rich and we are dying of poverty and hunger. My father sells dahi wada in a stall in Lahore and we did not even get enough food to eat from his earnings. I was promised that once they knew that I was successful in my operation, they would give 150,000 rupees (around US$3,352), to my family," said Kasab.

Investigation officers of Mumbai Police said they were shocked by his readiness to switch loyalties after he was apprehended. "If you give me regular meals and money I will do the same for you that I did for them," he said.

In addition, Kasab also confessed about being brainwashed into believing that this was a religious war on the "Orders of God". He stated to Senior Inspector Ramesh Mahale in his confession that his handler Zaki-ur-Rehman Lakhvi told him once he dies in this act of jihad, he would go to jannat(heaven) and he was told that his body would smell like flowers, he would get angels in heaven. Mahale additionally revealed "He was brainwashed that Hindus are cruel to Muslims in India and Muslims don't get space to offer namaz. We showed him how Muslims offer namaz in the open with police protection".

Kasab eventually shared the location of LeT's training camps in Muridke, Pakistan, called as Markaz Taiba, and in Muzzafarabad, apart from the routine of their training. On 7 May 2025, the Muridke camp was destroyed in a missile strike by the Indian Armed Forces in retaliation for the 2025 Pahalgam attack. The strikes reportedly killed Lashkar's HQ chief Mudassar aka Abu Jundal(not to be confused with 26/11 co-conspirator Zabiuddin Ansari who used the alias Abu Jundal) among several other Islamist militants.

In the memoir Let Me Say It Now, which was released in February 2020, author and former Commissioner Rakesh Maria, stated about a thorough interrogation he conducted with Kasab. Elaborating on the perpetrators plans to mastermind the attack as a Hindu Terror conspiracy, Maria wrote,

If all had gone well, Kasab and all 9 other terrorists would have been dead with a red string tied around his wrist like a Hindu. We would have found an identity card on this person with fictitious name Samir Dinesh Choudhari, student of Arunoday Degree and P.G College.

Maria stated that Kasab's capture ruined the plans of Pakistan of proclaiming the Mumbai Terror Attack as a Hindu conspiracy. The book eventually led to an all-out political debate and accusations.

=== Face to face with Abu Jundal ===
On 9 August 2012, Kasab was brought face-to-face with Abu Jundal, the handler of the Mumbai attacks, at the Arthur Road Jail where they identified each other. Kasab also admitted that Jundal had taught him Hindi.

=== Other reports ===
In a press conference, the Police Commissioner of Mumbai said "The person we have caught alive is certainly a Pakistani. They were all trained by ex-army officers, some for a year, some for more than a year". On 23 November 2008, they set sail from Karachi unarmed to be picked up by a larger vessel. They hijacked the Indian fishing trawler Kuber and set sail for Mumbai.

The Times reported on 3 December 2008 that Indian police were going to submit Kasab to a narco analysis test to definitively determine his nationality.

According to DNA India, Kasab began reading the autobiography of India's independence leader Mahatma Gandhi in early March 2009, in response to coaxing by prison guards.

== Legal issues ==
Several Indian lawyers refused to represent Kasab citing ethical concerns. A resolution was passed unanimously by the Bombay Metropolitan Magistrate Court's Bar Association, which has more than 1,000 members, saying that none of its members would defend any of the accused of the terror attacks. Other bar associations passed similar resolutions. The Hindu nationalist political party Shiv Sena threatened lawyers against representing him. When one attorney, Ashok Sarogi, hinted that he would be willing to represent Kasab, Shiv Sena members protested outside his home and pelted it with stones, forcing him to retract. In December 2008, the Chief Justice of India K. G. Balakrishnan said that for a fair trial, Kasab needed a lawyer.

An eight-member commission from Pakistan, comprising defence lawyers, prosecutors and a court official was allowed to travel to India on 15 March to gather evidence for the prosecution of seven suspects linked to the 2008 Mumbai attacks. However, the defence lawyers were barred from cross-examining the four prosecution witnesses in the case including Ajmal Kasab.

Kasab wrote to the High Commission of Pakistan in India requesting help and legal aid. In the letter, he confirmed he and the nine killed militants were Pakistani. He asked the Pakistani High Commission to take custody of the body of fellow militant Ismail Khan. Pakistani officials confirmed the receipt of the letter and were reported to be studying it. No further updates were given.

On 1 April 2009, senior Indian advocate Anjali Waghmare agreed to represent Kasab, despite Shiv Sena activists having protested and stoned her home.

== Trial ==
His conviction was based on CCTV footage showing him striding across the Chhatrapati Shivaji Maharaj Terminus with an AK-47 and a backpack. Towards the end of December 2008, Ujjwal Nikam was appointed as public prosecutor for trying Kasab and in January 2009, M. L. Tahaliyani was appointed the judge for the case. Indian investigators filed an 11,000-page chargesheet against Kasab on 25 February 2009. Due to the fact that the chargesheet was written in Marathi and English, Kasab requested an Urdu translation of the charge sheet. He was charged with murder, conspiracy and waging war against India along with other crimes. His trial was originally scheduled to start on 15 April 2009 but was postponed as his lawyer, Anjali Waghmare was dismissed for a conflict of interest. It resumed on 17 April 2009 after Abbas Kazmi was assigned as his new defence counsel. On 20 April 2009, the prosecution submitted a list of charges against him, including the murder of 166 people. On 6 May 2009, Kasab pleaded not guilty to 86 charges. The same month he was identified by eyewitnesses who testified witnessing his actual arrival and him firing at the victims. Later the doctors who treated him also identified him. On 2 June 2009, Kasab told the judge he also understood the Marathi language.

In June 2009, the special court issued non-bailable warrants against 22 absconding accused including Jamaat-ud-Dawa, political wing of Lashkar-e-Taiba (JuD) chief Hafiz Saeed and chief of operations of Lashkar-e-Taiba, Zaki-ur-Rehman Laqvi. On 20 July 2009, Kasab retracted his non-guilty plea and pleaded guilty to all charges. On 18 December 2009, he retracted his guilty plea and claimed that he was framed and his confession was obtained by torture. Instead he claimed to have come to Mumbai 20 days before the attacks and was simply strolling at Juhu beach when police arrested him. The trial concluded on 31 March 2010 and on 3 May the verdict was pronounced – Kasab was found guilty of murder, conspiracy, and of waging war against India (which also carried the death penalty). On 6 May 2010, he was sentenced to death, and upon hearing this, Kasab broke down.

A Bombay High Court bench, composed of Justice Ranjana Desai and Justice Ranjit More, heard Kasab's appeal against the death penalty and upheld the sentence given by the trial court in their verdict on 21 February 2011. During the proceedings in the High Court, Justice Desai observed that Kasab had never shown any remorse after his arrest nor did he show signs of regret, besides displaying utter contempt during court proceedings on video conference, and that he was beyond scope of any rehabilitation. On 30 July 2011, Kasab moved to Supreme Court of India, challenging his conviction and sentence in the case. Thus, a bench composed of Justice Aftab Alam and Justice Chandramouli Kr. Prasad stayed the orders of the Bombay High Court so as to follow the due process of law, and started hearing the case.

On 29 August 2012, the Supreme Court of India upheld the death penalty for Kasab after finding him guilty. In its verdict, the court stated, "We are left with no option but to award death penalty. The primary and foremost offence committed by Kasab is waging war against the government of India".

== Execution ==
Kasab's plea for clemency was rejected by President Pranab Mukherjee on 5 November 2012. On 7 November, Minister of Home Affairs Sushilkumar Shinde confirmed the President's rejection of the petition. The following day, the State Government of Maharashtra was formally notified and requested to take action. The date of 21 November was then fixed for the execution, and the Indian government faxed their decision to the Pakistani Foreign Office.

Kasab was formally informed of his execution on 12 November, after which he requested government officials to inform his mother. On the night of 18–19 November, a senior prison official at Arthur Road Jail in Mumbai read Kasab's death warrant to him, informing him at the same time that his petition for clemency had been rejected. Kasab was then asked to sign his death warrant, which he did. He was secretly transferred under heavy guard to Yerwada Jail in Pune, on the Mumbai-Pune expressway arriving in the early morning of 19 November. The death and funeral of Shiv Sena chief Bal Thackeray also aided in diverting attention from Kasab. An officer at Arthur Road Jail stated anonymously: "Throughout the journey from Mumbai to Pune, he did not cause any trouble. Kasab's attitude was of resignation when he came to know that his mercy petition was rejected by the president. Kasab did not shed a single tear during the last few days."

Only the jail superintendent at Yerwada was made aware of Kasab's identity. Kasab was placed in a special cell when he was at Yerwada and no other inmates were informed of his presence. It was only a few minutes before Kasab's execution that the executioner was informed of the identity of the condemned.

The punishment to Kasab is a true tribute to the victims and martyrs of the 26/11 Mumbai terror attacks.

— Maharashtra Home Minister R. R. Patil

Though reportedly nervous in the final minutes before his execution, Kasab remained quiet and offered prayers, with his last words being "Allah Qasam maaf karna. Aisi ghalti dobara nahin hogi (I swear by Allah, please forgive me. I won't make such a mistake again)", and asked about his last wishes, Kasab said, "Gharwalon ko milna hai (I want to meet my family)". He was hanged on 21 November 2012 at 7:30 a.m. (local time), according to an announcement by Home Minister Shinde. Kasab's execution by the Maharashtra government happened barely two weeks after President Pranab Mukherjee rejected his mercy petition on 5 November, and 5 days before the 4th anniversary of the terror attack.

After the execution, the government contemplated burial at sea, similar to Osama Bin Laden after he was killed in May 2011 by US Navy SEALs and buried at sea, but the decision was finally made to bury Kasab at Yerwada Jail. Following his execution, Kasab's body was given to a maulvi for burial in accordance with Islamic rites. Ansar Burney, a human rights activist in Pakistan, later offered to help repatriate Kasab's body to Pakistan citing humanitarian reasons. The Indian government stated it would consider a formal application if offered. Shinde later stated that Kasab's body was buried in India because Pakistan had refused to claim it.

=== Reaction ===
Authorities in Uttar Pradesh banned all celebrations and public gatherings and placed the state on high alert in response. Similarly, the Coimbatore City Police took a group of people in Coimbatore into preventive custody for celebrating Kasab's execution. K. Unnikrishnan, father of Major Sandeep Unnikrishnan, said though the execution was necessary, it was not something to "rejoice over" and that the ensuing celebrations were "foolishness."

In Pakistan, the general and official government response was muted, with the media treating the execution as another news item, according to The Hindu. Tariq Fatemi, a retired senior Pakistani diplomat, commented that while many Pakistanis, including Government officials, were embarrassed by Kasab's actions and the attacks, some extremist groups would be angered by the hanging, especially after the appeals process had been exhausted, and were likely to mount public protests in the aftermath across Pakistan. While some journalists attempted to elicit statements from villagers in Kasab's village of Faridkot, they met with a hostile response. A senior LeT commander issued an anonymous statement, saying Kasab was a hero who would "inspire more fighters to follow his path." The Pakistani Taliban's spokesman Ehsanullah Ehsan issued a statement threatening Indians with retaliation and declaring Kasab would be avenged. Ehsan also made demands for Kasab's body to be returned to his family. "If they don't return his body to us or his family we will capture Indians and will not return their bodies." Kasab's aunt, Shahnaz Sughra, told a Reuters reporter over the phone, "This news is hell for us...Even if he did something wrong, we just want his body. Even if he did something wrong, I am proud that he taught the enemy a lesson in their own country."

While commending on the well appreciated role of two women officers in the smooth handling of the execution, Patil later responded to threats to avenge Kasab's death by stating that anybody daring to attack the soil of Maharashtra would meet the same fate.

== Kasab and Biryani ==
During the trial process, stories of Kasab being served ‘mutton biryani’ were in wide circulation. It had also become a political issue, with the then opposition party, BJP putting it up as an example of then UPA Government being soft on terror. These stories got wide circulation and credence.

Many years later, Ujjwal Nikam, the prosecutor claimed that Kasab's demand for mutton biryani in jail was just a myth and was "concocted" to stop an "emotional wave" which was being created in favour of the militant. As per Nikam- "Kasab never demanded Biryani and was never served by the government. I concocted it just to break an emotional atmosphere which was taking shape in favour of Kasab during the trial of the case".

This led to further controversy on the matter, with many persons condemning Nikam for his alleged falsity. Later IPS officer Meeran Borwankar also made similar claims in her memoirs Madam Commissioner: The Extraordinary Life of an Indian Police Chief, though the truth about the allegations still remain unclear.

== Media portrayals ==
In the 2013 film The Attacks of 26/11, Kasab was portrayed by Sanjeev Jaiswal, while he was portrayed by Rajan Verma in the 2010 action drama Ashok Chakra: Tribute to Real Heroes.

In ZEE5 web series State of Siege: 26/11 (2020), which recounts the attacks from the perspective of the NSG commandos, Kasab is portrayed by actor Shoaib Kabeer. In 2022 film Major, he was portrayed by K Vineet Chandra.

He is portrayed by Dalvinder Saini in the 2025 Indian spy thriller film Dhurandhar.

He is potrayed by Lalit Prabhakar in the 2026 Indian legal drama film Prahaar - The Ujjwal Nikam Story.

== See also ==
- David Headley
- Terrorism in India
- Capital punishment in India
