= Abhishek Mahendru =

Indian Actor

Abhishek Mahendru is an Indian actor known for his works exclusively in Hindi soap opera & cinema. His notable work includes Cirkus The Pushkar Lodge, Razia Sultan (TV series), State of Siege: 26/11 etc. His upcoming film is Sky Force featuring Akshay Kumar.
