= Gregory David Roberts =

Australian writer and bank robber (born 1952)

- Born: Gregory John Peter Smith; 1952 (age 73–74); Melbourne, Australia
- Occupations: Author; charity organiser; screenplay writer
- Writing career
- Period: Novelist from 2003–present
- Website: gregorydavidroberts.com

Gregory David Roberts (born Gregory John Peter Smith; 1952) is an Australian author best known for his novel Shantaram. He is a former heroin addict and convicted bank robber who escaped from Pentridge Prison in 1980 and fled to India, where he lived for ten years.

== Life ==
Roberts reportedly became addicted to heroin after his marriage ended and he lost custody of his young daughter. To finance his drug habit, he turned to crime, becoming known as the "Building Society Bandit" and the "Gentleman Bandit", because he only robbed institutions with adequate insurance. He wore a three-piece suit, and he always said "please" and "thank you" to the people he robbed.

At the time, Roberts believed that his manner lessened the brutality of his acts but, later in his life, he admitted that people only gave him money because he had made them afraid. He escaped from Pentridge Prison in 1980.

In 1990, Roberts was captured in Frankfurt, trying to smuggle himself into the country. He was extradited to Australia and served a further six years in prison, two of which were spent in solitary confinement. According to Roberts, he escaped prison again during that time but thought better of it and smuggled himself back into jail. His intention was to serve the rest of his sentence to give himself the chance to be reunited with his family. During his second stay in Australian prison, he began writing Shantaram. The manuscript was destroyed twice by prison staff while Roberts was writing it.

== Writing career ==
After leaving prison, Roberts was finally able to finish and publish his novel Shantaram. The book's title comes from the name his best friend's mother gave him, which means "Man of Peace", or "Man of God's Peace".

There is debate as to how much of Shantaram is based on true events or is a conflation of real life and fantasy. On that aspect of Shantaram and of the follow-up novel, The Mountain Shadow, Roberts has stated:

Some experiences from my life are described pretty much as they happened, and others are created narratives, informed by my experience. I wanted to write two or three novels on some bare elements from my life, allowing me to explore the themes that interested me, while keeping the narrative immediate by anchoring it to some of my real experiences. They're novels, not autobiographies, and all of the characters and dialogue is created. It doesn't matter how much of it is true or not to me, it's how true they are to all of us, and to our common humanity.

— Roberts interview

Roberts lived in Melbourne, Germany, and France and finally returned to Mumbai, where he set up charitable foundations to assist the city's poor with health care coverage. He was also reunited with his daughter. He got engaged to Françoise Sturdza, who is the president of the Heart for India Foundation. Roberts also wrote the original screenplay for the movie adaptation of Shantaram.

In 2009, Roberts was named a Zeitz Foundation Ambassador for Community. Ambassadors help raise awareness and shape activities in their areas. In 2011, Roberts stepped aside as an ambassador due to the pressure of other commitments but continues to assist the Zeitz Foundation as a Friend.

His second novel, The Mountain Shadow, was released on 13 October 2015 by Little Brown.

In 2022, Roberts published the nonfiction book The Spiritual Path.

== Music ==
In September 2020, Roberts released his debut single, "Drive All Night". This was followed by "Lisa Run Away". His debut album, Love and Faith, was recorded in Jamaica and released in December 2020.

== Bibliography ==
- Shantaram (2003)
- The Mountain Shadow (2015)
- The Spiritual Path (2022)
