= Faridkot, Khanewal =

Faridkot
- Location within Pakistan
- Coordinates: 30.16°N 71.57°E
- Country: Pakistan
- Province: Punjab
- Elevation: 129 m (423 ft)
- Time zone: UTC+5 (PST)

Faridkot is a small village in the Punjab province of Pakistan. It is located at 30°16'30N 71°57'30E with an altitude of 129 metres and lies to the south-west of the district capital - Khanewal.
