= Shantaram (novel) =

2003 novel by Gregory David Roberts

- First edition
- Author: Gregory David Roberts
- Language: English
- Publisher: Scribe Publications (Australia)
- Publication date: 2003
- Publication place: Australia
- Media type: Print (Hardback & Paperback)
- Pages: 936 (US hardback edition)
- ISBN: 1-920769-00-5 (First hardback edition)
- OCLC: 223420249
- Followed by: The Mountain Shadow (2015)

Shantaram is a 2003 novel by Australian author Gregory David Roberts, in which a convicted Australian bank robber and heroin addict escapes from Pentridge Prison and flees to India. The novel is commended by many for its vivid portrayal of life in Bombay in the 1980s.

The novel is reportedly influenced by real events in the life of the author, though some claims made by Roberts are contested by others involved in the story.

== Plot summary ==
In 1978, Roberts was sentenced to a 19-year imprisonment in Australia after being convicted of a series of armed robberies of building society branches, credit unions, and shops. In July 1980, he escaped from Victoria's Pentridge Prison in broad daylight, thereby becoming one of Australia's most wanted men for the next ten years.

The protagonist Lindsay (according to the book, Roberts' fake name) arrives in Bombay carrying a false passport in the name of Lindsay Ford. Mumbai was supposed to be only a stopover on a journey that was to take him from New Zealand to Germany, but he decides to stay on in the city. Lindsay soon meets a local man named Prabhakar whom he hires as a guide. Prabhakar soon becomes his friend and names him Lin (Lin baba). Both men visit Prabhakar's native village, Sunder, where Prabhakar's mother decided to give Lin a new Maharashtrian name, like her own. Because she judged his nature to be blessed with peaceful happiness, she decided to call him Shantaram, meaning Man of God's Peace. On their way back to Mumbai, Lin and Prabhakar are robbed. With all his possessions gone, Lin is forced to live in the slums, which shelters him from the authorities. After a massive fire on the day of his arrival in the slum, he sets up a free health clinic as a way to contribute to the community. He learns about the local culture and customs in this cramped environment, gets to know and love the people he encounters, and even becomes fluent in Marathi, the local language. He also witnesses and battles outbreaks of cholera and firestorms, becomes involved in trading with the lepers, and experiences how ethnic and marital conflicts are resolved in this densely crowded and diverse community.

The novel describes a number of foreigners of various origins, as well as local Indians, highlighting the rich diversity of life in Mumbai. Lin falls in love with Karla, a Swiss-American woman, befriends local artists and actors, landing him roles as an extra in several Bollywood movies, and is recruited by the Mumbai underworld for various criminal operations, including drug and weapons trade. Lin eventually lands in Mumbai's Arthur Road Prison. There, along with hundreds of other inmates, he endures brutal physical and mental abuse from the guards, while existing under extremely squalid conditions. However, thanks to the protection of the Afghan mafia don "Abdel Khader Khan", Lin is eventually released, and begins to work in a black market currency exchange and passport forgery. Having travelled as far as Africa on trips commissioned by the mafia, Lin later goes to Afghanistan to smuggle weapons for mujahideen freedom fighters. When his mentor Khan is killed, Lin realises he has become everything he grew to loathe and falls into depression after he returns to India. He decides that he must fight for what he believes is right, and build an honest life. The story ends with him planning to go to Sri Lanka, which lays the premise for the sequel to this book.

=== Fact-based elements ===
While parts of the novel, based on Roberts' known biography, such as Roberts' criminal history and escape from prison in Australia, are a matter of public record, and read as reportedly factual, numerous significant claims by Roberts remain harder (or impossible) to verify and are disputed by the family of one of the main Indian characters in the book.

There is a great deal of debate as to where the boundaries lie between fact and fiction in the book. Roberts has stated the characters in the story are largely invented, and that he merged different elements taken from true events and people into such events and characters like Prabhaker 'of the big smile'. Prabhakar Kisan Khare was a real-life individual, as are the members of Khare family from the book (Kisan, Rukhma, Kishor and Parvati Khare) whose names appear on government issued identity cards. The family resides in the Navy Nagar slum where the lead character Shantaram also lived. The Khare family disputes many of Roberts' claims, although they acknowledge close association with Gregory Roberts in the 1980s. Prabhakar died in an accident in 1988 in circumstances matching the event in the book.

In March 2006, the Mumbai Mirror reported they may have discovered the inspiration for the big smile of the character Prabhakar as belonging to a still living cab driver called Kishore, who took Roberts to his home village. Kishore Khare, brother of Prabhakar, who drives tourists around Mumbai, has told his story.

==== Roberts' position, based on his interviews ====
"With respect, Shantaram is not an autobiography, it's a novel. If the book reads like an autobiography, I take that as a very high compliment, because I structured the created narrative to read like fiction but feel like fact. I wanted the novel to have the page-turning drive of a work of fiction but to be informed by such a powerful stream of real experience that it had the authentic feel of fact."

"As with the novel Shantaram, the experiences in The Mountain Shadow are derived from my own real experiences, and the characters, dialogue, and narrative structure are all created."

Roberts repeatedly stated this, as on the book's official website:

All of the characters in the novel, Shantaram, are created. None of the characters bears even a remote resemblance to any real person I've ever known. Proceeding from the theme of exile, all of the characters represent one or another aspect of the exile experience. None of the characters – with the exception of Johnny Cigar, who is born to a vanished (exiled) father from somewhere beyond the city – is born in Bombay.

== Publication history ==
Originally, Shantaram was published by Scribe Publications as a hardcover and later as a paperback. Following the mediated resolution in 2004 of a dispute that arose in 2003 between Scribe and the book's author, Gregory David Roberts, rights to all forms of the local publication of Shantaram reverted to the author after Scribe sold its remaining stock of hardbacks. Pan Macmillan then took over publication under the Picador label.

== Reception ==
Megan O'Grady of The New York Times wrote "Few stand out quite like "Shantaram"", calling it a "gentle giant".

Carole Burns of The Washington Post described Gregory David Robert's "blatantly autobiographical" novel as sprawling and intelligent.

Emma Lee-Potter of The Independent listed it as one of the 12 best Indian novels, calling it a "page-turning debut".

Joe Regal, a literary agent, reviewed the book for Publishers Weekly stating that the novel was "a sensational read, it might well reproduce its bestselling success in Australia here."

Kirkus highly commended the author by pointing out that what the novel manages to achieve was "splendidly evoking an India few outsiders know."

== Sequels ==
Gregory Roberts has said that Shantaram is the first book in a planned quartet. A sequel entitled The Mountain Shadow was released on 13 October 2015 by Little Brown. It tells the story of Lin striving to survive in a Bombay now run by the new mafia.

== Proposed film adaptation ==
When the novel Shantaram was published in 2003, several parties, including actor Russell Crowe, expressed interest in a film adaptation. Although Crowe was temporarily attached to a bid, Warner Bros. went forward with a $2 million bid primarily due to actor Johnny Depp's expression of love for the book to studio executive Brad Grey. With the rights won, Depp was attached to star in the film, which was to be based on a script written by the book's author Gregory David Roberts. Roberts commended the casting choice, and the author said of his intended script, "The screenplay I am writing will be as complex and will have the same sense of layering and texturing. Thematically, it will reflect everything that is in the heart of the book and that is the exile experience, and the power of love to transform and change the heart of a person. But the book is a book and the film is a film—they are different art forms so the film will have an independent life." In October 2005, Warner Bros. hired screenwriter Eric Roth to rewrite the initial draft created by Roberts. The following November, director Peter Weir was hired by the studio to helm Shantaram and develop the script with Roth. The studio originally planned to schedule production for late 2006.

By June 2006, Weir departed from the project with a studio spokesperson citing different interpretations between the director and the studio and producers. In January 2007, director Mira Nair replaced Weir at the helm. The studio anticipated production would begin by autumn 2007 for a 2008 release. Roth began rewriting the script to lower project costs, and actor Amitabh Bachchan joined to star opposite Depp. By November 2007, the anticipated February production start was cancelled by Warner Bros, who cited the 2007–2008 Writers Guild of America strike's interference with the script's readiness, the impending monsoon season in India, and Depp's schedule difficulties in filming between India and New Mexico in the United States. The studio anticipated that production would finally begin in September 2008, but by November 2009, with production not starting, The Independent reported the project had been cancelled.

In May 2013, the Mumbai Mirror reported that Warner Bros. had negotiated to retain the film rights until 2015, fuelling speculation that a film adaptation of Shantaram was still in the works. In the following October, it was announced that Joel Edgerton would be starring in the leading role, with Eric Roth penning the adaptation and Johnny Depp now involved as a producer. Warner Bros. was in early talks with Garth Davis, co-director of the Emmy-nominated Top of the Lake, to make his feature film directing debut on the movie. An article from The Sydney Morning Herald published in April 2021 covered the development of all plans for screen adaptations of the book, saying that Warner Bros. had lost the film rights by 2015 and that a planned movie with Johnny Depp as one of its producers and Joel Edgerton as protagonist had been cancelled.

== TV adaptation ==
On 7 June 2018, it was announced that Apple Inc. was developing a television adaptation of the novel for Apple TV+ to be written by Eric Warren Singer who will also executive produce alongside David Manson, Nicole Clemens, Steve Golin, and Andrea Barron with Charlie Hunnam in the lead role. Production companies set to be involved with the potential series include Anonymous Content and Paramount Television. In August 2019, it was announced that production was moving forward with filming set to begin in October 2019. The series was filmed in Victoria, Australia, with scenes filmed at Docklands Studios Melbourne and HM Prison Pentridge. It was also announced that the series received 7.4 million Australian dollars in funding from the Australian Government. The series consists of 12 episodes with four episodes directed by Justin Kurzel. Steven Lightfoot has joined the show as showrunner. Shantaram premiered on Apple TV+ on 14 October 2022, starring Charlie Hunnam.
