= Faridkot, Okara =

Faridkot فرید کوٹ
- Location within Pakistan
- Coordinates: 30°41′26″N 73°41′40″E
- Country: Pakistan
- Province: Punjab
- Elevation: 167 m (548 ft)
- Time zone: UTC+5 (PST)

Faridkot (Urdu: فرید کوٹ) is a village in Depalpur Tehsil in the Okara District of the Punjab province of Pakistan.

== Notable people ==
- Ajmal Kasab, a perpetrator of the 2008 Mumbai attacks from Faridkot.
