= Dawood Ghaznavi =

British Indian Islamic Scholar (1895–1963)

1st Emir of Markazi Jamiat Ahle Hadith
- In office 24 July 1948 – 16 December 1963
- Preceded by: position established
- Succeeded by: Muhammad Ismail Salafi

Member of Punjab provincial Assembly
- In office 1946–1947

Member of Provincial Assembly of the Punjab
- In office 7 May 1951 – 14 October 1955

Mawlana, Shaykh Dawood Ghaznavi داؤد غزنوی

Personal life
- Born: 1895 Amritsar, British India
- Died: 1963 (aged 67–68) Lahore, Pakistan
- Resting place: Miani Sahib Graveyard, Lahore
- Main interest(s): Ilm al-Hadith, Aqeeda, Fiqh

Religious life
- Religion: Islam
- Denomination: Sunni
- Jurisprudence: Ghayr muqallid
- Movement: Ahl-i Hadith

Muhammad Daud Ghaznavi (better known as Dawood Ghaznavi or Daud Ghaznavi; 1895 – 16 December 1963), was an Islamic scholar, journalist, teacher, writer and politician in British India and a leader of the Indian independence movement. He served as the president of Punjab Provincial Congress Committee, and co-founded Majlis-e Ahrar-e Islam, the Jamiat Ulema-e-Hind and Markazi Jamiat Ahle Hadith. He was member of Punjab Provincial Assembly.

In 1946, as a politician of Indian national congress, Ghaznavi had participated in 1946 Punjab Provincial Assembly election and was member of Punjab Provincial Assembly from 1946 to 1947. After four years of service in Congress Party, he joined the Muslim League in August 1946. After Independence of Pakistan, he participated in 1951 Punjab provincial election and became a member of the Provincial Assembly of the Punjab.

== Early life ==
Dawood Ghaznavi was born in 1895 in Amritsar. He received Islamic education from his father Syed Abdul Jabbar Ghaznavi and his cousin Syed Abdul Awal Ghaznavi. He moved to Delhi for higher education, where he studied hadith under the tutelage of Abdullah Ghazipuri, who was one of the students of Syed Nazeer Husain.

Ghaznavi's full name is Dawood Ghaznavi ibn Abdul Jabbar Ghaznavi ibn Abdullah Ghaznavi ibn Muhammad ibn Muhammad Sharif Ghaznavi.

== Career ==
Ghaznavi started his political career by joining the congress party in 1942 and participated in Quit India Movement. He actively participated in the Indian independence movement. Ghaznavi was elected the president of Punjab Provincial Congress Committee in 1946. He was jailed for 3 years for participating in a campaign against the British and was released in 1924. Ghaznavi was one of the co-founders of the Jamiat Ulema-e-Hind and Majlis-e Ahrar-e Islam. In 1946, being the politician of Indian national congress, he participated in assembly elections and became a member of the Punjab Provincial Assembly. Due to indifferences with Congress party, he joined the Muslim League on 2nd August 1946.

After Independence of Pakistan, as a member of Muslim League, he participated in 1951 Punjab provincial election and became a member of the Provincial Assembly of the Punjab.

The Markazi Jamiat Ahle Hadith Maghribi Pakistan was founded in a historic meeting on 24 July 1948 at the Darul Uloom Taqwiyatul Islam in Lahore by a number of Salafi Islamic scholars, including Ibrahim Mir, Abdullah Ropari, Muhammad Ishaq Bhatti, Dawood Ghaznavi and others. Ghaznavi was elected as the first emir of the Markazi Jamiat Ahle Hadith. He served emir from 1948 until his death in 1963.

Ghaznavi died on 16 December 1963, and was buried in the Miani Sahib Graveyard in Lahore, Pakistan.

== Works ==
Dawood Ghaznavi has written more than 20 books including;

- Eid-e-Meelad
- Qurbani ki rooh
- Uswa-e-Hussain
- Islami riasat ke asasi usool-w-tasawrat
- Masla-e-touheed
