= List of Quran interpreters =

Notable tafsir (Quran interpreters) include:

== A ==
- Abd al-Qahir al-Jurjani
- Abd al-Rahman al-Tha'alibi
- Abdelhamid Ben Badis
- Abdul Aziz al-Harbi
- Abdul Hakim Sialkoti
- Abdul Karim Mudarris
- Abdul Majid Daryabadi
- Abdul Mannan Wazirabadi
- Abdullah Yusuf Ali
- Abdurrahman Shihab
- Abu Abd al-Rahman Ibn Aqil al-Zahiri
- Abu al-Barakat al-Nasafi
- Abu al-Futuh al-Razi
- Abu al-Layth al-Samarqandi
- Abu Bakr ibn al-Arabi
- Abu Hanifa
- Abu Hayyan al-Gharnati
- Abu Ishaq al-Tha'labi
- Abu Jaʿfar an-Nahhas
- Abu Mansur al-Maturidi
- Abu Ubaid al-Qasim bin Salam
- Abul A'la Maududi
- Ahmad ibn Ajiba
- Aisha Abd al-Rahman
- Akmal al-Din al-Babarti
- Al-Ash'ari
- Al-Baghawi
- Al-Bazdawi
- Al-Farraʼ
- Al-Jarmi
- Al-Khatib al-Shirbini
- Al-Mahalli
- Al-Mubarrad
- Al-Qassab
- Al-Qurtubi
- Al-Raghib al-Isfahani
- Al-Sakhawi
- Al-Shawkani
- Al-Suyuti
- Al-Tabari
- Al-Zamakhshari
- 'Ala' al-Din al-Bukhari
- Amin Ahsan Islahi
- Ashraf Ali Thanwi

== B ==
- Bouguerra Soltani

== E ==
- Ebussuud Efendi

== F ==
- Fairuzabadi
- Fakhr al-Din al-Razi
- Fethullah Gülen

== G ==
- Gabriel Said Reynolds

== H ==
- Hamiduddin Farahi
- Hartwig Hirschfeld
- Hassan al-Banna

== I ==
- Ibn Abbas
- Ibn Abidin
- Ibn al-Jawzi
- Ibn al-Mundhir
- Ibn Barrajan
- Ibn Duraid
- Ibn Furak
- Ibn Juzayy
- Ibn Khalawayh
- Ibn Kathir
- Ibn Wahb
- Ibn 'Atiyya
- Ishaq ibn Rahwayh
- Ismail Haqqi Bursevi
- Israr Ahmed

== J ==
- Jalal al-Din Davani
- Jana Begum
- Javed Ahmad Ghamidi

== K ==
- Karam Shah al-Azhari
- Khalil (scholar)
- Kirmani

== M ==
- Mahmud al-Alusi
- Mahmud Hasan Deobandi
- Mohammad Amin Sheikho
- Muhammad Abdullah Draz
- Muhammad Abu Zahra
- Muhammad al-Tahir ibn Ashur
- Muhammad Ali al-Sabuni
- Muhammad Amjad
- Muhammed Hamdi Yazır
- Muhammad Hashim Thattvi
- Muhammad Husayn Tabatabai
- Muhammad Ibn Ibrahim Ibn Jafar al-Numani
- Muhammad Ibrahim Mir Sialkoti
- Muhammad Madni Ashraf Ashrafi Al-Jilani
- Muhammad Metwalli al-Sha'rawi
- Muhammad Quraish Shihab
- Muhammad Shafi
- Muhammad Sulaiman Salman Mansoorpuri
- Mujahid ibn Jabr
- Muqatil ibn Sulayman
- Murtada Sharif 'Askari

== N ==
- Naeem-ud-Deen Muradabadi
- Nizam al-Din al-Nisapuri
- Nurettin Uzunoğlu

== O ==
- Omar Farouk

== Q ==
- Qadi Baydawi

== R ==
- Rashad Khalifa
- Rashid Rida
- Reuven Firestone

== S ==
- Saʽid Ḥawwa
- Sa'id ibn Mansur
- Sadr al-Shari'a al-Asghar
- Said Nursî
- Sanaullah Amritsari
- Sanaullah Panipati
- Sayyid Qutb
- Shabbir Ahmad Usmani
- Shah Ahmad Noorani
- Shams al-Din al-Fanari
- Shihab al-Din al-Khafaji
- Sidi Boushaki
- Sufyan al-Thawri

== T ==
- Taqi Usmani
- Taqi al-Din al-Subki

== U ==
- Ubadah ibn al-Samit

== W ==
- Wahbah al-Zuhayli

== Y ==
- Yousef Casewit

== See also ==
- List of tafsir works
- Ulama
