= Ibtisam Elahi Zaheer =

Pakistani Islamic scholar (born 1972)

Doctor Allamah Ibtisam Elahi Zaheer
- ابتسام الٰہی ظہیر

Personal life
- Born: 12 January 1972 (age 54) Lahore, Punjab, Pakistan
- Parent: Ehsan Elahi Zaheer (father)
- Political party: Jamiat Ahle Hadith (2018-present)
- Education: Islamic University of Madinah; UET Lahore; GCU

Religious life
- Religion: Islam
- Denomination: Sunni
- Jurisprudence: Ghayr muqallid
- Movement: Salafism/ Ahl-i Hadith

Muslim leader
- Residence: Lahore

Ibtisam Elahi Zaheer (Note: Urdu: ابتسام الہی ظہیر, romanized: Ibtisām Elāhī Ẓahēēr) (born 12 January 1972) is a Pakistani Islamic scholar. A member of the Markazi Jamiat Ahle Hadith and is known for his inter-Islamic activities, promoting unity between the Madhhabs within Islam.

He is the eldest son of Ehsan Elahi Zaheer.

== Early life ==
Ibtisam Elahi Zaheer was born 12 January 1972 in Lahore, Punjab, Pakistan. His father, Ehsan Elahi, was a renowned Islamic scholar who belonged to the Sethi clan. He has two other well-known brothers, Hisham and Mutasim.

Zaheer studied from the Crescent Model School and passed his matriculation from there. After that, he joined Government College Lahore and passed the pre-engineering college examination from there.

He then enrolled at the University of Engineering and Technology, Lahore. While there, he also memorized the Quran.

== Career ==
After the assassination of his father Ehsan Elahi Zaheer, he led his own faction of the Markazi Jamiat Ahle Hadith against the mainstream group led by Sajid Mir. However, in 2018, he merged his faction into Sajid Mir's faction.

In 2003, He was banned from entering the city of Faisalabad during the Muharram procession of Shias. Zaheer was a part of the Muttahida Majlis-e-Amal (MMA).

In 2012, He campaigned against NATO's resumption of strikes in Pakistan under the umbrella of Difa-e-Pakistan Council. and under Hafiz Saeed's Jamaat-ud-Dawa, He participated in pro-Palestinian rallies amidst the 2014 Gaza war.

In 2020, He was part of the clergy that pushed for Tahaffuz Bunyad-e-Islam bill to be implemented.

He contested the 2024 general election on the NA-132 constituency of Kasur, ultimately losing to Shehbaz Sharif.

In 2024, after Zaheer toured the United Kingdom, four mosques were assessed by Charity Foundation for association with an "Islamic extremist" cleric.
