= Fazal Ilahi (disambiguation) =

Fazal Ilahi or Fazal Elahi (Urdu: فضل الٰہی) is a male given name. Notable people with the name include:

- Fazal Ilahi Wazirabadi (1882–1951), Pakistani Islamic scholar and freedom fighter
- Fazal Ilahi (died 1948), Pakistani politician
- Fazal Ilahi Chaudhry (1904–1982), fifth President of Pakistan
- Fazal Elahi, Pakistani politician
