= Muhammad Sulaiman Salman Mansoorpuri =

Islamic Scholar

Qazi Muhammad Sulaiman Salman Mansoorpuri
- قاضی محمد سلیمان سلمان منصورپوری

Personal life
- Born: محمد سلیمان سلمان; 1867 Mansurpur, Patiala State, India
- Died: 30 May 1930 (aged 62–63) Jeddah, Hejaz and Nejd
- Cause of death: Natural death
- Home town: Mansurpur
- Parent: Qazi Ahmad Shah (father)
- Notable work: Rahmatul-lil-Alameen
- Education: Munshi Fazil
- Occupation: Writer, Islamic Scholar

Religious life
- Religion: Islam

Qazi Muhammad Sulaiman Salman Mansurpuri also referred to as Qazi Muhammad Sulaiman Salman or Qazi Muhammad Suleman Mansoorpuri (Urdu: قاضی محمد سلیمان سلمان منصورپوری; Born: 1867 AD, Mansurpur, Patiala State – 30 May 1930, Jeddah, Saudi Arabia AD, 1284 AH - 02 Muharram 1349 AH) was an Islamic scholar, biographer and historian. Sulaiman Mansoorpuri is best known for Rahmatul-lil-Alameen (Mercy for Mankind), the biography of the Islamic prophet Muhammad in three volumes. He was also session judge in Patiala State.

== Early life and education ==
Sulaiman Mansoorpuri was born in 1867 in Mansurpur (formerly state Patiala, a princely state of the British Empire in India). He received his early education from his father Qazi Ahmad Shah. Sulaiman Mansoorpuri's father was a Deputy Tahsildar in Patiala State.

At the age of seventeen, Sulaiman Mansoorpuri completed Munshi Fazil from Government Mohindra College, Patiala and came first in the University of the Punjab examination. After completing his education, Sulaiman Mansoorpuri then joined the Department of Education, Finance and Civil Affairs in the state of Patiala. Developing his skills and abilities, he became a Sessions Judge in 1924.

=== Lineage ===
Muhammad Sulaiman bin Qazi Ahmad Shah bin Qazi Baqii Ballah bin Qazi Moizuddin Ahmad.

Qazi Peer Muhammad, ancestor of Muhammad Sulaiman, was a judge in Mughal Empire that's why most of member of this family were known as Qazi.

== Death ==
In 1930, Salman Mansoorpuri travelled to Jeddah, Saudi Arabia with Ghulam Rasool Mahr to perform Hajj. He died on 30 May 1930 while returning from Hajj.

== Works ==
Mansoorpuri has written books in Urdu and Arabic. His books include:

- Sabeel Al-irshaad
- Tayed al-Islam
- Ashabe Badr
- Tareekh-ul-Mashaheer

=== Rahmatul-lil-Alameen (Mercy for Mankind) ===
This is the popular book of Sulaiman. This is the biography of the Islamic prophet Muhammad in three volumes. First published in 1911, this book has been translated in various languages, including English.

=== Al-Jamal Wa Al-Kamal ===
This book is the complete exegesis of Surah Yusuf.

== See also ==
- Abdullah Ropari
- Sanaullah Amritsari
- Abdul Mannan Wazirabadi
- Muhammad Ibrahim Mir Sialkoti

== Bibliography ==
- Bhaṭṭī, Muḥammad Isḥāq (2007). Qazi Muhammad Sulaiman Mansoorpuri (in Urdu). Lahore: Al-Maktaba Al-Salafiyah, Sheesh Mahal, Lahore.
- Iraqi, Abdul Rasheed (2001). 40 Ahl-e Hadith Scholars from the Indian Subcontinent. Independently Published. ISBN 9781081008956.
- Urdu Daerah Maaraf - e - Islamia (Urdu Encyclopedia of Islam) (in Urdu). Lahore: University of the Punjab. 2001. pp. 435–436 Volume 19.
