= Abdul Jabbar Ghaznavi =

Afghan Islamic scholar (1852–1913)

Mawlana Abdul Jabbar Ghaznavi عبد الجبار غزنوی

Personal life
- Born: 1852 Ghazni, Afghanistan
- Died: 28 August 1913 Amritsar, British India
- Children: Dawood Ghaznavi
- Parent: Abdullah Ghaznavi (father)
- Main interest(s): Ilm al-Hadith, Aqeeda

Religious life
- Religion: Islam
- Denomination: Sunni
- Jurisprudence: Ghayr muqallid
- Creed: Athari
- Movement: Ahl-i Hadith (Salafism)

Abdul Jabbar Ghaznavi (c. 1852 – 28 August 1913) was an Afghan Islamic scholar. A leading figure of the Ahl-i Hadith movement, he was the son of Abdullah Ghaznavi and the father of Dawood Ghaznavi.

== Biography ==
Abdul Jabbar Ghaznavi was born in c. 1852 (1268 AH) in Ghazni, Afghanistan. He received Islamic education from his father Abdullah Ghaznavi and brothers Muhammad Ghaznavi and Ahmad Ghaznavi. Abdul Jabbar was reportedly the eldest out of all his brothers.

Abdul Jabbar later enrolled in hadith studies under renowned Salafi scholar Sayyid Nadhir Husayn Dihlawi. Abdul Jabbar taught at his father's seminary, Madrasa Ghaznaviyya, in Amritsar. After his father's death, his brother Abdullah bin Abdullah Ghaznavi briefly succeeded his father as caliph, and upon his death, Abdul Jabbar succeeded him. Abdul Jabbar was a staunch critic of the Ahmadi Qadiyanis and their leader Mirza Ghulam Ahmad.

In 1902 (1319 AH), Abdul Jabbar founded Darul Uloom Taqwiyatul Islam in Amritsar. The seminary became highly influential in Ahl-i Hadith circles in Punjab. Abdul Jabbar died in Amritsar, British India, in 28 August 1913 (25 Ramadan 1331 AH). After the partition of India in 1947, the seminary shifted to Lahore.

== Legacy and works ==
Abdul Jabbar Ghaznavi remains honored in Muslim circles. The Islamic scholar Abdul Hai Hasani of the Deobandi movement mentioned him as a "great scholar of hadith" and who was "very intelligent". Another prominent Deobandi, Abul Hasan Ali Nadwi, regarded Abdul Jabbar as one of the "righteous and faithful followers of the Sunnah".

Abdul Jabbar Ghaznavi's works include:

- Sawanih Umri
- Sabil al-Najat Fi Mubayanat al-Rabb An al-Makhluqat
- Al-Arba'in Fi Anna Thana Allah Laysa Ala Madhab al-Muhaddithin
- Fatawa al-Ghaznawiyya
