= Abdullah Ropari =

Islamic Scholar

- حافظ عبد اللہ روپڑی

Personal life
- Born: Abdullah; 1895 Amritsar, Punjab, British India (present-day Punjab, India)
- Died: 20 August 1964 (aged 68–69) Lahore, Punjab, Pakistan
- Cause of death: Natural death
- Citizenship: British India, Pakistan
- Other name: Hafiz Abdullah Muhaddis Ropri
- Occupation: Islamic scholar, historian, mufti

Religious life
- Religion: Islam
- Movement: Pakistan movement Jamiat Ahle Hadith; All India Ahle Hadees Conference

Abdullah Ropri or Abdullah Muhaddis Ropri or Hafiz Abdullah Ropri, (Punjabi: عبد اللہ روپڑی; Abdullah Ropri, 1895 AD – 20 August 1964 AD, 1303 AH – 11 Rabiʽ al-Thani 1384 AH) was an Islamic scholar, historian, mufti, commentator and muhaddith of Indian Subcontinent.

He was a scholar of Hadith. Ropri was an Indian freedom fighter but after the creation of All-India Muslim League, he became an activist of Tehreek-e-Pakistan, as the Pakistan movement was known as in regional parlance. He was one of the notable leaders of Ahl-i Hadees and one of the founders of Jamiat Ahle Hadith.

== Early life and education ==
Abdullah Ropari was born in 1895 in a town of Amritsar district of British India. His father name was Miyan Roshan Deen. His ancestors were originally from Aminpur village in Gujranwala District. During the reign of Maharaja of Punjab, Ranjit Singh, some members of his family got lands in Amritsar district of British India and moved there. Abdullah was born here. Abdullah Ropari received his religious education from Molvi Abdullah, who was famous Islamic scholar of the town, in Chunian city where he memorised Quran. He went to Meerut and Delhi for further religious education. He received his hadith degree from Abdul Mannan Wazirabadi.

In 1915, after completing the education, Ropari moved to Ambala, Haryana, and stayed there till 1937. Ropari open a religious school (Madrasa), Darul Hadees and started career as teacher.

== After partition ==
In 1947, Abdullah Ropari moved to Lahore from Amritsar after the partition of India, where he opened a religious school named, Madarsa Ahle hadees and a mosque named, Jama al-Quds Ahle hadees.

== Death ==
Abdullah Ropari died on 20 August 1964 AD, 11 Rabiʽ al-Thani 1384 AH in Lahore, Pakistan. His funeral prayers were led by Muhammad Gondalwi and he was buried in the cemetery of Garden Town, Lahore.

== Works ==
Abdullah Ropari has written books in Urdu and Arabic. His books include:

- Tafseer Al Quran Al Kareem
- Ladki Shadi Kyon Karti Hai

=== Al-Kitab Al-Mastatab ===
Al-Kitab Al-Mastatab Fi Jawab Fasal Al-Khitab, In this book Abdullah Ropari commented on Anwar Shah Kashmiri's Fasal Al-Khitab.

=== Fatwa Ahle Hadees ===
It's the book of fatwa of Abdullah. This book is most popular among Ahle Hadees.

== See also ==
- Abdul Mannan Wazirabadi
- Muhammad Ibrahim Mir Sialkoti
- Sanaullah Amritsari
- Muhammad Sulaiman Salman Mansoorpuri

== Bibliography ==
- Bhatti, Muhammad Ishaq (2011). روپڑی علمائے حدیث [Rupari scholars of Hadith] (in Urdu). Lahore: Mohaddis Ropari Academy.
- Iraqi, Abdul Rasheed (2000). تذکرہ محدث روپڑی [Mention of Muhaddith Rupari] (in Urdu). Lahore: Muhaddis Ropri Academy.
- Iraqi, Abdul Rasheed (2019). "Hafiz Abdullah Ropari". 40 Ahl-e Hadith Scholars from the Indian Subcontinent. Independently Published. pp. 294–302. ISBN 978-1-0810-0895-6.
- Mahmood, Qasim (1998). Shahkar Islami Encyclopedia [Masterpiece Islamic Encyclopedia] (in Urdu). Lahore, Pakistan: Al-Faisal Nashiran-o-Tajiran Kutub. pp. 1124–1125.
- Mohammadi, Mohammad Ameen (2019). تحریک پاکستان میں علماء اہلحدیث کا کردار [The role of scholars of Ahl-i Hadith in the Pakistan Movement] (in Urdu). Urdu Bazar, Lahore: Dar al-Muslimeen. pp. 499–502.
- Nagi, Shahid Farooq (2012). تذکرہ حافظ محمد گوندلوی [Mention of Hafiz Muhammad Gondalvi] (in Urdu). Lahore: Maktab Qudsiyya.
- Madni, Hafiza Maryam (2002). محدث روپڑی اور تفسیری درایت کے اصول [Hadith Scholar Ropari and the principles of exegetical wisdom (MPhil thesis)] (in Urdu). Lahore: Shaykh Zaid Islamic Center, University of the Punjab.
- Ropari, Abdullah (1973). Fataawa Ahl E Hadees. Vol. 1. Sargodha.
