= Markazi Jamiat Ahle Hadith =

Pakistani religious organization and political party

Markazi Jamiat Ahle Hadith مرکزی جمیعت اہلِ حدیث
- Abbreviation: MJAH
- Leader: Hafiz Abdul Kareem
- Founder: Dawood Ghaznavi; Ibrahim Mir; Abdullah Ropari; Muhammad Ishaq Bhatti; Ihsan Ilahi Zahir
- Founded: 1948; 78 years ago
- Headquarters: Lahore, Punjab, Pakistan
- Student wing: Jamiat Talaba Ahle Hadith Pakistan
- Youth wing: Ahle Hadith Youth Force Pakistan
- Ideology: Islamism; Salafism (Ahl-i Hadith); Islamic conservatism Federalism
- Political position: Right-wing
- Religion: Sunni Islam (Salafi)
- National affiliation: PDM; MMA
- Regional affiliation: Markazi Jamiat Ahle Hadith Azad Kashmir
- Continental affiliation: Jamiat e Ahlihadith Jammu And Kashmir; Jamiat Ahle Hadith Hind; Jamiat Ahle Hadith Bangladesh; Markazi Jamiat Ahl-e-Hadith UK
- Colors: Green, White
- Senate: 1 / 100
- National Assembly: 1 / 336

Election symbol
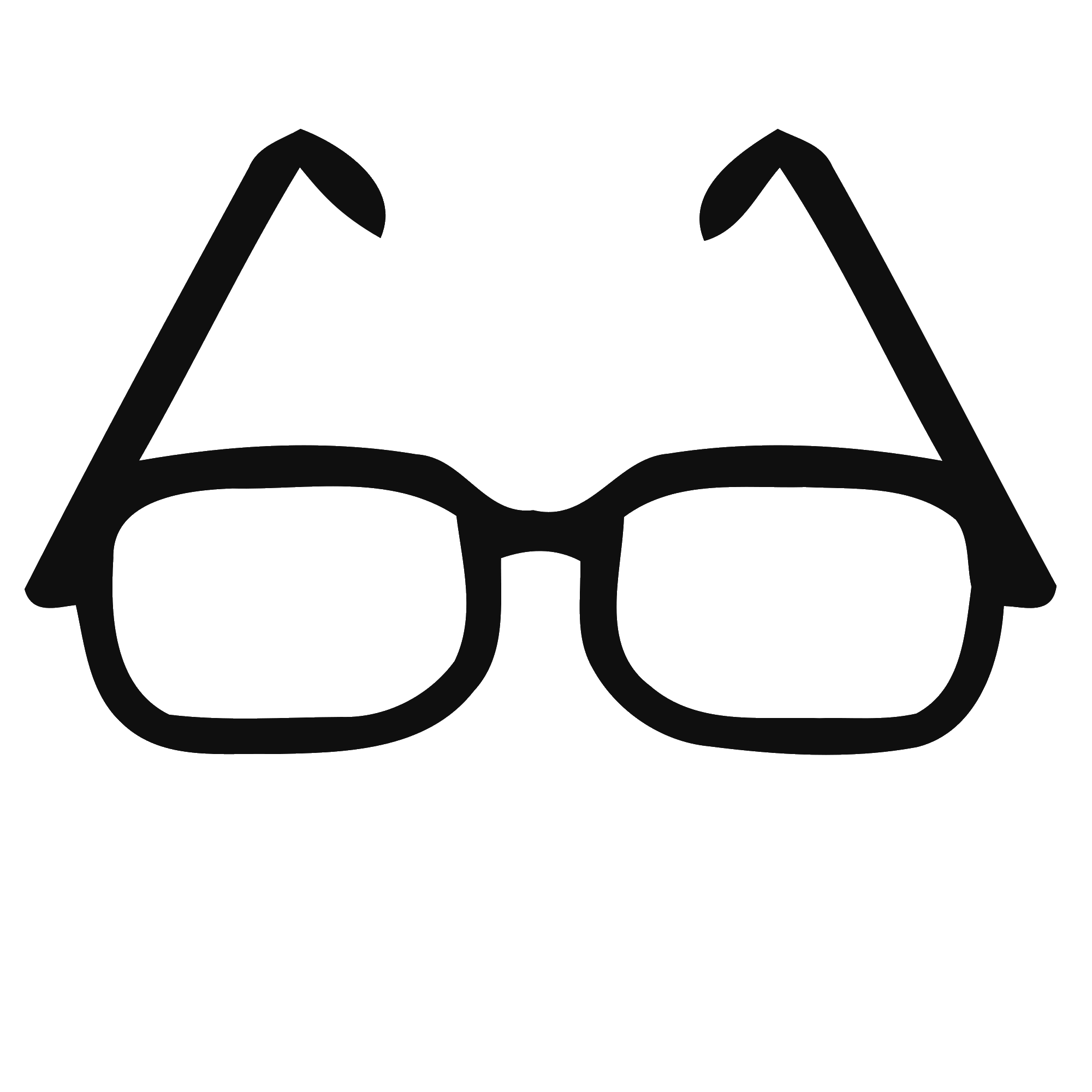
- Spectacles

Party flag

Website
- www.ahlehadith.pk

Markazi Jamiat Ahle Hadith (Note: Urdu: مرکزی جمیعت اہلِ حدیث) (MJAH) is an Islamic religious organization and political party in Pakistan, Although a Islamist missionary political party the MJAH derives itself from the Ahl-e-Hadith a Salafi reform movement. It was founded in 1948 by Salafi Islamic scholars in Lahore.

Although Markazi Jamiat Ahle Hadith (MJAH) is one of the country's largest Salafi religious organization and political party but it has spliter faction internally called Jamiat Ahle Hadith Pakistan (JAHP) led by Zahir's son Hisham Ilahi Zahir.

The Markazi Jamiat Ahle Hadith (MJAH) supported Pakistan Muslim League (N) (PML-N) in the 2013 Pakistani general elections, 2018 Pakistani general election and its the first religio-political organization which is openly supported by Nawaz Sharif and his party the both parties maintain close political alliance in Pakistan's national politics. The MJAH always has made noteworthy diplomatic efforts that strengthened the bilateral ties between Pakistan and Saudi Arabia.

== History ==
The Markazi Jamiat Ahle Hadith Maghribi Pakistan was founded in a historic meeting on 24 July 1948 at the Darul Uloom Taqwiyatul Islam in Lahore by a number of Salafi Islamic scholars, including Ibrahim Mir, Abdullah Ropari, Muhammad Ishaq Bhatti, Dawud Ghaznawi and others. Dawud Ghaznawi was elected as the first president of the Markazi Jamiat Ahle Hadith. After the death of Dawud Ghaznawi in 1963, Muhammad Isma'il Salafi was appointed the president of the organization and served in the position until his own death in 1968.

The religious organization was launched as a political party in 1986 by Ihsan Ilahi Zahir. A year later, in 1987, Zahir was killed. After his death, the organization split into two factions, the main one being led by Sajid Mir, and the other one named Jamiat Ahle Hadith Pakistan (JAHP) by Zahir's son Ibtisam Ilahi Zahir. Later on, in 2018, Ibtisam merged his faction into Sajid Mir's MJAH and reunited the organization.

However, in 2023, another of Ihsan's son, Hisham Ilahi Zahir, was expelled from the MJAH and he re-started the JAHP as president.

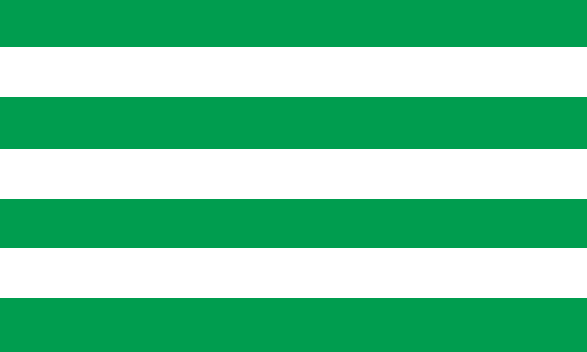
Flag of formerly led Ibtisam Ilahi Zahir's Jamiat Ahle Hadith Pakistan (Elahi Zaheer) faction

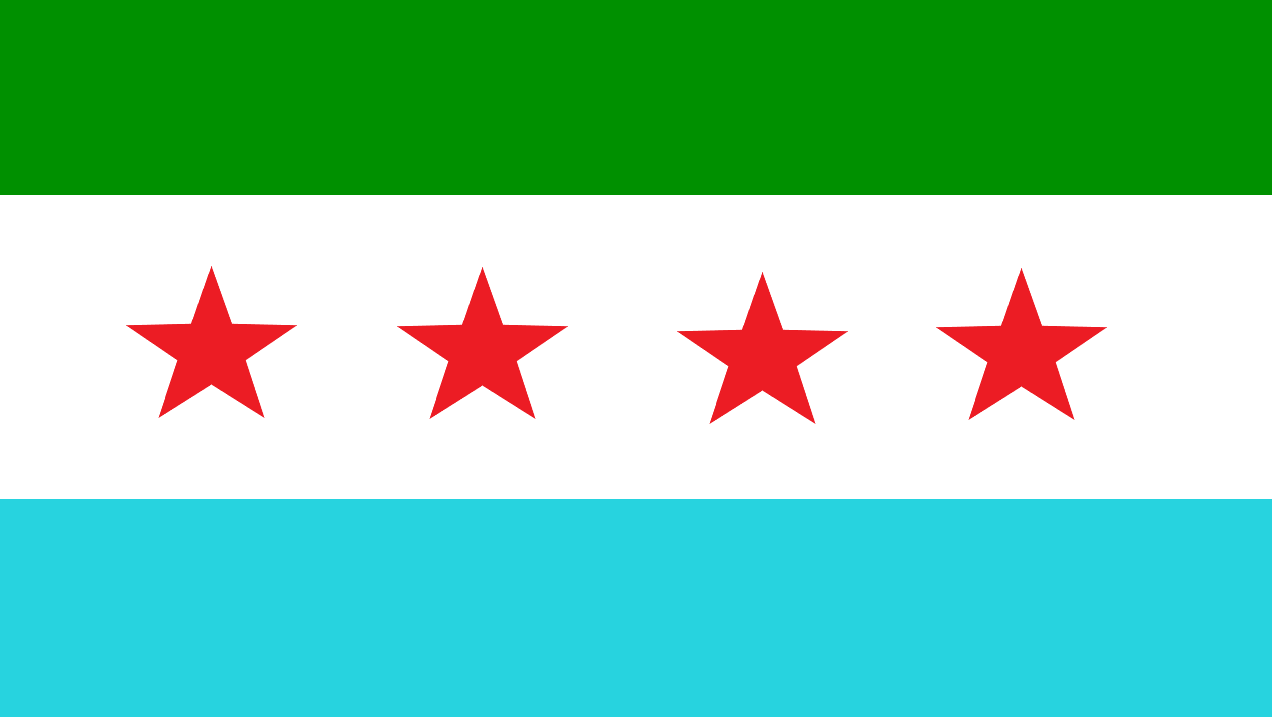
Jamiat Ahle Hadith's Youth wing flag

== Leaders ==
List of leaders of Markazi Jamiat Ahle Hadith
Order	Presidents	Year
1	Dawud Ghaznawi	1948–1963
2	Muhammad Isma'il Salafi	1963–1968
	Sajid Mir	1992–2025
	Hafiz Abdul Kareem	2025–present
