= Abdul Mannan Wazirabadi =

Islamic Scholar

- عبدالمنان وزیر آبادی

Personal life
- Born: Abdul Mannan; 1851 Wazirabad
- Died: 18 July 1916 (aged 64–65) Wazirabad
- Cause of death: Natural death
- Citizenship: British Indians
- Other name: Ustad-e-Punjab

Religious life
- Religion: Islam
- Denomination: Sunni
- Jurisprudence: Ghayr muqallid
- Creed: Athari
- Movement: Ahl-i Hadith

Muslim leader
- Students: Fazal Ilahi Wazirabadi

Hafiz Abdul Mannan Wazirabadi, spelled as Abdul Mannan Wazirabadi or Abdul Manan Wazirabadi (Urdu: عبدالمنان وزیر آبادی; Abdul Mannan Wazirabadi, 1851 AD – 18 July 1916 AD, 1267 AH – 16 Ramzan 1334 AH) was a religious scholar, jurist, mufassir and muhaddith during British Raj. He was a well known scholar of hadith of his time, a notable leader of the Ahl-i Hadees movement, and was also known as Muhaddith-e-Punjab or Ustad-e-Punjab.

== Early life and education ==
Mannan Wazirabadi was born in 1267 AH, 1851 AD in the village of Karoili in Punjab's Jhelum district. When he was 8 years old, he contracted conjunctivitis and lost his sight due to this disease. His father, Mulk Sharfuddin bin Noor Khan, was a member of the Awan tribe, a tribe living predominantly in northern, central, and western parts of Punjab. His family was originally from Ghazni and had migrated to Punjab and started working in the field of agricultural. His father died when Mannan was twelve years old.

Hafiz Wazirabadi started receiving the Quran and Persian at home from the Maulvi of his village. He went to different places for higher education and finally came to the service of Syed Nazir Hussain Dehlavi in Delhi. Under Syed Nazir, Wazirabadi completed science of hadith and Quranic commentary. During his stay in Delhi, he also met the founder of Darul Uloom Deoband, Muhammad Qasim Nanautavi and other eminent scholars. After completing the tour of hadith, he came to Abdullah Ghaznavi in Amritsar. Ghaznavi seated Mannan Wazirabadi on the pedestal of Hadith. After staying for some time, he came back to Wazirabad. Where he live forever.

== Death ==
Mannan Wazirabadi died in Wazirabad on 16 Ramadan 1334 AH, 18 July 1916 AD. He is buried in Chowrangi Cemetery near Wazirabad Sialkot Road. On his death, Sanaullah Amritsar had said that today's Imam Bukhari has died.

== See also ==
- Abdullah Ropari
- Muhammad Ibrahim Mir Sialkoti
- Muhammad Sulaiman Salman Mansoorpuri

== Notes ==
=== Work cited ===
- Salafi, Munir Ahmad (1994). Hafiz Abdul Mannan Wazirabadi; Hayat, Khidmat, Asaar [Abdul Mannan Wazirabadi; Life, Contribution, Influence] (in Urdu). Lahore: Faran Academy, Lahore.
- Mahmood, Qasim (1998). Shahkar Islami Encyclopedia [Masterpiece Islamic Encyclopedia] (in Urdu). Lahore, Pakistan: Al-Faisal Nashiran-o-Tajiran Kutub. pp. 1129–1130.
- Sohdravi, Abdul Majeed (2002). Ustad Punjab [Teacher of Punjab] (in Urdu). Lahore: Muslim Publication.
