= Abdul Rehman Makki =

Second-in-command of Lashkar-e-Taiba

Personal details
- Born: 1948 or 10 December 1954 Bahawalpur, West Punjab, Pakistan
- Died: 27 December 2024 (aged between 70 and 76) Lahore, Punjab, Pakistan
- Resting place: Muridke, Punjab, Pakistan
- Party: Jamaat-ud-Dawah
- Spouse: None
- Relations: Hafiz Muhammad Saeed (cousin and brother-in-law)
- Children: Owaid Rehman Makki †
- Parent: Hafiz Abdullah Bahawalpuri (father)
- Religion: Islam
- Denomination: Sunni
- Movement: Ahl-e-Hadith
- Nationality: Pakistani

Military service
- Allegiance: Lashkar-e-Taiba
- Rank: Second-in-command of Jamaat-ud-Dawah and Naib Ameer of Lashkar-e-Taiba

Abdul Rehman Makki (Note: Makki being a nisba for someone from Mecca; he studied and taught at the Umm al-Qura University in Mecca, Saudi Arabia.) (Urdu: عبد الرحمن مکی; 1948 or 10 December 1954 – 27 December 2024) was a Pakistani radical Islamist and the second-in-command and the political and foreign affairs head of the Jamaat-ud-Dawah (JuD), the front organisation of the militant group Lashkar-e-Taiba (LeT) where he served as the Naib Ameer.

== Early life ==
His father Hafiz Abdullah Bahawalpuri was a Ahl-i Hadith preacher, an alumnus of Aligarh Muslim University and University of the Punjab he migrated to Bahawalpur, Pakistan with his family during the partition of India. Abdullah was a student leader of the All-India Muslim League and was associated with Muhammad Ali Jinnah. Abdullah was the maternal uncle of Hafiz Muhammad Saeed and helped him found JuD and LeT and Makki joined the militant organisation on the request of his father and Saeed, after returning from Saudi Arabia in 1995. Saeed, Makki's cousin, is married to his sister, while Makki is married to Saeed's sister.

Makki passed his matriculation and obtained a BA degree, both in Bahawalpur. After that, he completed an MA from University of the Punjab. He served as a lecturer with jihadist connections at the International Islamic University in Islamabad in the 1980s during the Afghan jihad. He later went to Saudi Arabia during the reign of the Islamist Zia-ul-Haq and obtained a doctorate from the Umm al-Qura University in Mecca (while the BBC reports it was in Islamic politics Makki maintains it was in Hadith sciences) and wrote a research paper on Al-Suyuti. He started a business in Mecca and also taught at Umm al-Qura, and in 1992 released a book showing how fedayeen operations are not suicide attacks.

== Militancy career ==
Abdul Rehman Makki, alongside Hafiz Saeed, was working for Difa-e-Pakistan Council (Pakistan Defence Council) which was established to defend the interests of Pakistan and to agitate against the drone attacks in Waziristan, Pakistan. DPC, in its own words, is against the war in Afghanistan. It has also protested against the NATO supplies going through Pakistan.

Makki was in proximity to al-Qaeda's Ayman al-Zawahiri and is also said to have been connected to Taliban's supreme commander Mullah Omar and Abdullah Yusuf Azzam (Osama bin Laden's teacher), while a lecturer at the International Islamic University in Islamabad in the 1980s during the Afghan jihad where he is said to have travelled. He was fluent in Arabic and English and was popular in Pakistan for his anti-India speeches. In 2017, his son, Owaid Rehman Makki was killed in an operation by Indian security forces in Jammu and Kashmir.

After the 2008 Mumbai attacks by LeT, the United States Department of the Treasury designated Makki as a Specially Designated International Terrorist. It listed his address in Muridke, the headquarters of LeT. The Rewards for Justice Terror List had an announced reward of up to $2 million for information leading to the location of Makki.

Pakistan's foreign minister, Hina Rabbani Khar has said that they would need hard evidence to prosecute Hafiz Saeed and his allies such as Makki.

In 2020, an Anti Terrorism Court of Pakistan convicted Makki of terror financing and sentenced him to jail but this was commuted to a Rs. 20,000 fine by another court. He earlier been arrested from Gujranwala and detained at Kot Lakhpat Jail in 2019 for hate speech while soliciting donations for the Falah-e-Insaniat Foundation, a front of the JuD. After his release in 2020, Makki mostly resided in Lahore.

On 16 January 2023, he was designated by the Al-Qaida and Taliban Sanctions Committee of the United Nations Security Council as being associated with ISIL or Al-Qaida for "participating in the financing, planning, facilitating, preparing, or perpetrating of acts or activities by, in conjunction with, under the name of, on behalf of, or in support of", "recruiting for", "otherwise supporting acts or activities of", and "either owned or controlled, directly or indirectly, by, or otherwise supporting" Lashkar-e-Taiba. India and the US had wanted Makki to be sanctioned as a global terrorist back in 2022, but the designation had then been blocked by China.

== Death ==
Makki died of a heart attack in Lahore, on 27 December 2024. He had been suffering from heart disease and diabetes and was undergoing treatment at a private hospital in Lahore. Makki's funeral prayers were led by Hafiz Saeed's son Talha Saeed at the Markaz-e-Taiba in Muridke and he was buried at the local graveyard in Nangal Sahdan.
