= Hafiz Abdul Kareem =

Pakistani politician (born 1960)

- حافظ عبدالکریم

3rd Emir of Markazi Jamiat Ahle Hadith
- Incumbent
- Assumed office 25 May 2025
- Preceded by: Sajid Mir

Ministry of Communications (Pakistan)
- In office 4 August 2017 – 31 May 2018
- President: Mamnoon Hussain
- Prime Minister: Shahid Khaqan Abbasi

Member of the Senate of Pakistan
- Incumbent
- Assumed office 26 May 2025

Member of the National Assembly of Pakistan
- In office 1 June 2013 – 31 May 2018
- Constituency: NA-172 (D.G.Khan-II)

Personal details
- Born: January 1, 1960 (age 66) Karachi, Sindh, Pakistan
- Party: MJAH (2006-present)
- Other political affiliations: PMLN (2008-2018)

Hafiz Abdul Kareem (Note: Urdu: حافظ عبدالکریم) (born 1 January 1960) is a Pakistani politician, Doctor and Islamic scholar who serves as the third and current emir of Markazi Jamiat Ahle Hadith since 2025 replacing Sajid Mir upon his death. He has been a member of the Senate of Pakistan since March 2018.

Abdul Kareem served as Minister for Communications, in Abbasi cabinet from August 2017 to May 2018. He was also a Member of the National Assembly of Pakistan from June 2013 to 2018.

== Early life and education ==
Kareem was born on 1 January 1960. He has completed matriculation level education.

== Political career ==
He ran for the seat of the National Assembly of Pakistan as a candidate of Pakistan Muslim League (N) (PML-N) from Constituency NA-172 (Dera Ghazi Khan-II) in 2008 Pakistani general election, but was unsuccessful. He received 41,894 votes and lost to Farooq Leghari.

He ran for the seat of the National Assembly as a candidate of PML-N from Constituency NA-172 (Dera Ghazi Khan-II) in by-election held in March 2011, but was unsuccessful. He received 41,894 votes and lost the seat to Awais Leghari.

He was elected to the National Assembly as a candidate of PML-N from Constituency NA-172 (Dera Ghazi Khan-II) in 2013 Pakistani general election. He received 49,230 votes and defeated Jamal Leghari.

Following the election of Shahid Khaqan Abbasi as Prime Minister of Pakistan in August 2017, he was inducted into the federal cabinet of Abbasi and was appointed federal minister for Communications for the first time.

He was nominated by PML-N as its candidate in the 2018 Pakistani Senate election. However the Election Commission of Pakistan declared all PML-N candidates for the Senate election as independent after a ruling of the Supreme Court of Pakistan.

He was elected to the Senate of Pakistan as an independent candidate on a technocrat seat from Punjab in Senate election. He was backed in the election by PML-N and joined the treasury benches, led by PML-N after getting elected. He took oath as a Senator on 12 March 2018. On 12 March 2018, he ceased to hold the office of Federal Minister for Communications due to resignation from the National Assembly. On 15 March 2018, he was re-inducted into the federal cabinet of Prime Minister Shahid Khaqan Abbasi and re-appointed Federal Minister for Communications. Upon the dissolution of the National Assembly on the expiration of its term on 31 May 2018, Kareem ceased to hold the office as Federal Minister for Communications.
