= Falah-e-Insaniat Foundation =

Pakistani charity organization

- Formation: 1990; 36 years ago
- Founder: Hafiz Muhammad Saeed
- Defunct: 2019
- Purpose: jihadism, militancy in Kashmir
- Headquarters: Lahore, Pakistan
- Region served: Pakistan
- Method: Donations and Grants
- Website: devotedtohumanity.org (The website has been blocked by Government of Pakistan and is no longer operational)

Falah-e-Insaniat Foundation (FIF) was a charity organization established by Jamat-ud-Dawa and was based in Pakistan. In 2019, the Government of Pakistan banned the organization.

It was founded in 1990 by Hafiz Muhammad Saeed and was based in Lahore, Pakistan.

It belongs to Ahl-i Hadith school of thought of Sunni Islam.

On 21 February 2019, the National Security Committee (NSC) of Pakistan decided to proscribe Jamat ud Dawa (JuD) and Falah-e-Insaniat Foundation (FIF) under Schedule I of the Anti-Terrorism Act 1997. A formal proscription order was issued by the Ministry of Interior on 6 June 2019. The NCS also decided to expedite implementation of the National Action Plan against terrorism throughout the country against all proscribed and UN designated organizations. As part of these efforts, the Federal Government issued the United Nations Security Council (Freeze & Seizure) Order 2019. The objective of the order was to streamline the procedure for implementation of Security Council Sanctions against designated individuals and entities in Pakistan. The introduction of this new law helped to ensure strict compliance with UNSC Sanctions, especially the implementation of targeted financial sanctions against FiF and JuD. Accordingly, in March 2019, on the directives of the Federal Government, all provincial governments in Pakistan seized or took over administrative control of hundreds of establishments run by Jamaat ud Dawa (JuD) and Falah-i-Insaniat Foundation (FIF). Most of these facilities were related to wide humanitarian network of JuD and FiF, including schools, hospitals, madaris, colleges, dispensaries ambulances, and others.
