= Fazal Ilahi Wazirabadi =

Islamic scholar and freedom fighter

Maulvi Mujahid Fazal Ilahi Wazirabadi
- مولوی فضل الٰہی وزیرآبادی
- Fazal Ilahi Wazirabadi (left) with Allama Muhammad Asad

Personal life
- Born: 12 August 1882 Wazirabad
- Died: 5 May 1951 (aged 68) Jhelum
- Citizenship: British Indian; Pakistani
- Occupation: Islamic scholar freedom fighter writer

Religious life
- Religion: Islam
- Movement: Jehad Movement

Muslim leader
- Teacher: Abdul Mannan Wazirabadi

Fazal Ilahi Wazir Abadi (12 August 1882 – 5 May 1951; Urdu: مولوی فضل الٰہی وزیرآبادی) was a Pakistani Islamic scholar and freedom fighter.

== Biography ==
Fazal Ilahi Wazirabadi received his early education from Scotch Mission School at Wazirabad. At an early age, he studied the Quran with translation and theology from Abdul Mannan Wazirabadi.

Fazal Ilahi was the last emir of Tehreek e mujahideen based at Chamarkand, which had originated with the jihad movement of Syed Ahmed Barelvi. He announced its formal end on 14 August 1947, after the independence of Pakistan.

Wazirabadi died on 5 May 1951. He had bequeathed that he should be buried at Balakot. Therefore, his body was taken to Balakot and buried in the graveyard where Syed Ahmad Barelvi and Shah Ismail Dehlvi are also laid to rest.

== Literary works ==
Wazirabadi's books include:

- Jihād-i Kashmīr
- Masʼalah-i jihād-i Kashmīr aur us kī muk̲h̲taṣar tārīk̲h̲
- Kavāʼif-i Yāg̲h̲istān
