= Hafiz Saeed =

Pakistani (born 1950)

- حافظ سعید
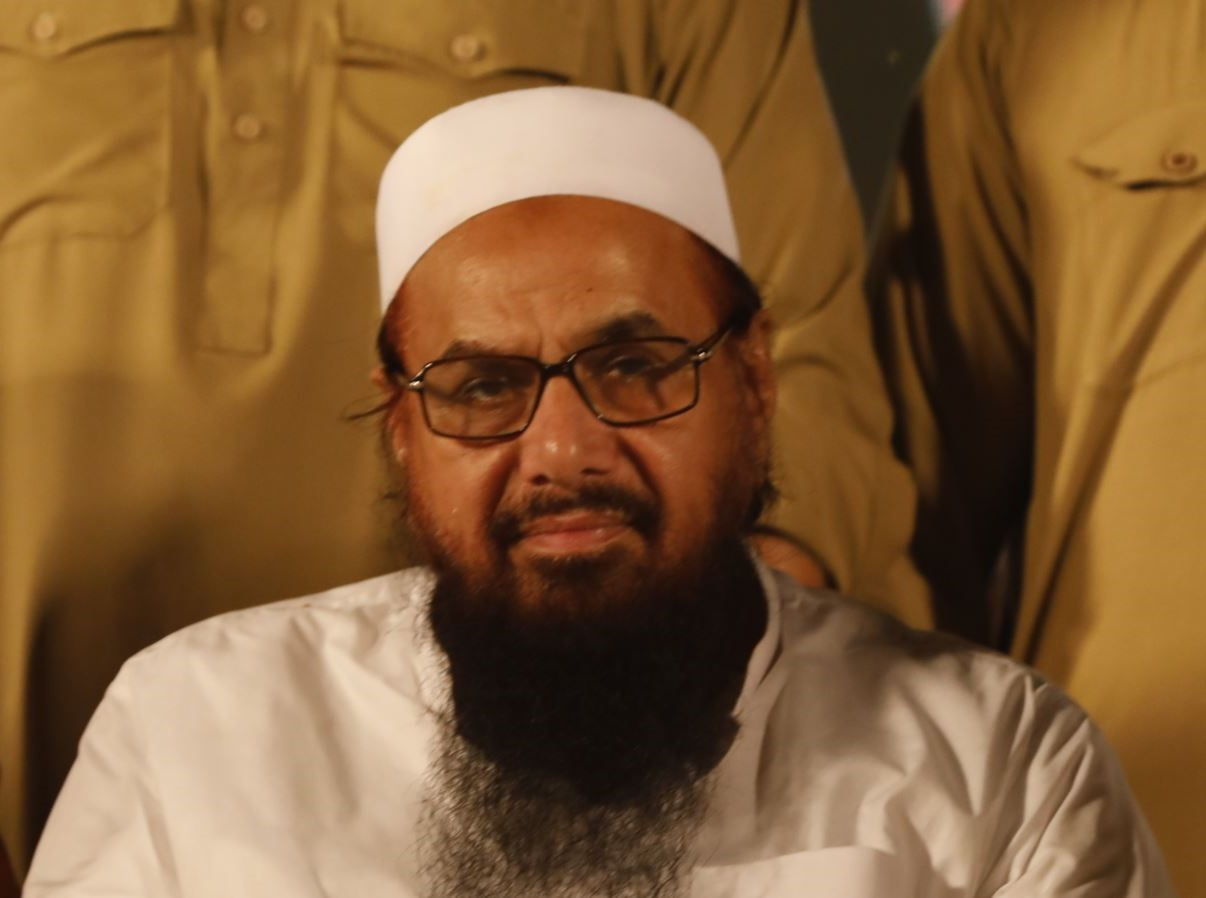
- Saeed in 2019
- Born: Hafiz Muhammad Saeed; 5 June 1950 (age 76); Sargodha, Punjab, Pakistan
- Citizenship: Pakistan
- Known for: Co-founding Lashkar-e-Taiba, 2008 Mumbai attacks in The Taj Mahal Palace Hotel in Mumbai, India
- Political party: Milli Muslim League
- Board member of: Falah-e-Insaniat Foundation; Difa-e-Pakistan Council; Tehreek-e-Azaadi Jammu and Kashmir
- Children: 6
- Relatives: Abdul Rehman Makki (brother-in-law)
- Status: Incarcerated
- Criminal charges: Terrorism, terror financing
- Penalty: 42 years' imprisonment
- Wanted by: National Investigation Agency of India

Details
- Date apprehended: 17 July 2019
- Imprisoned at: Central Jail Lahore, Pakistan

Hafiz Muhammad Saeed (Note: Urdu: حافظ محمد سعید) (born 5 June 1950) is a Pakistani militant and religious preacher convicted of terrorism. He co-founded Lashkar-e-Taiba (LeT), a Pakistan-based Islamist militant organisation that is designated as a terrorist group by the United Nations Security Council, India, the United States, the United Kingdom, the European Union, Australia, and Russia. He is a notorious militant who organised several attacks in India, including the 2005 Delhi Bombing, 2006 Mumbai Train Bombing, 2008 Mumbai Attacks, and 2025 Pahalgam Attack.

In July 2019, three months before the scheduled reviewal of Pakistan's action plan by the Financial Action Task Force, Saeed was arrested by Pakistani authorities and sentenced to an 11-year prison sentence. In early April 2022, he was sentenced an additional 31 years for terror financing.

== Early life and education ==
He was born on June 5, 1950, in Sargodha, Punjab to a Muslim family of Punjabi Gujjars. According to Hafiz Saeed, his father, Maulana Kamal-ud-Din, was a religious scholar, landlord and farmer. His father along with his family migrated from Ambala and Hisar cities of East Punjab (now in Haryana) and reached Pakistan in 1947.

He was named hafiz because he memorised the Qur'an during his childhood, his mother having impulsed him to do so when he was nine, a time during which he was already enthusiastic about the verses on jihad and also took interest in sports such as football and kabaddi. He then attended the Government College Sargodha (now University of Sargodha) before getting a Master's in Islamic Studies at the King Saud University in Riyadh.

A major early influence on his life and ideology was his maternal uncle, and later father-in-law, Hafiz Abdullah Bahawalpuri, who was a famed theologian belonging to the Salafi Ahl-i Hadith, who held that democracy was incompatible with Islam (which alienated him with Maulana Maududi's Jamaat-e-Islami) and argued, on the importance of jihad, "that only in jihad does one offer one's life in the way of Allah, which elevates it to a higher plane than merely fulfilling other religious responsibilities such as saying prayers and paying zakat, also entailing sacrifices and adjustments, but not at the scale evident in jihad" and "considered shahadat (martyrdom) to be the crux of jihad." Bahawalpuri's only son, Abdul Rehman Makki, is Saeed's brother-in-law and has been described as "his close partner."

General Muhammad Zia-ul-Haq appointed Saeed to the Council on Islamic Ideology, and he later served as an Islamic Studies teacher at the University of Engineering and Technology, Pakistan. He was sent to Saudi Arabia in the early 1980s by the university for higher studies where he met Saudi sheikhs who were taking part in the Soviet–Afghan War. They inspired him in taking an active role supporting the mujahideen in Afghanistan. During his studies at the King Saud University, where he was gold medalist for his academic performances as well as taught there, he came under the influence of Salafi scholars like al-Uthaymin and Ibn Baz.

== Personal life ==
Saeed's father ran a grocery store before receiving farmland from the government while his mother opened a madrasa. Three of his brothers, Hafiz Hamid, Hafiz Mastodon and Hafiz Hannan, are involved in Islamic activism as well, having previously run Islamic centres in Boston in the United States.

Saeed's son Hafiz Talha Saeed serves as the Lashkar-e-Taiba second-in-command. He controls the finances of Lashkar. In 2019, Talha escaped an assassination attempt when a bomb inside a refrigerator shop exploded in Lahore. For the 2018 Pakistani general election, Saeed fielded his son, Hafiz Talha, and son-in-law, Khalid Waleed, as candidates but due to the Election Commission of Pakistan's denial of registration to the Milli Muslim League (MML), the political wing of JuD, the candidates contested under the banner of the Allah-o-Akbar Tehreek (AAT), a lesser-known platform.

== Militancy career ==
=== 1987 ===
In 1987, Saeed, along with Abdullah Azzam, Prof.Zafar Iqbal Sardar founded Markaz Dawa-Wal-Irshad, a group with roots in the Jamiat Ahl-e-Hadis. This organisation spawned the jihadist group Lashkar-e-Taiba in 1987. Lashkar's primary target is the Indian-administered territory of Jammu and Kashmir.

=== 1994 ===
In 1994, Saeed visited the United States and "spoke at Islamic centres in Houston, Chicago and Boston".

=== 2001–2002 ===
Pakistan took Saeed into custody on 21 December 2001 due to an Indian government assertion that he was involved in the 13 December 2001 attack on the Indian Parliament. He was held until 31 March 2002, released, then taken back into custody on 15 May. He was placed under house arrest on 31 October 2002 after his wife Maimoona Saeed sued the province of Punjab and the Pakistan federal government for what she claimed was an illegal detention.

=== 2006 ===
After the 11 July 2006 Mumbai train bombings, the provincial government of Punjab, Pakistan arrested him on 9 August 2006 and kept him under house arrest but he was released on 28 August 2006 after a Lahore High Court order. He was arrested again on the same day by the provincial government and was kept in the Canal Rest House in Sheikhupura. He was finally released after the Lahore High Court order on 17 October 2006.

=== 2008–2009 ===
After the 2008 Mumbai attacks, India submitted a formal request to the UN Security Council to put the group Jamaat-ud-Dawa and Saeed on the list of individuals and organisations sanctioned by the United Nations for association with terrorism. India has accused the organisation and its leader, Saeed, of being virtually interchangeable with Lashkar-e-Taiba. India said that the close links between the organisations, as well as the 2,500 offices and 11 seminaries that Jamaat-ud-Dawa maintains in Pakistan, "are of immediate concern with regard to their efforts to mobilise and orchestrate terrorist activities." On 10 December 2008, Saeed denied a link between LeT and JuD in an interview with Pakistan's Geo television stating that "no Lashkar-e-Taiba man is in Jamaat-ud-Dawa and I have never been a chief of Lashkar-e-Taiba."

On 11 December 2008, Hafiz Muhammed Saeed was again placed under house arrest when the United Nations declared Jamaat-ud-Dawa to be an LeT front. Saeed was held in house arrest under the Maintenance of Public Order law, which allows authorities to temporarily detain individuals deemed likely to create disorder, until early June 2009 when the Lahore High Court, deeming the containment to be unconstitutional, ordered Saeed to be released. India quickly expressed its disappointment with the decision.

On 6 July 2009, the Pakistani government filed an appeal of the court's decision. Deputy Attorney General Shah Khawar told the Associated Press that "Hafiz Saeed at liberty is a security threat."

On 25 August 2009, Interpol issued a red notice against Saeed, along with Zakiur Rehman Lakhvi, in response to Indian requests for his extradition.

Saeed was again placed under house arrest by the Pakistani authorities in September 2009.

On 12 October 2009, the Lahore High Court quashed all cases against Saeed and set him free. The court also notified that Jama'at-ud-Da'wah is not a banned organisation and can work freely in Pakistan. Justice Asif Saeed Khosa, one of two judges hearing the case, observed "In the name of terrorism we cannot brutalise the law."

=== Indian attempts at extradition ===
On 11 May 2011, in an effort to place pressure on Pakistan, India publicly revealed a list of its 50 most wanted fugitives hiding in Pakistan. India believes Saeed is a fugitive, but the Indian arrest warrant had no influence in Pakistan and presently has no effect on Saeed's movements within Pakistan. Following the Lahore High Court ruling, Saeed has been moving freely around the country. For many years, India has demanded that Saeed be handed over but there is no extradition treaty between the two countries. On 29 December 2023, India formally requested extradition of Hafiz Saeed for his involvement in 2008 Mumbai Attacks

In July 2025, Pakistan's former Foreign Minister Bilawal Bhutto Zardari stated that Islamabad had no objection to extraditing “individuals of concern” to India, including figures like Hafiz Saeed, as a confidence-building measure provided New Delhi reciprocates cooperation. The remarks, made during an interview with Al Jazeera, came amid heightened regional tensions and mounting internal and international pressure on Pakistan following India's Operation Sindoor. Analysts viewed the statement as a rare acknowledgment of the threat such individuals pose not only to regional stability but also to Pakistan's own internal security and global standing.

=== Cooperation with Islamabad ===
Lashkar has been keeping focus on India and Saeed is among those who are thought to have helped Pakistan in capturing important al-Qaeda members like Abu Zubaydah. Senior Pakistani officials have said that Saeed is helping in de-radicalisation and rehabilitation of former extremists and that security is being provided to him because he could be targeted by militants who disapprove of Saeed's co-operation with Islamabad.

=== American bounty ===
In April 2012, the United States announced a bounty of US$10 million on Saeed, for his role in the 2008 Mumbai attacks. Saeed stated that he had nothing to do with the Mumbai attacks and condemned them. When asked about the bounty, Saeed replied, "I am living my life in the open and the U.S. can contact me whenever they want." He subsequently stated that he was ready to face "any American court" to answer the charges and added that if Washington wanted to contact him, they knew where he was. "This is a laughable, absurd announcement. Here I am in front of everyone, not hiding in a cave", he said in a press conference. Saeed identified his leading role in the Difa-e-Pakistan Council and US attempts to placate India as reasons behind the bounty.

== Declaration as a terrorist ==
The United States declared two Lashkar-e-Tayyiba leaders, Nazir Ahmad Chaudhry and Muhammad Hussein Gill, specially designated global terrorists. The State Department also maintained LeT's designation as a Foreign Terrorist Organisation and added the following aliases to its listing of LeT: Jama’at-ud-Dawa, Al-Anfal Trust, Tehrik-i-Hurmat-i-Rasool, and Tehrik-i-Tahafuz Qibla Awwal. The Department of Treasury said that LeT was responsible for the November 2008 attack in Mumbai which killed nearly 200 people. The group's leader is Saeed, who is listed under UN Security Council Resolution 1267.

He is also listed on India's NIA Most Wanted.

In April 2012, the United States placed a bounty of US$10 million on Saeed for his role in the 2008 Mumbai attacks that killed 166 civilians. While India officially supported the American move, there were protests against it in Pakistan.

After the 2008 Mumbai attacks, he was designated by the Al-Qaida and Taliban Sanctions Committee of the Security Council. He is also listed on the United States Department of the Treasury's Specially Designated Nationals and Blocked Persons List as a Specially Designated Global Terrorist.

== Arrest and trial ==
On 3 July 2019, 23 cases related to terror financing and money laundering under the Anti-Terrorism Act (ATA), 1997 were registered by Counter Terrorism Department (CTD) of Pakistan. According to CTD, JuD was financing terrorism from the funds collected by several non-profit organisations and trusts that included Al-Anfaal Trust, Dawatul Irshad Trust, Muaz Bin Jabal Trust, etc. CTD had banned these non-profit organisations in April 2019. On further investigations, CTD had found that these organisations were linked with JuD and were in touch with the top leadership of JuD.

On 17 July 2019, Saeed was arrested in Gujranwala by the Punjab CTD on the charges of terror financing. He was subsequently sent to the prison on judicial remand by a Gujranwala Anti Terrorism Court (ATC). On 27 September 2019, during the United Nations General Assembly, USA asked Pakistan to prosecute Saeed, Masood Azhar and other UN-designated terrorists. On 30 November 2019, the Government of Pakistan stated that they will prosecute Saeed. On 11 December 2019, he was indicted by the ATC in the charges of terror financing in several cities of Punjab province of Pakistan. As of December 2019, Saeed resides in the Kot Lakhpat jail also known as Central Jail Lahore. He was convicted for five years by a Pakistan court for financing terrorism, in February 2020. On 19 November 2020 a Pakistani court sentenced him for 5 years in prison on terrorism-financing charges making the conviction for a total of 10 years meanwhile an anti-terrorism court in the city of Lahore on fined Saeed 110,000 rupees (about $700). On 24 December he was sentenced to 15 1/2 years in jail by an anti-terrorism court in Pakistan in one more terror financing case along with Rs20,000 (about $125) fine.

While out from prison, Saeed's residence in Lahore was targeted by a bomb blast on 23 June 2021, resulting in the death of three people and the wounding of 22 more. Three people were arrested for the attack. Pakistan's national security adviser Moeed Yusuf said that while the three arrested were Pakistani citizens who planted the bomb, it was suspected that "India was behind the attack".

In August 2026, the Mumbai Police initiated an "in absentia" trial against Hafiz Saeed and five other co-conspirators over their role in the 2008 Mumbai attacks.

== Political and social views ==
=== Pakistani government ===
Saeed has criticised Pakistani leaders and has stated that they should aspire to be more like British Prime Minister David Cameron and London Mayor Boris Johnson. He had declared his admiration for the British Conservative Party along with several Tory MPs when he lodged a petition to the Lahore High Court calling for public officials in Pakistan to tone down their privileged lifestyles. According to The Daily Telegraph, Saeed wrote in the petition that while Pakistan's political elite were 'living like kings and princes in palatial government houses,' Britain's prime minister lived in a 'four-bedroom flat.' He added, 'When the sun never set on the British Empire, the chief executive of that great country lived in the same house of a few marlas in a small street. That is truly Islamic, that is like following the Sunnah of the Holy Prophet.'

Speaking on the issue of arrest of separatist Kashmiri leader Masarat Alam by the Jammu and Kashmir government, Saeed said, "Jihad is the duty of an Islamic government... there is a government in Pakistan and it has always taken the stand that it is the right of Kashmiris to attain freedom. I say what our Army will do to secure the right of the Kashmiris is jihad... We extend help to Kashmiris alongside government ... we call this jihad."

Criticising his anti-India comments, Indian Muslim leader Asaduddin Owaisi said, "People like Hafiz Saeed are unaware about teachings of Islam, jihad in Islam. They are killing innocent lives in Pakistan, children are being killed. They are using Pakistan for maligning another country. The Government of India should take strict action against it and I condemn his comments in clear and strong words." However, in response to India's formal request to extradite Hafiz Saeed in December 2023, Pakistan denied by "citing no bilateral extradition treaty" with India.

=== Indian government ===
In January 2013, India's then Union Home Minister Sushil Kumar Shinde released a statement on the alleged existence of Hindu terrorism as well as the existence of Hindu terror camps on Indian soil, being run and organised by the BJP and the RSS. As a result, Lashkar-e-Taiba and Jamaat-ud-Dawa welcomed Shinde's statements and congratulated him for admitting the existence of Hindu terrorism. Saeed demanded that the United States take serious notice of this statement by the Indian home minister regarding Hindu terrorist camps in India. "The US should now carry out drone attacks on these terror camps in India," Saeed said.

In September 2014, Saeed accused India of "water terrorism". Though there was flood crisis in India too, Saeed blamed India for flood crisis in Pakistan. In several tweets on social media he said, "Indian gov discharged water in rivers without notification & has given false information; an act of open mischief," "India has used water to attack Pakistan, We are in state of War. India's water aggression must be taken to the UN security council."

Responding to a question about the nuclear warning issued by Indian authorities in Jammu and Kashmir after the 2013 India–Pakistan border incidents, Saeed said that in case of a nuclear war between India and Pakistan, India should distribute nuclear safety pamphlets in Delhi, Mumbai and Calcutta rather than in Kashmir.

== Writings ==
Saeed has published the following books and articles, among others:

=== Books ===
- Tafsir Surah Tauba (Exegesis of Surah Tauba). Lahore: Darul Andalus, 2006.
- Tafsir Surah Yusuf (Exegesis of Surah Yusuf), 1st edn. Lahore: Darul Andalus, 2009.

=== Articles ===
- ‘Martial Law Na Jamhooriat Ki Bahali: Sirf Qur’an Wa Sunnah (Neither Martial Law nor the Restoration of Democracy: Only the Qur’an and Sunnah)’. Majallah Al-Daawa, November 1999, 16–18.
- ‘Bharat Dilail Kay Maidan Mein Bhi Shikast Kha Giya (India Has Been Defeated Even in the Battle of Arguments)’. Majallah Al-Daawa, August 2001, 2–4.
- ‘Amriki Nizam-e-Jamhooriat Mein Sab Ko Azadian-Islam Kay Chah’nay Walun Par Pabandi’an-Akhir Kyon? (In the American Democratic System All Enjoy Freedom but Why Are Restrictions Imposed on the Lovers of Islam?)’. Majallah Al-Daawa, February 2002, 2–3.
- ‘Paani, Bijli Aur Mahn’gai Kay Khaufnak Masa’il: Pas-e-Pardah Asal Mujrim Aur Zimmadar Kaun (Frightening Problems of Water, Energy and Inflation: Behind the Curtain Who is the Real Culprit Responsible [for these issues]?)’. Al-Haramain, May 2010, 8–13.

== In popular culture ==
Hafiz Saeed has been portrayed in two Hindi movies in 2015: Phantom, through the character Haaris Saeed, and Baby, through the main antagonist, a Maulana played by senior actor Rasheed Naz from Pakistan. In both cases the movies were fiction showing an imaginary counter-terrorist operation where Saeed would be eliminated as a threat.

== See also ==
- All Parties Hurriyat Conference
- Syed Ali Shah Geelani
- Kashmir conflict
- 2014 Jammu and Kashmir Legislative Assembly election
- List of fugitives from justice who disappeared
