= Ehsan Elahi Zaheer =

Pakistani Islamic scholar and author (1945–1987)

Shaykh Allamah Ehsan Elahi Zaheer
- احسان الٰہی ظہیر

1st Ameer of Jamiat Ahle Hadith
- In office March 1986 – 30 March 1987
- Preceded by: post established
- Succeeded by: Ibtisam Elahi Zaheer (as Ameer of JAHP); Sajid Mir (as Ameer of MJAH)

Personal details
- Born: 31 May 1945 Sialkot, Punjab, British Raj
- Died: 30 March 1987 (aged 41) Riyadh, Saudi Arabia
- Resting place: Jannat al-Baqi Cemetery, Medina, Saudi Arabia
- Party: Jamiat Ahle Hadith
- Children: Ibtisam Elahi Zaheer; Hisham Elahi Zaheer; Motasim Elahi Zaheer
- Parent: Haji Zahoor Elahi (father)
- Education: University of Punjab; Medina University; University of Karachi

Ehsan Elahi Zaheer (Urdu: احسان الہی ظہیر c. 31 May 1945 – 30 March 1987) was a Pakistani Islamic scholar who was the founder of Jamiat Ahle Hadith.

Zaheer was severely injured from an assassin's bomb blast in 1987. He was taken for treatment to Riyadh, Saudi Arabia on the orders of King Fahad, but died in Riyadh and, according to his last wishes, was buried in the Jannat al-Baqi Cemetery in Medina. His assassination marked the beginning of the sectarian violence in Pakistan.

== Early life and education ==
Zaheer was born in 1945 in Sialkot into a deeply religious trading Punjabi family of the Khatri community (Sethi clan) and was formally educated in Ahl-i Hadith establishments in Gujranwala and Faisalabad, before earning Masters in Urdu and Persian at the University of the Punjab, and further continuing his studies in Islamic law at the Islamic University of Madinah (1963–1968) under several prominent scholars, including Sheikh al-Albani and Sheikh Ibn Baz. He was the first Pakistani student at University of Madinah, graduating in 1968, and built long lasting relations with the Saudi scholars and publishers. He subsequently also earned MAs in Arabic, Islamic studies, History and Philosophy from the University of Punjab as well as received an LLB from the University of Karachi.

== Political career ==
=== Jamiat Ahle Hadith ===
In March 1986, Zaheer founded his political party Jamiat Ahle Hadith. Zaheer was a strong critic of the military dictatorship of Zia-ul-Haq. After Zaheer was assassinated, the party was led by his son Ibtisam Elahi Zaheer. He was also the editor of monthly Tarjuman Ahl al-Hadith, and the khatib of Masjid Ahl al-Hadith in Lahore.

== Assassination ==
On 23 March 1987, while Zaheer was addressing a public meeting of Jamiat Ahle Hadith in Lahore, a bomb which had been planted in the flowers on the stage exploded, severely injuring him. Upon the request of Saudi Grand Mufti Abd al-Aziz Ibn Baz, Zaheer was transferred to Saudi Arabia for treatment at The National Guard Hospital. However, he died of injuries on 30 March. His funeral prayer was led by Ibn Baz at the Prophet's Mosque and attended by thousands, including the Pakistani President Zia-ul Haq, ISI chief Akhtar Abdur Rahman, and the Pakistani Foreign Minister Sahabzada Yaqub Khan. He was buried in the Jannat al-Baqi Cemetery.

== Personal life ==
Zaheer's father-in-law Hafiz Muhammad Gondalvi (1897–1985) was also a known Ahl-i Hadith scholar.

Zaheer had three sons, themselves involved in Islamic scholarship and activism: Ibtisam Elahi Zaheer, Hisham Elahi Zaheer and Motasim Elahi Zaheer.

== Books ==
Zaheer wrote fifteen books, mainly in Arabic, although his works have been translated into Urdu and many other languages. After 1979, his works were translated and published across South and South-east Asia.

=== Urdu ===
- Mirzāʼiyyat aur Islām, Idārat Turjumān al-Sunnah, 1972, 240 pages.

=== Arabic ===
- al-Qadiyaniyat : dirasat wa-tahlil, Idārat Turjumān al-Sunnah, 1976, 320 pages.
- al-Shīʻah wa-al-Sunnah, Idārat Turjumān al-Sunnah, 1977, 216 pages.
- al-Bābīyah : ʻarḍ wa-naqd, Idārat Tarjumān al-Sunnah, 1981, 288 pages.
- al-Bahāʼīyah : naqd wa-taḥlīl, Idārat Tarjumān al-Sunnah, 1981, 375 pages.
- Aš-Šhīʻa wa-ahl al-bait, Idārat Tarjumān al-Sunnah, 1982, 316 pages.
- Aš-Šhīʻa wa'l-Qurʼān, Idārat Tarjumān al-Sunnah, 1983, 352 pages.
- al-Barīlawīya : ʻaqāʼid wa-taʼrīḫ, Idārat Tarjumān al-Sunnah, 1983, 253 pages.
- Bayna al-Shīʻah wa-ahl al-Sunnah, Idārat Tarjamān al-Sunnah, 1985, 218 pages.
- Ismāīlīyah : tārīkh wa-aqāid, Idārah Tarjumān al-Sunnah, 1986, 757 pages.

=== English translations ===
- Ibn Taymiyyah's Kitab-al-wasilah. Foreword and translation under the guidance of Ehsan Elahi Zaheer.
- Muhammad ibn Abd al-Wahhab's Kitab at-Tawheed. Foreword and translation under the guidance of Ehsan Elahi Zaheer.
