= Chamarkand =

- Country: Pakistan
- Region: Federally Administered Tribal Areas
- District: Mohmand Agency
- Tehsil: Safi

Population (2017)
  - Total: 11,296
- Time zone: UTC+5 (PST)

Chamarkand is an area of Safi Tehsil, Mohmand Agency, Federally Administered Tribal Areas, Pakistan. In 2017, the population was 11,296.
