= Mansurpur =

- Village
- Location in Punjab, India Mansurpur (India)
- Coordinates: 31.0897379°N 75.7969254°E
- Country: India
- State: Punjab
- District: Jalandhar
- Tehsil: Phillaur
- Elevation: 246 m (807 ft)

Population (2011)
  - Total: 1,273
- Sex ratio 651/622 ♂/♀

Languages
  - Official: Punjabi
- Time zone: UTC+5:30 (IST)
- PIN: 144418
- Telephone code: 01826
- ISO 3166 code: IN-PB
- Vehicle registration: PB 37
- Post office: Bara Pind
- Website: jalandhar.nic.in

Mansurpur is a village in Phillaur tehsil of Jalandhar District of Punjab State, India. It is located 4 km away from postal head office Bara Pind. The village is 6 km away from Goraya, 9 km from Phillaur, 39 km from Jalandhar, and 121 km from state capital Chandigarh. The village is administrated by a Sarpanch, who is the elected representative of the village. Sidhu, Dhaliwal, Mall, Jandu, Sandhu, pal, are main gotra in the village.

== Demographics ==
According to the 2011 Census, the village has a population of 1273. 651 are males, while 622 are females. Mansurpur has a literacy rate of 80.94%, higher than the average literacy rate of Punjab.

Most villagers belong to a Schedule Caste (SC), comprising 72.58% of the total.

== Education ==
Mansurpur has a co-ed upper primary with Secondary school which was founded in 1972. Schools in Mansurpur provide a mid-day meal as per the Indian Midday Meal Scheme.

== Transport ==
=== Rail ===
Ludhiana Junction railway station is 24 km away from the village; however, Bhatian train station is located 3 km away.

=== Air ===
The nearest domestic airport is 41 km away in Ludhiana and the nearest international airport is 134 km away in Amritsar other nearest international airport is located in Chandigarh.
