= Fazal Ilahi =

Pakistani politician

Fazal Elahi (death 24 March 1948) was a Pakistani politician who served as the 1st Deputy Speaker of the Provincial Assembly of the Punjab between 1948 and 1949.

He was to born in Daska to Christianity practicing family and was nominated by Muhammad Ali Jinnah.
