= Abdullah Ghaznavi =

Afghan Islamic scholar (1811–1881)

- Title: Shaykh, Maulana, Allamah

Personal life
- Born: 1811 Ghazni, Durrani Empire
- Died: 15 February 1881 (aged 69–70) Amritsar, Punjab, British India
- Children: Abdul Jabbar Ghaznavi
- Region: Punjab, India

Religious life
- Religion: Islam
- Jurisprudence: Ghayr muqallid
- Creed: Athari
- Movement: Ahl-i Hadith

Muslim leader
- Students: Abdul Mannan Wazirabadi

Abdullah Ghaznavi (1811 – 15 February 1881) was an Afghan Islamic scholar and pietist. A pupil of Sayyid Nazir Husain, he was exiled from his native Ghazni, Afghanistan on account of his adherence to and propagation of Ahl-i Hadith doctrines and had settled in Amritsar, Punjab, where he soon began attracting his own circle of students and admirers.

According to political scientist Dietrich Reetz, Abdullah Ghaznavi represented the ascetic tradition within the leadership of the early Ahl-i Hadith movement in contrast to those who reflected the sect's increasing popularity among the urban elites. Among Abdullah's sons was Abdul Jabbar Ghaznavi.

== Biography ==
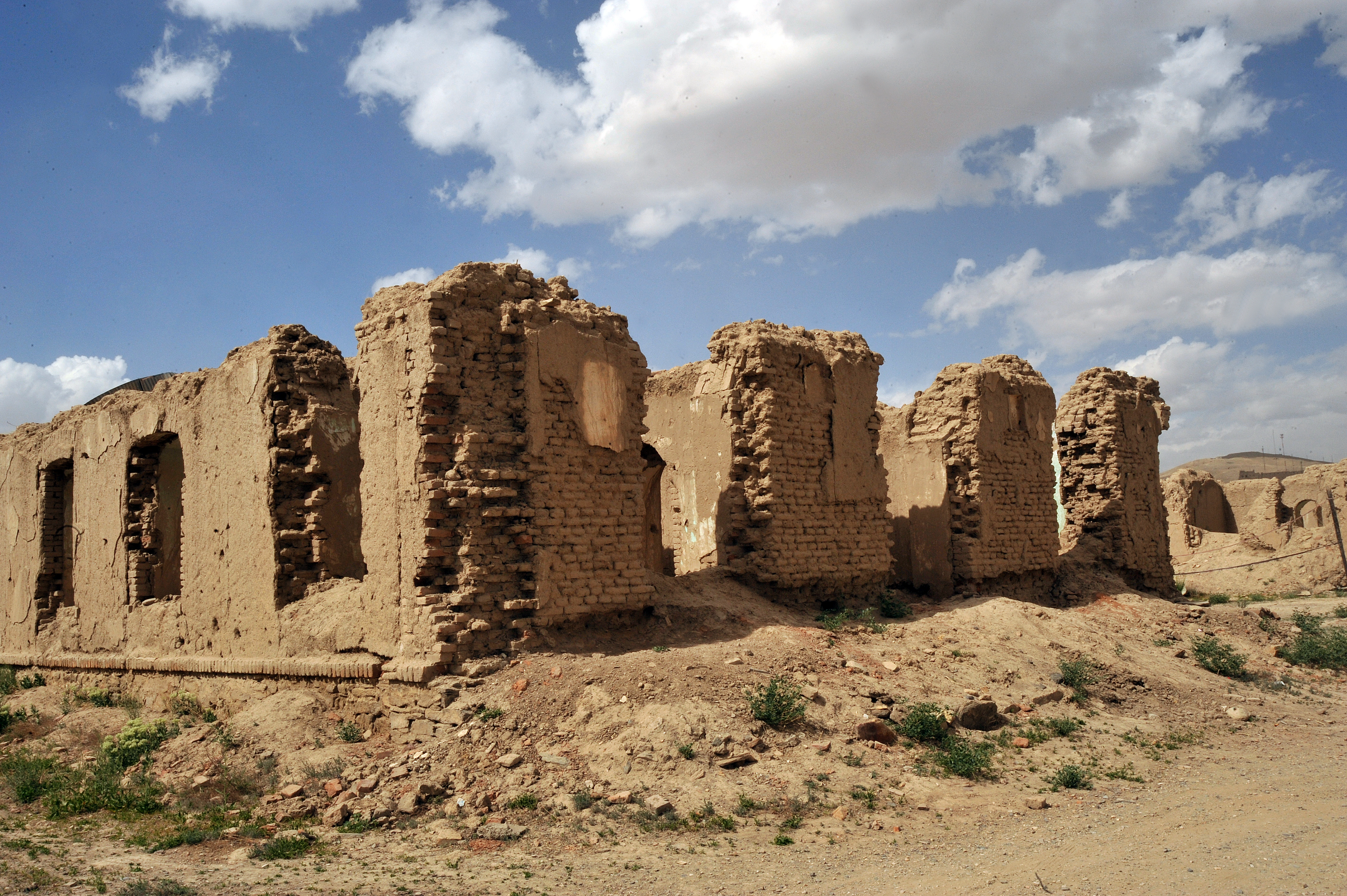
Old Ghazni City in the Ghazni province of Afghanistan

Abdullah Ghaznavi was born in 1811 in the Afghan city of Ghazni. He was given the name Muhammad A'zam at birth but later changed it to Abdullah. After studying with local scholars, he moved to Qandahar to study under the eminent scholar Allamah Habibullah Qandahari and returned to Ghazni after completing his studies. In his youth, Ghaznavi was particularly inspired by the teachings of the Indian Muslim revivalists Sayyid Ahmad Barailwi and his companion Shah Isma'il Dehlawi, having read Shah Ismail's theological work Taqwīyyat al-īmān (Strengthening of Faith). During this period in Afghanistan, Sayyid Ahmad's Ahl-i Hadith followers in neighbouring India were widely, often polemically, associated with the Arabian Wahhabi movement on account of their doctrines and in the context of the Wahhabis' potential for political subversion, something which led Ghaznavi to become a persona non grata in his native country.

Ghaznavi subsequently travelled to Delhi with two companions to study Hadith under the distinguished scholar Sayyid Nazir Husain Dehlawi. He had not completed his studies, however, when the Indian Rebellion of 1857 broke out. Ghaznavi left Delhi and returned to Afghanistan during the conflict. Having adopted a reformist and puritanical orientation, he began preaching openly against perceived religious innovations (bid'ah) and against blind adherence (taqlid) to the prevailing Hanafi school. The traditional Afghan scholars issued a fatwa declaring him to be a kafir (disbeliever) and complained against him to the ruler, Amir Dost Mohammad Khan, who ordered Ghaznavi to be exiled. During the next fifteen years, Ghaznavi travelled to various places throughout north-western India with his family and pupils facing much hostility on account of his teachings wherever he went. Within this period he returned to Ghazni three times and was expelled each time. On the last occasion, he was beaten and then jailed for two years before being exiled.

Upon his release and final expulsion from Afghanistan, Ghaznavi migrated to the Punjab and settled in Amritsar. When he came to that city, however, some of its people started rumours that he was a Wahhabi and this aroused the suspicion of the local British administration. He, therefore, shifted his residence to the nearby village of Khayrdi where he taught in peace. In Amritsar, he eventually established a school, the Madrasah Al-Ghaznawiyah and became an influential representative of the Ahl-i Hadith movement in the area. As his popularity grew, further centres of learning were established in Delhi, Bhopal and Patna. Abdullah Ghaznavi had fifteen daughters and twelve sons many of whom continued his reformist work.

== Accounts of his piety ==
Abdullah Ghaznavi was noted among his disciples for his zealous devotion to God and remembrance of Him. He was said to be Mustajab Ad-Du’a (whose prayers are answered) meaning that many of his prayers were accepted. According to one account, once, while Ghaznavi was busy in the remembrance of God in the mosque, one could hear the walls of the Mosque repeating: lā ilāha illā -llāh (there is no god but Allah). Shams-ul-Haq Azimabadi wrote of him in his Ghayat Al-Maqsud (1/12):

He was in all conditions drowned in the remembrance of Allah (Glorified and Sublime be He) until his meat, bones, veins, hair and all his body was turned towards Allah the Exalted, vanished in the remembrance of Him (Glorified and Sublime be He).

Sayyid Abdul Hay Al-Hasani An-Nadwi Al-Hanafi wrote in his Nuzhah Al-Khawatir (vol 7 p 302–303):

The Shaykh, Imam, scholar Muhadith ‘Abdullah ibn Muhammad ibn Muhammad Shareef Al-Ghaznawi, Shaykh Muhammad A'zam (his original name) Az-Zahid Al-Mujahid (the ascetic striver) walking in the desire of Allah, preferring His satisfaction over his self, his family, wealth and country. He had a prestigious rank and great cognizance.
