= Sanaullah Amritsari =

(British Indian, later Pakistani) Islamic scholar (1968-1948)

- Title: Shaykh al-Islām, Maulana, Sher-e-Punjab

Personal life
- Born: 12 June 1868 Amritsar, Punjab Province, British India (Present day- Amritsar, Punjab, India
- Died: 15 March 1948 (aged 79) Sargodha, Punjab, Pakistan
- Region: Amritsar, Punjab, British India
- Education: Mazahir Uloom; Darul Uloom Deoband

Religious life
- Religion: Islam
- Denomination: Sunni Islam
- Founder of: Jamiat Ulama-e-Hind
- Jurisprudence: Salafi
- Creed: Athari
- Movement: Ahl-i Hadith

Abul Wafa Sanaullah Amritsari (12 June 1868 – 15 March 1948) was a British Indian, later Pakistani, Muslim scholar and a leading figure within the Ahl-e-Hadith movement who was active in the city of Amritsar, Punjab. He was an alumnus of Mazahir Uloom and the Darul Uloom Deoband. He was a major antagonist of Mirza Ghulam Ahmad and the early Ahmadiya movement. He served as the general secretary of the All India Jamiat-i-Ahl-i-Hadith from 1906 to 1947 and was the editor of the Ahl-e-Hadees, a weekly magazine. Taking the major controversy, According to Ahmadiyya sources, Maulvi Sanaullah Amritsari initially accepted a mubahalah (prayer challenge) proposed by Mirza Ghulam Ahmad, under which the false claimant would die during the lifetime of the truthful one. Ahmadiyya publications state that Sanaullah later clarified that he had intended only to take an oath and did not proceed with the mubahalah under the conditions originally proposed.

Ahmadiyya scholars therefore maintain that the prayer challenge was never formally completed because its agreed conditions were not fulfilled. They argue that later criticism based on the order of the two men's deaths does not invalidate the challenge, since Sanaullah had withdrawn from the formal mubahalah. Consequently, Ahmadiyya literature regards Mirza Ghulam Ahmad as having prevailed in the dispute on the grounds that no completed mubahalah took place against him.

== Biography ==
Sanaullah Amritsari's ancestors hailed from Doru Shahabad, a town in Jammu and Kashmir. He was born in 1868 in Amritsar, where his father had settled permanently. He received his early education at Madrasa Ta'īd al-Islām in Amritsar, and later moved to Wazirabad to study hadith under Abdul Mannan Wazirabadi. He then studied with Syed Nazir Hussain in Delhi. He joined Mazahir Uloom for higher education and thereafter completed his studies at Darul Uloom Deoband, where his teachers included Mahmud Hasan Deobandi. He had joined the Deoband seminary in 1890 to study logic, philosophy and Fiqh. He subsequently attended the lectures of Aḥmad Ḥasan at the Madrasa Faiz-e-Aam, in Kanpur.

Amritsari started his career with teaching at his alma mater Madrasa Ta'īd al-Islām in Amritsar, in 1893, and taught the books of Dars-i Nizami. He then became the director of education at the Madrasa Islamiyyah in Maler Kotla. He subsequently stepped into polemics and began debating the proponents of Arya Samaj and specially Ahmadism. He established Ahl-e-Hadith Press in 1903 and published a weekly journal Ahl-e-Hadith which continued for about 44 years. He was a leading figure of the Ahl-e-Hadith movement and served as the general secretary of All India Jamiat-i-Ahl-Hadith from 1906 to 1947. He co-founded the Jamiat Ulama-e-Hind and had a rank of major general in Junud-e-Rabbania. He was president of Anjuman Ahl-e-Hadith Punjab. He was given the title Sher-e-Punjab for his services to Islam in Punjab.

Amritsari migrated to Gujranwala, Pakistan after Partition of India in 1947 and died on 15 March 1948 in Sargodha.

== Literary works ==
Amritsari wrote pamphlets and books mostly in the refutation of Mirza Ghulam Ahmad. The most prominent of them is Tareekh-e-Mirza. (History of Mirza). Syed Mehboob Rizwi has mentioned Tafsir al-Quran be-Kalam al-Rahman, Tafsir-e-Sanai and Taqabul-e-Salasa as his important works.

When Rangila Rasul was written on Islamic prophet Muhammad, Sanaullah Amritsari wrote Muqaddas Rasool as a reply to that book.

He also wrote the book "Haq Prakash" in answer to Dayananda Saraswati's book "Satyarth Prakash".

== Legacy ==
- Faz̤lurraḥmān bin Muḥammad wrote Hazrat Maulana Sanaullah Amritsari.
- Abdul Majid Sohdri wrote Seerat Sanai.

== See also ==
- Muhammad Hussain Batalvi
- Muhammad Sulaiman Salman Mansoorpuri
- Abdullah Ropari
- Muhammad Ibrahim Mir Sialkoti
