= Sajid Mir (politician) =

Pakistani politician and Islamic scholar (1938–2025)

Senator Professor Sajid Mir ساجد میر
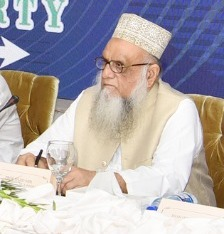
- Mir in 2020

2nd Emir of Markazi Jamiat Ahle Hadith
- In office 1987–2025
- Preceded by: Ihsan Ilahi Zahir
- Succeeded by: Hafiz Abdul Kareem

Chairperson of the Senate Committee on Kashmir Affairs & Gilgit Baltistan
- In office 10 March 2009 – 3 May 2025 Serving with Muhammad Abu Ali Turab
- President: Mamnoon Hussain
- Prime Minister: Nawaz Sharif
- Preceded by: Ali Safar

Member of the Senate of Pakistan
- In office 2021 – 30 March 2025
- Constituency: (General Seat)
- In office 2015–2021
- In office 2009–2015
- In office 23 March 2003 – 2009
- In office 21 March 1994 – 12 October 1999
- Constituency: Punjab (Technocrat seat)

Personal details
- Born: 2 October 1938 Sialkot, Punjab Province, British India
- Died: 3 May 2025 (aged 86) Sialkot, Punjab, Pakistan
- Party: JAH (1987–2025)
- Other political affiliations: PMLN (2009–2018)
- Children: 2
- Education: University of Punjab; M.A. (English literature, 1960); M.A. (Islamic Studies, 1969)
- Occupation: Politician
- Profession: Professor

Sajid Mir (Note: Urdu: ساجد میر) (2 October 1938 – 3 May 2025) was a Pakistani politician and Islamic scholar who served as the second emir of Markazi Jamiat Ahle Hadith from 1987 until his death in 2025. He was also a member of the Senate of Pakistan and served, as chairperson of the Senate Committee on Science and Technology.

== Early life and education ==
Mir was born on 2 October 1938 into a religious Kashmiri family in Sialkot, Punjab, Pakistan. He is a relative of the prominent scholar Muhammad Ibrahim Mir Sialkoti. Mir earned a master's degree in English literature from the University of the Punjab in 1960, followed by a master's degree in Islamic studies from the same university in 1969.

== Political career ==
=== Pakistan Muslim League (N) ===
Mir served in the Senate of Pakistan from 1994 to 2000 and from 2003 to 2025 as a candidate of the Pakistan Muslim League (N) (PML-N). In March 2009, Mir was elected to the Senate on a reserved seat for technocrats and ulema. He served as the chairperson of the Senate Committee on Science and Technology and was also a member of the senate committees of Rules of Procedures and Privileges, the Functional Committee on Government Assurances, and the committee on Overseas Pakistanis and Human Resource Development. Mir also headed the committee that drafted a code of conduct that promoted inter-sectarian harmony in Pakistan. He made noteworthy diplomatic efforts that strengthened the bilateral ties between Pakistan and Saudi Arabia.

=== Markazi Jamiat Ahle Hadith ===
In March 2018, Sajid Mir became the Emir of Markazi Jamiat Ahle Hadith (MJAH). In September 2020, Mir attended the All Parties Conference (APC) and JAH formed the Pakistan Democratic Movement along with ten other parties. Sajid Mir came for many of PDM's public gatherings and powershows. In February 2021, Nawaz Sharif contacted Sajid Mir and gave him a spot on the PML-N ticket for the Senate elections. Sajid won his seat in an unopposed election.

== Death ==
Sajid Mir died due to a heart attack on 3 May 2025, at the age of 86. (Note: Some sources mislabel his age as "85".)

Upon his death, Prime Minister Shehbaz Sharif remarked that Sajid Mir always raised his voice against extremism and sectarianism.

== Books ==
Mir authored and translated several influential works in Urdu and English. His scholarship focused on Hadith studies, comparative religion, and Islamic thought.

Title (Urdu/Transliteration)	English Translation	Type	Description	Publisher / Notes
عیسائیت: تجزیہ و مطالعہ (Isāʾīyat: Tajziyah o Mutāla)	Christianity: Analysis & Study	Book (Urdu)	A 495-page critical examination of Christian theology and scripture from an Islamic perspective.	Dar-us-Salam, Lahore
صحیح مسلم (Sahih Muslim, verified edition)	Sahih Muslim (with Urdu commentary)	Translation/Annotation	Served as editorial verifier for a popular Urdu edition of the Sahih Muslim hadith collection.	Sheikh Muhammad Ashraf Publishers, Lahore
ماذا خسر العالم بانحطاط المسلمين (Urdu translation)	What the World Lost by the Decline of Muslims	Translation	Urdu translation and annotation of Abul Hasan Ali Nadwi’s famous book.	Sheikh Muhammad Ashraf Publishers, Lahore
Al-Hizb al-Maqbūl	The Accepted Invocation	Translation (Arabic–English)	English rendering of a widely recited Arabic collection of du‘ās (supplications).	Available through religious publishers
خطبات (Khutbāt)	Sermons	2-volume collection	A compilation of his public sermons on Qur'an, Hadith, Islamic law, and contemporary issues	

== See also ==
- List of Senators of Pakistan
- List of committees of the Senate of Pakistan
