= Muhammad Ibrahim Mir Sialkoti =

Pakistani Islamic scholar (1874–1956)

Imam, Shaykh al-Islam Muhammad Ibrahim Mir Sialkoti
- محمد ابراہیم میر سیالکوٹی
- Title: Khatib e Azam

Personal life
- Born: 1874 Sialkot, Punjab Province, British India
- Died: 12 January 1956 (aged 81–82) Sialkot, West Pakistan, Pakistan
- Political party: All India Muslim League
- Notable work(s): Wadhih al-Bayan (Tafsir of al-Qur'an); Sira al-Mustafa (Biography of Prophet Muhammad Sallallahu ‘Alaihi Wa Salam); Tarikh Ahl-i Hadith (History of the Ahl-i Hadith Movement)
- Education: Murray College, Sialkot
- Occupation: Muhaddith; Faqih; Mufassir; Khatib; Writer; Historian; Journalist
- Relatives: Sajid Mir

Religious life
- Religion: Islam
- Denomination: Sunni
- Jurisprudence: Ghayr muqallid
- Creed: Athari
- Movement: Salafi

Muslim leader
- Influenced by: ibn Taymiyya; ibn al-Qayyim; Muhammad ibn Abd al-Wahhab; Shah Waliullah Dehlavi; Syed Nazeer Husain Dehlavi; Muhammad Iqbal; Abdullah Ghaznavi
- Influenced: Sanaullah Amritsari; Muhammad Hussain Batalvi; Abul A'la Maududi; Syed Abul Hasan Ali Nadwi; Muhammad Akram Awan; Ahl-i Hadith Movement

Muhammad Ibrahim Mir Sialkoti (Urdu: محمد ابراہیم میر سیالکوٹی, romanized: Muḥammad Ibrāhīm Mīr Siyālkūṭī; c. 1874 – 12 January 1956) was a Pakistani Islamic scholar of the Ahl-i Hadith. He was a muhaddith, khatib, historian, journalist, writer, religious activist and activist of the Pakistan Movement.

He was also an expert on tafsir (Quranic exegesis) and faqih (jurist in jurisprudence) and wrote several books. Mir is considered one of the partisans of Muhammad Ali Jinnah, the founder of Pakistan and Sanaullah Amritsari. In 1945, when Jamiat Ulema-e-Islam was established, Shabbir Ahmad Usmani was its president while Sialkoti was its vice president. Its first meeting was held in Calcutta. Usmani could not attend due to illness then the meeting was chaired by Mir.

Mir was also a major antagonist of Mirza Ghulam Ahmad and the early Ahmadiyya movement and wrote several books rejecting Qadiyanism. Mir was one of the founding members of All-India Muslim League.

== Biography ==
Muhammad Ibrahim Mir Sialkoti was born in 1874 in a religious family of British India's Sialkot. He studied the Quran at home and passed Matric exams in 1895 from Mission High school Gandam Mandi Sialkot. In 1895, after completing his Matric Ibrahim Mir Sialkoti took admission in Sialkot's Murree College where he was a class fellow of British Indian great Urdu poet Allama Iqbal, the Poet of the East and National Poet of Pakistan.

Mir Sialkoti learnt Hadith from Syed Nazeer Husain Dehlavi. Sialkoti knew Arabic and Persian as well.

== Works ==
Sialkoti has written more than twenty books. Most of them are in Urdu language, some of those are:

- Wadhih al-Bayan (Tafseer of al-Quran)
- Sira al-Mustafa (Biography of Islamic prophet Muhammad)
- Tarikh Ahl-i Hadith (History of Ahl-i Hadith in Indian subcontinent)

== Death ==
Ibrahim Mir Sialkoti died on 12 January 1956 AD, 25 Jumada al-awwal 1375 AH in Sialkot. His Funeral prayer was led by Abdullah Ropari and he was buried in Sialkot.

== Bibliography ==
- Mohammadi, Mohammad Ameen (2019). Tehreek-e-Pakistan Me Ulmae Ahle Hadith Ka Kirdar (in Urdu). Lahore: Dar al-Muslimeen, Urdu Bazar. pp. 379–398.
- Iraqi, Abdul Rasheed (2001). 40 Ahl-e Hadith Scholars from the Indian Subcontinent. Independently Published. pp. 224 to 250. ISBN 9781081008956.
