= Muhammad Ishaq Bhatti =

Pakistani Islamic scholar and historian (1925–2015)

Personal life
- Born: 15 March 1925 Kotkapura, state of Faridkot
- Died: 22 December 2015 (aged 89–90) Lahore, Pakistan

Religious life
- Religion: Islam
- Jurisprudence: Ghayr muqallid
- Creed: Atharism
- Movement: Ahl-i Hadith, Independent

Muslim leader
- Disciple of: عطاء اللہ حنیف بھوجیانی, حافظ محمد گوندلوی, Sayyid Qutub ,محمد اسماعیل سلفی, Allama Iqbal

Muhammad Ishaq Bhatti (Urdu: محمد اسحاق بھٹی, romanized: Muḥammad Isḥāq Bhaṭṭī 15 March 1925 – 22 December 2015) was a Pakistani Islamic scholar and historian. A leading figure of Ahl-i Hadith in South Asia, Bhatti was born in Kotkapura in Faridkot State and migrated to Pakistan in 1947 after the partition of India.

== Biography ==
Maulana Muhammad Ishaq Bhatti

Muhammad Ishaq Bhatti was born on 15 March 1925 in Kotkapura in the state of Faridkot (present day Faridkot, Punjab) into a Bhatti family. His father, Abdul Majid Bhatti was a religious person. Ishaq Bhatti learnt Quran at home from his grandfather.

Coinciding with the partition of India in 1947, Bhatti moved to Pakistan with his family.

He died in Lahore on 22 December 2015, aged 90. Inna lillahi wa inna ilayhi raji'un" (To Allah we belong and to Him we shall return). Honorable Dr. Hammad Lakhvi (may Allah preserve him) led his funeral prayer at Nasir Bagh, Lahore. Later, after the Isha prayer in his ancestral village of Dhesians, Faisalabad, Sheikh-ul-Hadith Hafiz Masood Alam (may Allah preserve him) led the funeral prayer. A massive crowd attended the funeral prayer at both locations, with a large presence of scholars and religious people

== Works ==
Bhaṭṭī has written several books in Urdu, including:

- Fuqahā-yi Hind (in Urdu). Lahore: Idārah-yi S̲aqāfat-i Islāmiyah. 1974. OCLC 21694813.
- Cahrah-i nubuvvat: Qurān ke āʻine men̲. Rāvalpindī: ʻIlm o ʻIrfān Pablishraz : Milne ke pate, Kitāb Ghar. 1999. OCLC 62340862.
- Maulānā Abūlkalām Āzād, ek nābg̲h̲ah-yi rozgār shak̲h̲ṣīyat. Paṭna: K̲h̲udā Bak̲h̲sh Oriyanṭal Pablik Lāʼibrerī. 2001. OCLC 49751320.
- Qāfilah-yi Ḥadīs̲. Lāhaur: Maktabah-yi Quddūsiyyah. 2003. OCLC 122336419.
- Barr-i Ṣag̲h̲īr men̲ ṣaḥābah, tābiʻīn, tabiʻ tābiʻīn. Naʼī Dihlī: al-Balāg̲h̲ Pablīkeshanz. 2006. OCLC 87883681.
- Istiqbāliyah va ṣadāratī k̲h̲ut̤bāt : jo Markazī Jamʻīyat-i Ahl-i Ḥadīs̲-i Pākistān kī kānfaranson̲ men paṛhe gaʼe. 2012. OCLC 857754259.
- Taz̲kirah-yi Qāz̤ī Muḥammad Sulaimān Manṣūrpūrī: ʻahd, k̲h̲āndān, asātiz̲ah, hamʻaṣr ʻUlamāʼ. Naiʼ̄ Dihlī: al-Kitāb Inṭarnaishnal. 2007. OCLC 244660730.
- Nuqūsh-i ʻaẓmat-i raftah. Naʼī Dihlī: al-Kitāb Inṭarnaishnal. 2003. OCLC 65340028.
- Gulistān-i Ḥadīs̲. Lahore. 2011. OCLC 824088159.
- Barr-i Ṣag̲h̲īr men̲ Islām ke avvalīn naqūsh : Pāk o Hind men̲ ṣaḥābah, tābiʻīn, tabiʻ tābiʻīn. 2009. OCLC 785785958.

== Bibliography ==
- Salafi, Muhammad Ramzan Yusuf (2011). Mouarrakhe Ahle Hadith Maulana Muhammad Ishaq Bhatti Hayat o Khidmat (Ahl-e-Hadith historian Maulana Muhammad Ishaq Bhatti Life and Services). Sialkot: Maktaba Rahmania.
