= Ahl-i Hadith =

Islamic religious movement in South Asia

Ahl-i-Hadith or Ahl-e-Hadith (Urdu: اہلِ حدیث, "people of hadith"), also rendered Ahl al-Hadith (transl. 'People of the Tradition'), is a comparatively small but vigorous Salafi Islamic reform movement that developed in the Indian subcontinent. It presents itself as continuing the tradition of the prophetic and early caliphal period and professes the same outlook as the early Ahl al-Hadith school. Its modern roots are associated with the 18th-century tradition of Shah Waliullah Dehlawi, the Wahhabi movement, and the 19th-century Indian Tarīqah-i Mūhammadiyyāh, while its development and subsequent prominence were particularly associated with the teachings of Sayyid Ahmad Shahīd, Syed Nazeer Husain, and Nawab Siddiq Hasan Khan. Sources variously place its emergence as a distinct modern movement around 1864, in the early 1870s, or toward the end of the 19th century.

Initially largely coterminous with those described in British India as "Wahhabis", the movement adopted the designation Ahl-i Hadith to emphasize both its commitment to the corpus of ḥadīth, understood as statements attributed to Muhammad and authenticated through chains of transmission, and its political quietism. Its adherents have also described themselves as Muwahideen, Ahl-us Sunnah wal Jamaah, and Ahl e-Hadith. The movement's religious principle has been summarized as the conviction that "whatever the Prophet Muhammad taught in the Qurʾān and the authentic traditions, that alone is the basis of our religion". It accordingly gives particular emphasis to tawḥīd, the unity of Allah, and rejects claims that created beings possess occult powers or knowledge of hidden things. This position is directed especially against claims of supernatural powers attributed to mystics and saints and against what the movement regards as excessive saint-veneration. It likewise seeks to eradicate practices understood as religious innovation, bidʿa, or as deriving from non-Islamic influences.

In jurisprudence, Ahl-i-Hadith rejects taqlid, or binding adherence to established legal precedent, in favour of ijtihad, independent interpretation based directly on scripture and authenticated traditions. Its legal puritanism has consequently been described as exceeding that of the Wahhabi movement: it rejects binding adherence to the four orthodox Sunni schools of law and maintains that a sufficiently learned believer may interpret the Qurʾān and traditions independently. It likewise does not regard the ijmāʿ, or consensus, of preceding generations as necessarily binding. This position brought the movement into conflict particularly with the orthodox Hanafi school, whose adherents constitute the majority of Muslims in Pakistan and India. In contemporary usage, the terms Salafi and Ahl-i Hadith are often used interchangeably; the movement shares doctrinal tendencies with the Hanbali school prevalent in the Arabian Peninsula, while many adherents have identified themselves with the Zahiri school, although some accounts distinguish it in significant respects from predominantly Arab Salafism.

Ahl-i-Hadith acquired considerable influence in urban Islamic intellectual circles in South Asia and organized itself institutionally through the All India Ahl-i-Hadith Conference in 1906. In Pakistan, a political wing, Jamiat Ahle Hadith, was formed in 1986. The movement has also received support and funding from Saudi Arabia.

== History ==
=== Origins ===
Imam Shah Waliullah Dehlawi (1703 – 1762 C.E) is considered as the intellectual fore-forefather of the Ahl-i-Hadith. After his Pilgrimage to Mecca, Shah Waliullah Dehlawi spent 14 months in Medina, studying Qur'an, Hadith and works of the classical Hanbali theologian Ibn Taymiyya (d. 728 A.H/ 1328 C.E) under the hadith scholar Muhammad Tahir al-Kurani, the son of Ibrahim al-Kurani. Upon return to India, he preached Tawhid and a return to the Sunnah, and claimed Ijtihad just like Ibn Taymiyya. Shah maintained that Ijtihad is essential for Muslim scholars for all ages since cognizance of Divine injunctions related to the novel issues of each era is obligatory. He also opposed various rituals of saint veneration and customs at saint's tombs which he held to be idolatrous. Shah's campaigns against bid'ah (religious innovations), emphasis on Ijtihad as well as his political activities were immensely influenced by Ibn Taymiyya. His precepts for reviving an Islamic Caliphate modelled on the Khulafa al-Rashidun as elucidated in his treatises like Izalat al-Khifa, Qurrat al-'Aynayn, etc. echoed the doctrines propounded by Ibn Taymiyya during the 14th/7th century.

After the death of his father, Shah 'Abd al-Aziz continued the works of Shah Waliullah. He was a Muhaddith who emphasized the importance of Hadith with students all across the subcontinent. As a teacher, preacher and social religious-reformer, Shah 'Abd al-Aziz was closely monitoring the socio-political developments in the subcontinent. British were gaining ascendancy in India by capturing power in Bengal, Bihar and Orissa. In 1799, British defeated the Kingdom of Mysore in the Fourth Anglo-Mysore War. When the British armies entered Delhi in 1803, the Mughal Empire was turned into a protectorate of British East India Company, thus gaining political supremacy in the subcontinent. Upon this, Shah 'Abd al-Aziz declared a decisive fatwa declaring India to be Dar-al Harb (abode of war). This was the first significant fatwa against colonial rule in the subcontinent that gave an indirect call to South Asian Muslims to fight colonial occupation and liberate the country. This decisive fatwa by Shah Waliullah's eldest son and successor, Shah 'Abd al Azeez, calling upon Muslims to strive to restore India back to Islamic rule, would greatly inspire his student Sayyid Ahmed Shahid and motivate him to plan for future jihad. After a brief period as a mercenary, Sayyid Ahmad would further pursue his religious studies and re-appeared as an eminent religious scholar and a visionary leader, gaining many disciples. He came to be widely identified as the inheritor of Shah Waliullah's mantle and numerous Sunni Muslims volunteered to join his cause.

=== Indian Jihad Movement ===
Under these circumstances the call to jihad against British rule began becoming popular amongst the Muslim masses. Shah Ismail Dehlvi, the nephew of Shah 'Abd al-Aziz and grandson of Shah Waliullah, would lead a religious revivalist movement. In addition to being an excellent orator, he was also a soldier and military commander. Shah Muhammad Ishaq, the grandson of Shah 'Abd al-Aziz would continue his religious reform after Abdul Aziz's death in 1823. Maulana Abdul Haie, son-in-law of Shah 'Abd al-Aziz was also a reputed scholar. These three theologians prepared the spadework of Tariqah-i-Muhammadiyya, the reform movement that would be known as the Indian "Wahhabi movement". During his last years, Shah 'Abd al-Aziz would give his cloak to Syed Ahmed Bareilly appointing him as his successor. Sayyid Ahmed would campaign against the corruption of various Sufi orders, and initiate his disciples into Tariqah-i-Muhammadiya ("Muhammadiyya Order"). The disciples in this order were required to make a vow that they will strictly abide by Sharia and would not follow anything not proven by Qur'an and Hadith.

One of the prominent disciples of Sayyid Ahmed was Wilayat Ali Khan, a student of Hajji Abdul Haq of Benares; popularly known as the "Nejdi Sheikh". Abdul Haq was an Islamic scholar who spent years studying in the remote Central Arabian Province of Nejd, the seat of the Wahhabi movement. Upon his return, he preached many of its militant ideals and had already established Wahhabi doctrines in South Asia before Sayyid Ahmad's Hajj in 1821. 'Abd al-Haqq would later become a member of Tariqah-i Muhammadiya and join Sayyid Ahmad's Hajj to Hejaz in 1821 along with his disciple Wilayat Ali. Unlike other members of the group, 'Abd al-Haqq travelled to Yemen to study under the theologian Muḥammad b. ʿAlī al-Shawkānī (d. 1834) and would become greatly influential in shaping the teachings of Ahl-i Hadith. Meanwhile Wilayat Ali Khan, being a disciple of both Sayyid Ahmad and the Najdi Sheikh, emerged as an important leader of Indian "Wahhabi" movement and its military campaigns of Jihad.

In 1821, Syed Ahmad embarked on a journey for Hajj in Hejaz accompanied by Shah Ismail Dehlvi and Maulana Abdul Haie with 400 disciples. They performed Hajj in 1823 (1237 A.H) and stayed in Hejaz for 8 months. Shah Ismail and Abdul Haie authored the Arabic book "Sirat e Mustaqim" to call Arabs to their reformative movement. They returned home in 1824. The three scholars then charted a strategic plan to wage Jihad against the colonial occupation across India. Many parts of the subcontinent became recruitment centres for the Mujahideen. When his Pathan disciples offered him territory, Syed Ahmed set-up the Yaghistan as the operations headquarters for the future "Wahhabite" Jihad in 1826 to re-take the subcontinent from the British. However this put the Mujahideen into conflict with the Sikh Empire. In January 1827, Syed Ahmed was elected as Imam and Amir-ul-Mu'mineen (commander of faithful) by religious scholars and tribal chiefs. Soon war broke out between Sikhs and "Wahhabi" Mujahideen.

On 24 February 1828, one of the three leaders of Jihad, Maulvi Abdul Haei, the chief advisor to Syed Ahmed died as an old and ailing person. In his letters to Sikh ruler Ranjit Singh, Syed Ahmed clarified that he did not seek a confrontation with Sikhs, but only their help in defeating the British. Ranjit Singh, for his part, respected Syed Ahmed as a "courageous, bold and determined person". By 1830, many Pathan tribal chiefs rose against the Wahhabi Mujahideen and committed massacres against the Wahhabi emigrants. Disillusioned by this, Syed Ahmed lost interest in the movement and made plans to migrate to Arabia. However, senior advisors such as Shah Ismail opposed the idea and sought to complete the objectives of the movement, despite the setbacks.

On 17 April 1831, Syed Ahmed set out on his last journey for Balakot with the aim to capture Kashmir, accompanied by Shah Ismail. A Pashtun chieftain named Zabardast Khan who made a secret deal with the Sikh commander Sher Singh withheld promised reinforcements. On 6 May 1831, an army of 10,000 Mujahideen faced a strong force of 12,000 Sikh soldiers led by Sher Singh. On that day Syed Ahmed, Shah Ismail and prominent leaders of the Wahhabi movement fell fighting in the battlefield. Sikh victory at Balakot arose jubilation in Lahore. The defeat at Balakot made a devastating blow to the Wahhabi movement.

After the death and defeats of both Sayyid Ahmed Shahid and Shah Ismail Dehlwi; many of his followers continued the Jihad movement across South Asia. Others became the followers of Shah Muhammad Ishaq (1778–1846 C.E), the grandson of Shah 'Abd al-Azeez and head of the Madrasa Rahimiyya in Delhi. Some of the disciples of Shah Muhammad Ishaq would formally establish the Ahl-i Hadith movement.

=== Establishment of Ahl-i Hadith ===
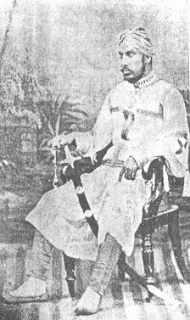
Nawab Siddiq Hasan Khan (1832–1890), one of the founders of Ahl-i Hadith movement was influenced by Yemeni scholar al-Shawkani

In the mid-nineteenth century, an Islamic religious reform movement was started in Northern India that continued the Tariqah-i-Muhammadiyya movement. It rejected everything introduced into Islam after Qur'an, Sunnah, Hadith and the early eras. This was led by Nawab Siddiq Hasan Khan of Bhopal (1832–1890) whose father became a Sunni convert under the influence of Shah 'Abd al-Aziz (1746–1824) and Syed Nazir Husain (1805–1902) who was a student of Muhaddith Shah Muhammad Ishaq (1782–1846), the grandson of Shah 'Abd al-Aziz and his Khalifa (successor). With the aim of restoring Islamic unity and strengthening Muslim faith, they called for a return to original sources of religion, "Qur'an and Hadith" and eradicate what they perceived as bid'ah (innovations), shirk (polytheism), heresies and superstitions.

Siddiq Hasan's father Sayyid Awlad Hasan was a strong supporter of Sayyid Ahmad Shahid and had accompanied him to Afghanistan to participate in his famous Mujahidin movement. Another major source of influence on Khan was the "Najdi Sheikh" 'Abd al-Haqq Benarasi who had returned from Yemen and became the first scholar to teach the doctrines of Yemeni theologian al-Shawkani in South Asia. Benarasi was Khan's Hadith master in Delhi; teaching him doctrines such as rejection of shirk, bid'ah, Taqlid, etc. and became influential in laying the doctrinal foundations of the later Ahl-i Hadith. Khan also had studied under the tutelage of other notable students of Shawkani such as Nāṣir al-Ḥāzimī, ʿAbd al-Qayyūm Buḍhānawī and the Bhopali scholar Ḥusayn b. Muḥsin al-Yamanī.

Syed Nazeer Husain from Delhi and Siddiq Hasan Khan of Bhopal drew primarily on the work of hadith scholars from Yemen in the early years of the movement, reintroducing the field into the Indian subcontinent. Their strong emphasis on education and book publishing has often attracted members of the social elite both in South Asia and overseas. Alongside the Yemeni reformers, the teachings of Shāh Muḥammad Ismāʿīl Dehlvi (1779–1831 C.E) also became highly important in Ahl-i Hadith circles. Shah Muhammad's ground-breaking theological works like Taqwiyat al-īmān (Strengthening of the Faith), al-Ṣirāṭ al-Mustaqīm (The Straight Path), Yak Rūzī (One Dayer), etc. elucidated the core doctrines of the Ahl-i Hadith movement. All these works called upon the believers to uphold the principle of Tawhid (montheism), and condemned various practices associated with saint-venerations, visitations to tombs, Sufi rituals, etc. as shirk (polytheism).

Following the teachings of Shah Ismail, Ahl-i Hadith also rejected Taqlid to works of classical Sunni Fiqh (jurisprudence) and believed in direct understanding of Qur'an and Hadith. Due to their connections with Shah Ismail and Sayyid Ahmad's Jihad movement, Ahl-i Hadith were considered as "Wahhabi" conspirators by the British administration. The anti-colonial activism of Ahl-i Hadith religious reformers as well as their sympathies for Jihad made them the primary target more than any other reform movement. For the British imperial statesmen, their endeavours were part of a wider "Wahhabi" conspiracy. Apart from the British, many Hanafite scholars also were critical of Sayyid Ahmad and his followers. Throughout the 19th century, Ahl-i Hadith scholars were persecuted under various pretexts during the "Wahhabi trails" (of 1850s–1870s). Eventually the leaders of the movement sought pragmatic accommodation with the British Raj in order to stop the repression campaign against Wahhabis. Upon the petition of Ahl-i-Hadith scholar Muhammad Hussain Batalvi to the British Indian Administration, the government of India issued a notification in 1886, stopping the use of the term "Wahhabi" in official correspondence. In a victory to reform movement, the government conceded to referring the community as "Ahl-i Hadith".

University of Paris political scientist Antoine Sfeir has referred to the movement as having an elitist character which perhaps contributes to their status as a minority in South Asia. Folk Islam and Sufism, commonly popular with the poor and working class in the region, are anathema to Ahl-i Hadith beliefs and practices. This attitude toward Sufism has brought the movement into conflict with the rival Barelvi movement even more so than the Barelvis perennial rivals, the Deobandis.

In the 1920s, the Ahl-i Hadith opened a center for their movement in Srinagar. Followers of the Hanafi school of law, forming the majority of Muslims in Jammu and Kashmir, socially boycotted and physically attacked Ahl-i Hadith followers, eventually declaring such followers to be apostates and banning them from praying in mainstream mosques. From the 1930s the group also began to be active in the political realm of Pakistan, with Ehsan Elahi Zaheer leading the movement into a full foray in the 1970s, eventually gaining the movement a network of mosques and Islamic schools. Following other South Asian Islamic movements, the Ahl-i Hadith now also administer schools and mosques in the English-speaking world. In the modern era, the movement draws both inspiration and financial support from Saudi Arabia, now being favoured over the rival Deobandi movement as a counterbalance to Iranian influence.

== Tenets ==
Its adherents oppose taqlid. They reject being bound by the four mainstream Islamic jurisprudential Mad'habs, and the four Imams. Hence they are known as ghair muqallidīn (non-conformists). They repudiate the traditions of the schools of jurisprudence and consider it permissible to seek guidance directly from Qur'an and authentic hadith. This set them in opposition to the Sufi sects of the subcontinent with whom they often have arguments, and they disagree with followers of the Hanafi school of thought due to jurisprudential differences. Classical treatises of Hanbali theologian Ahmad ibn Taymiyya constitute one of the most important doctrinal references of the Ahl-i Hadith. These works were introduced to them under the influence of prominent Yemeni traditionalist scholar Muhammad al-Shawkani.

Ahl-i-Hadith movement continues the reform tradition of Shah Waliullah Dehlawi (1703–1762) whom the adherents regard as its first modern member. They also draw upon the teachings of his son Shah 'Abd al-Aziz Muhaddith Dehlavi, his follower Syed Ahmed Barelvi, and the Yemenite Qadi Muhammad al-Shawkani (whom they regard as Shaykh al-Islam). Siddiq Hasan Khan's father studied under Shah Abd al-Aziz and Syed Nazir Husain was a student of the Muhaddith Shah Muhammad Ishaq, a grandson of Shah Waliullah Dehlawi. Due to their reliance on the Qur'an and hadith only and their rejection of Qiyas (analogical reasoning) in Islamic law, the modern-day Ahl-i Hadith are often compared to the older Zahiri school of Fiqh (Islamic law), with which the Ahl-i Hadith consciously identify themselves.

Shah Ismail Dehlvi's book Taqwiyat-ul-Iman is viewed as the manifesto of the Ahl-i-Hadith movement. In it he emphasised on the pristine monotheism of Islam and condemned what he viewed as heretic un-Islamic customs that violated Tawhid. Such customs included celebration of death anniversary of Awliyaa (Saints), asking their mercy or invoking Allah's blessing through them. Ahl-i Hadith condemned practices such as visiting the Prophet's grave and various customs related to saint veneration fervently, in a tone which rivaled in intensity to that of the Arabian Muwahhidun movement.

While their educational programs tend to include a diverse array of Muslim academic texts, few adherents of the movement ascribe themselves to one school of Muslim jurisprudence, placing a greater emphasis on personal responsibility to derive judgments and ritual practice. While the movement's figureheads have ascribed to the Zahirite legal school, with a great number of them preferring the works of Yemeni scholar Muhammad al-Shawkani, the generality of the movement is described as respecting all Sunni schools of Islamic law while preferring to take directly from the Qur'an, prophetic tradition and 'Ijma (consensus) of the early generations of Muslims. While the movement has been compared to Salafist movement in Arab nations and been branded as Wahhabist by the opposing Barelwi movement, the Ahl-i Hadith remain similar to yet distinct from Salafists.

According to Islamic scholar Muhammad Asadullah al-Ghalib, the aim and objective of the Ahl-i Hadith movement is:

"To earn the satisfaction of Allah by preaching and establishing unmixed Tawheed and by following properly the Kitab and Sunnah in all spheres of life. The social and political aim of Ahle Hadeeth Movement is to make all out reforms of the society through the reforms of Aqeedah and Amal."

== Practices ==
Like other Islamic reform movements, the Ahl-i Hadith are distinguished by certain common features and beliefs. The men tend to have a particular style of untrimmed beard often considered a visual indicator. In regard to ritual acts of 'Ibadah (Islamic acts of worship), the movement's practices are noticeably different from the Hanafi madh'hab (legal school) which predominates in South Asia; the men hold their hands above the navel when lined up for congregational prayer, raise them to the level of their heads before bowing, and say "Ameen" out loud after the prayer leader. Ahl-i Hadith call for a return to the first principles and for a revival of "the original simplicity and purity to faith and practices." They are also opposed to foreign customs and beliefs that crept into Muslim societies as well as foreign philosophical thoughts and Sufi mystical concepts such as Ma'rifat. The movement also distinguished itself from the Wahhabi movement, which followed the Hanbali legal school and its rulings, while the Ahl-i Hadith adherents considered themselves as following no single madh'hab (legal school).

Breaking with the dominant Hanafi and Sufi customs, they also emphasise the fraternity and equality of all Muslims; such as permitting Muslim women to pray in Masjids, addressing the Khutbah (Friday sermons) to both villagers and city-dwellers in the native languages, making divorce procedure easy and accessible to women, rejecting triple Talaq, authorising marriage contracts between poor and affluent classes of the society, etc. Other key themes include living a pious and disciplined life by working hard; and attainment of Ihsan (spiritual perfection) through virtuous deeds. While the movement became popular amongst the affluent urban classes, it also has considerable sway in the rural regions.

According to Professor Abdul Ali, former chairman and Director of the Department of Islamic Studies, Aligarh Muslim University:

"The Ahl-i-Hadith movement was inspired by the school of thought of Shah Wali Allah of Delhi, who in the eighteenth century, imparted renewed emphasis on the study of Hadith, and raised his voice against the principle of taqlid in legal matters by justifying the principle of ijtihad, which gave Hadith the right of primacy over the rulings of the juristic schools. This particular trend in Shah Wali Allah's thought became the starting point of Ahl-i-Hadith movement... The Ahl-i-Hadith movement which was started in India in the nineteenth century was quite different from that of Wahhabism, because it drew its inspiration not from Muhammad bin 'Abd al-Wahhab of Najd but from his Indian contemporary Shah Waliullah of Delhi. At the same time... both these movements had some elements of religious purification in their rejection of taqlid and innovation."

== Relations with other Reform Movements ==
=== With Wahhabi Movement ===
The Wahhabi movement was a revivalist movement that emerged in the Arabian Peninsula in the 18th century, and shared reformist, traditionalist heritage of Ahl-i Hadith. During the late 19th century, Wahhabi scholars would establish contacts with Ahl-i-Hadith and many Wahhabi students would travel to South Asia to study under the Ahl-i-Hadith ulama, and later became prominent scholars in the Arabian Wahhabi establishment.

Both the Wahhabis and Ahl-i-Hadith shared a common creed, opposed Sufi practices such as visiting shrines, seeking aid (istigatha) from dead 'Awliya (Islamic saints), etc. Both the movements revived the teachings of the medieval Sunni theologian and jurist, Ibn Taymiyya, whom they considered as "Shaykh al-Islam". With the resources of Muslim principality of Bhopal at his disposal, Muhaddith Nawab Siddiq Hasan Khan became a strong advocate the Ahl-i-Hadith cause in India. Suffering from the instabilities of 19th-century Arabia, many Wahhabi ulema would make their way to India and study under Ahl-i-Hadith patronage. Prominent Saudi scholars like Hamad ibn 'Atiq would make correspondence with Siddiq Hasan Khan; requesting him to send various classical works, due to scarcity of classical treatises amongst the 19th-century Najdi scholars. He would send his eldest son, Sa'd ibn Atiq, to India to study under Siddiq Hasan Khan as well as Sayyid Nazir Hussain for over nine years. Sa'd ibn Atiq would become a major scholarly authority in the Third Saudi State. He was appointed by Ibn Saud as the qadi of Riyadh as well as the Imam of Grand Mosque of Riyad giving him great influence in the educational system. Amongst his students was Abd al-Aziz Ibn Baz, who was highly influenced by the Indian Ahl-i-Hadith. Another son of Sa'd Ibn Atiq as well as other prominent Najdi scholars from Al Ash-Shaykh would study with the Indian Ahl-i-Hadith during the 19th and early 20th centuries.

Ahl-i Hadith leader Nawab Sīddïq Hasān Khán (1832–1890 C.E/ 1248–1307 A.H) nevertheless strongly objected to the usage of the term "Wahhabi"; viewing it as a restrictive regional term primarily rooted in geography and also considered the term to be politically manipulative. According to him, labelling the exponents of Tawhid as "Wahhabi" was wrong since it symbolised a form of regionalism that went against Islamic universalism. Khan argued that the term has contradicting, unrelated and narrow localised connotations across different parts of the World. He pointed out that the term had been used by British colonial officials as a political pejorative phrase, and argued that it had been employed to incorrectly categorize anti-colonial Indian Muslims as being aligned with the movement of Ibn 'Abd-al-Wahhab of Arabia. Khan further argued that the colonial authorities had incorrectly applied the term to a wide range of anti-colonial Islamic reform movements in India. He distanced himself as well as the Indian Muslim public from this label, writing:

To call those Indian Muhammadans who do not worship tombs and pirs and prohibit people from unlawful acts by the name Wahabi is entirely false for several reasons: In the first place they do not represent themselves as such, on the contrary they call themselves Sunnis. If there was anything of Wahabism in their creed they would call themselves by that name and should not resent the epithet. Those who worship one God object to being called Wahabis in the Abd al-Wahhab kind of way not only because of his belonging to a different nation and all its politics, but because they consider God as the ruler and protector of the whole world and this [universalist] stance is blunted if they are said to be followers of a territorially rooted Abd al-Wahhab."

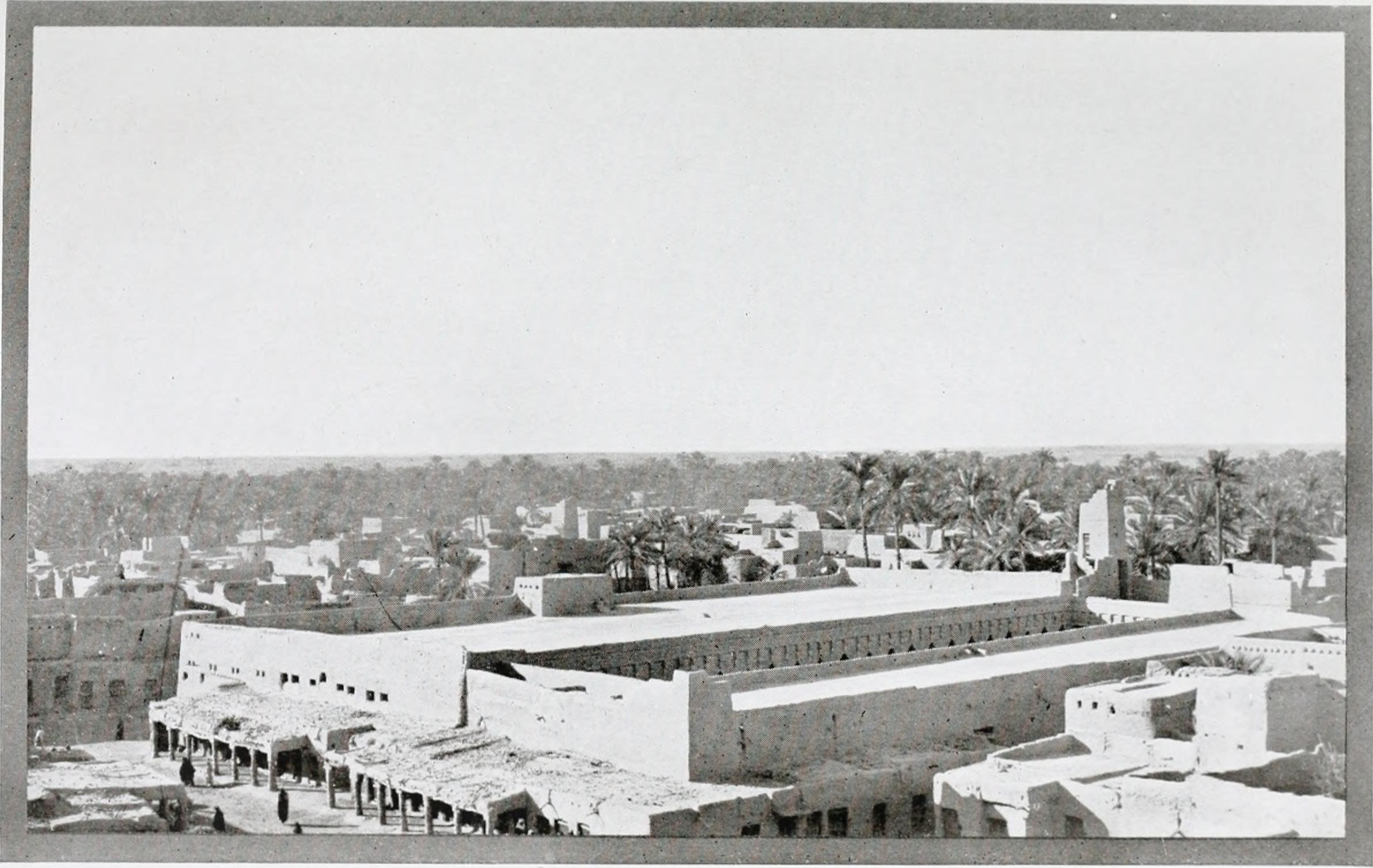
An early photo of the Grand Mosque of Riyadh circa. 1922.

In 1931, Ahl-i-Hadith scholar Shaykh Ahmad ibn Muhammad al-Dehlawi, founded the Dar-ul-Hadith institute, which would later be attached to the Islamic University of Medina. It encouraged the study of Hadith across Hejaz and paved the way for Muhammad Nasiruddin al-Albani and his Muhaddith factions in the 1960s. With the support of Saudi Grand Mufti Ibn Baz, culminating in the consolidation of the contemporary Salafi Manhaj. Ibn Baz, who was highly influenced by Ahl-i-Hadith, shared the passion for revival of Hadith sciences. After the establishment of Third Saudi State and oil boom, the Saudi Sheikhs would repay their debts by supporting Ahl-i-Hadith through finances as well as mass publications. Mufti Muhammad ibn Ibrahim's teachers also included students of Ahl-i-Hadith scholars and he too made efforts to support the South Asian Ahl-i-Hadith cause. After Mufti Muhammad, Ibn Baz as the Grand Mufti of Saudi Arabia would greatly support the movement. Prominent Ahl-i-Hadith scholars such as Shaykh Abdul Ghaffar Khan would be appointed to teach in Saudi Universities. His famous students included Safar al-Hawali and Muqbil bin Hadi al-Wadi'i. With Saudi patronage, a vast Ahl-i-Hadith networks were expanded in South Asia, experiencing a phenomenal increase from 134 in 1988 to 310 in 2000 (131 percent) and currently number around 500. According to Pakistani estimates 34,000 students studied under Ahl-i-Hadith madrassas in 2006 compared to 18,800 in 1996. Ahl-i-Hadith has had remarkable success in converting Muslims from other schools of thought.

=== With Salafiyya Movement ===
The early Salafiyya reformers of the Arab World would influence and impart influence on Ahl-i-Hadith scholars. The Iraqi Salafi scholar Khayr Al-Din Al-'Alusi (d. 1317 A.H/ 1899 C.E) corresponded with Ahl-i-Hadith scholar Siddiq Hassan Khan and praised him as a religious reformer. Influenced by Ahl-i-Hadith, Salafi scholars like Sayyīd Rashīd Ridá (d. 1354 A.H/ 1935 C.E) would call for a non-madhab or pre-madhab approach to Fiqh (Jurisprudence). 'Abd al-Baqi al-Afghani (d. 1905) who was influenced by Ahl-i-Hadith in the subcontinent would also be active the reform movements in Syria. Syrian Islamic scholar Muhammad Nasir al-Din al-Albani too would be highly influenced by Ahl-i-Hadith and would be known as an excellent Muhaddith. The Salafiyya Ulema shared with the Ahl-i-Hadith, a common interest in opposing various Sufi practices, denounce Taqlid (blind following), reviving correct theology and Hadith sciences.

== Organizations ==
Leading proponents of the movement joined forces against the opposition they faced from established ulama (religious scholars) and in 1906 formed the All India Ahl-i-Hadis Conference. The Jamiat Ahl-e-Hadees was represented in the All India Azad Muslim Conference, which opposed the partition of India. One member organization of the All India Ahl-i-Hadis Conference is the Anjuman-i-Hadith, formed by students of Sayyid Miyan Nadhir Husain and divided into Bengal and Assam wings. After the 1947 separation of India and Pakistan, the Pakistani Ahle-Hadith center was based in and around Karachi.

In 1930 Ahl-i Hadith was founded as a small political party in India. In Pakistan, the movement formed a political party, Jamiat Ahle Hadith, which unlike similar Islamic groups opposed government involvement in affairs of sharia law. Their leader, Ehsan Elahi Zaheer, was assassinated in 1987. The Ahl-i Hadith opposes Shi'i doctrines.

== Demographics ==
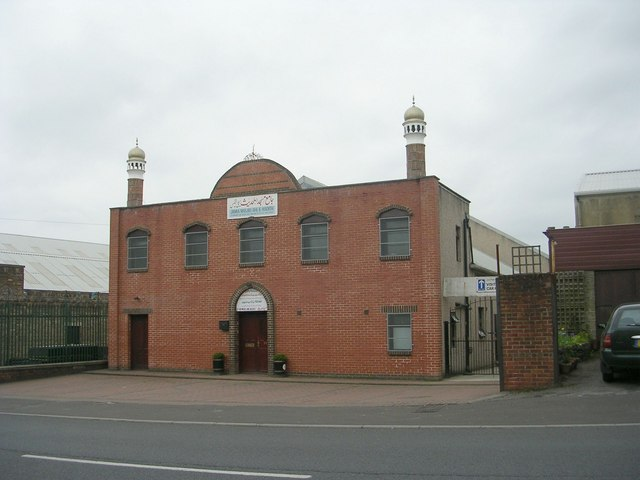
Jamia Masjid Ahl-e-Hadith, an Ahl-i Hadith mosque in Halifax, West Yorkshire.

During the rule of the British Raj, no accurate census was ever taken of the movement's exact number of followers. The group itself claims 22 million followers in India (out of a population of 1396 million) and 10 million in Pakistan (out of a population of 227 million), as well 25 millions in Bangladesh with strongholds in 40 districts of the country.

In the United Kingdom, the Ahl-i Hadith movement maintains 42 centers and boasts a membership which was estimated at 5,000 during the 1990s and 9,000 during the 2000s. Although the movement has been present in the UK since the 1960s, it has not been the subject of extensive academic research and sources on the movement are extremely limited and rare.

== Relationship with other Muslim sects ==
=== Pakistan ===
The Ahl-i Hadith is opposed to practices associated with Sufi Awliyaa (Saints). In Pakistan, although many Salafi groups shun violence, some Ahl-i Hadith organizations advocate militant actions. The Ahl-i Hadith militant organizations such as Lashkar-e-Taiba, an armed wing of Markaz Dawah wal Irshad (MDI), have targeted Indian security forces as well as Barelvis, Shias and Ahmadis. Another organisation, Tehreek e-Mujahideen (an armed Wing of Markazi Jamiat Ahle Hadith), has targeted Indian security forces in the contested state of Kashmir. During the Afghan Jihad of 1980s, the Pakistani state encouraged madrassas to fight the Soviet forces, militarizing many organizations including Salafi/Ahle Hadith groups. In sharp contrast, Indian Salafists have been regarded as being "peaceful" and "non-violent." While the organization Lashkar-e-Taiba has recruited followers of the Ahl-i Hadith movement in the past, the organization's views on jihad alienate the mainstream adherents of the Ahl-i Hadith movement. Lashkar e-Taiba is considered responsible for various attacks on Indian soil including the 2008 Mumbai attacks that killed more than 160 people.

=== India ===
The Indian Ahle Hadith movement has largely remained apolitical, focusing primarily on religious issues and also encourage participation in the democratic process.

=== Afghanistan ===
When the Deobandi Taliban first came to power in Afghanistan in the 1990s, they had suppressed Salafist trends. However, after the post-9/11 US Invasion of Afghanistan, Taliban were forced to ally with Salafists. Many Salafist footsoldiers and Ahl-i Hadith organisations joined the Taliban insurgency (2001–2021) under the Afghan Taliban's command. After Taliban victory in the War in Afghanistan and Restoration of the Islamic Emirate, hundreds of Ahl-i Hadith ulema would gather to announce their Bay'ah (pledge of allegiance) to the Islamic Emirate of Afghanistan. A number of Ahl-i Hadith clerics and their representatives held gatherings across various provinces of Afghanistan to re-affirm their backing of the Taliban and officially declare their support of the Taliban crackdown on IS-K.

== Prominent Ahl-i Hadith figures ==
=== Scholastic ===
- Syed Nazeer Husain
- Siddiq Hasan Khan
- Abdullah Ghaznavi
- Abdul Mannan Wazirabadi
- Muhammad Husain Batalvi
- Sana'ullah Amritsari
- Dawood Ghaznavi
- Shams-ul-Haq Azimabadi
- Muhammad Asadullah Al-Ghalib
- Zubair Ali Zai
- Abdullah al-Baqi
- Muhammad Nasir al-Din al-Albani

=== Political/militant ===
- Ehsan Elahi Zaheer
- Sajid Mir
- Hafiz Saeed
- Abdul Rehman Makki
- Jamil al-Rahman

== See also ==
- Outline of Islam
- Glossary of Islam
- Index of Islam-related articles
- Salafi movement
- Jamiat Ahle Hadith
- Bid'ah
- Wahhabism
- Ahle Hadith Andolon Bangladesh
