= Gurmit Singh Aulakh =

Research Scientist, activist (1938–2017)

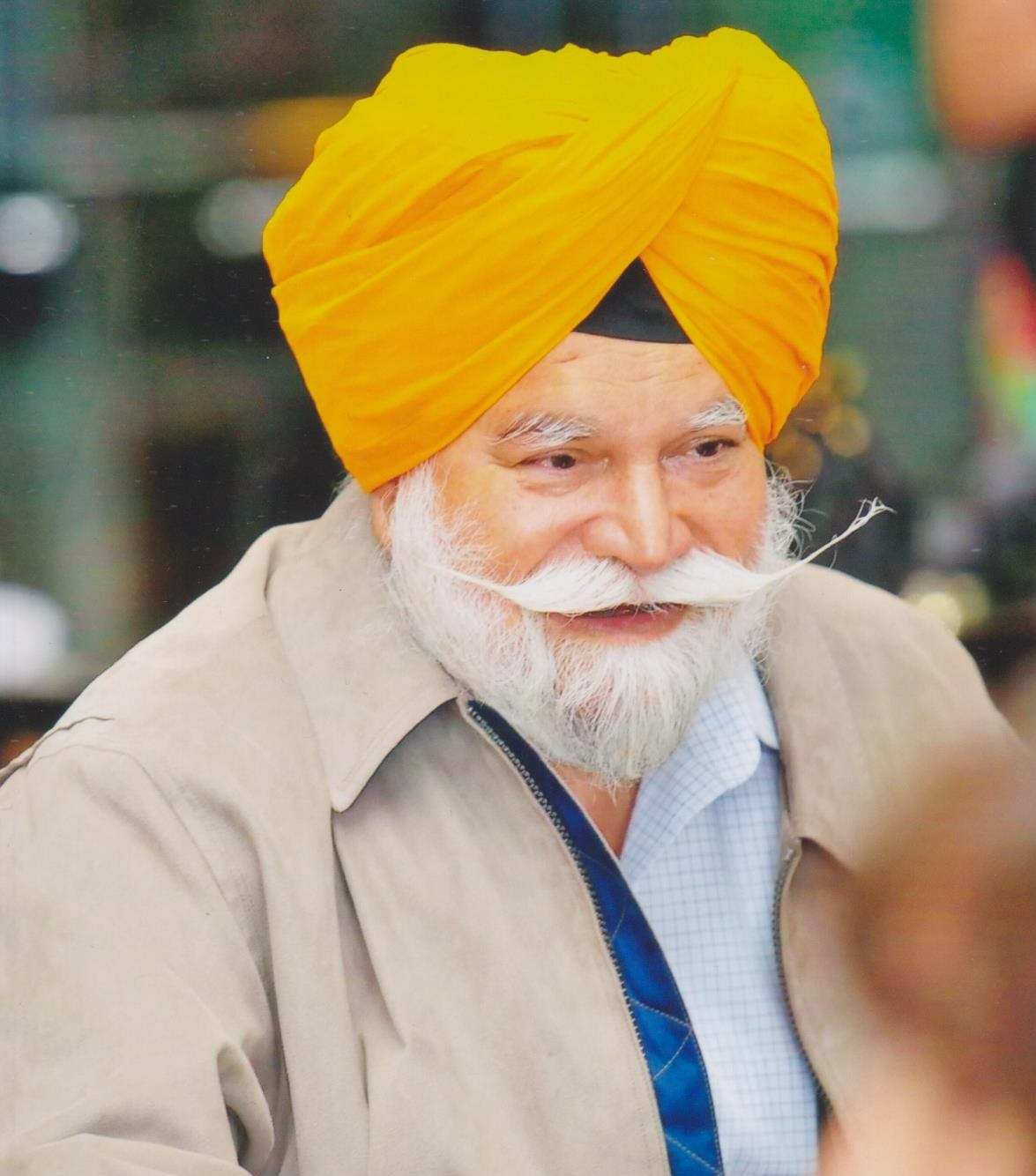
- Aulakh in 2008

2nd President of the Council of Khalistan
- In office 7 October 1987 – 21 June 2017
- Preceded by: Jagjit Singh Chohan
- Succeeded by: Bakhshish Singh Sandhu

Personal details
- Born: 30 January 1938 Lyallpur, Punjab, British India
- Died: 21 June 2017 (aged 79) Washington, D.C., U.S.
- Spouse: Charnjit Kaur Sandhu
- Children: 3
- Education: Khalsa College (B.Sc.); Jordan Hill College of Education (Teacher Training); Howard University (PhD)
- Occupation: Research Scientist; Activist; Politician

Gurmit Singh Aulakh (1938–2017) was a research scientist and activist in the United States who was the former President of the Council of Khalistan, a non-profit political organization based in Washington, D.C. that supports the Khalistan movement in the Punjab region of the Indian subcontinent.

== Lobbying in Washington D.C. ==
He supported the plight of the Sikhs in India that suffered systematic, state-sponsored human rights abuses throughout the 1980s and 1990s. In 2013 Dr. Aulakh's organization (ISO) published a two volume set that compiled all the U.S. Congress statements and other reference documents regarding the Sikhs' movement for political and human rights in India. This compilation runs 1,600 pages and covers the period of 1985–2007. A much-shortened list of US Congressmen quoted in this compilation follows:

- Rep. Dan Burton (R), Indiana.
- Rep. Vic Fazio (D), California.
- Rep. Gene Chappie (R), California.
- Rep. Robert Dornan (R), California.
- Rep. George Miller (D), California.
- Rep. Bernard Dwyer (D), New Jersey.
- Rep. Wally Herger (R), California.
- Rep. Norm Shumway (R), California.
- Rep. Jack Fields (R), Texas.
- Rep. Dana Rohrabacher (R), California.
- Edolphus Towns, member of the U.S. House of Representatives, from New York. He has been a supporter of Khalistan and Nagalim. Towns also wanted to "declare India a terrorist state" because of "the pattern of Indian terrorism against its minorities", an allegation that was summarily dismissed by the White House.
- Jesse Helms, former five-term Republican U.S. Senator from North Carolina. About two decades ago, he had circumvented the State Department's refusal of a visa to separatist Khalistan activist Jagjit Singh Chauhan by inviting him to testify before a Senate agriculture committee he headed.

== Legislative activities ==
In 1997, HR 182, the Human Rights in India Act, was sponsored by Rep. Dan Burton (R-IN) and Rep. Gary Condit (D-CA). to cut-off U.S. development aid to India until the president certifies to Congress that India has taken "certain steps to prevent human rights abuses" in India. Another resolution, H. Con. Res. 37, sponsored by Condit and Rep. Dana Rohrabacher (R-CA) called for an internationally supervised plebiscite in Punjab on the question of independence for the region. The act secured the support of only 82 members while 342 voted against it. Dr. Aulakh was involved in these legislations.

== Opposition by India and Indian Groups ==
In one case, Dr. Aulakh faced accusations of obtaining signatures by deception in 2002 from US House Foreign Policy Aides when a publication on US Congress, The Hill stated that a legislative assistant to a Republican Congressman misled her office by implying to a staff member that the Congressman, John Shimkus, had agreed to sign a letter to the President calling for release of political prisoners in India.

The Senior legislative assistant stated that Dr. Aulakh had already printed the letter with the name of the Congressman leaving a staff member to assume that the office had agreed to sign it. The same publication also quoted one aide with ties to the 131-member Congressional India Caucus as saying that Dr. Aulakh had been getting away with tricking staffers into signing letters for several years.

== Later years ==
He died on 21 June 2017, at his home in Washington, DC. He was survived by his wife Charnjit Kaur Sandhu and three adult children: Artinder Kaur Aulakh, Urminder Singh Aulakh and Bikramjit Singh Aulakh.
