= List of pro-Khalistan movement organisations =

The Khalistan Movement is a separatist movement seeking to establish a homeland for Sikhs by establishing a sovereign Sikh state called Khalistan (Note: Punjabi: ਖ਼ਾਲਿਸਤਾਨ, lit. ''Land of the Khalsa''; It is also commonly known as Sikhistan from the 1940s–1970s) in the Punjab region (Note: while the movement claims the "Punjab region," the focus is almost exclusively on Indian Punjab. Most modern proponents do not claim territory from the Punjab province of Pakistan, despite it being the historical seat of the Sikh Empire.) of the Indian subcontinent. The proposed boundaries of Khalistan vary among different groups, but typically include the Sikh-majority Indian state of Punjab and potentially Punjabi-speaking areas of neighboring states of Himachal Pradesh, Haryana and Rajasthan. While its roots trace back to the 1947 Partition of British India, (Note: Before 1947, the seeds of the movement were sown during the twilight of British rule as the Lahore Resolution of 1940 made the creation of Pakistan look increasingly likely. Fearing that the Sikh community would be left as a permanent minority in either a Muslim-majority Pakistan or a Hindu-majority India, leaders like Master Tara Singh and the Shiromani Akali Dal began advocating for Azad Punjab or an independent Sikhistan. They argued that if India were to be divided on a religious basis, the Sikhs, as a third distinct community with a history of sovereign rule under Maharaja Ranjit Singh, should also have the right to a self-governed homeland to protect their unique cultural and religious Identity. However, the movement failed to establish Sikh homeland primarily due to the lack of a clear demographic majority in any single district and the tragic geographic bisection of the Sikh heartland by the Radcliffe Line. Ultimately, the Sikh leadership chose to join India after receiving assurances from Jawaharlal Nehru and the Congress Party that the community would enjoy an 'autonomous region' where they could 'feel the glow of freedom', a promise that remains a central point of contention in modern Sikh politics.") it gained significant momentum in the 1970s with the Anandpur Sahib Resolution, which initially sought greater regional autonomy. The movement escalated into a violent insurgency in the 1980s following Operation Blue Star and the 1984 Sikh massacre, events that deeply affected the Sikh psyche. Today, while active militancy in India has largely subsided, the movement is sustained primarily by advocacy groups within the Sikh diaspora. Organizations like Sikhs for Justice continue to lobby for a sovereign state through non-binding Khalistan Referendum.

== Pro-Khalistan separatist organisations ==
1. Akali Dal (Waris Punjab De)
2. All India Sikh Students Federation
3. Council of Khalistan
4. Dal Khalsa
5. Shiromani Akali Dal (Amritsar)
6. Sikh Federation (UK)
7. Sikhs for Justice
8. Waris Punjab De
9. World Sikh Organization
10. Akal Federation
11. Akali Dal
12. All India Shiromani Akali Dal
13. Anandpur Khalsa Fouj (AKF)
14. Australian Sikh Council
15. Azad Khalistan
16. Bhindranwale Militant Group
17. California Sikh Youth Alliance
18. Jagtar Singh Hawara Committee
19. Kesri Lehar
20. Khalistan Affairs Center
21. Khalistan Armed Force
22. Khalistan Caucus Foundation
23. Khalistan Center
24. Khalistan Guerrilla Force
25. Khalistan Liberation Front
26. Khalistan Liberation Organisation
27. Khalistan National Army
28. Khalistan Security Force
29. Khalsa Party
30. Lashkar-e-Khalsa
31. Malwa Kesri Commando Force
32. National Sikh Youth Federation (UK)
33. Panch Pardhani Jatha
34. Panthic Committee
35. Panth Punjab
36. Punjab Sovereignty Alliance
37. Pure Tigers
38. Royal Army of Khalistan
39. Sher-e-Punjab Brigade
40. Shiromani Akali Dal, Amritsar (USA)
41. Sikh Assembly of America
42. Sikh Federation International
43. Sikh Federation of Canada
44. Sikh International Organization
45. Sikh Youth Federation
46. Sikh Youth Federation Bhindranwale
47. Sikh Youth of Punjab
48. Sikh Youth (UK)
49. Tat Khalsa
50. World Sikh Parliament

== Pro-Khalistan paramilitary organisations ==
Sr. No.	Name	Founder + year	Famous Actions
1.	Babbar Khalsa	Bhai Talwinder Singh Parmar, Bhai Sukhdev Singh Babbar (1979)	See: List of actions by Babbar Khalsa
2.	Bhindranwale Tiger Force of Khalistan	Baba Gurbachan Singh Manochahal (1984)	Major encounter at Rataul village.
3.	Dashmesh Regiment	Bhai Seetal Singh Matewal, (1990)	Major encounter at Bolowali village.
4.	International Sikh Youth Federation	Singh Sahib Jasbir Singh Rode, (23 September 1984)	based in the United Kingdom
5.	Khalistan Commando Force	Manbir Singh Chaheru, (1986)	Assassination of Rtd Chief General of Indian army and an architect of Operation Blue Star Arun Vaidya, assassinations of leading culprits of 1984 Anti-Sikh riots Congress(I) Member of Parliament Lalit Maken, Arjan Dass and several other high-profile battles with Indian security forces.
6.	Khalistan Liberation Army	1990s	The Khalistan Liberation Army (KLA) is reputed to have been a wing of, or possibly a breakaway group from, the KLF.
7.	Khalistan Liberation Force	Bhai Aroor Singh (1986)	Killing of SSP Gobind Ram, SSP A.S Brar, SP K.R.S Gill, Lt. Col. Satnam Singh, Ramkat Jatola, SP RS Tiwara, DSP Tara Chand, Major General B.N Kumar, Treasurer Balwant Singh, Lala Bhagwan Das, MLA Sat Pal Parashar, and others
8.	Khalistan Tiger Force	Jagtar Singh Tara (1990s)	Assassination of the former Chief Minister of Punjab Beant Singh in 1995.
9.	Khalistan Zindabad Force	Bhai Ranjit Singh Neeta	Bomb blasts on trains and buses in Jammu, killing of DSP Devinder Sharma.
10.	Shaheed Khalsa Force	1997	SKF claimed credit for marketplace bombings in New Delhi in 1997.

Babbar Khalsa is listed as a terrorist organisation by the United Kingdom, the EU, Canada, India, and the United States.

== See also ==
- Kharku
- Khalistan movement
- Insurgency in Punjab

== Bibliography ==
- Fair, C. Christine (2005), "Diaspora Involvement in Insurgencies: Insights from the Khalistan and Tamil Eelam Movements", Nationalism and Ethnic Politics, 11: 125–156, doi:10.1080/13537110590927845, S2CID 145552863
