= Council of Khalistan =

American non-profit organization

Council of Khalistan ਖ਼ਾਲਿਸਤਾਨ ਕੌਂਸਲ (Punjabi) Khalistan Kaunsal
- Flag Emblem
- Motto: ਅਕਾਲ ਸਹਾਇ (Punjabi); Akal Sahai "With God's Grace"
- Anthem: ਦੇਗ ਤੇਗ਼ ਫ਼ਤਿਹ (Punjabi); Deg Teg Fateh "Victory to Charity and Arms"
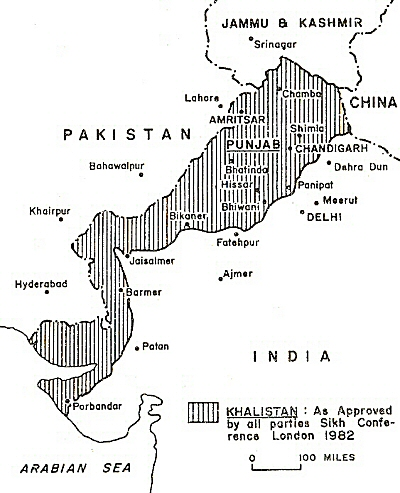
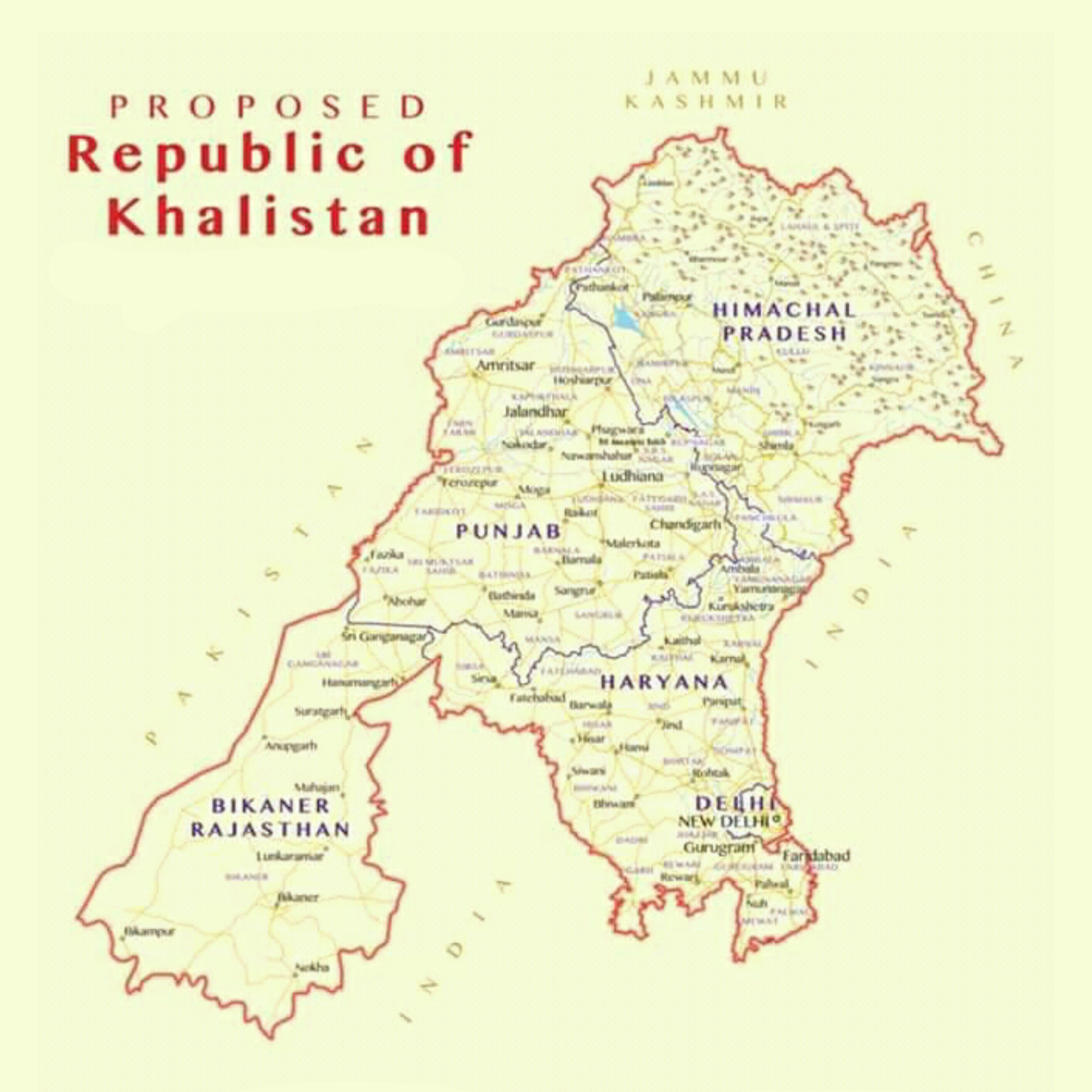
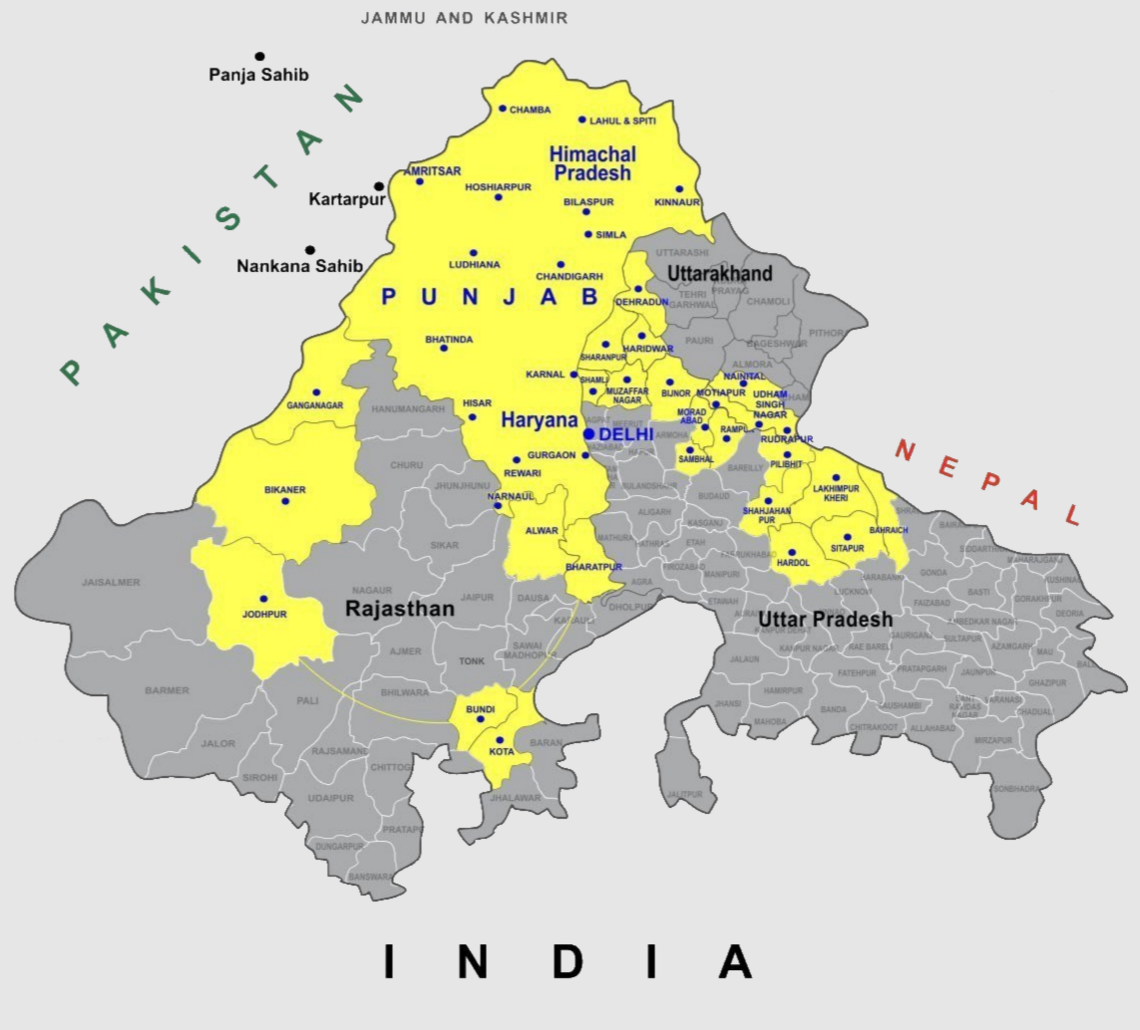
- Status: Former government-in-exile
- Capital-in-exile: London
- Headquarters: Khalistan House, London, England
- Official language: Punjabi
- Religion: Sikhism
- Demonym: Khalistani
- Government: Presidential republic
  - President: Jagjit Singh Chohan
  - Secretary General: Balbir Singh Sandhu
- Legislature: Cabinet
- Establishment: 1980
  - Formation of the Council of Khalistan: 12 April 1980
  - Formation of the government‐in‐exile: 13 June 1984
  - Abolition of the government‐in‐exile: mid–1990s
- Currency: Khalistan dollar
- Time zone: UTC+0 (GMT)
- Date format: dd-mm-yyyy

The Council of Khalistan is a non‐profit political organization based in Washington, D.C., United States. It is seeking to create a homeland for Sikhs by establishing a sovereign Sikh state called Khalistan. The Council of Khalistan is one of the key fighting forces of the Khalistan movement. It played an important role during the Insurgency in Punjab. Bakhshish Singh is its current president.

On 13 June 1984, after Operation Blue Star Khalistani separatists formed a government-in-exile in London to advocate for a separate Sikh state on the international stage. On 24 January 1993, It was admitted to the UNPO, as a representative organization of Khalistan but within few months it was suspended from UNPO due to strong diplomatic pressure from the Indian government and group's alleged association with violence, and this suspension was made permanent on 22 January 1995. Throughout this period, the relations between the Khalistan government-in-exile and the British government remained tense, As a result, the Council of Khalistan had to move its headquarters from London to Washington, D.C. in the mid-1990s, during this period the Khalistan government-in-exile was also abolished.

Today the Council of Khalistan is active in the United States and advocating for the independence of Khalistan, In collaboration with the Sikhs for Justice, it is organising a Khalistan Referendum to made a consensus among diasporic Sikhs for the creation of an independent sovereign Sikh state.

== History ==
The organization was created On 12 April 1980, when separatist leader Jagjit Singh Chohan officially announced the formation of the Council of Khalistan at Anandpur Sahib and declared himself to be the president. Balbir Singh Sindhu as its Secretary-General. Chohan presented himself as the president of the Republic of Khalistan, set up a cabinet, and issued Khalistani passports, stamps, and currency. On 13 June 1984, Chohan announced a government in exile.

The Cabinet of the Council of Khalistan was elected at a large meeting of several thousand Sikhs on 23 June 1984 in Southall, west London. And the meeting severely criticized Akali Dal leader Giani Amolak Singh and his associates who had led the Punjab autonomy campaign from 1981; all of them were forced to retire. The Akali Dal was swept aside by the new organization, the Council of Khalistan. Dr. Jagjit Singh Chohan, long ostracized for his idea of a separate Sikh homeland, was given support and a free hand to lead it. The council announced its other four members: Gurmej Singh of the Babbar Khalsa, Sewa Singh of the Akhand Kirtani Jatha, Karamjit Singh representing the youth, and Harmander Singh from the reorganized Akali Dal. A business- man offered an office in central London, appropriately named Khalistan House, where several volunteers undertook the campaign amid meetings and enquiries. The council's appeal for funds was given a generous response, and within two months its funds reached £100,000.

The community's turmoil was under close watch by the Indian authorities. As the BBC broadcast a short statement from Dr. Chohan, regarding the consequences of sacrilege committed by the Indian prime minister through attacking the Golden Temple, a major diplomatic row erupted. It was the first of many fissures to run through Indo-British relations, which were thought to be progressively worsening due to the Sikh factor.

On 24 January 1993, It was briefly admitted in the UNPO, as a representative organization of Khalistan, but was suspended in just a few months.

== List of presidents ==
The president of the Council of Khalistan is the leader and head of the organization. The title was created in 1980 when Jagjit Singh Chohan declared himself to be the president. There have been three presidents of Council of Khalistan since the post was established.

S. No.	Name	Portrait	Term start	Term end	Time in office	Ref.
1.	Jagjit Singh Chohan		12 April 1980	7 October 1987	7 years, 178 days	
2.	Gurmit Singh Aulakh		7 October 1987	21 June 2017	29 years, 257 days	
3.	Bakhshish Singh Sandhu		7 October 2017	Incumbent	8 years, 121 days	

== See also ==
- Insurgency in Punjab
- Khalistan movement
- Khalistan Referendum
