= Jagjit Singh Chohan =

Sikh separatist leader (1929–2007)

1st President of the Council of Khalistan
- In office 12 April 1980 – 7 October 1987
- Preceded by: Position established
- Succeeded by: Gurmit Singh Aulakh

Member of Punjab Legislative Assembly
- In office 8 March 1967 – 22 August 1968
- Constituency: Tanda

Deputy speaker of Punjab Legislative Assembly
- In office 27 March 1967 – 27 November 1967
- Preceded by: Shanno Devi
- Succeeded by: Baldev Singh

Minister of Finance, Punjab
- In office 25 November 1967 – 22 August 1968

President of Khalsa Raj Party
- In office 2 August 2002 – 4 April 2007
- Preceded by: Position established
- Succeeded by: Position abolished

Personal details
- Born: 1929 Urmar Tanda, Punjab, British India
- Died: 4 April 2007 (aged 77–78) Urmar Tanda, Punjab, India
- Occupation: Activist; Politician

Jagjit Singh Chohan (1929 – 4 April 2007) was an Indian political activist who was a leader of the Sikh Khalistan movement that sought to create a sovereign Sikh state in the Punjab region of the Indian subcontinent. Chohan established the Council of Khalistan at Anandpur Sahib on 12 April 1980 and became its first self‐styled president.

== Politics ==
Jagjit Singh grew up in Tanda in Punjab's Hoshiarpur district, about 180 km from Chandigarh into a Sikh family. He was active in the Communist Party of India as a student and became a dentist. Chohan was first elected to the Punjab Assembly from the Tanda as a candidate of the Republican Party of India in 1967. He became Deputy Speaker when the Akali Dal-led coalition Government took office in Punjab. When Lachhman Singh Gill became Chief Minister, Chohan was made Finance Minister. In 1969, he lost the Assembly election.

== Activity overseas ==
Two years after losing the Punjab Assembly elections in 1969, Chohan moved to the United Kingdom to start his campaign for creation of Khalistan. In 1971, he went to Nankana Sahib in Pakistan to attempt to set up a Sikh government. Chohan was invited by Pakistani army dictator Yahya Khan and was proclaimed as a Sikh leader. Certain Sikh relics that were in Pakistan were handed down to him and taken to UK. The relics had helped Chohan to gather Sikh supporters and followers. He then visited the United States at the invitation of his supporters among the Sikh diaspora.

On 13 October 1971, he paid for an ad in the New York Times claiming an Independent Sikh state. Advertisement of Khalistan enabled him to collect millions of dollars from the Sikh diaspora.

In later part of 1970s, Chohan was in touch with the Pakistani diplomatic mission in Pakistan with objective of encouraging Sikh youths to travel to Pakistan for pilgrimage and indoctrination for separatist propaganda.

On 12 April 1980, he declared the formation of a "National Council of Khalistan", at Anandpur Sahib. He declared himself the President of the Council and Balbir Singh Sandhu as its Secretary General.

In 1977, he returned to India. Chohan travelled to Britain in 1979, and established the Khalistan National Council.

In May 1980, Jagjit Singh Chohan travelled to London and announced the formation of Khalistan. A similar announcement was made by Balbir Singh Sandhu, in Amritsar, who released stamps and currency of Khalistan. Operating from a building termed "Khalistan House", he remained in contact with the Sikh leader Jarnail Singh Bhindranwale who was campaigning for a Sikh theocratic homeland. Chohan also maintained contacts among various groups in Canada, the US, and Germany. He visited Pakistan as a guest of leaders like Chaudhuri Zahoor Elahi. Chohan declared himself president of the "Republic of Khalistan", named a Cabinet, and issued symbolic Khalistan "passports", "postage stamps", and "Khalistan dollars".

It is reported that with the assistance of a wealthy Californian supporter, a peach magnate, he opened an Ecuadorian bank account to support his operation.

== Operation Blue Star and later ==
In June 1983, Bhindranwale was asked: "If Jagjit Singh Chohan attacks India with assistance from England, America, and Canada, whom will you help?" Bhindranwale hedged and did not indicate his support.

On 12 June 1984, in London Chohan was interviewed by BBC. The interviewer asked: "Do you actually want to see the downfall of Indira Gandhi's Government?" Chohan answered: "..within a few days you will have the news that Mrs Gandhi and her family have been beheaded. That is what Sikhs will do..". After this interview, the Thatcher government curtailed Chohan's activities.

On 13 June 1984, Chohan announced a government in exile. On 31 October 1984, Indira Gandhi was assassinated by her two Sikh bodyguards in revenge for Operation Blue Star.

Chohan visited Punjab in 1989 and hoisted the flag of Khalistan at a gurdwara in Anandpur Sahib. Chohan's Indian passport was cancelled on 24 April 1989. India protested when he was allowed to enter USA using the canceled passport. Vancouver fundamentalists Talwinder Singh Parmar and Surjan Singh Gill were at one time aligned with Chohan.

== Softening and return ==
Chohan gradually softened his stance. He supported India's attempts to defuse the tension by accepting surrenders by the militants. Other organizations, mainly in UK and North America, continue to work for a Khalistan. The Indian government first permitted his wife to return and after he was pardoned by the Atal Bihari Vajpayee's government, he was allowed to return to India in June 2001, after having been exiled for 21 years. The government decided to overlook his past activities.

After his return, in an interview Chohan said he would keep the Khalistan movement alive democratically and pointed out that he has always been against violence.

== Khalsa Raj Party ==
After Chohan returned to India, he started a political party in 2002 named the Khalsa Raj Party and became its president. The stated aim of the political party was to continue his campaign for Khalistan. Chohan could not attract the support from the new generation of Sikhs. The Pioneer (newspaper) stated that his party was a 'Letterhead organization'.

== Death ==
Chohan withdrew himself from the public life in his later years. He died on 4 April 2007, aged 78 due to heart attack at his native village Tanda in Hoshiarpur District of Punjab.

== See also ==
- Gurmit Singh Aulakh
