= SFK =

SFK may refer to:

- SFK (album), 2024 album (Slant Face Killah) by Conway the Machine
- Something for Kate, Australian rock band
- Siófok-Kiliti Airfield, Hungary (IATA code)
- Suffolk, county in England, Chapman code
- SFK Lyn, Norwegian sports club
- SFK 2000, women's football club from Sarajevo, Bosnia and Herzegovina
- SFK Varavīksne, Latvian football club, now FK 1625 Liepāja
- ŠFK Prenaks Jablonec, Slovak football team
- SFK Nová Ves nad Váhom, Slovak football team

== See also ==
- SKF (disambiguation)
