= SKF (disambiguation) =

SKF is a bearing and seal manufacturing company founded in Gothenburg, Sweden.

SKF may also refer to:

- Lackland Air Force Base (IATA and FAA LID codes), a US Air Force base in Texas
  - Kelly Field Annex (IATA and FAA LID codes), a US Air Force facility in Texas
- ŠKF Sereď, a Slovak football team
- Salman Khan Films, India
- Smith, Kline & French, pharmaceutical company, now part of GSK
- Shaheed Khalsa Force, a pro-Khalistan (Sikh separatist) militant group in India
