= Nancy Grewal =

Canadian influencer and activist (1981–2026)

- Born: Nancy Grewal; January 19, 1981; India
- Died: March 3, 2026 (aged 45); LaSalle, Ontario, Canada
- Cause of death: Stabbing
- Occupations: Influencer, activist

Nancy Grewal (January 19, 1981 – March 3, 2026) was an Indian-born Canadian activist and influencer. Grewal had worked professionally as a musician in India, then as a personal support worker after moving to Canada in 2018 and settling in Windsor, Ontario.

== Activism ==
Grewal had thousands of followers on YouTube and primarily created content in Punjabi.

She was Sikh and an outspoken opponent of violent extremists within the Khalistan separatist movement, which has substantial support among Sikhs in Canada. She was also critical of NDP leader Jagmeet Singh, and of the Indian government's interference in Canadian politics.

== Murder ==
On February 25, 2026, she spoke to the CBC about her concerns of "extremism within the Sikh separatist movement", and of numerous death threats that she had received as a result of her activism. Grewal said that she had received 40 death threats, and that her home had been attacked by an arsonist in November 2025. Following her death, the Ontario Provincial Police appealed to the public to help identify the arsonist who poured an accelerant on the front porch of Grewal's home in Windsor on November 8, 2025, based on surveillance video of the incident.

On Tuesday March 3, 2026, Grewal was stabbed to death at about 9:30 pm in LaSalle, Ontario, while leaving a home where she was working as a personal support worker. According to her sister, Grewal was "stabbed in the back, … and the puncture hit her lungs," and the patient at whose home she had been attending called emergency services.

The CBC reported that social media accounts linked to the Khalistan separatist movement posted claims of responsibility for Grewal's death, while San Grewal and Jesse Brown (both from small, independent media organizations) criticized the CBC's credulity in reporting this, noting their lack of sophisticated understanding of misinformation targeting the Indian diaspora and Canada in particular.

== See also ==
- Murder of Hardeep Singh Nijjar
