= Letterhead organization =

Public policy or other group lacking substantial active membership

In American politics, a letterhead organization (or letterhead group) is a public policy or other group lacking substantial active membership. In contrast to other civic organizations, letterhead organizations function through the issuance of public letters or other materials using names of notable persons (as on a "letterhead") to inherit their authority, rather than having authority based for example a large number of members.

The term has also been used in other countries, such as Canada, and dates back to before 1921. Before that, the term "paper organization", implying that an organization only existed on paper, was in common use. Blackwood's Edinburgh Magazine in 1876 referred to a proposed Army Corps as a "paper organisation" as not actually composed of men and equipment.

By 1972, the use of such organizations was becoming common. After Nixon was re-elected president in 1972, anti-McGovern Democrats founded the Coalition for a Democratic Majority (CDM), appointing as its director Penn Kemble. The CDM's letterhead listed "House Speaker-to-be Tom Foley, Ambassador-to-be Jeane Kirkpatrick, civil rights leaders Bayard Rustin, Velma and Norman Hill, the "boss"of Montgomery County Democratic politics Dick Schifter, Ambassador-to-be Peter Rosenblatt and Arms-Control Negotiator-to-be Max Kampelman"; the new organization placed full-page advertisements in The New York Times and The Washington Post. An initial contributor to the CDM was the Committee on Political Education of the AFL–CIO. "Letterhead organizations, I realized, could get ink for a point of view, and influence policy", wrote Ben Wattenberg in discussing Kemble and CDM. Later, Kemble used a similar strategy in founding the Institute for Religion and Democracy and other letterhead organizations.

== Pejorative use ==
The term "letterhead organization" has been used as a pejorative, to stress the small scale of the group or its alleged influence by virtue of its "letterhead members" rather than by its own activities. Some letterhead organizations have been alleged to have been motivated more by fundraising than by influencing policy or informing the public.

== Size compared with think tanks ==
A think tank generally has a substantial number of employees and supporters actively involved. Such groups may produce peer-reviewed and other journals, news releases, position papers, conferences, and the like.

== List of groups sometimes labeled as "letterhead organizations" ==
The following groups have been termed "letterhead organizations" by the reference (cited parenthetically):

- State chapters of The Moral Majority (Reichley)
- Project for a New American Century "The PNAC had a staff of only five. That did not matter: its purpose was to write embarrassing letters to important people. Its letter to President Clinton in February 1998 (signed by Wolfowitz, Rumsfeld, and Fukuyama), calling for the overthrow of Saddam Hussein, helped to bring about the Iraq Liberation Act... Ten years later, it is now a ‘letterhead’ organization, and functionally dead." (High, p. 488)
- Christians Concerned for Israel (later National Christian Leadership Conference for Israel)
- American Judicature Society
- Social Unit Institute
- National Defense Committee
- Khalsa Raj Party, started by Jagjit Singh Chohan.
