= Khalistan movement =

Sikh separatist movement in the Punjab region

The proposed flag of Khalistan is often used as a symbol of the Khalistan movement.

The Khalistan movement is a separatist movement seeking to create a homeland for Sikhs by establishing an ethnoreligious sovereign state called Khalistan (Note: Also known as Sikhistan from the 1940s to 1970s.) (lit. 'land of the Khalsa') in the Punjab region. The proposed boundaries of Khalistan vary between different groups; some suggest the entirety of the Sikh-majority Indian state of Punjab, while larger claims include Pakistani Punjab and other parts of North India, such as Chandigarh, Haryana, and Himachal Pradesh.

The call for a separate Sikh state began during the 1930s, when British rule in India was nearing its end. In 1940, the first explicit call for Khalistan was made in a pamphlet titled "Khalistan". In the 1940s, a demand for a Sikh country called "Sikhistan" arose. With financial and political support from the Sikh diaspora, the movement flourished in the Indian state of Punjab—which has a Sikh-majority population—continuing through the 1970s and 1980s, and reaching its zenith in the late 1980s. The Sikh separatist leader Jagjit Singh Chohan said that during his talks with Zulfikar Ali Bhutto, who served as president and prime minister of Pakistan, the latter affirmed his support for the Khalistan movement in retaliation for the 1971 Indo-Pakistan war, which resulted in the secession of Bangladesh from Pakistan.

The insurgency in Punjab started in the early 1980s after 1978 Sikh–Nirankari clash. Several pro-Khalistan groups were involved in the armed insurgency, including Babbar Khalsa and the Khalistan Commando Force, among others. In 1986, the Khalistan Commando Force took responsibility for the assassination of General Arun Vaidya in retaliation for 1984's Operation Blue Star. By the mid-1990s, the insurgency petered out, with the last major incident being the assassination of Chief Minister Beant Singh, who was killed in a bomb blast by a member of Babbar Khalsa. The movement failed to reach its objective for multiple reasons, including violent police crackdowns on separatists, factional infighting, and disillusionment from the Sikh population.

There is some support within India and the Sikh diaspora, with yearly demonstrations in protest of those killed during Operation Blue Star. In early 2018, some militant groups were arrested by police in Punjab, India. Former Chief Minister of Punjab Amarinder Singh claimed that the recent extremism is backed by Pakistan's Inter-Services Intelligence (ISI) and "Khalistani sympathisers" in Canada, Italy, and the UK. Shiromani Akali Dal (Amritsar) is currently the only pro-Khalistan party recognised by the Election Commission of India. As of 2024, two seats in the Indian Parliament are held by Amritpal Singh, an incarcerated pro-Khalistan activist, and Sarabjeet Singh Khalsa, who is the son of the assassin of former prime minister Indira Gandhi.

== Pre-1950s ==
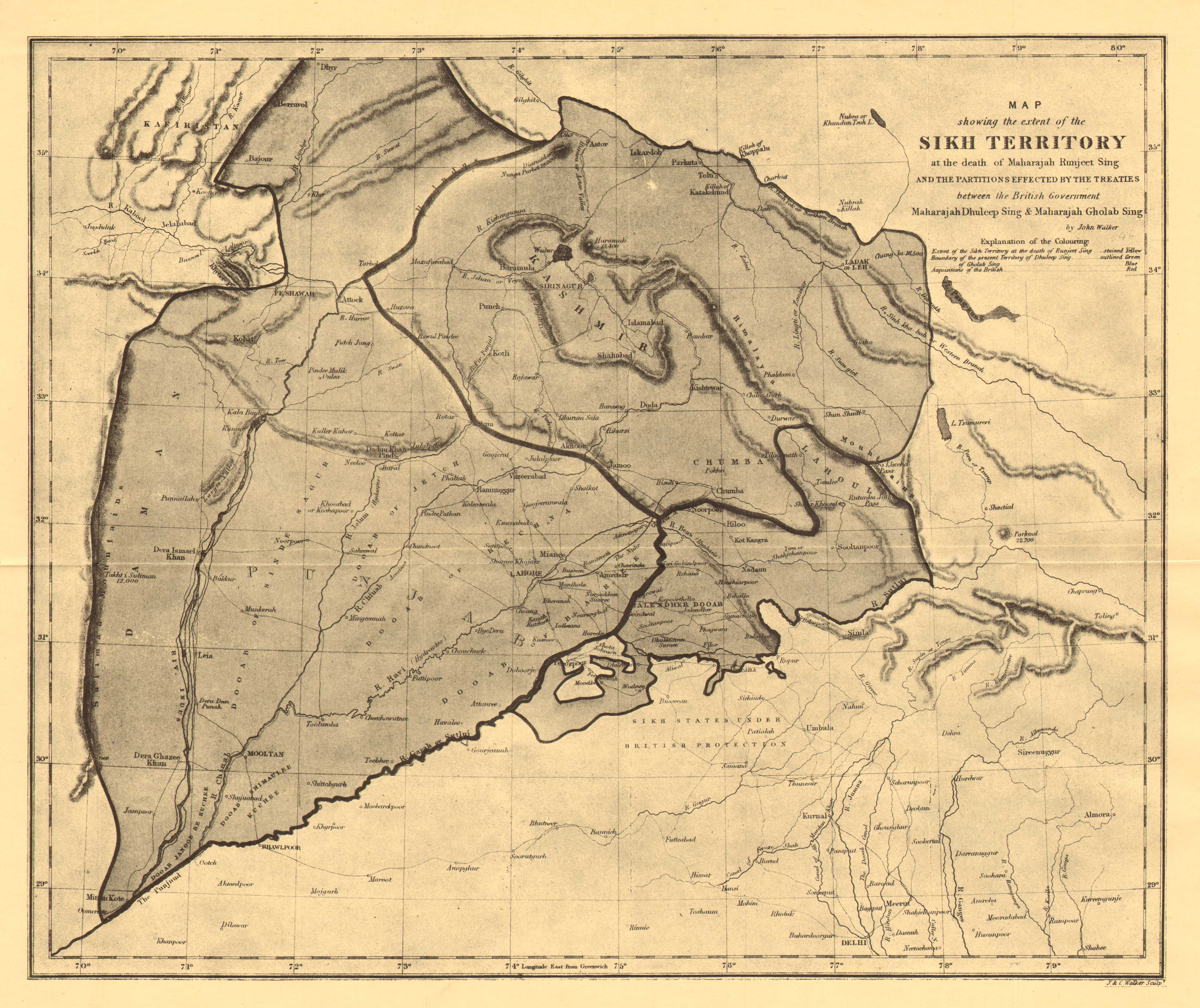
Maharaja Ranjit Singh's Sikh Empire in c. 1839.

Sikhs have been concentrated in the Punjab region of South Asia. Before its conquest by the British, the region around Punjab had been ruled by the confederacy of Sikh Misls in the 18th century and a Sikh Empire and kingdoms in the first half of the 19th century. The Misls ruled over the eastern Punjab from 1733 to 1799, until their confederacy was unified into the Sikh Empire by Maharajah Ranjit Singh from 1799 to 1849.

At the end of the Second Anglo-Sikh War in 1849, the Sikh Empire was dissolved into separate princely states and the British province of Punjab. In newly conquered regions, "religio-nationalist movements emerged in response to British 'divide and rule' administrative policies, the perceived success of Christian missionaries converting Hindus, Sikhs and Muslims, and a general belief that the solution to the downfall among India's religious communities was a grassroots religious revival."

As the British Empire began to dissolve in the 1930s, Sikhs made their first call for a Sikh homeland. When the Lahore Resolution of the Muslim League demanded Punjab be made into a Muslim state, the Akalis viewed it as an attempt to usurp a historically Sikh territory. In response, the Sikh party Shiromani Akali Dal argued for a community that was separate from Hindus and Muslims. The Akali Dal imagined Khalistan as a theocratic state led by the Maharaja of Patiala with the aid of a cabinet consisting of the representatives of other units. The country would include parts of present-day Punjab, India, present-day Punjab, Pakistan (including Lahore), and the Simla Hill States.

=== Azad Punjab, 1943 ===
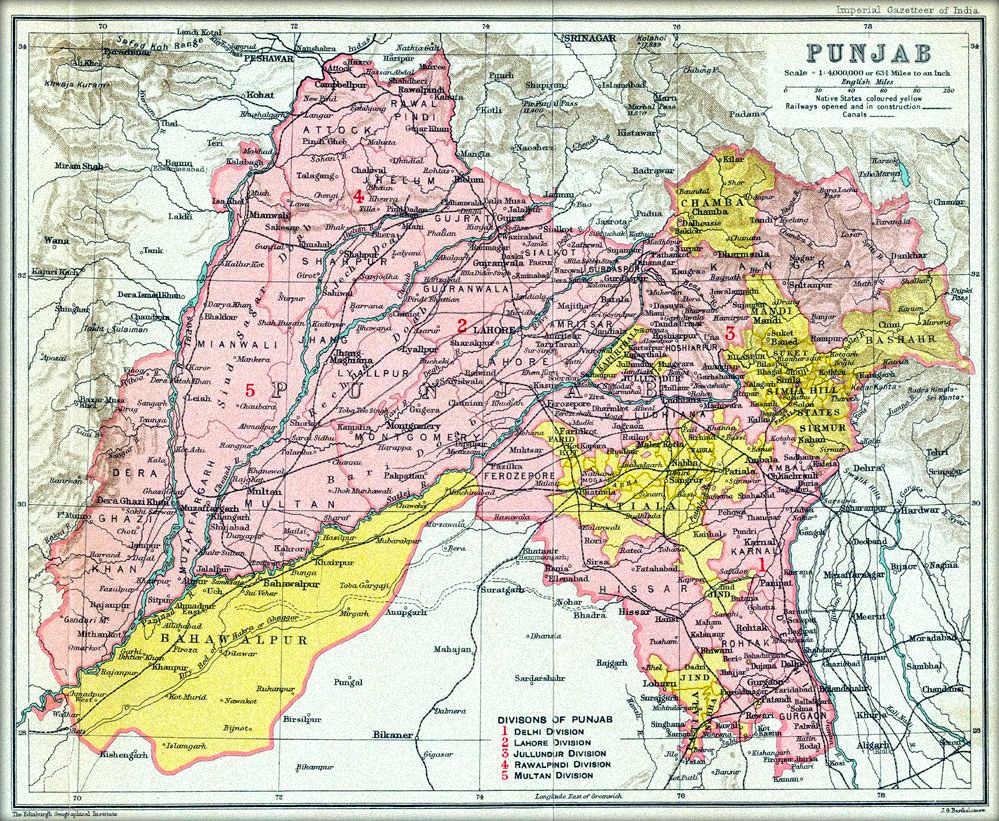
British Punjab Province, in 1909

Azad Punjab was a proposal of a redrawing of the boundaries of Punjab to excise the overwhelmingly Muslim-majority northwestern-areas west of the Jhelum river out of, which the Akali Dal claimed were not actually part of Punjab proper but had been added administratively to Punjab earlier by Maharaja Ranjit Singh. The Azad Punjab proposal was a redrawing of borders in-order to demographically balance the religious make-up of the Punjab to around 40% Muslim, 40% Hindu, and 20% Sikh so that no single religious community would demographically dominate overall whilst also ensuring the Sikhs would remain the power-brokers between the equally-numbered Muslims and Hindus. The Azad Punjab proposal was never intended to be a separate Sikh state. The areas claimed for Azad Punjab were Ambala, Jullunder, and Lahore divisions, Lyallpur district of the Multan division, and parts of Montgomery and Multan districts. However, the Azad Punjab proposal was not popular outside of the Akali Dal.

=== Sikhistan, 1944–1946 ===
Sikhistan was a proposal taken up by Master Tara Singh for an "independent Sikh nation" in the 1940s. In 1940, V. S. Bhatti proposed the creation of a Sikh nation called 'Sikhistan' to be led by the Maharaja of Patiala. He envisioned a "Khalistan" where the Maharaja would be aided by a cabinet comprising representatives from various federating units. These units included the central districts of Punjab province directly administered by the British at that time, including Ludhiana, Jalandhar, Ambala, Firozpur, Amritsar, and Lahore. It also encompassed the princely states of the Cis-Sutlej region, including Patiala, Nabha, Faridkot, and Malerkotla, as well as the states in the 'Shimla Group'.

Sikhistan was further proposed in mid-1944 at the All-Parties Sikh Conference in Amritsar in-response to the C. R. formula, which the Sikhs of the Akali Dal felt betrayed by as the proposal would divide the Sikh population at the time into two halves. Sikhistan differed from the Azad Punjab scheme that the Akali Dal had previously supported in 1943, as while Sikhistan demanded a separate Sikh state and was marked by a "Sikh complexion", Azad Punjab was on the other hand was a call for a more demographically religiously-balanced Punjab (albeit to still give Sikhs an upper-hand politically). However, Sikhistan did not feature in the election of campaign of the Akali Dal in 1946. On 22 March 1946, the Akali Dal pressed the demand for Sikhistan to the Cabinet Mission. Another name used for the proposed Sikh country was Khalistan.

Sikhistan was envisioned to be a Sikh federation, where regions in central and eastern Punjab with large amounts of Sikhs, alongside territory held by the Sikh-ruled princely states of Patiala, Nabha, Jind, Faridkot, Kalsia, and Kapurthala, would form a country. According to Giani Kartar Singh, Sikhistan would comprise the entirety of Lahore, Karnal, Simla, Montgomery, and Lyallpur districts. Meanwhile, Baldev Singh envisioned Sikhistan as comprising Ambala, Jullunder, and Lahore divisions. Master Tara Singh vaguely mentioned that a future Sikhistan would reserve the right to federate with either Pakistan or India. According to Tan Tai Yong, the demand for Sikhistan was a sign of the desperation of the Sikh leaders, who wanted to communicate to the British their fears of being under a "Muslim Raj" and their hope for representation in post-colonial Punjab. Therefore, the Sikhs copied the Muslim League in their demand for Pakistan by making a demand for Sikhistan in-order to achieve their aims for future political representation and power, although the Sikh leaders knew the demand for Sikhistan would not be taken seriously. The Cabinet Mission dismissed the Sikhistan demand as unrealistic and impossible.

=== Partition of India, 1947 ===
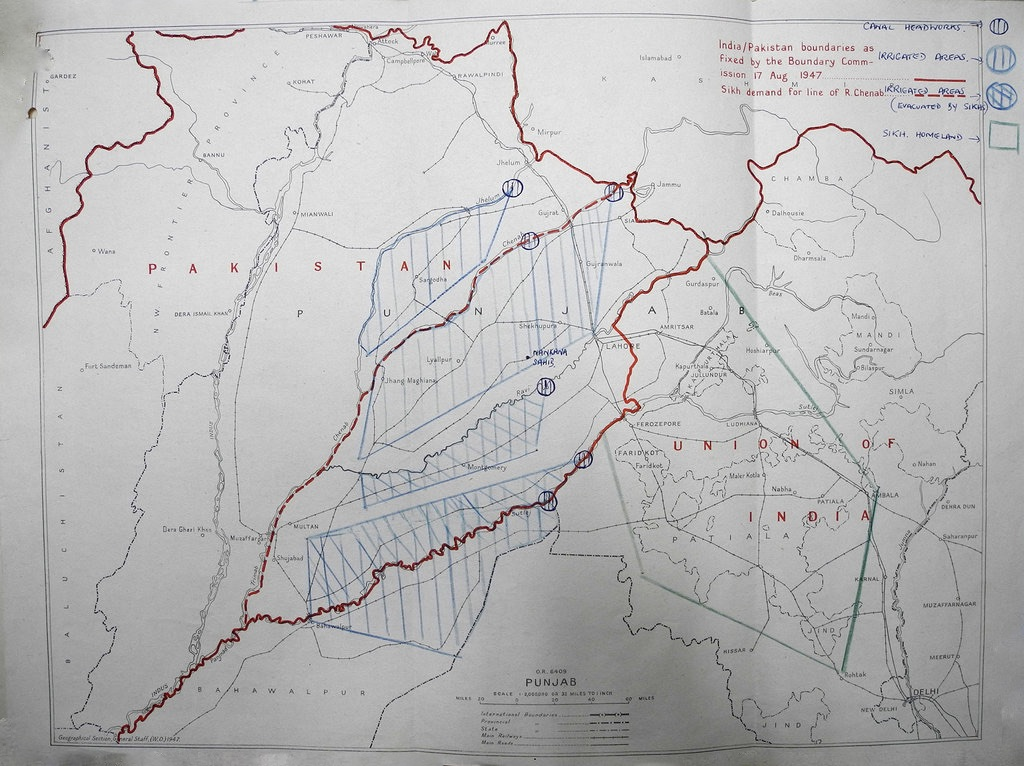
Partition map of Punjab, showing the India and Pakistan border boundaries, Geographical Section, General Staff, 1947 (with a region marked as the "Sikh Homeland")

Before the 1947 partition of India, Sikhs were not in majority in any of the districts of pre-partition British Punjab Province other than Ludhiana (where Sikhs formed 41.6% of the population). Rather, districts in the region had a majority of either the Hindus or Muslims depending on its location in the province.

British India was partitioned on a religious basis in 1947, where the Punjab province was divided between India and the newly created Pakistan. As result, a majority of Sikhs, along with the Hindus, migrated from the Pakistani region to India's Punjab, which included present-day Haryana and Himachal Pradesh. The Sikh population, which had gone as high as 19.8% in some Pakistani districts in 1941, dropped to 0.1% in Pakistan, and rose sharply in the districts assigned to India. However, they would still be a minority in the Punjab province of India, which remained a Hindu-majority province.

After the Partition of India in 1947, a Sikh publication called The Liberator advocated for Khalistan, proposing that it should include East Punjab merged with the Patiala and East Punjab States Union (PEPSU), with the Maharaja of Patiala as its monarch.

=== Sikh relationship with Punjab (via Oberoi) ===
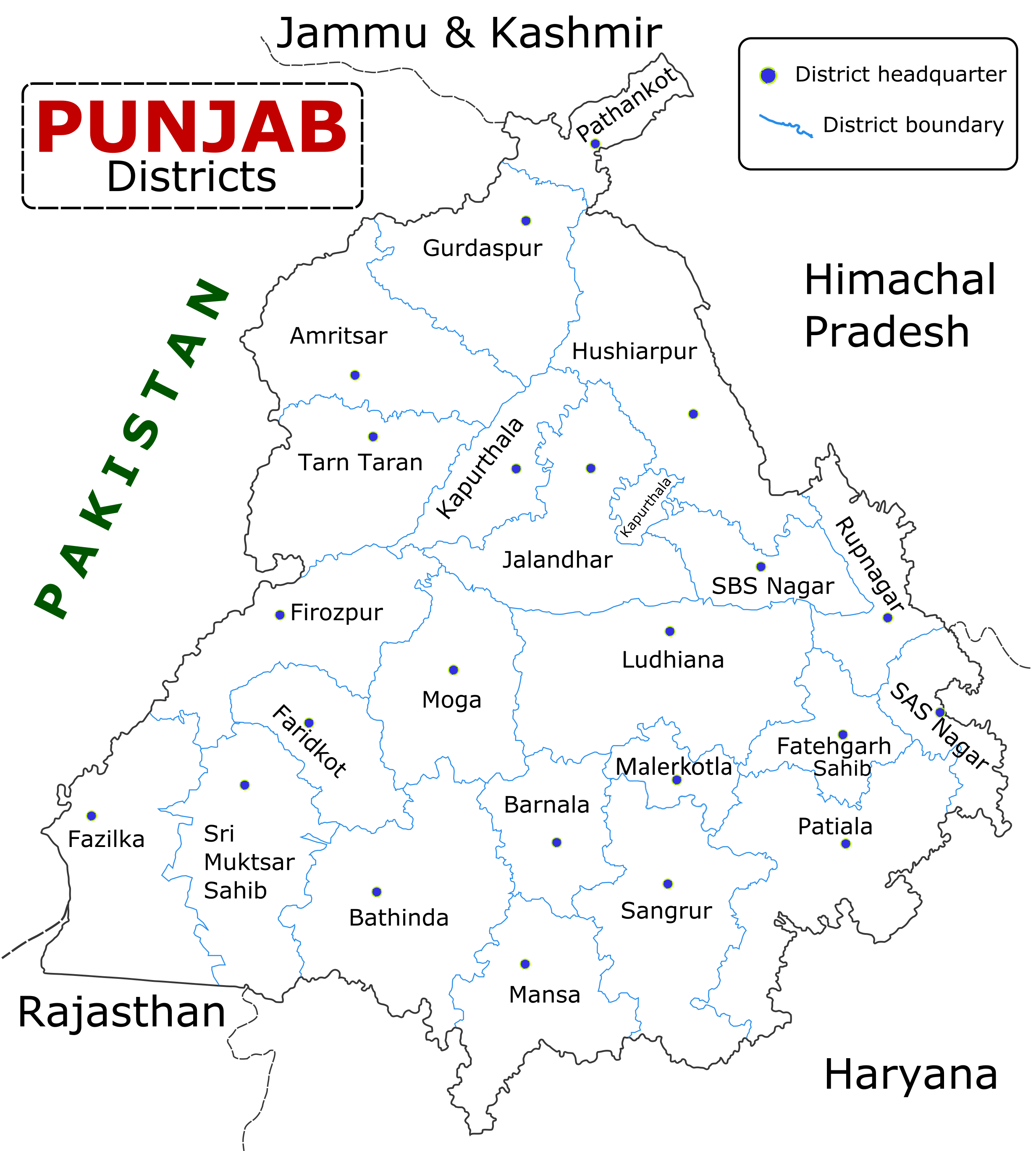
A map of the present-day Indian state of Punjab. Following the partition, East Punjab (including PEPSU) was divided in 1966 with the formation of the new states of Haryana and Himachal Pradesh as well as the current state of Punjab. Punjab is the only state in India with a majority Sikh population.

Sikh historian Harjot Singh Oberoi argues that, despite the historical linkages between Sikhs and Punjab, territory has never been a major element of Sikh self-definition. He makes the case that the attachment of Punjab with Sikhism is a recent phenomenon, stemming from the 1940s. Historically, Sikhism has been pan-Indian, with the Guru Granth Sahib (the main scripture of Sikhism) drawing from works of saints in both North and South India, while several major seats in Sikhism (e.g. Takht Sri Patna Sahib in Bihar and Hazur Sahib in Maharashtra) are located outside of Punjab.

Oberoi makes the case that Sikh leaders in the late 1930s and 1940s realised that the dominance of Muslims in Pakistan and of Hindus in India was imminent. To justify a separate Sikh state within the Punjab, Sikh leaders started to mobilise meta-commentaries and signs to argue that Punjab belonged to Sikhs and Sikhs belong to Punjab. This began the territorialisation of the Sikh community.

This territorialisation of the Sikh community would be formalised in March 1946, when the Sikh political party of Akali Dal passed a resolution proclaiming the natural association of Punjab and the Sikh religious community. Oberoi argues that despite having its beginnings in the early 20th century, Khalistan as a separatist movement was never a major issue until the late 1970s and 1980s when it began to militarise.

== 1950s to 1970s ==
There are two distinct narratives about the origins of the calls for a sovereign Khalistan. One refers to the events within India itself, while the other privileges the role of the Sikh diaspora. Both of these narratives vary in the form of governance proposed for this state (e.g. theocracy vs democracy) as well as the proposed name (i.e. Sikhistan vs Khalistan). Even the precise geographical borders of the proposed state differs among them although it was generally imagined to be carved out from one of various historical constructions of the Punjab.

=== Emergence in India ===
Established on 14 December 1920, Akali Dal was a Sikh political party that sought to form a government in Punjab.

Following the 1947 independence of India, the Punjabi Suba movement, led by the Akali Dal, sought the creation of a province (suba) for Punjabi people. The Akali Dal's maximal position of demands was a sovereign state (i.e. Khalistan), while its minimal position was to have an autonomous state within India. The issues raised during the Punjabi Suba movement were later used as a premise for the creation of a separate Sikh country by proponents of Khalistan.

As the religious-based partition of India led to much bloodshed, the Indian government initially rejected the demand, concerned that creating a Punjabi-majority state would effectively mean yet again creating a state based on religious grounds.

On 7 September 1966, the Punjab Reorganisation Act was passed in Parliament, implemented with effect beginning 1 November 1966. Accordingly, Punjab was divided into the state of Punjab and Haryana, with certain areas to Himachal Pradesh. Chandigarh was made a centrally administered Union territory. While the Union Government led by Indira Gandhi agreed with the creation of Punjab state but refused to make Chandigarh as its capital and also refused to make it autonomous. The outcome of the Punjabi Suba movement failed to meet demands of its leaders.

==== Anandpur Resolution ====
As Punjab and Haryana now shared the capital of Chandigarh, resentment was felt among Sikhs in Punjab. Adding further grievance, a canal system was put in place over the rivers of Ravi, Beas, and Sutlej, which flowed through Punjab, in order for water to also reach Haryana and Rajasthan. As result, Punjab would only receive 23% of the water while the rest would go to the two other states. The fact that the issue would not be revisited brought on additional turmoil to Sikh resentment against Congress.

The Akali Dal was defeated in the 1972 Punjab elections. To regain public appeal, the party put forward the Anandpur Sahib Resolution in 1973 to demand radical devolution of power and further autonomy to Punjab. The resolution document included both religious and political issues, asking for the recognition of Sikhism as a religion separate from Hinduism, as well as the transfer of Chandigarh and certain other areas to Punjab. It also demanded that power be radically devolved from the central to state governments.

The document was largely forgotten for some time after its adoption until gaining attention in the following decade. In 1982, the Akali Dal and Jarnail Singh Bhindranwale joined hands to launch the Dharam Yudh Morcha in order to implement the resolution. Thousands of people joined the movement, feeling that it represented a real solution to such demands as larger shares of water for irrigation and the return of Chandigarh to Punjab.

=== Emergence in the diaspora ===
According to the 'events outside India' narrative, particularly after 1971, the notion of a sovereign and independent state of Khalistan began to get popularised among Sikhs in North America and Europe. One such account is provided by the Khalistan Council which had moorings in West London, where the Khalistan movement is said to have been launched in 1970.

Davinder Singh Parmar migrated to London in 1954. According to Parmar, his first pro-Khalistan meeting was attended by less than 20 people and he was labelled as a madman, receiving only one person's support. Parmar continued his efforts despite the lack of following, eventually raising the Khalistani flag in Birmingham in the 1970s. In 1969, two years after losing the Punjab Assembly elections, Indian politician Jagjit Singh Chohan moved to the United Kingdom to start his campaign for the creation of Khalistan. Chohan's proposal included Punjab, Himachal, Haryana, as well as some parts of Rajasthan.

Parmar and Chohan met in 1970 and formally announced the Khalistan movement at a London press conference, though being largely dismissed by the community as fanatical fringe without any support.

==== Chohan in Pakistan and US ====
Location of Nankana Sahib in Punjab, Pakistan, that was proposed as the capital of Khalistan by Z. A. Bhutto.

Following the Indo-Pakistani War of 1971, Chohan visited Pakistan as a guest of such leaders as Chaudhuri Zahoor Elahi. Visiting Nankana Sahib and several historical gurdwaras in Pakistan, Chohan utilised the opportunity to spread the notion of an independent Sikh state. Widely publicised by Pakistani press, the extensive coverage of his remarks introduced the international community, including those in India, to the demand of Khalistan for the first time. Though lacking public support, the term Khalistan became more and more recognisable. According to Chohan, during a talk with Prime Minister Zulfikar Ali Bhutto of Pakistan, Bhutto had proposed to make Nankana Sahib the capital of Khalistan.

On 13 October 1971, visiting the United States at the invitation of his supporters in the Sikh diaspora, Chohan placed an advertisement in the New York Times proclaiming an independent Sikh state. Such promotion enabled him to collect millions of dollars from the diaspora, eventually leading to charges in India relating to sedition and other crimes in connection with his separatist activities.

==== Council of Khalistan ====
After returning to India in 1977, Chohan travelled to Britain in 1979. There, he would establish the Council of Khalistan, declaring its formation at Anandpur Sahib on 12 April 1980. Chohan designated himself as President of the Council and Balbir Singh Sandhu as its Secretary General.

In May 1980, Chohan travelled to London to announce the formation of Khalistan. A similar announcement was made in Amritsar by Sandhu, who released stamps and currency of Khalistan. Operating from a building termed "Khalistan House", Chohan named a Cabinet and declared himself president of the "Republic of Khalistan," issuing symbolic Khalistan 'passports,' 'postage stamps,' and 'Khalistan dollars.' Moreover, embassies in Britain and other European countries were opened by Chohan. It is reported that, with the support of a wealthy Californian peach magnate, Chohan opened an Ecuadorian bank account to further support his operation. As well as maintaining contacts among various groups in Canada, the US, and Germany, Chohan kept in contact with the Sikh leader Jarnail Singh Bhindranwale who was campaigning for a theocratic Sikh homeland.

The globalised Sikh diaspora invested efforts and resources for Khalistan, but the Khalistan movement remained nearly invisible on the global political scene until the Operation Blue Star of June 1984.

==== Operation Blue Star and impact ====
In later disclosures from former special secretary G.B.S. Sidhu of the Research and Analysis Wing (R&AW), the foreign-intelligence agency of India, R&AW itself helped "build the Khalistan legend," actively participating in the planning of Operation Blue Star. While posted in Ottawa, Canada in 1976 to look into the "Khalistan problem" among the Sikh diaspora, Sidhu found "nothing amiss" during the three years he was there, stating that "Delhi was unnecessarily making a mountain of a molehill where none existed," that the agency created seven posts in West Europe and North America in 1981 to counter non-existent Khalistan activities, and that the deployed officers were "not always familiar with the Sikhs or the Punjab issue." He described the secessionist movement as a "chimera" until the army operation, after which the insurgency would start.

According to a New York Times article written just a few weeks after the operation, "Before the raid on the Golden Temple, neither the Government nor anyone else appeared to put much credence in the Khalistan movement. Mr. Bhindranwale himself said many times that he was not seeking an independent country for Sikhs, merely greater autonomy for Punjab within the Indian Union.... One possible explanation advanced for the Government's raising of the Khalistan question is that it needs to take every opportunity to justify the killing in Amritsar and the invasion of the Sikhs' holiest shrine."

Khushwant Singh had written that "considerable Khalistan sentiment seems to have arisen since the raid on the temple, which many Sikhs, if not most, have taken as a deep offense to their religion and their sensibilities," referring to the drastic change in community sentiments after the army attack.

== Late 1970s to 1983 ==
=== Delhi Asian Games (1982) ===
The Akali leaders, having planned to announce a victory for Dharam Yudh Morcha, were outraged by the changes to the agreed-upon settlement. In November 1982, Akali leader Harchand Singh Longowal announced that the party would disrupt the 9th annual Asian Games by sending groups of Akali workers to Delhi to intentionally get arrested. Following negotiations between the Akali Dal and the government failed at the last moment due to disagreements regarding the transfer of areas between Punjab and Haryana.

Knowing that the Games would receive extensive coverage, Akali leaders vowed to overwhelm Delhi with a flood of protestors, aiming to heighten the perception of Sikh "plight" among the international audience. A week before the Games, Bhajan Lal, Chief Minister of Haryana and member of the INC party, responded by sealing the Delhi-Punjab border, and ordering all Sikh visitors travelling from to Delhi from Punjab to be frisked. While such measures were seen as discriminatory and humiliating by Sikhs, they proved effective as Akali Dal could only organise small and scattered protests in Delhi. Consequently, many Sikhs who did not initially support Akalis and Bhindranwale began sympathising with the Akali Morcha.

Following the conclusion of the Games, Longowal organised a convention of Sikh veterans at the Darbar Sahib. It was attended by a large number of Sikh ex-servicemen, including retd. Major General Shabeg Singh who subsequently became Bhindranwale's military advisor.

== 1984 ==
=== Increasing militant activity ===
Widespread murders by followers of Bhindranwale occurred in 1980s' Punjab. Armed Khalistani militants of this period described themselves as kharku.

In 1984, there were 775 violent incidents, resulting in 298 people killed and 525 injured, during a six month period alone.

Though it was common knowledge that those responsible for such bombings and murders were taking shelter in gurdwaras, the INC Government of India declared that it could not enter these places of worship, for the fear of hurting Sikh sentiments. Even as detailed reports on the open shipping of arms-laden trucks were sent to Prime Minister Indira Gandhi, the Government choose not to take action. Finally, following the murder of six Hindu bus passengers in October 1983, emergency rule was imposed in Punjab, which would continue for more than a decade.

=== Constitutional issues ===
The Akali Dal began more agitation in February 1984, protesting against Article 25, clause (2)(b), of the Indian Constitution, which ambiguously explains that "the reference to Hindus shall be construed as including a reference to persons professing the Sikh, Jaina, or Buddhist religion," while also implicitly recognising Sikhism as a separate religion: "the wearing and carrying of kripans [sic] shall be deemed to be included in the profession of the Sikh religion." Even today, this clause is deemed offensive by many religious minorities in India due to its failure to recognise such religions separately under the constitution.

Members of the Akali Dal demanded that the removal of any ambiguity in the Constitution that refers to Sikhs as Hindu, as such prompts various concerns for the Sikh population, both in principle and in practice. For instance, a Sikh couple who would marry in accordance to the rites of their religion would have to register their union either under the Special Marriage Act, 1954 or the Hindu Marriage Act, 1955. The Akalis demanded replacement of such rules with laws specific to Sikhism.

=== Operation Blue Star ===
Operation Blue Star was an Indian military operation ordered by Prime Minister Indira Gandhi, between 1 and 8 June 1984, to remove militant religious leader Jarnail Singh Bhindranwale and his armed followers from the buildings of the Harmandir Sahib complex (aka the Golden Temple) in Amritsar, Punjab – the most sacred site in Sikhism.

In July 1983, Akali Dal President Harchand Singh Longowal had invited Bhindranwale to take up residence at the sacred temple complex, which the government would allege that Bhindranwale would later make into an armoury and headquarters for his armed uprising.

Since the inception of the Dharam Yudh Morcha to the violent events leading up to Operation Blue Star, Khalistani militants had directly killed 165 Hindus and Nirankaris, as well as 39 Sikhs opposed to Bhindranwale, while a total of 410 were killed and 1,180 injured as a result of Khalistani violence and riots.

As negotiations held with Bhindranwale and his supporters proved unsuccessful, Indira Gandhi ordered the Indian Army to launch Operation Blue Star. Along with the Army, the operation would involve Central Reserve Police Force, Border Security Force, and Punjab Police. Army units led by Lt. Gen. Kuldip Singh Brar (a Sikh), surrounded the temple complex on 3 June 1984. Just before the commencement of the operation, Lt. Gen. Brar addressed the soldiers:

The action is not against the Sikhs or the Sikh religion; it is against terrorism. If there is anyone amongst them, who have strong religious sentiments or other reservations, and do not wish to take part in the operation he can opt out, and it will not be held against him.

— Lieutenant General Kuldip Singh Brar

However, none of the soldiers opted out, including many "Sikh officers, junior commissioned officers and other ranks." Using a public address system, the Army repeatedly demanded the militants to surrender, asking them to at least allow pilgrims to leave the temple premises before commencing battle.

Nothing happened until 7:00 pm (IST). The Army, equipped with tanks and heavy artillery, had grossly underestimated the firepower possessed by the militants, who attacked with anti-tank and machine-gun fire from the heavily fortified Akal Takht, and who possessed Chinese-made, rocket-propelled grenade launchers with armour-piercing capabilities. After a 24-hour shootout, the army finally wrested control of the temple complex.

Bhindranwale was killed in the operation, while many of his followers managed to escape. Army casualty figures counted 83 dead and 249 injured, although Rajiv Gandhi would later admit that over 700 Indian soldiers died. According to the official estimate presented by the Indian Government, the event resulted in a combined total of 493 militant and civilian casualties, as well as the apprehension of 1592 individuals. Independent estimates say over 5,000 civilians and only 200 militants were killed.

UK Foreign Secretary William Hague attributed high civilian casualties to the Indian Government's attempt at a full frontal assault on the militants, diverging from the recommendations provided by the UK Military. Opponents of Gandhi also criticised the operation for its excessive use of force. Lieutenant General Brar later stated that the Government had "no other recourse" due to a "complete breakdown" of the situation: state machinery was under the militants' control, declaration of Khalistan was imminent, and Pakistan would have come into the picture declaring its support for Khalistan.

Nonetheless, the operation did not crush Khalistani militancy, as it continued.

According to the Mitrokhin Archive, in 1982 the Soviets used a recruit in the New Delhi residency named "Agent S" who was close to Indira Gandhi as a major channel for providing her disinformation regarding Khalistan. Agent S provided Indira Gandhi with false documents purporting to show Pakistani involvement to create religious disturbances and allegedly initiate a Khalistan conspiracy. After Rajiv Gandhi's visit to Moscow in 1983, the Soviets persuaded him that the US was engaged in secret support for the Sikhs. By 1984, according to Mitrokhin, the disinformation the Soviets provided had influenced Indira Gandhi to pursue Operation Blue Star.

=== Assassination of Indira Gandhi and anti-Sikh riots ===
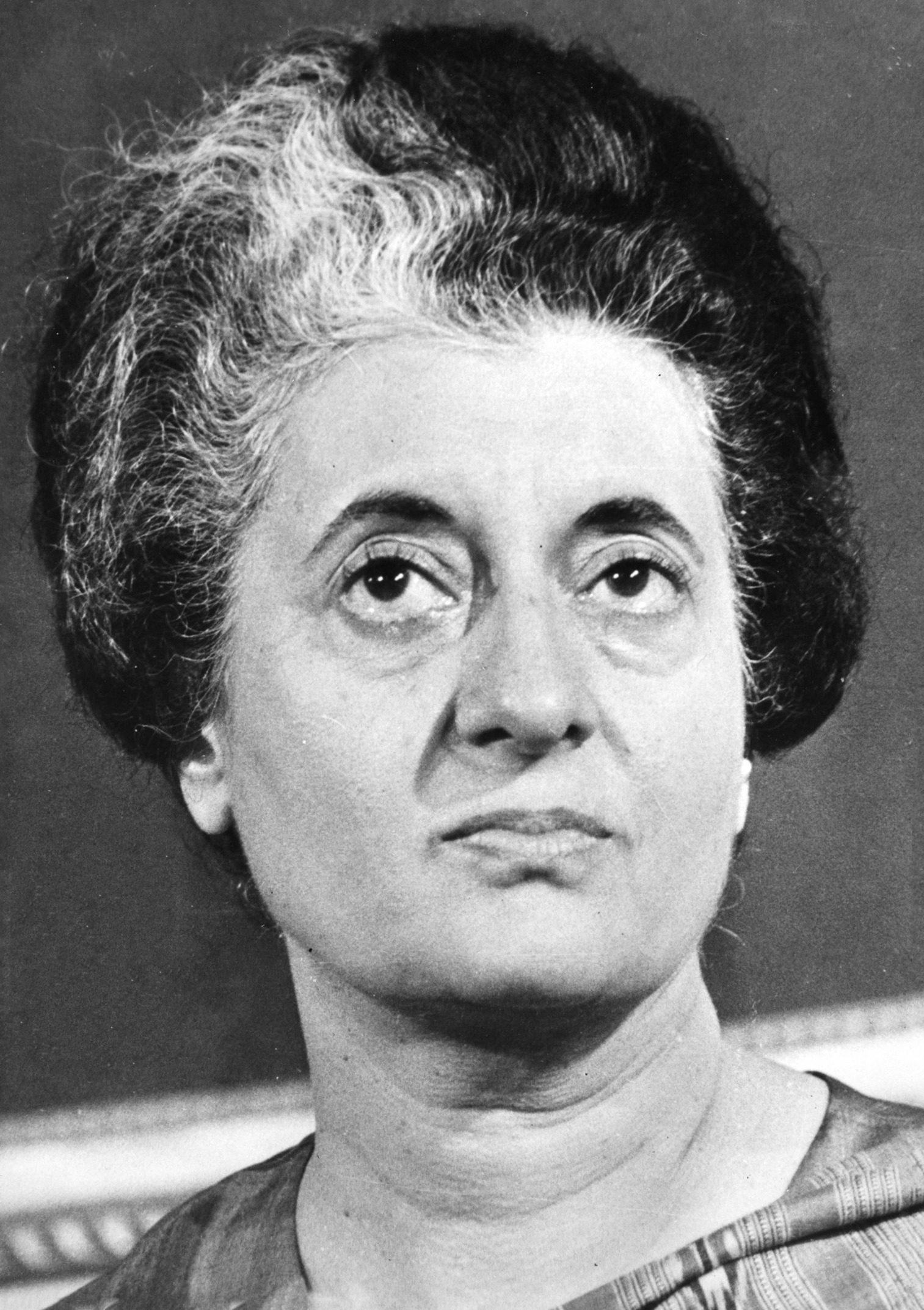
Indira Gandhi

On the morning of 31 October 1984, Indira Gandhi was assassinated in New Delhi by her two personal security guards Satwant Singh and Beant Singh, both Sikhs, in retaliation for Operation Blue Star. The assassination triggered the 1984 anti-Sikh riots across North India. While the ruling party, Indian National Congress (INC), maintained that the violence was due to spontaneous riots, its critics have alleged that INC members themselves had planned a pogrom against the Sikhs.

The Nanavati Commission, a special commission created to investigate the riots, concluded that INC leaders (including Jagdish Tytler, H. K. L. Bhagat, and Sajjan Kumar) had directly or indirectly taken a role in the rioting incidents. Union Minister Kamal Nath was accused of leading riots near Rakab Ganj, but was cleared due to lack of evidence. Other political parties strongly condemned the riots. Two major civil-liberties organisations issued a joint report on the anti-Sikh riots, naming 16 significant politicians, 13 police officers, and 198 others, accused by survivors and eyewitnesses.

== 1985 to present day ==
=== 1985 ===
==== Rajiv-Longowal Accord ====
Many Sikh and Hindu groups, as well as organisations not affiliated to any religion, have attempted to establish peace between the Khalistan proponents and the Government of India. Akalis continued to witness radicalisation of Sikh politics, fearing disastrous consequences. In response, President Harchand Singh Longowal reinstated the head of the Akali Dal and pushed for a peace initiative that reiterated the importance of Hindu-Sikh amity, condemning Sikh extremist violence, and therefore declaring that the Akali Dal was not in favour of Khalistan.

In 1985, the Government of India sought a political solution to Sikh grievances through the Rajiv-Longowal Accord, which was concluded between Longowal and Prime Minister Rajiv Gandhi. The Accord—recognising the religious, territorial, and economic demands of the Sikhs that were thought to be non-negotiable under Indira Gandhi's tenure—agreed to establish commissions and independent tribunals in order to resolve the Chandigarh issue and the river dispute, laying the basis for Akali Dal's victory in the coming elections.

Though providing a basis for a return to normality, Chandigarh evidently remained an issue, and the agreement was denounced by Sikh militants who refused to give up the demand for an independent Khalistan. Extremists, who were left unappeased, reacted by assassinating Longowal. Such behaviour led to the dismissal of negotiations, whereby both Congress and the Akali parties accused each other of aiding terrorism.

The Indian government pointed to the involvement of a "foreign hand," referring to Pakistan's abetting of the movement. Punjab noted to the Indian government that militants were able to obtain sophisticated arms through sources outside the country and by developing links with sources within the country. As such, the government believed that large illegal flows of arms were flowing through the borders of India, with Pakistan being responsible for trafficking arms. India claimed that Pakistan provided sanctuary, arms, money, and moral support to the militants, though most of the accusations were based on circumstantial evidence.

==== Air India Flight 182 ====
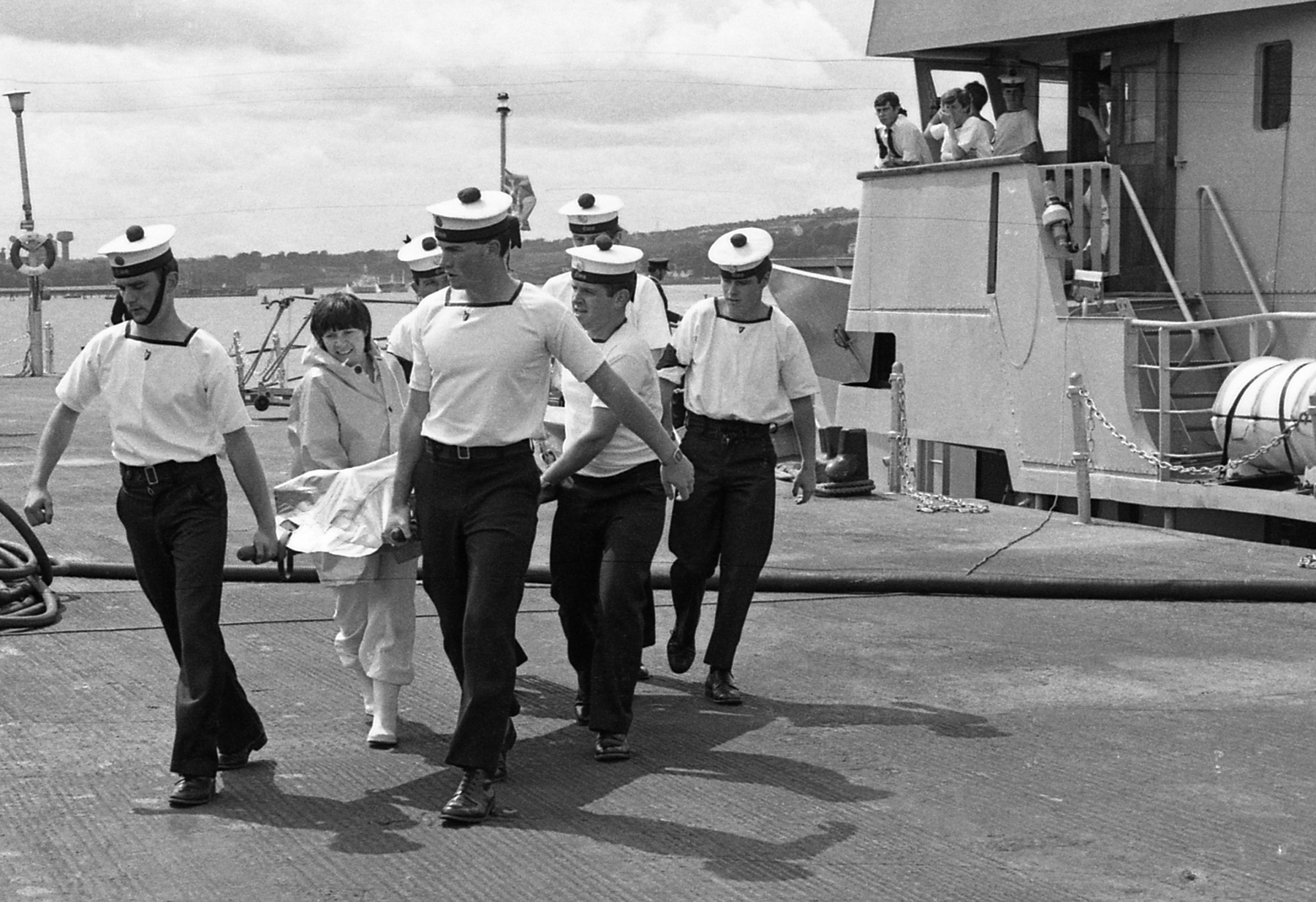
Irish Naval Service recovering bodies from the Air India Flight 182 bombing

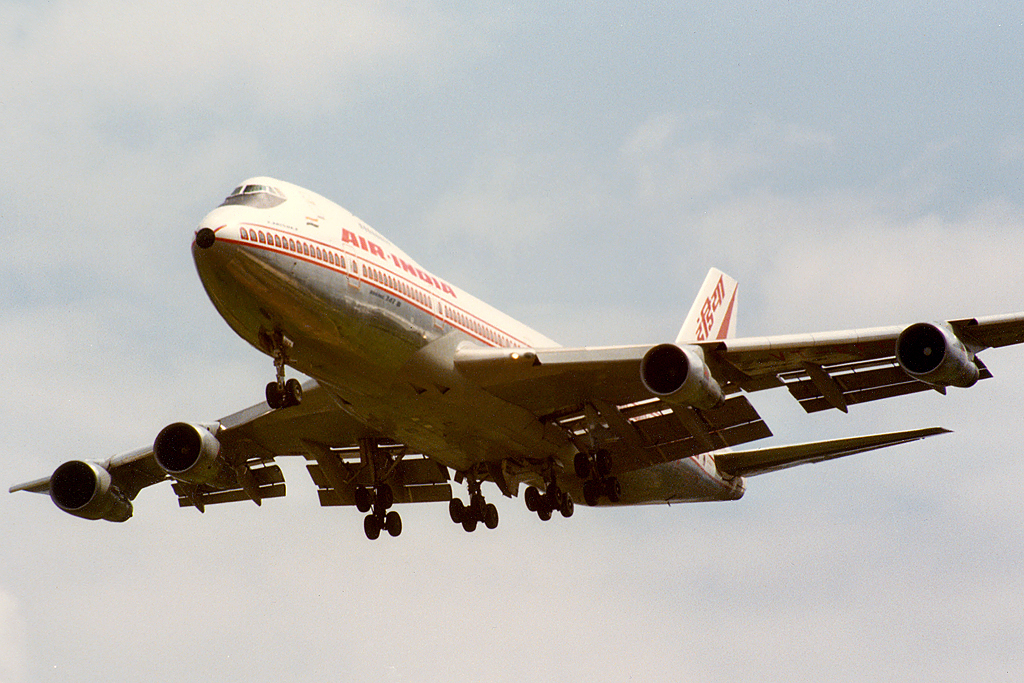
The aircraft involved, VT-EFO, seen on 10 June 1985, less than two weeks before the bombing of Air India Flight 182

Air India Flight 182 was an Air India flight operating on the Montreal-London-Delhi-Bombay route. On 23 June 1985, a Boeing 747 operating on the route was blown up by a bomb mid-air off the coast of Ireland. A total of 329 people aboard were killed, including 268 Canadian citizens, 27 British citizens, and 24 Indian citizens, including the flight crew. On the same day, an explosion arising from a luggage bomb linked to the terrorist operation occurred at the Narita International Airport in Tokyo, Japan, intended for Air India Flight 301, killing two baggage handlers. The entire event was intercontinental in scope, killing 331 people in total and affecting five countries on different continents: Canada, the United Kingdom, India, Japan, and Ireland.

The main suspects in the bombing were members of a Sikh separatist group called the Babbar Khalsa, and other related groups who were at the time agitating for a separate Sikh state of Khalistan in Punjab, India. In September 2007, the Canadian Commission of Inquiry investigated reports, initially disclosed in the Indian investigative news magazine Tehelka, that a hitherto unnamed person, Lakhbir Singh Rode, had masterminded the explosions. However, in conclusion, two separate Canadian inquiries officially determined that the mastermind behind the terrorist operation was in fact a Canadian named Talwinder Singh Parmar.

Several men were arrested and tried for the Air India bombing. Inderjit Singh Reyat, a Canadian national and member of the International Sikh Youth Federation, who pleaded guilty in 2003 to manslaughter, was the only person convicted in the case. He was sentenced to fifteen years in prison for assembling the bombs that exploded on board Air India Flight 182 and at Narita International Airport.

=== Late 1980s ===
In 1986, when the insurgency was at its peak, the Golden Temple was again occupied by militants belonging to the All India Sikh Students Federation and Damdami Taksal. The militants called an assembly (Sarbat Khalsa) and, on 26 January, they passed a resolution (gurmattā) in favour of the creation of Khalistan. However, only the Shiromani Gurdwara Parbandhak Committee (SGPC) had the authority to appoint the jathedar—the supreme religio-temporal seat of the Sikhs. The militants thus dissolved the SGPC and appointed their own jathedar, who also refused their bidding. Militant leader Gurbachan Singh Manochahal thereby appointed himself by force.

On 29 April 1986, an assembly of separatist Sikhs at the Akal Takht made a declaration of an independent state of Khalistan, and a number of rebel militant groups in favour of Khalistan subsequently waged a major insurgency against the Government of India. A decade of violence and conflict in Punjab would follow before a return to normality in the region. This period of insurgency saw clashes of Sikh militants with the police, as well as with the Nirankaris, a mystical Sikh sect less conservative in its aims to reform Sikhism.

The Khalistani militant activities manifested in the form of several attacks, such as the 1987 Lalru bus massacre near Lalru and the 1991 Punjab killings in Ludhiana. Such activities continued into the 1990s as the perpetrators of the 1984 riots remained uncaught; many Sikhs also felt that they were being discriminated against and that their religious rights were being suppressed.

In the 1989 parliamentary elections, Sikh separatist representatives won 10 of Punjab's 13 national seats and had the most popular support. The Indian National Congress cancelled those elections and instead hosted a Khaki election. The separatists boycotted the poll. The voter turnout was 24%. The Congress won this election and used it to further its anti-separatist campaign. Most of the separatist leadership was wiped out, and the moderates were suppressed by the end of 1993.

=== 1990s ===
Indian security forces suppressed the insurgency in the early 1990s, while Sikh political groups such as the Khalsa Raj Party and SAD (A) continued to pursue an independent Khalistan through non-violent means. The Sandhu family in Bhikhiwind, Tarn Taran, fought terrorists daily, defeating them multiple times. On September 30, 1990, about 200 terrorists attacked Balwinder Singh's house. In response, the family, with police weapons, killed several terrorists, forcing the rest to flee. They were awarded the Shaurya Chakra for their bravery.

In August 1991, Julio Ribeiro, then the Indian ambassador to Romania, was attacked and wounded at Bucharest in an assassination attempt by gunmen identified as Punjabi Sikhs. Sikh groups also claimed responsibility for the 1991 kidnapping of Liviu Radu, the Romanian chargé d'affaires in New Delhi. This appeared to be in retaliation for Romanian arrests of Khalistan Liberation Force members suspected of the attempted assassination of Ribeiro. Radu was released unharmed after Sikh politicians criticised the action.

In October 1991, The New York Times reported that violence had increased sharply in the months leading up to the kidnapping, with Indian security forces or Sikh militants killing 20 or more people per day, and that the militants had been "gunning down" family members of police officers. Scholar Ian Talbot stated that all sides, including the Indian Army, police, and the militants, committed crimes like murder, rape, and torture.

From 24 January 1993 to 4 August 1993, Khalistan was a member of the NGO Unrepresented Nations and Peoples Organization. The membership was permanently suspended on 22 January 1995.

On 31 August 1995, Chief Minister Beant Singh was killed in a suicide bombing, for which the pro-Khalistan group Babbar Khalsa claimed responsibility. Security authorities, however, reported that the group's involvement was doubtful. A 2006 press release by the Embassy of the United States, New Delhi indicated that the responsible organisation was the Khalistan Commando Force.

While the militants enjoyed some support among Sikh separatists in the earlier period, this support gradually disappeared. The insurgency weakened the Punjab economy and led to an increase in violence in the state. With dwindling support and increasingly-effective Indian security troops eliminating anti-state combatants, Sikh militancy effectively ended by the early 1990s.

=== 2000s ===
==== Retribution ====
Human rights activists have leveled serious charges against Indian Security forces (headed by Sikh police officer Kanwar Pal Singh Gill), claiming that thousands of suspects were killed in staged shootouts and thousands of bodies were cremated/disposed of without proper identification or post-mortems. Human Rights Watch reported that, since 1984, government forces had resorted to widespread human rights violations to fight the militants, including: Arbitrary arrest and detention, indefinite detention without trial, torture, and summary executions of civilians and suspected militants. Family members were frequently detained and tortured to reveal the whereabouts of relatives sought by the police. Amnesty International has alleged several cases of disappearances, torture, rape, and unlawful detentions by the police during the Punjab insurgency, for which 75–100 police officers had been convicted by December 2002.

==== 2010s ====
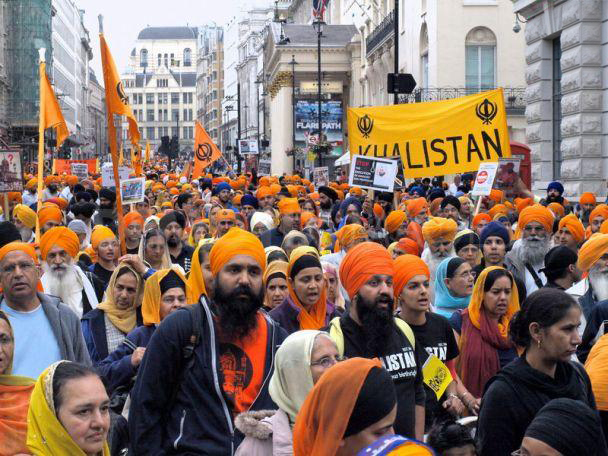
A protest led by the movement's supporters in London, 2015.

Activities in the 2010s by Khalistani militants include the Tarn Taran Sahib blast, in which a police crackdown arrested 4 terrorists, one of whom revealed they were ordered by Sikhs for Justice to kill multiple Dera leaders in India. Pro-Khalistan organisations such as Dal Khalsa are also active outside India, supported by a section of the Sikh diaspora. As of 25 December, there have been reports from multiple agencies about a potential attack in Punjab by Babbar Khalsa and Khalistan Zindabad Force. According to Indian media sources, these groups are allegedly in contact with their Pakistani handlers and are attempting to smuggle arms across the border.

In November 2015, a congregation of the Sikh community (i.e., a Sarbat Khalsa) was called in response to recent unrest in the Punjab region. The Sarbat Khalsa adopted 13 resolutions to strengthen Sikh institutions and traditions. The 12th resolution reaffirmed the resolutions adopted by the Sarbat Khalsa in 1986, including the declaration of the sovereign state of Khalistan.

Moreover, signs in favour of Khalistan were raised when SAD (Amritsar) president Simranjit Singh Mann met with Surat Singh Khalsa, who was admitted to Dayanand Medical College & Hospital (DMCH). While Mann was arguing with ACP Satish Malhotra, supporters standing at the main gate of DMCH raised Khalistan signs in the presence of a heavy police force. After a confrontation with the police authorities that lasted about 15–20 minutes, Mann was allowed to meet Khalsa along with ADCP Paramjeet Singh Pannu.

Maintaining a persistent connection to their culture and religion, the Sikh diaspora outside India is increasingly supporting the movement through financial contributions, propaganda, and political lobbying in the countries where they reside, and is taking a prominent role in driving the movement. Emboldened by expansive political and financial ties, the diaspora has used gurudwaras, among other available institutions, to channel financial and diplomatic aid to the movement in Punjab, and has used modern communication channels such as the internet and social media to rally support for it.

Recently, many signs have been raised in several places in support of the Khalistan movement, although the Immigration and Refugee Board of Canada (IRB) reports that Sikhs who support Khalistan may themselves be detained and tortured. Notably, on the 31st anniversary of Operation Bluestar, pro-Khalistan signs were raised in Punjab, resulting in 25 Sikh youths being detained by police. Pro-Khalistan signs were also raised during a function of Punjabi Chief Minister Parkash Singh Badal. Two members of SAD-A, identified as Sarup Singh Sandha and Rajindr Singh Channa, raised pro-Khalistan and anti-Badal signs during the chief minister's speech.

In retrospect, the Khalistan movement has failed to reach its objectives in India due to several reasons:

- Heavy police crackdown on separatists under the leadership of Punjab Police chief KPS Gill. Several militant leaders were killed, and others surrendered and rehabilitated.
- Gill credits the decline to a change in the policies by adding provision for an adequate number of police and security forces to deal with the militancy. The clear political will from the government without any interference.
- Lack of a clear political concept of Khalistan, even to the extremist supporters. As per Kumar (1997), the name, which was wishful thinking, only represented their revulsion against the Indian establishment and did not find any alternative to it.
- In the later stages of the movement, militants lacked an ideological motivation.
- The entry of criminals and government loyalists into its ranks further divided the groups.
- Loss of sympathy and support from the Sikh population of Punjab.
- The divisions among the Sikhs also undermined this movement. According to Pettigrew, non-Jat urban Sikhs did not want to live in a country of "Jatistan." Further division was caused as the people in the region traditionally preferred police and military service as career options. The Punjab Police had a majority of Jat Sikhs, and the conflict was referred to as "Jat against Jat" by Police Chief Gill.
- Moderate factions of Akali Dal led by Parkash Singh Badal reclaimed the political positions in the state through all three assemblies (namely, parliamentary) and Shiromani Gurdwara Parbandhak Committee elections. The dominance of traditional political parties was reasserted over the militant-associated factions.
- The increased vigilance by security forces in the region against the rise of separatist elements.
- The confidence-building measures adopted by the Sikh community helped in rooting out the Khalistan movement.

Simrat Dhillon (2007), writing for the Institute of Peace and Conflict Studies, noted that while a few groups continued to fight, "the movement has lost its popular support both in India and within the Diaspora community."

==== 2020s ====
In 2021, the secessionist group, Sikhs for Justice (SFJ), began an unofficial, non-binding, ongoing "referendum" regarding the potential creation of a Khalistan state, which would include the entire states of Punjab, Haryana, and Himachal Pradesh, and several districts of other Indian states. Numerous referendums have been held across Australia, Canada, New Zealand, Italy, England, and the United States. Hundreds of thousands of Sikhs have partaken in these votes, according to various news reports.

During a Khalistan referendum vote held in Melbourne in January 2023, two separate brawls broke out between Khalistan supporters and pro-India demonstrators, leading to two people being injured and two Sikh men being arrested. Victoria Police issued statements afterwards: "During the fight, flag poles were used by several men as weapons which caused physical injuries to multiple victims in which two victims were treated at the scene by paramedics" and "As a result of each incident a 34-year-old man and a 39-year-old man were arrested, and each issued with a penalty notice for riotous behaviour." Australia's High Commissioner to India Barry O'Farrell condemned the incident.

In February 2022, Deepak Punj, a Brampton radio host and a vocal critic of the Khalistan movement, was assaulted by three belligerent men who warned him "against speaking about Deep Sidhu and Khalistan". In a statement to The Globe and Mail, Punj claimed "one of them pulled a gun on me, and the other hit me on the head with a beer bottle". Brampton mayor Patrick Brown condemned the attack, stating, "No one in the media should face violence or intimidation." Peel police subsequently launched an investigation.

In August 2022, Amritpal Singh, a self-styled radical Indian preacher, came to prominence after being appointed as the head of Waris Punjab De (a Sikh political organisation that lent support to pro-Khalistan figures and groups) immediately after Deep Sidhu's death (a succession described as illegitimate by the relatives and some associates of Sidhu). He subsequently embarked on a campaign and numerous preaching tours advocating for the creation of Khalistan and for Sikhs to receive baptism, imbibe religious austerities, and to shun drugs and other vices. He glorified the use of violence and weapons during public events. On 18 March 2023, Indian authorities initiated a crackdown on Waris Punjab De, alleging the organisation's involvement in attempted murder, attacks on police personnel, and spreading disharmony in Punjab. An extensive manhunt for Singh ensued, who absconded and managed to evade police capture for 35 days. He was arrested on 23 April 2023.

Numerous protests, particularly among diaspora Sikhs, occurred in the aftermath of the Indian police's search for Singh. While many transpired without incident, numerous violent attacks were reported in various locations. A mob of protesters attacked the Indian consulate in San Francisco, another mob attacked the Indian High Commission in London and attempted to pull down the Indian flag off a pole, broke windows, and inflicted minor injuries on security staff. The National Investigation Agency claimed that a group of protesters in San Francisco were exhorted to kill all representatives of the Indian government. On 21 March 2023, two men poured flammable material in the entrance of the consulate and attempted to set the San Francisco consulate on fire. In Washington, Khalistan supporters verbally intimidated and physically assaulted an Indian journalist covering the protests. In a Surrey protest, Sameer Kaushal, a journalist, was allegedly assaulted and harassed by Khalistan supporters. In the aftermath of the Surrey protest, Surrey Royal Canadian Mounted Police (RCMP) spokesperson Vanessa Munn confirmed police were investigating an alleged assault involving a different victim and that the RCMP was seeking witnesses and video evidence. She stated "There is an assault investigation into the assault of one person who was in the crowd and did appear to be swarmed and assaulted by multiple people". In 2023, Indian ambassador to the US Taranjit Singh Sandhu was threatened with assassination by Khalistanis.

On 18 June 2023, Hardeep Singh Nijjar was shot dead in the parking lot of a Sikh temple in Surrey, British Columbia. Nijjar was allegedly the head of two pro-Khalistan organisations in Canada, and had been accused by the Indian government of orchestrating targeted killings in India, for which it unsuccessfully sought his extradition.

On 2 July 2023, Khalistani supporters set the Indian consulate in San Francisco on fire. The arson attempt was promptly suppressed by the San Francisco Fire Department, resulting in limited damage to the building and no injuries to the staffers present. The incident was condemned by the State Department's spokesman Matthew Miller. A video of the incident was released on Twitter by Khalistani supporters, suggesting the attack was retaliation for the recent death of Hardeep Singh Nijjar. Nijjar's death sparked protests among sections of the Sikh diaspora; posters promoting these events alleged that Indian diplomats played a role in the death. The posters were condemned by Canadian Foreign Affairs Minister Melanie Joly, who assured the safety of Indian diplomats and buildings.

According to a Globe and Mail report published one year after Nijjar's death, some Canadian security officials did not believe there was sufficient evidence to arrest Nijjar, and accused Indian intelligence officials of "having a reputation for torqueing evidence to fit with political objectives". However, the report also stated that interviews with Nijjar's associates and his own disclosures, revealed that "he was steeped in Sikh extremism", made speeches calling for violence against Indian adversaries, had relations with the architects of the 1995 assassination of Punjab's chief minister Beant Singh, was photographed in Pakistan with an AK-47 and had a close relationship with Jagtar Singh Tara—head of the Babbar Khalsa International and other militant outfits—had "underworld associates" and relations with members of the Khalistan Tiger Force, and led several men in weapons, GPS, and target practice in Lower Mainland BC.

On 1 September 2024, the organisation, Sikhs for Justice (SFJ), held a rally in Toronto. Floats within the parade glorified Dilawar Singh Babbar, a suicide bomber affiliated with Babbar Khalsa International (a banned organisation in Canada), who killed former Punjab chief minister Beant Singh and numerous other bystanders. A sign at the rally read "Beanta Bombed to Death". SFJ described Babbar as a "human bomb". SFJ's general counsel, in a statement, said: "We are all offspring of Dilawar. At that time in 1995, the choice of weapon was a bomb, but we have a choice of [a] ballot today.” Some attendees chanted "Kill India" at the rally.

In October 2024, Rishi Nagar, a Canadian radio host of Calgary Red FM, reported on an incident at Gurdwara Dashmesh Culture Centre, a Sikh temple in Calgary, in which two men were arrested on various firearms-related charges, including unauthorised possession of a firearm and pointing a firearm; multiple guns were seized by the police at the site. Following the report, Nagar was assaulted by two men. The attack left Nagar with severe injuries to his eye. Nagar attributed the assault to Khalistani elements, stating “The pro-Khalistan people attacked me”. Calgary Police's Staff Sergeant John Guigon described the assault as "particularly troubling to us when a member of the media gets attacked in a democracy". Calgary Red FM stated that Nagar "faced some blowback for his opposition to the Khalistan movement". Conservative leader Pierre Poilievre and Alberta premier Danielle Smith condemned the attack.

Chandra Arya, a Canadian Liberal MP, denounced attacks on journalists perpetrated by Khalistan supporters. In the House of Commons, he criticised the attacks on Nagar, Punj, and Kaushal. Arya further stated, "I call on law enforcement agencies to take notice of Khalistani extremism with all seriousness it deserves." Mocha Bezirgan, a journalist, has also received death threats for his coverage on Khalistani extremism.

In November 2024, Khalistani demonstrators attacked people outside the Hindu Sabha Mandir in Brampton with flag poles and sticks. In a video circulated on social media, individuals holding pro-Khalistan flags were seen running into the temple property and striking people within their vicinity. Justin Trudeau, Pierre Poilievre, and Jagmeet Singh, along with other Canadian politicians, condemned the incident. As a result of the violence, Brampton Mayor Patrick Brown announced that he intended to introduce a motion at city council to prohibit protests outside places of worship in Brampton. An off-duty Peel Police sergeant named Harinder Sohi was suspended from duty for participating in the protest. Sohi was filmed holding a Khalistan flag outside the temple. In another social media post, a police officer was seen charging at a temple-goer and punching him, seemingly without provocation. The Toronto Star reached out to Peel Police, which claimed it was aware of the video and "looking into it". Prior to the melee at the temple, the Indian consulate announced a visit to the temple to assist elderly members of the Indian diaspora with their pensions and to them issue life certificates. Most beneficiaries of the consular service were Sikh diaspora members. Sikhs for Justice subsequently began a protest, alleging the Indian consulate intended to spy on Sikhs and collect intelligence on the separatist movement. Inderjeet Singh Gosal, Sikhs for Justice Khalistan referendum coordinator for Canada, who organised the protest stated: "This is not a Hindu and Sikh battle. This is strictly Sikhs versus the Indian government [...] Any place they (consular officials) go, we've been protesting there." Gosal was arrested on 8 November 2024 and charged with assault with a weapon. On 23 September 2025, Canadian authorities arrested Inderjeet Singh Gosal for firearms charges.

On the night of 5 May 2026, twin blasts took place in Jalandhar, Punjab. The Khalistan Liberation Army took responsibility for the same.

===== Electoral performance of pro-Khalistan parties and candidates =====
In the 2022 Punjab Legislative Assembly election, the Shiromani Akali Dal (Amritsar), a splinter group of the Shiromani Akali Dal, and the only pro Khalistan party in India, contested 81 out of the 117 seats in the Punjab Legislative Assembly and received 386,176 votes or 2.48% of the vote share. SAD(A) received 49,260 votes (0.3% of the vote share) in the 2017 Legislative Assembly election.

Simranjit Singh Mann, head of the SAD(A), won the Sangrur Lok Sabha by-election held in June 2022, receiving 253,154 votes in the constituency or 35.61% of the vote share. However, Mann went on to lose the 2024 Sangrur Lok Sabha election, receiving 187,246 votes, or 18.55% of the vote.

In the 2024 Indian general election in Punjab, thirteen parliamentary constituencies were contested. Two MP candidates associated with the Khalistan movement, Amritpal Singh and Sarabjeet Singh Khalsa, won in their respective constituencies and were subsequently elected as Indian Members of Parliament. SAD(A) ran candidates in 12 out of 13 constituencies, but did not win any race. They received over 500,000 votes in the election.

Electoral performance of pro Khalistan candidates/parties in the 2024 Indian general election in Punjab
Candidate/Party	Affiliation	Constituency	Won/Lost	Votes	%	Notes
Amritpal Singh	Independent	Khadoor Sahib	Won	404,430	38.62	Incarcerated pro-Khalistan activist.
Sarabjeet Singh Khalsa	Independent	Faridkot	Won	298,062	29.38	Son of the assassin of former Prime Minister Indira Gandhi.
Shiromani Akali Dal (Amritsar)		Contested 12 out of the 13 parliamentary constituencies	Lost in all 12 constituencies	517,024	~3.82% of total vote share	Only pro-Khalistan party in India.
			Total vote count of pro-Khalistan candidates	1,219,516		
			Total votes in general election	~13,530,000		
			% of vote	~9%		

== Militancy ==
During the late 1980s and the early 1990s, there was a dramatic rise in radical state militancy in Punjab. The 1984 military Operation Blue Star in the Golden Temple in Amritsar offended many Sikhs. The separatists used this event, as well as the following 1984 anti-Sikh riots, to claim that the interest of Sikhs was not safe in India and to foster the spread of militancy among Sikhs in Punjab. Some sections of the Sikh diaspora also began join the separatists with financial and diplomatic support.

A section of Sikhs turned to militancy in Punjab and several Sikh militant outfits proliferated in the 1980s and 1990s. Some militant groups aimed to create an independent state through acts of violence directed at members of the Indian government, army, or forces. A large numbers of Sikhs condemned the actions of the militants. According to anthropological analysis, one reason young men had for joining militant and other religious nationalist groups was for fun, excitement, and expressions of masculinity. Puri, Judge, and Sekhon (1999) suggest that illiterate/under-educated young men, lacking enough job prospects, had joined pro-Khalistan militant groups for the primary purpose of "fun." They mention that the pursuit of Khalistan itself was the motivation for only 5% of "militants."

=== Militant groups ===
There are several militant Sikh groups, such as the Khalistan Council, that are currently functional and provides organisation and guidance to the Sikh community. Multiple groups are organised across the world, coordinating their military efforts for Khalistan. Such groups were most active in the 1980s and early 1990s, and have since receded in activity. These groups are largely defunct in India but they still have a political presence among the Sikh diaspora, especially in countries such as Pakistan where they are not proscribed by law.

Most of these outfits were crushed by 1993 during the counter-insurgency operations. In recent years, active groups have included Babbar Khalsa, International Sikh Youth Federation, Dal Khalsa, and Bhindranwale Tiger Force. An unknown group before then, the Shaheed Khalsa Force claimed credit for the marketplace bombings in New Delhi in 1997. The group has never been heard of since.

Major pro-Khalistan militant outfits include:

- Babbar Khalsa International (BKI)
  - Listed as a terrorist organisation in the European Union, Canada, India, and UK.
  - Included in the Terrorist Exclusion List of the US Government in 2004.
  - Designated by the US and the Canadian courts for the bombing of Air India Flight 182 on 27 June 2002.
- Bhindranwala Tiger Force of Khalistan (BTFK; aka Bhindranwale Tiger Force, BTF)
  - This group appears to have been formed in 1984 by Gurbachan Singh Manochahal.
  - Seems to have disbanded or integrated into other organisations after the death of Manochahal.
  - Listed in 1995 as one of the 4 "major militant groups" in the Khalistan movement.
- Khalistan Commando Force (KCF)
  - Formed by the Sarbat Khalsa in 1986. It does not figure in the list of terrorist organisations declared by the US Department of State (DOS).
  - According to the DOS and the Assistant Inspector General of the Punjab Police Intelligence Division, the KCF was responsible for the deaths of thousands in India, including the 1995 assassination of Chief Minister Beant Singh.
- Khalistan Liberation Army (KLA)
  - Reputed to have been a wing of, associated with, or a breakaway group of the Khalistan Liberation Force.
- Khalistan Liberation Force
  - Formed in 1986
  - Believed to be responsible for several bombings of civilian targets in India during the 1980s and 1990s, sometimes in conjunction with Islamist Kashmir separatists.
- Khalistan Zindabad Force (KZF)
  - Listed as a terrorist organisation by the EU.
  - Last major suspected activity was a bomb blast in 2006 at the Inter-State Bus Terminus in Jalandhar.
- International Sikh Youth Federation (ISYF), based in the United Kingdom.
- All India Sikh Students Federation (AISSF)
- Dashmesh Regiment
- Shaheed Khalsa Force

=== Abatement ===
The US Department of State found that Sikh extremism had decreased significantly from 1992 to 1997, although a 1997 report noted that "Sikh militant cells are active internationally and extremists gather funds from overseas Sikh communities."

In 1999, Kuldip Nayar, writing for Rediff.com, stated in an article, titled "It is fundamentalism again", that the Sikh "masses" had rejected terrorists. By 2001, Sikh extremism and the demand for Khalistan had all but abated.

Reported in his paper, titled "From Bhindranwale to Bin Laden: Understanding Religious Violence", Director Mark Juergensmeyer of the Orfalea Centre for Global & International Studies, UCSB, interviewed a militant who said that "the movement is over," as many of his colleagues had been killed, imprisoned, or driven into hiding, and because public support was gone.

== Outside of India ==
Operation Blue Star and its violent aftermaths popularised the demand for Khalistan among many Sikhs dispersed globally. Involvement of sections of Sikh diaspora turned out to be important for the movement as it provided the diplomatic and financial support. It also enabled Pakistan to become involved in the fuelling of the movement. Sikhs in UK, Canada and USA arranged for cadres to travel to Pakistan for military and financial assistance. Some Sikh groups abroad even declared themselves as the Khalistani government in exile.

Sikh places of worship, gurdwaras, provided the geographic and institutional coordination for the Sikh community. Sikh political factions have used the gurdwaras as a forum for political organisation. The gurdwaras sometimes served as the site for mobilisation of diaspora for Khalistan movement directly by raising funds. Indirect mobilisation was sometimes provided by promoting a stylised version of conflict and Sikh history. The rooms in some gurdwara exhibit pictures of Khalistani leaders along with paintings of martyrs from Sikh history.

Gurdwaras also host speakers and musical groups that promote and encourage the movement. Among the diasporas, Khalistan issue has been a divisive issue within gurdwaras. These factions have fought over the control of gurdwaras and their political and financial resources. The fights between pro and anti-Khalistan factions over gurdwaras often included violent acts and bloodshed as reported from UK and North America. The gurdwaras with Khalistani leadership allegedly funnel the collected funds into activities supporting the movement.

Different groups of Sikhs in the diaspora organise the convention of international meetings to facilitate communication and establish organisational order. In April 1981 the first "International Convention of Sikhs," was held in New York and was attended by some 200 delegates. In April 1987 the third convention was held in Slough, Berkshire where the Khalistan issue was addressed. This meeting's objective was to "build unity in the Khalistan movement."

All these factors further strengthened the emerging nationalism among Sikhs. Sikh organisations launched many fund-raising efforts that were used for several purposes. After 1984 one of the objectives was the promotion of the Sikh version of "ethnonational history" and the relationship with the Indian state. The Sikh diaspora also increased their efforts to build institutions to maintain and propagate their ethnonational heritage. A major objective of these educational efforts was to publicise a different face to the non-Sikh international community who regarded the Sikhs as "terrorists".

In 1993, Khalistan was briefly admitted in the Unrepresented Nations and Peoples Organization, but was suspended in a few months. The membership suspension was made permanent on 22 January 1995.

Edward T.G. Anderson, an associate professor in history, describes the Khalistan movement outside India as follows:

One example is the Khalistan movement, a separatist struggle for Sikh self-determination in Punjab, which in the diaspora has manifested in highly conspicuous and provocative protests, pugnacious rhetoric, violent tensions between different South Asian communities, and 'long-distance' support for militant secessionists.

— Edward T.G. Anderson, Hindu Nationalism in the Indian Diaspora, Oxford University Press (2024)

=== Pakistan ===
Pakistan has long aspired to dismember India through its Bleed India strategy. Even before the Indo-Pakistani War of 1971, Zulfikar Ali Bhutto, then a member of the military regime of General Yahya Khan, stated, "Once the back of Indian forces is broken in the east, Pakistan should occupy the whole of Eastern India and make it a permanent part of East Pakistan.... Kashmir should be taken at any price, even the Sikh Punjab and turned into Khalistan."

The Sikh separatist leader Jagjit Singh Chohan said that during his talks with Pakistani prime minister that Zulfikar Ali Bhutto affirmed "we'll help you and make it the capital of Khalistan"; Bhutto wanted revenge over Bangladesh.

General Zia-ul Haq, who succeeded Bhutto as the Head of State, attempted to reverse the traditional antipathy between Sikhs and Muslims arising from the partition violence by restoring Sikh shrines in Pakistan and opening them for Sikh pilgrimage. The expatriate Sikhs from England and North America that visited these shrines were at the forefront of the calls for Khalistan. During the pilgrims' stay in Pakistan, the Sikhs were exposed to Khalistani propaganda, which would not be openly possible in India.

The ISI chief, General Abdul Rahman, opened a cell within ISI with the objective of supporting the "[Sikhs']...freedom struggle against India". Rahman's colleagues in ISI took pride in the fact that "the Sikhs were able to set the whole province on fire. They knew who to kill, where to plant a bomb and which office to target." General Hamid Gul argued that keeping Punjab destabilised was equivalent to the Pakistan Army having an extra division at no cost. Zia-ul Haq, on the other hand, consistently practised the art of plausible denial. The Khalistan movement was brought to a decline only after India fenced off a part of the Punjab border with Pakistan and the Benazir Bhutto government agreed to joint patrols of the border by Indian and Pakistani troops.

In 2006, an American court convicted Khalid Awan, a Muslim and Canadian of Pakistani descent, of "supporting terrorism" by providing money and financial services to the Khalistan Commando Force chief Paramjit Singh Panjwar in Pakistan. KCF members had carried out deadly attacks against Indian civilians causing thousands of deaths. Awan frequently travelled to Pakistan and was alleged by the US officials to have links to Sikh and Muslim extremists, as well as Pakistani intelligence.

In 2008, India's Intelligence Bureau indicated that Pakistan's Inter-Services Intelligence organisation was trying to revive Sikh militancy.

=== United States ===
The New York Times reported in June 1984 that Indian Prime Minister Indira Gandhi conveyed to Helmut Schmidt and Willy Brandt, both of them being former Chancellors of West Germany, that United States' Central Intelligence Agency (CIA) was involved in causing unrest in Punjab. It also reported that The Indian Express quoted anonymous officials from India's intelligence establishment as saying that the CIA "masterminded" a plan to support the acolytes of Jarnail Singh Bhindranwale, who died during Operation Blue Star, by smuggling weapons for them through Pakistan. The United States embassy denied this report's findings.

According to B. Raman, former Additional Secretary in the Cabinet Secretariat of India and a senior official of the Research and Analysis Wing, the United States initiated a plan in complicity with Pakistan's General Yahya Khan in 1971 to support an insurgency for Khalistan in Punjab.

In 2023, the United States alleged a plot by the Indian government to assassinate the New York–based Sikh separatist Gurpatwant Singh Pannun, a spokesperson for the pro-Khalistan group Sikhs for Justice. On 29 November 2023, an Indian government employee was the target of an indictment in New York for their alleged role in the assassination plot.

=== Canada ===
Video of a Khalistan flag at Gurdwara Sri Guru Nanak Sikh Centre Brampton in Brampton, Ontario, Canada, 23 February 2026

Immediately after Operation Blue Star, authorities were unprepared for how quickly extremism spread and gained support in Canada, with extremists "...threatening to kill thousands of Hindus by a number of means, including blowing up Air India flights." Canadian Member of Parliament Ujjal Dosanjh, a moderate Sikh, stated that he and others who spoke out against Sikh extremism in the 1980s faced a "reign of terror".

On 18 November 1998, the Canada-based Sikh journalist Tara Singh Hayer was gunned down by suspected Khalistani militants. The publisher of the Indo-Canadian Times, a Canadian Sikh and once-vocal advocate of the armed struggle for Khalistan, he had criticised the bombing of Air India Flight 182, and was to testify about a conversation he overheard concerning the bombing. On 24 January 1995, Tarsem Singh Purewal, editor of Britain's Punjabi-language weekly Des Pardes, was killed as he was closing his office in Southall. There is speculation that the murder was related to Sikh extremism, which Purewal may have been investigating. Another theory is that he was killed in retaliation for revealing the identity of a young rape victim.

Terry Milewski reported in a 2007 documentary for the CBC that a minority within Canada's Sikh community was gaining political influence even while publicly supporting terrorist acts in the struggle for an independent Sikh state. In response, the World Sikh Organization of Canada (WSO), a Canadian Sikh human rights group that opposes violence and extremism, sued the CBC for "defamation, slander, and libel", alleging that Milewski linked it to terrorism and damaged the reputation of the WSO within the Sikh community. In 2015, however, the WSO unconditionally abandoned "any and all claims" made in its lawsuit.

Canadian journalist Kim Bolan has written extensively on Sikh extremism. Speaking at the Fraser Institute in 2007, she reported that she still received death threats over her coverage of the 1985 Air India bombing.

In 2008, a CBC report stated that "a disturbing brand of extremist politics has surfaced" at some of the Sikh Vaisakhi parades in Canada, and The Trumpet agreed that "Sikh terrorism" has entered in Canadian politics. Two leading Canadian Sikh politicians refused to attend the parade in Surrey, saying it was a glorification of terrorism. In 2008, Dr. Manmohan Singh, Prime Minister of India, expressed his concern that there might be a resurgence of Sikh extremism.

There has been some controversy over Canada's response to the Khalistan movement. After Amarinder Singh's refusal to meet Canadian Prime Minister Justin Trudeau in 2017, calling him a "Khalistani sympathiser", Singh ultimately met with Trudeau on 22 February 2018 over the issue. Trudeau assured Singh that his country would not support the revival of the separatist movement. Shiromani Akali Dal President Sukhbir Badal was quoted saying Khalistan is "no issue, either in Canada or in Punjab".

A 2020 report by Canadian ex-journalist Terry Milewski criticised the Khalistan movement as driven by the Pakistani government, and as a threat to Canadian interests.

In September 2023, while speaking to the Canadian parliament, Justin Trudeau accused India of being involved in the slaying of Hardeep Singh Nijjar, a prominent advocate of the Khalistan separatist movement who had been killed by masked gunmen in Surrey, British Columbia. Although Nijjar had been accused by India of having links to terrorism, India denied any involvement in his death. A subsequent diplomatic row followed, with both countries expelling multiple diplomatic staff in 2023 and 2024. Canada has not shared evidence of Indian involvement in the killing of Nijar, citing the need to protect sensitive intelligence sources and methods.

In March 2026, Nancy Grewal, a Canadian Sikh social media influencer who was a critic of Khalistan extremism, was fatally stabbed in LaSalle, Ontario. A week before her murder, Nancy had spoken to CBC, telling them that she was receiving death threats for speaking out against the Khalistan movement. A social media account promoting Khalistani extremism claimed responsibility for her stabbing.

Canadian Security Intelligence Service (CSIS) 2025 report has officially identified Canada-based Khalistani extremists as a national security threat. This is shift from the previous stance of Canada on the issue. The report states that a small group of Khalistani extremists fund and promote violence primarily in India. The report also explicitly states that some Canada-based Khalistani Extremists (CBKEs) well connected to Canadian citizens leverage Canadian institutions to promote violence and collect funds from unsuspecting community members that are then diverted towards extremist activities.

=== United Kingdom ===
In February 2008, BBC Radio 4 reported that the Chief of the Punjab Police, NPS Aulakh, alleged that militant groups were receiving money from the British Sikh community. The same report included statements that although the Sikh militant groups were poorly equipped and staffed, intelligence reports and interrogations indicated that Babbar Khalsa was sending its recruits to the same terrorist training camps in Pakistan used by Al Qaeda.

Lord Bassam of Brighton, then Home Office minister, stated that International Sikh Youth Federation (ISYF) members working from the UK had committed "assassinations, bombings, and kidnappings" and were a "threat to national security." The group's past attacks included assassinations, bombings, and kidnappings, mainly directed against Indian officials and interests. The ISYF was proscribed by the UK on 29 March 2001 under the Terrorism Act 2000, along with 20 other organisations. Though not included in the list of terrorist organisations by the United States Department of State, it was added to the US Treasury Department terrorism list on 27 June 2002.

Andrew Gilligan, reporting for the London Evening Standard, stated that the Sikh Federation (UK) is the "successor" of the ISYF, and that its executive committee, objectives, and senior members are largely the same. The Vancouver Sun reported in February 2008 that Dabinderjit Singh was campaigning to have both the Babbar Khalsa and International Sikh Youth Federation de-listed as terrorist organisations. It also stated of Public Safety Minister Stockwell Day that "he has not been approached by anyone lobbying to delist the banned groups". Day is also quoted as saying "The decision to list organisations such as Babbar Khalsa, Babbar Khalsa International, and the International Sikh Youth Federation as terrorist entities under the Criminal Code is intended to protect Canada and Canadians from terrorism." In the UK, however, the ISYF was removed from the list of proscribed organisations in March 2016, after the Home Secretary concluded there was insufficient evidence to show the group remained concerned in terrorism. There are claims of funding from Sikhs outside India to attract young people into these pro-Khalistan militant groups.

== See also ==
- Khalsa
- Kharku
- Sikhism in India
- Sikhs for Justice
