= Khalistan Referendum =

Referendum on creation of a Sikh state in India

- Part of the Khalistan movement
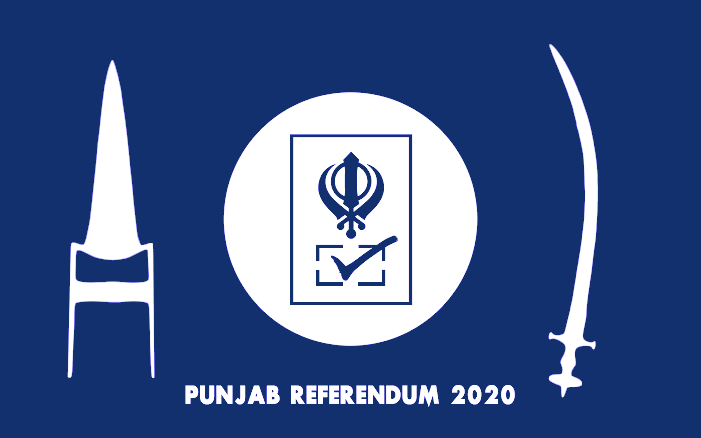
- Banner of the Khalistan Referendum
- Date: 31 October 2021 – present
- Venue: Australia; Canada; Italy; New Zealand; Switzerland; United Kingdom; United States
- Type: Referendum
- Theme: Potential creation of an independent Sikh state
- Website: Referendum2020.org

The Khalistan Referendum is an unofficial, non-binding referendum organized by the Sikhs for Justice across multiple countries regarding the potential creation of a separate Sikh state from within the territory of India. SFJ's proposed map of Khalistan includes Indian Punjab, as well as Chandigarh, Himachal Pradesh, Haryana and several districts of Uttarakhand, Uttar Pradesh and Rajasthan. Its goal is to seek a consensus among diasporic Sikhs for the creation of a nation-state to be called Khalistan.

== Background ==
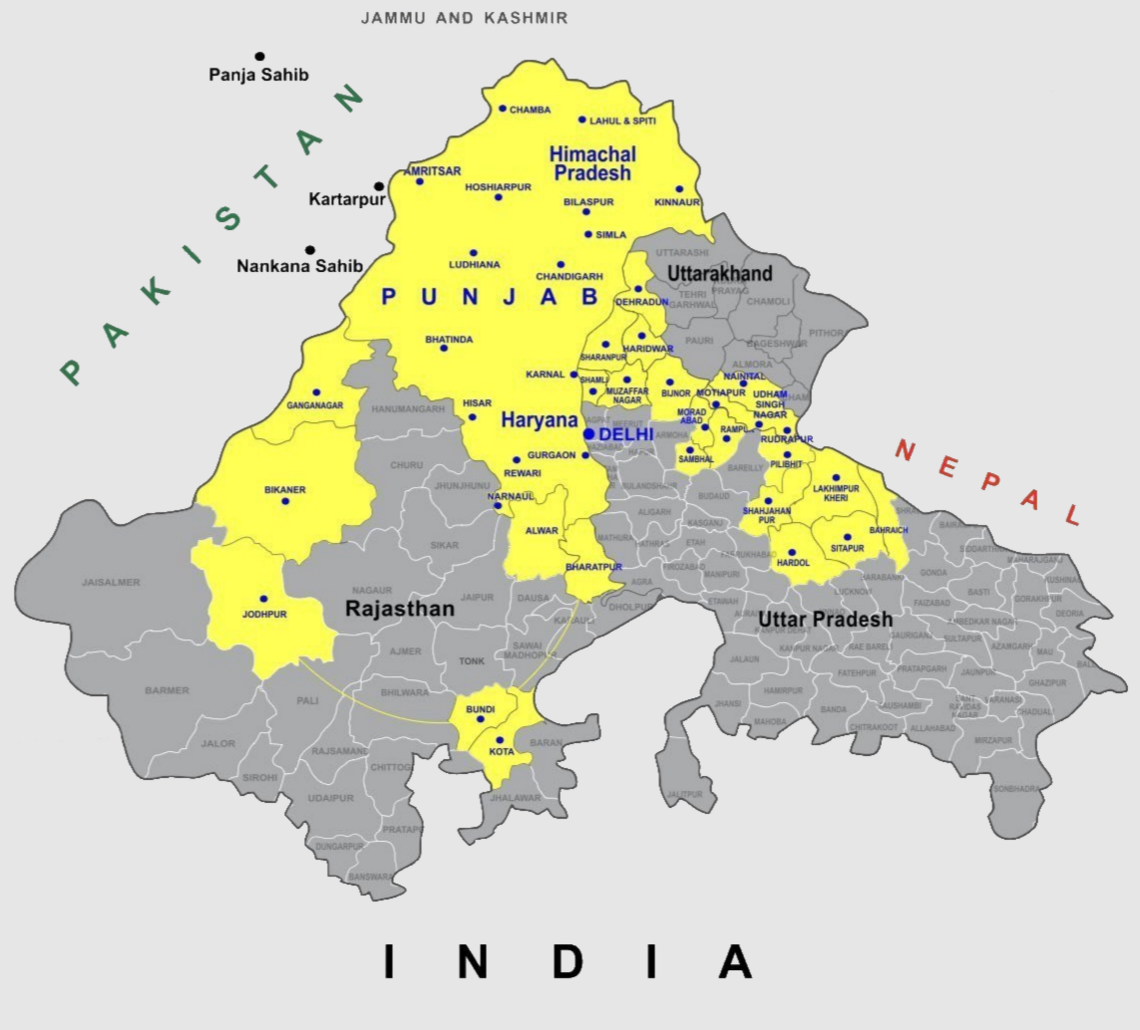
Map of Khalistan proposed by the Sikhs for Justice

Sikhs for Justice (SFJ), which was banned in India in 2019, intends to conduct the referendum in Punjab and major cities worldwide. The Indian government has accused Canada of permitting extremists to carry out activities that are "deeply objectionable" and "politically motivated," which pose a threat to India's integrity. Canadian authorities have defended the exercise as an exercise of freedom of speech. The Khalistani campaign has become a contentious issue in the relationship between New Delhi and Ottawa. There are numerous cases registered in India against the SFJ and its founder, Gurpatwant Singh Pannun. In India, politicians in Punjab say the Khalistan movement there has been practically nonexistent for decades.

== Referendum by country ==
=== United Kingdom ===
On 31 October 2021, about 30,000 Sikhs took part in the first phase of the Khalistan referendum in London. A similar referendum was held in London in November 2021 with campaigners claiming that some 10,000 people participated. On 9 January 2022, the cities of Leeds and Luton hosted the eighth round of the Khalistan Referendum.

=== Switzerland ===
On 10 December 2021, over 6,000 Sikhs from Switzerland and neighboring France, Italy, and Germany converged in Geneva to vote in the non-binding Khalistan referendum despite a heavy snow and rain storm.

=== Italy ===
On 4 July 2022, Sikhs For Justice, a U.S based separatist group banned in India, held a round Khalistan referendum in Rome. The organisers reported that about 62,000 Sikhs participated.

=== Canada ===
On 19 September 2022, according to reports, 110,000 people participated in the Khalistan referendum in Brampton. The referendum results were not disclosed by SFJ. A second referendum was held on 10 September 2023 at the Guru Nanak Sikh Gurdwara in Surrey, British Columbia. On 29 October 2023, a third referendum round was held, again in Surrey. The group Sikhs For Justice (SFJ) claimed that combined voter count crossed 200,000 (2 lakh). On 28 July 2024, a fourth round of referendum was held in Calgary, according to media reports 55,000 people participated in referendum. The referendum took place in Ottawa on November 23, 2025, where over 53,000 people voted as per some reports.

=== Australia ===
On 29 January 2023, the Australian chapter's referendum for Khalistan's independence was held in Federation Square in Melbourne. The referendum results were not disclosed by SFJ. Some sources cited that over 31,000 people participated in referendum. The referendum became violent, with two Sikh activists being detained after two people were injured in a brawl at a polling station.

=== United States ===
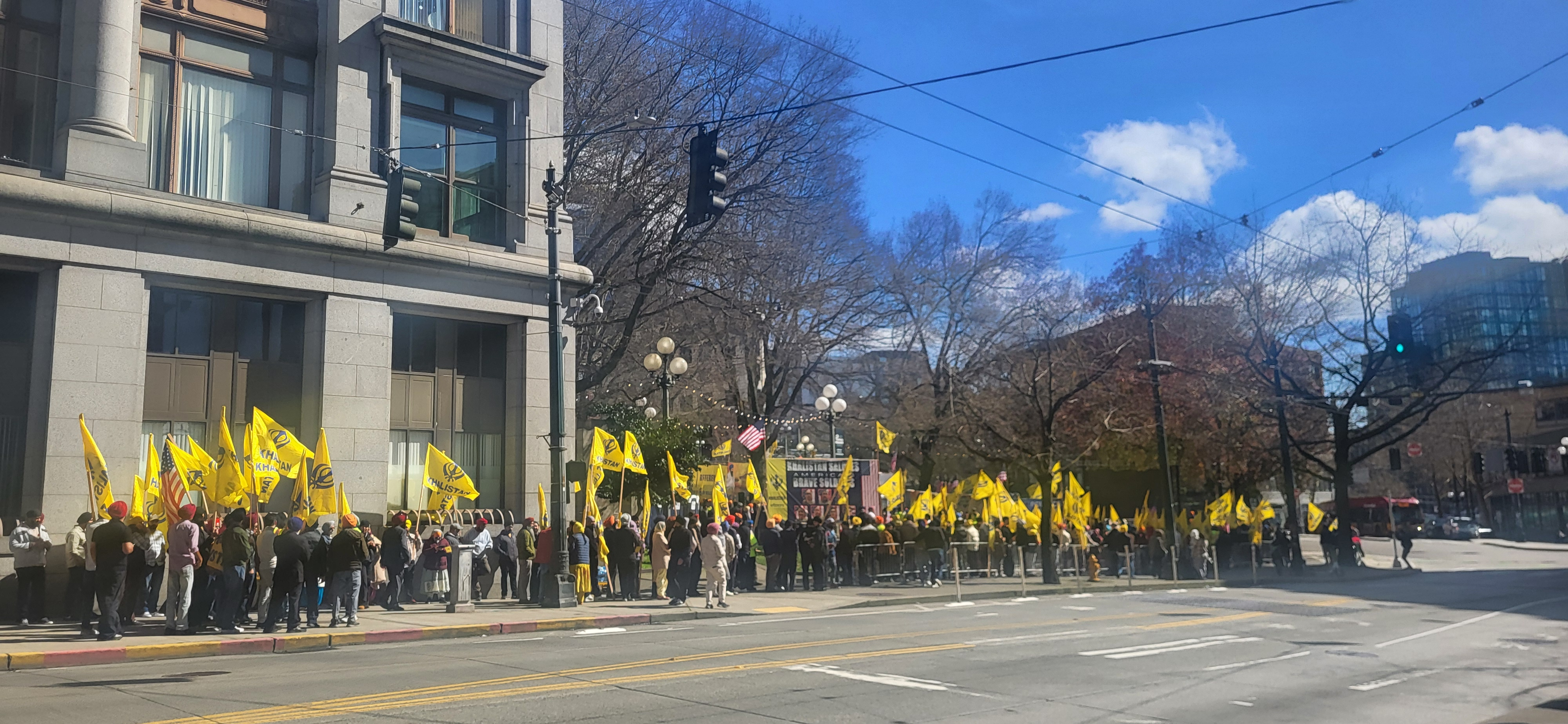
A line of Seattle referendum voters.

On 28 January 2024, about 127,000 people cast their ballots at Civic Center Plaza in San Francisco, California. On 31 March 2024, a referendum was held in Sacramento, California. where around 61,000 people participated. On 23 March 2025, a referendum was held in Los Angeles with over 35,000 Sikhs participating. On 17 August 2025, another referendum took place at the National Mall in Washington DC, where around 16,500 people cast their ballots according to some media sources. The next referendum to be held in the United States happened in Seattle on 22 March, 2026. After that, another referendum was held in Indianapolis on 16 August, 2026.

=== New Zealand ===
On 17 November 2024, thousands attended a referendum in Auckland's Aotea Square and the total votes cast were over 37,000. In early November 2024, Indian Minister of External Affairs S. Jaishankar had raised concerns with New Zealand Foreign Minister Winston Peters about the planned Auckland referendum.
