= Shaheed Khalsa Force =

Sikh separatist group

The Shaheed Khalsa Force (or Saheed Khalsa Force; abbr. SKF) was a Khalistani group which claimed credit for marketplace bombings in New Delhi in 1997. The group was previously unknown.

== Bomb blasts ==
Shaheed Khalsa Force had asserted that it set off three blasts in a Delhi district on 2 October 1997, wounding 27 people during a Hindu religious procession.

The same day, three bombs put in a train near Delhi killed 2 people and wounded 38, including 2 Japanese visitors and 5 Australians.

Shaheed Khalsa Force also asserted responsibility for three explosions in Delhi on 10 October 1997 that killed a child and wounded 16.

== Evidence about the group ==
All bombings for which Shaheed Khalsa Force claimed responsibility were in the Indian capital, Delhi. After 4-5 bomb-blasts in Delhi in 1997, the group was not reported again. Delhi police never arrested any member of SKF nor identified any of its leaders, so it remains unclear if the group was real or just a hoax.

== See also ==
- Kharku
