= Sikh diaspora =

Sikh migration from historical homeland

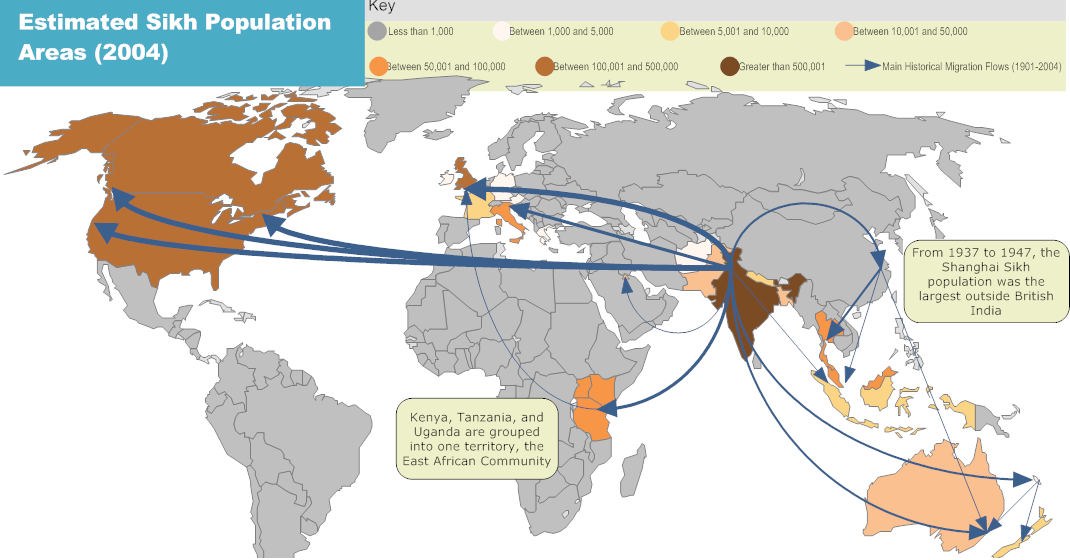
Map showing world Sikh population areas and historical migration patterns (est. 2004).

The Sikh diaspora is the modern Sikh migration from the traditional area of the Punjab region of South Asia. Sikhism is a religion native to this region. The Sikh diaspora is largely a subset of the Punjabi diaspora. Due to ongoing Sikh migrations from the Punjabi homeland, the religion is widespread across the globe, with diasporic communities having been established and growing in Asia, East Africa, Europe, and North America.

The diaspora is commonly accepted to have begun after the fall of the Sikh Empire in 1849 and the empire's subsequent annexation into British India. The onset of the Sikh diaspora is represented by Duleep Singh, the last emperor of the Sikhs, who was forced into exile by the British. Starting with this event, the rate of Sikh migration from Punjab has remained high and included a number of international destinations.

Emigration out of Punjab abroad was historically mostly confined to the Doaba region and parts of Ludhiana and Moga districts of the Malwa region but has since become a pan-Punjabi phenomenon.

== Religion ==
With more than 25 million worldwide, Sikhs are adherents of the fifth-largest religion in the world. The 2011 Indian census reported approximately 20 million Sikhs living in India. Of these, 16 million, or 76% of all Indian Sikhs, live in the northern state of Punjab, where they form 58% of the population. Substantial communities of Sikhs also live in the Indian states and union territories of Haryana, Rajasthan, Uttar Pradesh, Delhi, Himachal Pradesh, Maharashtra, Bihar, Uttarakhand, and Jammu and Kashmir. The states of Maharastra and Bihar are home to the two important Sikh Takht of Hazur Sahib and Patna Sahib, respectively. The Canadian province of British Columbia was home to close to 300,000 Sikhs as of 2011.

== Historical migration patterns ==
The Sikhs as a political entity, distinct from other Indian traditions, can be said to have begun with the martyrdom of the fifth Sikh Guru, Arjan Dev, in 1606. Sikh distinction was further enhanced by the 1699 establishment of the Sikh brotherhood, or Khalsa (ਖ਼ਾਲਸਾ), by Gobind Singh. This gives the Sikhs, as an organized political grouping, a relatively recent history of around 400 years. Migrations during the era of the gurus were limited to the boundaries of modern-day India and Pakistan, and in particular, restricted to the Sikh tribal heartland of the Punjab region. The development of the Sikh Confederacy and the rise of the Sikh Empire (1716–1849) led to Sikhs migrating to conquered parts of their empire, such as Ladakh and Peshawar. However, these migrations were limited, transitory, and unsustained, depending on the empire's fluctuating boundaries. During the reign of the Sikh Empire, there was a net cultural immigration, with Napoleonic and British influences vying for the 'ear' of the then-Sikh maharajah Ranjit Singh.

== Annexation of the Punjab ==
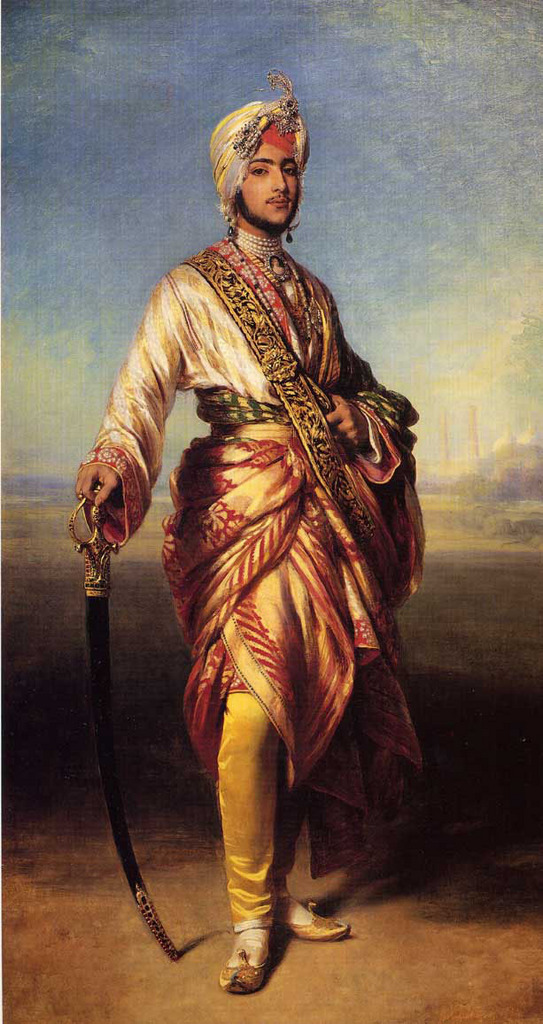
Maharajah Duleep Singh, the first and most famous member of the Sikh diaspora

Sikh migration from Punjab began in earnest in the second half of the 19th century, when the British Raj had successfully completed its annexation of the region. The pivotal action in the British annexation was the lifetime exile of the then-eleven-year-old maharaja, Duleep Singh, making him the first (albeit unwilling) member of the Sikh diaspora.

Although a largely secular figure who did little for the Sikh body politic, Axel (2001) argues that Singh's exile has had a major impact on the Sikh diaspora psyche. Axel says that Singh is the archetypal "tragic hero" figure in Sikh culture, "a King without a Kingdom, a Sikh separated from his people".

Having annexed the Sikh Empire, the British preferentially recruited Sikhs in the Indian Civil Service and, in particular, the British Indian Army, which led to the migration of Sikhs to different parts of British India and the British Empire. Semiskilled artisans were transported from the Punjab to British East Africa to help in the building of railways, while many Sikhs found themselves in Australia, working as ghans, or cameleers, and as labourers on cane plantations.

== 20th century ==
Sikhs made tremendous contributions to Punjab from 1857 to 1947, including founding the city of Rawalpindi. Sikh agricultural and entrepreneurial skills brought prosperity to Sheikhupura, Sialkot, Jhelum, Multan, Sargodha, Gujrat, Ludhiana, Amritsar, and Jullundar. Lahore, the capital of undivided Punjab, had thriving Sikh neighborhoods.

The era of peace and prosperity ended in 1947, with the partition of Punjab between India and Pakistan. Sikh communities were practically wiped out from Lahore, Rawalpindi, Multan, Sialkot, Lyallpur, Jhelum, Gujrat, Sargodha, Sheikhupura, and other districts of West Punjab. The birthplace of Sikhism, Nankana Sahib, was split away in West Punjab. Millions of Sikhs fled to freedom and safety in East Punjab; smaller numbers also fled to Afghanistan.

In the 1960s and beyond, many Sikhs migrated to the UK and North America in search of economic opportunities. Some of the Sikhs who had settled in eastern Africa were expelled by Ugandan leader Idi Amin in 1972. Sikhs are traditionally an agrarian community, and with the pressures of having only a limited amount of land, high birth rates, and the desire to make a better living, male offspring of Sikh farmers were encouraged to migrate to foreign countries, with significant Sikh communities becoming established in the Philippines, Canada, the UK, US, Malaysia, East Africa, Australia, and Thailand.

== Khalistan movement ==
Sikh Flag—The Nishan Sahib

Axel (2001) argues that the Sikh diaspora community, having established themselves in foreign countries, began to fetishize the past and nurture idealized designs for their 'lost and imaginary' Sikh empire. This came to fruition to a certain degree with the establishment of Indian Punjab in 1966 as a Sikh-majority state. However, Tatla (1998) argues that the marginalization and sense of grievance that Indian Sikhs were facing due to Indira Gandhi's heavy-handed tactics were amplified in the Sikh diaspora. Subsequently, the Sikh diaspora, especially in south Vancouver, Canada, and the UK, became willing suppliers of logistical and financial support when the organic agitation for a separate Sikh nation, Khalistan, began in the late 1970s. The actions taken by the Indian government to counter the Sikh separatist movement, via 1984's Operation Blue Star, had a seismic effect on the Sikh diaspora. Axel (2001) argues that the desecration of the Sikhs' holiest shrine, Harimandir Sahib, and the following Sikh pogrom in which thousands of Sikhs were massacred, led to a resurgence in Sikh religiosity and a strengthening of ties with their Sikh brethren in Punjab. Diaspora Sikhs felt betrayed by India, and the events of 1984 defined their Sikhism and underlined a distinct commonality shared with other diaspora Sikhs. Mark Tully describes Operation Blue Star as the Sikhs' 9/11. This was certainly the case for diaspora Sikhs, who in the main could only watch on in horror as the events of 1984 played out on TV.

In 1971, Jagit Singh Chohan, an ex-minister in a short-lived government of Akali dissidents, saw an alignment of like-minded Sikhs. Chohan placed a half-page advertisement in The New York Times on 12 October 1971, making several claims about Punjab as a Sikh homeland. However, Chohan won little sympathy from ordinary Sikhs.

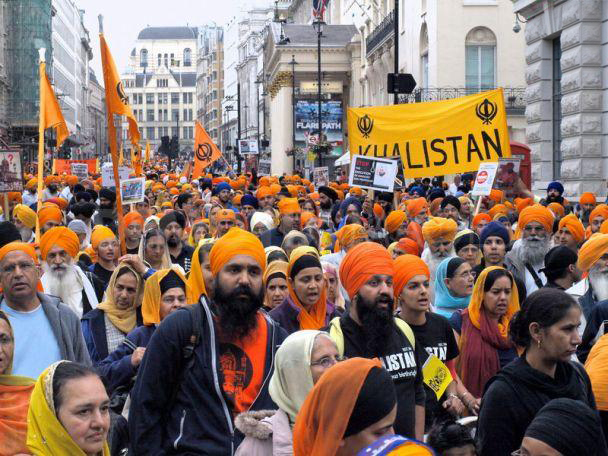
Sikhs in London protest against Indian government actions

Tatla summarises the change in Sikh diaspora community leaders post-1984 a being a "painful transition from a self-confident community with haughty discourse, to the self-defensive strategies of a vulnerable minority". Organisations such as the International Sikh Youth Federation, the Babbar Khalsa, and the Council of Khalistan emerged within the diaspora, and these agencies rallied against "Hindu imperialism" or "Indian nationalism" and lobbied to join the Unrepresented Nations and Peoples Organization, aligning the Sikh cause with other ethnic groups seeking freedom, citing cases of Jews, Palestinians, Kurds, Balochis, Kashmiris, and Sri Lankan Tamils. Another organization, by the name of Sikhs for Justice, headquartered in New York, which surfaced roughly in 2014, has campaigned for the cause using activities like #BurnTheTricolour.

Axel (2001) argues that the history of the Sikh diaspora, its psyche of grievance, and the violence inflicted on it, means that the notion of the Sikh diaspora as a community today inevitably converges on the notion of Khalistan. In addition to this, Axel points out the "nightmare" scenario facing the Sikh diaspora: the Indian state "demands" the "Unity-in-Diversity" model of rashtriya ekta (national integration), which Axel contends is signified by "the denial of difference through surrender, assimilation and integration".

== Sikh identity today ==
Whilst the rate of Sikh migration from Indian Punjab has remained high, traditional patterns of Sikh migration that favored English-speaking countries, particularly the United Kingdom, have changed in the past decade due to factors such as stricter immigration procedures. Moliner (2006) states that as a consequence of the "fact" that Sikh migration to the UK had "become virtually impossible since the late 1970s", Sikh migration patterns altered to continental Europe. Italy has now emerged as a fast-growing area for Sikh migration, with Reggio Emilia and the province of Vicenza being areas of significant Sikh population clusters. Italian Sikhs are generally involved in the areas of agriculture, agro-processing, machine tools, and horticulture. Canada has maintained a liberal immigration policy, and the Sikh community there is the largest in proportion to the country's population, even above India (2.1% of Canada's population versus 1.7% of India's). The largest North American Sikh community is thought to be located in south Vancouver, British Columbia, and nearby Surrey.

In the post-9/11 era, the Sikh diaspora in Europe and North America stood out as a visible minority often confused with radical Islamic groups because of their turbans. This has included numerous hate crimes targeting Sikhs. France banned turban-wearing Sikh students from publicly funded schools as part of a broader policy originally intended to restrict Muslim headscarves. Western security think tanks have quoted the Air India bombing to justify profiling of Sikh travellers at airports. Countering this train of thought, on 1 October 2017, Canadian politician Jagmeet Singh, a Sikh, was elected leader of the federal New Democratic Party, and on 16 January 2018, Gurbir Grewal became attorney general of New Jersey—the first practicing Sikh in the US to become a state attorney general.

== See also ==
- Sikhism by country
