= Timeline of the insurgency in Punjab, India =

The following timeline documents the insurgency in Punjab, India:

Punjab insurgency chronology outline
Date	Event	Source
March 1972	Akali Dal loses the 1972 Punjab elections to the Indian National Congress.	
16–17 October 1973	Akalis demand Sikh rights in the Anandpur Sahib Resolution.	
13 April 1978	The 1978 Sikh–Nirankari clash was a violent confrontation in Amritsar where traditional Sikhs protested against a Sant Nirankari convention, resulting in 16 deaths and escalating tensions that contributed to unrest.	
25 April 1980	Gurbachan Singh of Sant Nirankari sect shot dead.	
2 June 1980	Akalis lose the 1980 Punjab elections.	
16 Aug 1981	Sikhs in Golden Temple meet foreign correspondents	
9 Sep 1981	Lala Jagat Narain, Editor of Hind Samachar is murdered.	
29 Sep 1981	Dal Khalsa militants hijack Indian Airlines Flight 423 flying from Delhi-Palam Airport to Amritsar-Raja Sansi Airport and divert it to Lahore Airport in Pakistan. They demand the release of separatist leader Jarnail Singh Bhindranwale and a sum of $500,000 in cash. The hijacking ends with Pakistani SSG forces rescuing all the passengers.	
19 November 1981	Police Inspector Pritam Singh Bajwa and Constable Surat Singh of Jalandhar were gunned down in Daheru village in Ludhiana district. The terrorists, who were hiding in the house of Amarjit Singh Nihang, all managed to escape. This act gained Babbar Khalsa and its chief Talwinder Singh Parmar notoriety. Named in the first information report were Wadhawa Singh (current Babbar Khalsa chief), Talwinder Singh Parmar, Amarjit Singh Nihang, Amarjit Singh (Head Constable), Sewa Singh (Head Constable) and Gurnam Singh (Head Constable).	
11 Feb 1982	Jagjit Singh Chauhan, founder of the Council of Khalistan, is granted entry in to the United States.	
11 Apr 1982	US based Sikh activist Ganga Singh Dhillon barred From India	
July 1982	Protesting Sikhs storm the Parliament in New Delhi due to inaction of authorities regarding the deaths of 34 Sikhs in police custody.	
4 Aug 1982	Akalis demand autonomy and additional regions for Punjab	
11 Oct 1982	Sikhs stage protests at the Indian Parliament, members of the Pro-Autonomy Faction, belonging to the Shiromani Akali Dal attack with swords the building, killing four people, five wounded, and at least 60 policemen were said to be injured. The attack is in response of the deaths of 34 Sikhs in police custody in Punjab last month.	
Nov 1982	Harchand Singh Longowal, President of the Akali Dal, threatens to disrupt the Asian Games	
27 Feb 1983	Sikhs permitted to carry daggers in domestic flights	
23 April 1983	Punjab Police Deputy Inspector General A. S. Atwal was shot dead as he left the Golden Temple compound by a lone unknown gunman||	
3 May 1983	Jarnail Singh Bhindranwale, talks of violence being perpetuated against Sikhs and for India to understand	
18 June 1983	A detective Inspector from Punjab police killed by Sikh militants	
14 July 1983	Four policemen killed by Sikh militants in physical confrontation	
21 September 1983	Senior superintendent of Police wounded and his guard killed by Sikh militants	
29 September 1983	5 Police constables killed by Sikh militants	
5 Oct 1983	6 Hindu passengers killed in 1983 Dhilwan bus massacre.	
6 Oct 1983	President's rule imposed in Punjab	
14 Oct 1983	2 people killed in a bombing at a Hindu festival in Chandigarh	
Oct 1983	Hindu pulled off a train and bus and killed	
mid-Oct 1983	Two people injured in a bomb blast on the outskirts of Chandigarh.; Two people were killed and more than 30 injured when grenades exploded in two theaters in Delhi.; 2 people were injured when a grenade went off in the New Delhi railway station.	
21 Oct 1983	A passenger train was derailed and 2 agricultural labourers travelling were killed by Sikh militants	
18 Nov 1983	A bus was hijacked and 4 passengers were killed by Sikh militants	
9 Feb 1984	A wedding procession bombed	
14 Feb 1984	Six policemen abducted from a post near Golden Temple and one of them killed.	
14 Feb 1984	More than 12 Sikhs killed in riots in Haryana	
19 Feb 1984	Sikh-Hindu clashes spread in North India	
23 Feb 1984	3 Hindus killed and 24 injured by Sikh militants	
25 Feb 1984	1 Hindu killed in by Sikh militants, total 69 Hindus slayed over last 11 days	
28 Feb 1984	President of Delhi Sikh Gurudwara Management Committee (DSGMC) H.S Manchada shot dead at ITO, Delhi	
29 Feb 1984	By this time, the Sikh political centre had become the centre of the 19-month-old uprising by the Sikhs	
3 April 1984	A prominent member of BJP, Harbans Lal Khanna, killed in Amritsar	
4 April 1984	Professor V. N. Tiwari, a Rajya Sabha MP and father of Congress leader Manish Tewari was shot dead in Chandigarh while on a morning walk	
9 April 1984	Bomb attack on Hindu temple in Bhatinda by Sikh Militant leaves 3 wounded	
14 April 1984	Surinder Singh Sodhi, follower of Bhindranwale, shot dead at a tea-stall outside the Golden Temple by a man and a woman	
15 April 1984	Jasjit Singh, owner of the tea stall is shot and killed by two assailants. Co-conspirators Bachan Singh and Malik Singh Bhatia are killed inside the temple	
16 April 1984	Discovery of the mutilated bodies of Surinder Singh Shinda alias Chhinda, and Baljit Kaur, the assassins of Surinder Singh Sodhi.	
12 May 1984	Romesh Chander, son of Lala Jagat Narain, former Editor, Hind Samachar group murdered.	
27 May 1984	Hindu politician killed in Firozpur	
1 June 1984	Army controls Punjab's security	
1 June 1984	Total media and the press black out in Punjab, the rail, road and air services in Punjab suspended. Foreigners' and NRIs' entry was also banned and water and electricity supply cut off.	
5 June 1984	Operation Blue Star to remove militants from Harmandir Sahib commences, Punjab shut-down from outside world.	
6 June 1984	Daylong battle in temple	
7 June 1984	Harmandir Sahib Overtaken by Indian Army	
7 June 1984	Jarnail Singh Bhindranwale was killed and golden temple was relieved by the Indian Army.	
8 June 1984	27 Sikhs killed in protests in Srinagar, Ludhiana, Amritsar after Government forces fired on protesters	
9 June 1984	Weapons seized, troops fired on	
10 June 1984	Reports of anti-Sikh riots and killings in Delhi	
11 June 1984	Negotiators close to a settlement on waters	
24 August 1984	7 Sikh terrorists abduct 100 passengers in the Indian Airlines Airbus A300 hijacking	
31 October 1984	Indira Gandhi assassinated	
1 November 1984	1984 anti-Sikh riots begin in Delhi	
3 November 1984	Anti Sikh Violence a total of 2,733 Sikhs were killed	
23 June 1985	Air India Flight 182 was bombed by Sikh terrorists killing 329 people (including 22 crew members); almost all of them Hindus	
20 August 1985	Harchand Singh Longowal assassinated	
29 September 1985	60% vote, Akali Dal won 73 of 115 seats, Barnala CM	
26 January 1986	Sikhs have a global meeting and the rebuilding of Akal Takht declared as well as the five member Panthic Committee selected and have draft of the Constitution of Khalistan written	
29 April 1986	Resolution of Khalistan passed by Sarbat Khalsa and Khalistan Commando Force also formed at Akal Takht with more than 80,000 Sikhs present.	
25 July 1986	14 Hindus and one Sikh passenger killed in the 1986 Muktsar Bus massacre by unidentified separatists	
30 November 1986	24 Hindu passengers killed in the 1986 Hoshiarpur Bus massacre by terrorists	
19 May 1987	Deepak Dhawan, a member of the Punjab State Committee of the Communist Party of India (Marxist), is murdered in the village of Sangha, Tarn Taran district	
14 June 1987	Unidentified militants kill 25 in two attacks	
7 July 1987	Unidentified terrorists attacked two buses, singled out and killed 70 Hindu bus passengers in the 1987 Haryana killings	
19 February 1988	In Gurdaspur, Hoshiarpur and Patiala, bombs were exploded in courts by Babbar Khalsa. 12 to 13 persons killed and nearly 50 injured.	
2 April 1988	Unidentified gunmen stormed into huts and houses across Punjab state and killed 37 people, Including seven children.	
12 May 1988	Operation Black Thunder II to remove militants from Harmandir Sahib	
20 May 1988	A series of bombs allegedly planted by extremists exploded in Himachal Pradesh state buses. At least 10 people were killed.	
10 January 1990	Senior Superintendent of Batala Police Gobind Ram killed in bomb blast in retaliation of police gang raping Sikh woman of Gora Choor village	
16 June 1991	80 people killed on two trains by extremists	
17 October 1991	1991 Rudrapur bombings	
25 February 1992	Congress sweeps 1992 Punjab elections	
3 August 1992	29 hindus, first kidnapped and then killed by unidentified extremists in Uttar Pradesh	
7 January 1993	11 separatists killed in the village of Chhichhrewal Tehsil, Batala	
1 March 1993	Gurbachan Singh Manochahal killed by the police.	
31 August 1995	Chief Minister Beant Singh killed in a bomb blast.	

== See also ==
- Kharku
- Human rights abuses in Punjab, India
- List of terrorist incidents in Punjab, India
