= List of bus killings during Punjab insurgency =

There were multiple incidents of killing of bus passengers during the Insurgency in Punjab, India, which was an armed campaign by the pro-Khalistan militants from the mid-1980s to the mid-1990s. Major incidents included the Lalru massacre of 38 Hindu bus passengers on 6 July 1987, by the Khalistan Commando Force militants near Lalru, Punjab, India.; and Fatehabad bus killings on 7 July 1987, in which 34 Hindus on two buses were killed.

This is a list of bus passenger killings during the Insurgency in Punjab, India in the 1980s and 1990s (also includes rail passenger killings).

== Incidents involving shootings by militants ==
Date	Place	Incident
September- 5 October 1983	Dhilwan, Kapurthala district	Six Hindu passengers were shot dead by two pro-Khalistan Sikh militants, who hijacked a bus going from Dhilwan to Jalandhar in Punjab, and opened fire on Hindu passengers. This bus massacre triggered the President's rule in Punjab as by this time, more than 175 people had been killed in militancy-related violence.
18 Nov 1983	Kapurthala district	Nine armed men killed four Hindu bus passengers in Kapurthala district, Punjab, which had earlier witnessed another bus massacre in October by Sikh militants, and in both cases, the hijacked bus was abandoned at Chitiwind village on the outskirts of Amritsar.
23 Feb 1984	Punjab, India	11 Hindus killed by Sikh militants, including incidents in trains and busses.
21 May 1984	Moga	4 Hindu travelers were killed, and 10 others were wounded near Moga, about 175 miles northwest of New Delhi after six Sikh gunmen hijacked a bus and fired at its Hindu occupants.
12 September 1984	Batala	8 bus passengers killed.
25 July 1986	Mukatsar	1986 Muktsar bus massacre: 15 bus Hindu passengers gunned down by suspected Sikh militants.
30 November 1986	Khudda	24 Hindu bus passengers gunned down.
6 July 1987	Near Lalru	Khalistan Commando Force militants hijacked a Haryana Roadways bus and killed 38 Hindu bus passengers.
7 July 1987	Near Fatehabad	Sikh militants kill 34 Hindu bus passengers from two Haryana Roadways buses near Fatehabad
27 December 1988,	Near Mand, Punjab	Sikh militants pulled 7 Hindu passengers off a bus and escorted the passengers into a jungle where they were shot. 5 were killed and 2 were left in critical condition.
15 June 1991	Ludhiana district	1991 Punjab killings; 110 passengers killed by Sikh militants.

== Incidents involving mobs ==
Date	Place	Incident
8 July 1987	Jagdarshi	A Hindu mob set fire to a bus with Sikhs in it killing 1 and injuring 6.

== Incidents involving bus bombings ==
Date	Place	Incident
10 and 11 May 1985	New Delhi	85 Hindus were killed by militants in bombings, including bombs in a train and 2 buses. 59 Hindus had died on the spot while the rest succumbed to injuries after being hospitalized. The terrorists used transistor bombs in a train and 2 buses.

== Incidents involving Punjab Police ==
Date	Place	Incident
11 September 1982	Tarn Taran	32 Sikh activists and two police guards were killed and 21 others injured when a speeding train slammed into a bus with the newly arrested Sikh political activists, who had courted arrest as part of Dharam Yudh Morcha. Multiple Sikh leaders accused this of being a deliberate incident by the police to kill Sikhs who courted arrest.
July 1992	Uttar Pradesh	10 Sikhs were pulled off of a bus by police and killed in fake encounters while heading to Gurdaspur from Hazur Sahib.

== See also ==
- Punjab insurgency
- 1987 Punjab killings
- 1991 Punjab killings
- List of terrorist incidents in Punjab, India
- Persecution of Hindus
