= Kanwar Pal Singh Gill =

Indian police officer

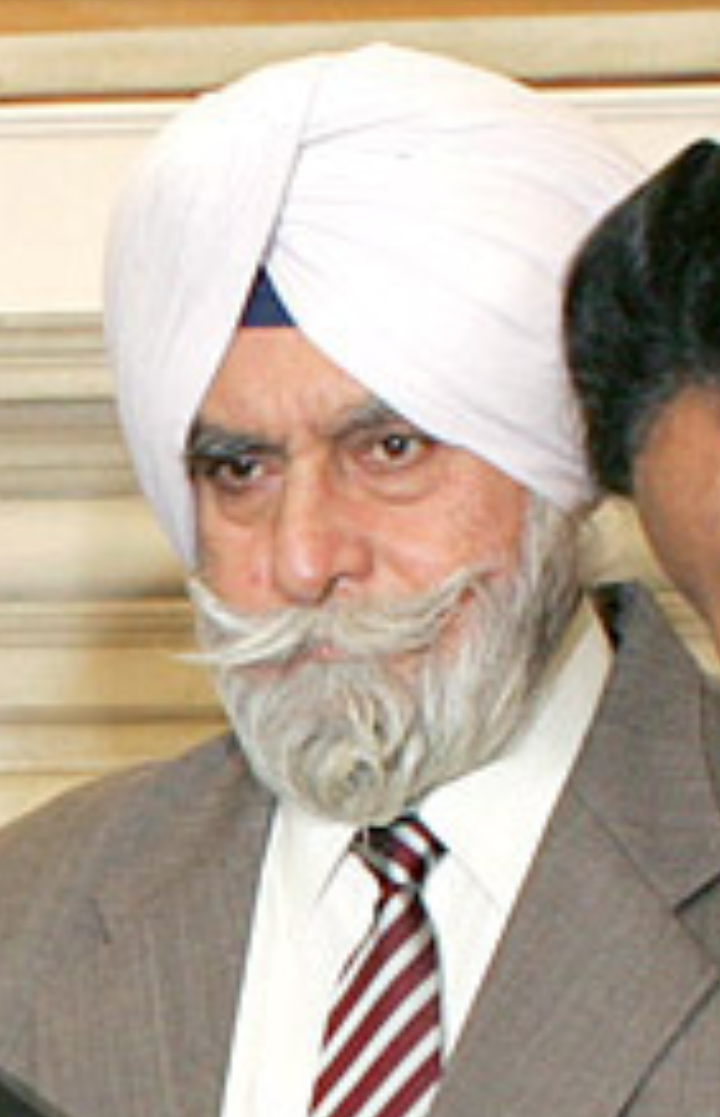
- Gill in 2005

Director General of Punjab Police
- In office 1988–1990
- In office 1991–1995

Director General of Central Reserve Police Force
- In office 19 December 1990 – 8 November 1991

Inspector General of Border Security Force in Jammu
- In office January 1984 – September 1984

Personal details
- Born: 29 December 1934 Ludhiana, Punjab, British India (present-day Punjab, India)
- Died: 26 May 2017 (aged 82) New Delhi, India
- Education: Panjab University
- Awards: Padma Shri
- Police career
- Department: Punjab Police; Assam Police; Central Reserve Police Force; Border Security Force
- Service years: 1958–1995
- Rank: Director General of Police in Punjab, Assam; Director General of Central Reserve Police Force; Inspector General of Border Security Force

Kanwar Pal Singh Gill (29 December 1934 – 26 May 2017) was an Indian Police Service (IPS) officer. For two terms he was director general of the Punjab police force, and was credited with having brought the Punjab insurgency under control. There are accusations that he and the forces under his command were responsible for "multiple cases of human rights violation", "in the name of" stamping out terrorism. He was also convicted in a sexual harassment case. Gill retired from the IPS in 1995.

Gill was also an author and editor, and was president of the Indian Hockey Federation for fifteen years, until he resigned following a corruption scandal.

== Early life ==
Gill was born on 29 December 1934 in Ludhiana, Punjab Province, British India in the Jat Sikh family Rachpal Singh Gill and Amrit Kaur. He was educated at St. Edward's School, Shimla and received a degree in English literature from Panjab University

== Career ==
=== 1958–1984 ===
Gill joined the Indian Police Service in 1958 and was assigned to the Assam and Meghalaya states in the northeastern India.

In the early 1980s, Gill served as Inspector General of Police in Assam. Vinayak Ganapathy, writing for Rediff.com in 2003, noted Gill's no-nonsense style of functioning, which earned him the sobriquet 'supercop' in Punjab, made him "unpopular" among influential sections of the population in Assam and called him "a controversial figure". While Director General of police in Assam, Gill was charged with kicking a demonstrator to death, but was acquitted by the Delhi High Court. Gill lived in the northeastern India for 28 years, returning to his home state of Punjab in 1984. Assamese students had knocked off Gill’s turban one time in response to him kickstarting the Assam Agitation due to kicking a demonstrator to death.

=== 1984–1995 ===
He has been called a 'supercop', for his work in Punjab, and amongst Punjabis he is generally known as the “Butcher of Punjab”; where he was the Director General of Police from 1988 to 1990 and then again from 1991 until his retirement from the Indian Police Service in 1995.

During this era when Sikh extremists in the Khalistan movement were active in Punjab, there were reports of human rights violations in the Punjab region. Amnesty International reported that, from 1983 to 1994, armed groups "struggling" to form an independent Sikh state, assassinating perpetrators of the 1984 Sikh pogroms or Congress Party members, and taking hostages. It further reported that the police responded with a crackdown, "illegally detaining, torturing and killing hundreds of young men". Human Rights Watch (HRW) reported that from the 1980s Sikh separatists were guilty of targeted assassinations and attacks upon Hindu minorities in the Punjab state. HRW also reported that the government response resulted in further serious "human rights violations against tens of thousands". HRW report in 1991 described the security forces using "increasingly brutal methods to stem the militant movement, resulting in widespread human rights violations." Thousands of civilians and suspected militants were summarily executed in "staged" encounter killings. Many "disappeared" while in police custody and thousands were detained without trial and subjected to torture. The post-1991 period coincides with Gill's second tenure as Director General of Punjab police. It is this period that witnessed the most serious escalation of violence.

In May 1988, he commanded Operation Black Thunder to flush out militants hiding in the Golden Temple. Compared to Operation Blue Star, little damage was inflicted on the Golden Temple. In what was reported as a successful operation, around 67 Sikhs surrendered and 4 were killed in the encounter. Gill stated that he did not want to repeat the mistakes made by Indian army during Operation Blue Star. In contrast to prior operations, minimum force was used under full public scrutiny.

1991 saw the peak of violence in Punjab, with more than 5000 reported killed. In 1992, the Indian government, intent on retaking Punjab from terrorism, appointed Gill as Chief of Police in Punjab. The police and army instituted a crackdown, and in 1993 the reported death toll was less than 500. In 1993, The New York Times reported, the people of Punjab no longer feared the Sikh rebels or gangs, but instead feared the army and police. Patricia Gossman describes Gill as having a goal to eliminate, not merely arrest, militant Sikh leaders and members. KPS Gill also expanded a bounty system of rewards for police who killed known militants – a practice that encouraged the police to resort to extrajudicial executions and disappearances. The police were awarded financially for killing militants. India's central government created a special fund to finance Punjab's death squads, to pay the network of informants who provided information about militants and those suspected of supporting militants, and to reward police who captured and killed them. The reward was about ₹50,000 ($1,670). In an article in India Today on 15 October 1992 it was written that the rush of claiming cash rewards is turning police into mercenaries. Besides the rewards for killing militants (annual outlay for the purpose: ₹1.13 crore [$338,000]), the department gives 'unannounced rewards' for killing unlisted militants.

Gill retired from the IPS in 1995. He was going to be employed as the Governor of Punjab, but could not due to criminal cases he was facing, and after Beant Singh was assassinated he was immediately sent off.

=== 1995–1999 ===
Gill founded the Institute for Conflict Management (ICM) and was its first president.

Gill began advising governments on counter-terrorism matters.

In 1997, the Chief minister of Assam state, Prafulla Kumar Mahanta, requested his services as security advisor. However, since the sexual harassment case against him was pending he was not able to take this appointment.

In 1999, Delhi Police arrested Richhpal Singh, who was allegedly a Babbar Khalsa suicide bomber on a mission to assassinate Gill. He arrived in Delhi from Pakistan on an Afghan passport. Two kilograms of the explosive RDX, four detonators, and some 'live wire' were recovered from him. In an interview after this incident, Gill claimed that he had been a target of four or five such assassination attempts by Babbar Khalsa and other Sikh militant groups. Gill stated that he was not afraid.

=== 2000–2004 ===
In 2000 the government of Sri Lanka sought his expertise as an anti-terrorism expert to help them draw a comprehensive counter-terrorism strategy against Liberation Tigers of Tamil Eelam He was approached by Lakshman Kadirgamar who was the foreign minister of Sri Lanka After the defeat of Liberation Tigers of Tamil Eelam the similarity in the tactics used by Sri Lanka with the tactics used by Gill in Punjab was noted in an article published in India Today

Gill was appointed as security adviser to the state of Gujarat after 2002 Gujarat violence. Gujarat Chief minister Narendra Modi, commenting on his appointment, stated, "It is good to have an experienced person such as Gill as my security advisor. Gill had very effectively tackled the Punjab terrorism problem." He requested deployment of 1,000 extra specially-trained riot police from Punjab state to combat the violence. He was credited with controlling violence after his appointment. He arrived in Gujarat on 3 May 2002 He subsequently blamed a 'small group' of people for the Gujarat riots.

In April 2003, there was a report that Gill was being considered for the position of governor of Assam. The Northeast Study Group, of which Gill is a member, had advised against assigning a state's previous security personnel to a state as governor. The Chief minister of Assam agreed.

Martin Regg Cohn argued in a Toronto Star editorial that policies followed in Punjab by Gill should be utilised in fighting the Taliban in Afghanistan. An academic paper, The Gill Doctrine: A Model for 21st Century Counterterrorism?, analysing his tactics in the successful fight against the Punjab insurgency was presented at the annual meeting of American Political Science Association on 30 August 2007.

=== 2005–2009: post-police career ===
The government of Chhattisgarh state in India appointed him a security adviser to help control Naxalites in 2006. After an attack by Naxalites killed 55 policemen in 2007, Gill commented that the issue was one of underdevelopment in police forces.

Gill also was president of the Indian Hockey Federation; in March 2008, 15 years into his tenure, India's hockey team failed to qualify for the Olympics for the first time since 1928, and his position came under pressure. Narender Batra, one of 11 IHF vice-presidents, on resigning his position over the failure to qualify, accused Gill of "autocratic functioning", and called on the entire IHF staff to step down. Gill responded that the critics were professional mourners who were proud to run down the establishment, and stated he would respond to these things at a later stage.

Alok Sinha, writing for India Times, noted that the top two executives, Gill and the Secretary-General, did not even talk to one another. There were rumours that the secretary general of the IHF, leader of the anti-Gill faction, would also resign.

Less than a month after the qualification failure, in April 2008, Aaj Tak Television reported that it had caught the Secretary-General of the IHF taking a bribe on camera to choose a player in a sting. There were renewed calls for Gill to resign.

After the allegations of corruption, the Indian Olympic Association (IOA) suspended the IHF indefinitely on 28 April 2008. IOA president Suresh Kalmadi said in a press conference, "We have great respect for KPS Gill and it is not personal."

As of September 2009, Gill remained president of the Institute for Conflict Management. As of July 2009, he was also winding up the affairs of the suspended Indian Hockey Federation as it merged with its replacement, Hockey India.

== Criminal conviction ==
A female Indian Administrative Service (IAS) officer named Rupan Deol Bajaj filed a complaint against Gill in 1988 for "patting" her "posterior" at a party where he was alleged to be drunk. In August 1996, he was convicted under Section 354 (outraging the modesty of a woman) and Section 509 (word, gesture or act intended to insult a lady), generally summarised as sexual harassment.

Gill was sentenced to pay a fine of ₹2,00,000 and to suffer three months rigorous imprisonment, followed by two months' ordinary imprisonment, and finally to serve three years of probation.

After final appeals before the Supreme Court in July 2005, the conviction was upheld but the jail sentences were reduced to probation. The victim had declined to accept the monetary compensation, and the court ordered that it be donated to women's organisations. There were other women who were also harassed by him; Rupan Deol Bajaj stated, including an English doctor who had suffered even more, but could not speak out.

== Opinion and activism ==
Gill was an outspoken critic of the Indian Government's handling of national security issues. He blamed it for soft nature and under-preparedness, and argued that policy was formed without input from anti-terrorism experts, and that the country lacked a national security policy.

== Awards and honours ==
Gill received a Padma Shri award, India's fourth-highest civilian honour, in 1989 for his work in the civil service.

== In popular culture ==
The 2026 film Satluj, based on the life of Jaswant Singh Khalra, features a senior police officer whom several media outlets have described as being inspired by Gill.

== Publications ==
Gill wrote his first book Punjab: The Knights of Falsehood in 1997 (reprinted in 2008 in paperback), covering the Punjab insurgency . The book received positive reception in the Press and was deemed to provide a great degree of authenticity to the narrative of the events. However, his political coverage was criticised as placing too much responsibility for the insurgency on the Akali Dal, while absolving the Indian National Congress.

Gill was editor of the quarterly journal of the ICM, Faultlines: Writings on Conflict and Resolution and also wrote the ICM website, South Asia Terrorism Portal.

He edited the 2001 book Terror And Containment: Perspectives on India's Internal Security with Ajai Sahni. With Sahni, he also co-authored The Global Threat of Terror: Ideological, Material & Political Linkages.

Other books published by Gill are

- Most Wanted (2002)
- The Punjab Story, (2004)
- Islam and Religious Riots A Case Study - Riots & Wrongs (2012) by R N P Singh and K P S Gill
- Kurh Phire Pardhan (2012) in Punjabi
- Punjab : The Enemies Within : Travails of a wounded land riddled with toxins, (2017) co authored with Sadhavi Khosla

== Illness and death ==
Kanwar Pal Singh Gill was admitted to Sir Ganga Ram Hospital in Delhi on 10 May 2017. He had been suffering from peritonitis but died of sudden cardiac arrest due to cardiac arrhythmia on 26 May 2017.

== See also ==
- 1987 Punjab killings
- 1991 Punjab killings
- Air India bombing
- Human rights in India
- Sumedh Singh Saini
