= List of terrorist incidents in Punjab, India =

This is a partial list of victims of violence in Punjab (India) during the 1980s and 1990s.

== During the Punjab insurgency ==
Date	Place	Incident
29 Sep 1981		Sikh separatists hijack Indian jetliner to Pakistan. All passengers rescued by Pakistani commandos.
16 October 1981	Chandigarh	IAS officer Mr. Naranjan Singh was attacked in the civil secretariat. He survived but his brother Surinder Singh ACSO of defence HQ was killed by the Sikh extremists. Several Hindu temples attacked
4 August 1982	Amritsar	A Sikh granthi, Gurbaksh Singh, hijacked an Indian Airlines Boeing 737 with a fake bomb. He surrendered peacefully after Pakistan refused permission for its landing at Lahore. The granthi had demanded $300,000, safe passage to North America, and the release of various imprisoned Sikh extremists.
20 August 1982		Manjit Singh hijacked Indian Airlines Flight 492, initially heading from Mumbai to New Delhi. Manjit demanded the pilot to fly to Lahore to refuel and head to Libya. After Pakistani authorities blocked their runway, the plane landed in Amritsar. Negotiations proceeded between the airport authorities and Manjit, in which he demanded a payment of 800,000 German marks, the transfer of power in Punjab to the Akali Dal, and the release of imprisoned Sikh granthis. He was eventually overpowered by the police and passengers in an ensuing scuffle.
October 1982	Amritsar	Sikh extremists threw a grenade at a Hindu Dusshera procession near the Golden Temple, killing 1 and injuring 60. This incident was triggered by the death of a Nihang Sikh who was shot after he attacked a police officer.
April 1983		Punjab police DIG A. S. Atwal murdered outside Harmandir Sahib, the holiest shrine of the Sikhs, and his body left to rot. He came in with his Punjab Police uniform and his gun when he was killed.
September 1983	Jagraon	Khalistani militants fire indiscriminately at people walking.
September- 5 October 1983	Dhilwan	6 passengers aboard a bus traveling from Dhilwan in Kapurthala District to Jalandhar, all of them Hindus, killed by Sikh militants in 1983 Dhilwan Bus massacre. In a separate incident, a police subinspector and a tax inspector were also killed aboard a train. A total of 20 people were left dead, and another 18 wounded in a 2-week span. By this time, more than 175 people had been killed by the militants in various incidents.
6 October 1983	Some Sikh groups announce the creation of Khalistan	President's rule is imposed by the Government of India in an attempt to bring order in Punjab.
8 October 1983		Punjab Police Are Given Broad Powers
14 October 1983		A festival bombed in Chandigarh
21 October 1983	Gobindgarh	Massacre of 58 Hindu passengers by Sikh militants. Unofficial number is more than 100 Hindus
18 Nov 1983	Kapurthala district	Nine armed men killed four Hindu bus passengers. Baba Ajit Singh, a Nihang, confronted the attackers and stopped further killings. Like in the October killings, the killers abandoned the bus at the Chitiwind village on the outskirts of Amritsar.
9 Feb 1984		Sikh militants kill two Sikh men belonging to a breakaway group, and also bomb a wedding procession
23 Feb 1984		11 Hindus pulled off trains and buses and killed by Sikh militants; 27 more wounded.
1 January 1984 to 3 June 1984	Various places in Punjab	298 Hindus had been killed officially in violence in five months preceding Operation Blue Star. unofficial number of Hindus killed was well over 500
9 April 1984	Bhatinda	A bomb explosion in a Hindu temple planted by Sikh militants wounded 3 people. A witness scheduled to testify against a Sikh militant was shot and killed by unidentified gunmen.
21 May 1984	Moga	13 Hindus killed by Sikh militants.
3 to 8 June 1984	Amritsar	more than 3000 (unofficial figure) people killed including 170 Sikh militants holed up inside the Harmandir Sahib temple complex and army troops fighting them and civilians caught in the cross fire between militants and the Indian army in Golden Temple which was termed as operation Blue Star. The total number of militants was in excess of 180 who were equipped with rocket launchers, artillery, hand grenades, and Chinese made shoulders fired missile launchers. They were led by Maj Gen Subeg Singh a disgruntled and court martialled officer of Indian army who had joined Bhindranwale and had connections with Pak Army because he had served in Bangladesh in 1971–72
12 September 1984	Batala	8 bus passengers killed.
10 and 11 May 1985	New Delhi	85 Hindus were killed in serial bomb blasts by Khalistanis which occurred during consecutive days at various places across New Delhi and its neighboring Haryana and Uttar Pradesh. 59 Hindus had died on the spot while the rest succumbed to injuries after being hospitalized. The terrorists used transistor bombs in a train and 2 buses. They also planted bombs in crowded places like Market and Public Park.
20 Aug 1985	Sherpur	Harchand Singh Longowal assassinated near sherpur Punjab.
6 March 1986	Kapurthala	13 Hindu civilians killed and 18 wounded in indiscriminate firing by Sikh militants.
27 March 1986	Amritsar	Former Communist Party of India legislator Arjan Singh Mastana and his bodyguard gunned down and several Hindus killed
28 March 1986	Ludhiana	13 people killed in indiscriminate firing in Dresi ground, killing Kharti leaders including that of Jagirpur, Mayor Krishan Sood. unofficial number of Hindus killed was 32
29 March 1986	Mallian, Jalandhar	20 labourers killed by militants.
8 June 1986	Amritsar	9 People killed by Sikh extremists.
25 July 1986	Mukatsar	15 bus passengers gunned down by suspected Sikh militants.
10 Aug 1986	Pune	Retired Army Chief of Staff, General Arun Shridhar Vaidya killed by Sikh militants.
17 Sept 1986	Phillaur	Sikh extremists kill a Shiv Sena Hindu leaders and several Hindu leaders are targeted and a hit list is published every week in Jagbani and Ajeet Punjabi newspapers for Hindu leader in politics, administration, and other government services to leave Punjab or face death for nearly all weeks between 1983 and 1985.
25 October 1986	Chandigarh	Suspected Sikh extremists opened fire in a Hindu market, killing nine and wounding ten.
30 October 1986	Hoshiarpur	Sikh militants robbed a bank, killed 5 Hindus and the unofficial number of Hindus killed was 23.
31 October 1986	Ludhiana	8 migrant and local Hindu industrial workers gunned down in indiscriminate firing on Daba road, Ludhiana. unofficial number was around 22 Hindus dead
30 November 1986	Khudda	24 Hindu bus passengers gunned down. Unofficial number was more than 50.
January 1987		Congress Sikh MLA Sant Singh Liddar murdered.
January 1987		Sikh militants kill eight people. Most of the victims were Hindus.
8 May 1987		Sukhdev Singh, the son of the moderate Akali leader Jiwan Singh Umranangal, was murdered by the militants. In 1986, Jiwan Singh had undertaken a door-to-door campaign in the Majha region, meeting the families of the militants and asking for their help in convincing the militants to give up the violence.
19 May 1987	Tarn Taran	Deepak Dhawan, the State Committee member of the CPI(M)
14 June 1987	Delhi and Punjab	Sikh militants in New Delhi killed 12 Hindus celebrating a baby's birthday party. 13 other people were killed in Punjab. Security was increased in New Delhi following reports of possible school bus bomb attacks by Sikh militants.
8 July 1987		Gurnam Singh Uppal, a moderate Sikh leader and the president of the Punjab unit of Democratic Youth Federation of India, was killed.
6 July 1987	Near Lalru	Khalistan Commando Force militants hijacked a Haryana Roadways bus and killed 38 Hindu bus passengers.
7 July 1987	Near Fatehabad	Sikh militants kill 34 Hindu bus passengers from two Haryana Roadways buses near Fatehabad
6 August 1987	Jagdev Kalan	12 people gunned down. Before shooting them victims were forced to chant "Long Live the Sikh Nation".
19 August 1987	Jalandhar	11 people killed by Sikh militants including a Hindu man and his baby son.
28 September 1987	Alawalpur	5 killed and 8 injured, firing near Geetha Bhawan.
20 October 1987	Delhi	12 persons shot dead at various places in Delhi on Diwali day.
15 January 1988	Dhadial Nijhran, village near Batala	8 members of a family including 2 women and 3 children killed
22 January 1988	Punjab	12 people and a Hindu leader killed by Sikh extremists.
19 February 1988	Gurdaspur, Hoshiarpur and Patiala	Bombs exploded by Babbar Khalsa. 12 to 13 persons killed and nearly 50 injured.
2 March 1988	Bhaian, Gurdaspur district	8 members of a family killed.
3 March 1988	Kahri sahri	35 persons shot dead, 50 others injured, indiscriminate firing at a festival gathering by terrorists believed to be Sikh militants.
29 March 1988	Bhathe (Kartarpur)	2 Persons shot dead by militants
31 March 1988	Rajbah	18 members of a Rajput family shot dead at village the Rajbah under police station.
2 April 1988	Punjab	Sikh gunmen stormed into huts and houses across Punjab state and killed 37 people, including 7 children
15 May 1988	Samana, Patiala	26 persons killed, 100 others injured in different incidents
16 May 1988	Amritsar, Ludhiana, Jalandhar and Gurdaspur	40 persons gunned down, 100 others injured in different incidents
17 May 1988	Kharar	35 labourers massacred.
24 May 1988	Dhaliwal (Nakodar)	6 members of a family murdered.
19–21 June 1988	Punjab and Haryana	3 bomb explosions took place over the course of 3 consecutive days. The week prior witnessed a bomb explosion in Amristar in the vicinity of the Shivala Bhaiyan Temple. 22 people were killed and 40 were injured, the terrorists specifically chose Monday, considered a particularly auspicious day to worship Lord Shiva, as the day to attack. The second Amristar explosion took place in a predominantly Hindu textile market, killing 28 and injuring 50. In Haryana, Sikh terrorists set off a bomb near a TV shop where people congregated to watch the Ramayana, killing 20 people. The third bomb explosion was in New Delhi and targeted a vegetable market, killing 3 and injuring 42. Sikh terrorists further gunned down 6 people in a cinema hall in Pehowa, Haryana. The motive of these attacks was to incite a Hindu backlash and exacerbate communal tensions between both communities.
22 June 1988	Raman Mandi, Bathinda	Social Worker Baldev Raj Mittal gunned down
7 September 1988	Rure Aasal (Amritsar district)	15 rail passengers killed, 25 injured at Rure Aasal railway station.
8 January 1989		Sikh terrorists killed 14 Hindus after the hanging of the two men responsible for the assassination of Indira Gandhi.
25 June 1989	Moga	27 Swayamsevaks of the RSS who were participating in the daily shakha conducted at Nehru Park were shot dead by some Khalistani terrorists who came on motorcycles, raised provocative slogans and started firing indiscriminately.
11 Nov 1989	Patiala	19 students of Thapar Engineering College were massacred while they slept in their dorm by Sikh Extremists.
19 January 1990	Ballagan, Amritsar	8 Hindu villagers shot down by militants
7 March 1990	Abohar	32 shot dead in indiscriminate firing at crowded market
30 May 1990	Ferozepur	Sikh extremists kill 10 in attack on market.
28 May 1990		Khalistan Commando Force attacked a farm, Killed 13 migrant workers, including 11 Hindus.
17 November 1990	Killianwali District Muktsar	Militants associated with the Khalistan separatist movement opened fire on a Rashtriya Swayamsevak Sangh (RSS) morning assembly, killing 11 people mostly children.
22 November 1990	Aliwal BATALA gsp	Bank dacoity in Aliwal and Guard killed
November 1990	Amritsar	Sikh militants killed 23 Hindus in multiple attacks.
15 June 1991	Ludhiana district	1991 Punjab killings; 110 passengers killed by Sikh militants.
11 March 1992	Harkishanpura	16 Hindu workers killed by Sikh militants.
15 March 1992	Ludhiana	18 people killed by Sikh militants.
3 May 1992	Ludhiana	Prem Kumar Goel, a Judicial Magistrate in Jagraon (Ludhiana), and his wife were assassinated by terrorists on May 3, 1992. The attack occurred near Pabbian village in Jagraon.
10 August 1992	Barnala	31 people killed by Sikh militants.
6 January 1993	Chhichhrewal (Gurdaspur)	11 Terrorists encountered
11 September 1993	Chandigarh	12 people killed in bomb blast that was an assassination attempt on Youth Congress(I) Punjab minister Maninderjit Bitta.
25 February 1994	Rajasthan	Leader of Khalistan Liberation Force Navneet Singh Khadian encountered by Punjab Police
31 August 1995	Chandigarh	Punjab's Chief Minister Beant Singh belonging to Congress party along with 17 others killed by a suicide bomber

== After end of Punjab insurgency ==
On 31 August 1995, Chief minister Beant Singh was killed by a suicide bomber. The pro-Khalistan group Babbar Khalsa claimed responsibility for the assassination, but "security authorities" were reported to be doubtful of the truth of that claim. A 2006 press release by the Embassy of the United States in New Delhi indicated that the responsible organization was the Khalistan Commando Force.

The Indian Express reported in its online edition on 19 June 2006 that the Khalistan Zindabad Force was behind bomb blasts in Jalandhar, India, at the Inter-State Bus Terminus that left three people killed and injured 12. A police spokesman said the attack was planned by a pair of KZF leaders, one based in Pakistan and one in Canada, and executed by a "local criminal".

On 22 May 2005, Consecutive bomb blasts took place in the Liberty cinema and Satyam cinema in New Delhi during the screening of the movie Jo Jo Bole So Nihaal (film) in which 3 people died and dozens were injured. The movie was being opposed by a section of intellectual Sikhs.

On 14 October 2007, six people were killed and 32 injured in a bomb blast at Shingaar cinema hall, Ludhiana.

On 24 September 2009, the Punjab Police arrested two Babbar Khalsa militants involved in the assassination of Rulda Singh, president of the Punjab Rashtriya Sikh Sangat who was shot at and seriously injured by two unidentified persons at his residence near New Grain market on 29 July.

2016–17 targeted killings in Punjab, India: multiple attacks on Hindu leaders of Shiv Sena, Rashtriya Swayamsevak Sangh and BJP happened during the years 2016–17. Six leaders of these organisations were killed.

== See also ==
- Punjab insurgency
- Human rights abuses in Punjab, India
- Kharku
- Operation Blue Star
- Operation Woodrose
- Operation Black Thunder
- 1991 Punjab killings
- 1987 Punjab killings
- Moga Massacre (1989)
- Terrorism in India
- List of designated terrorist groups
- List of organisations banned by the Government of India
- List of terrorist incidents in India

== Bibliography ==
- Knights of Falsehood, KPS Gill, 1997
- Global security watch, Satyapal Dang, 2008
- Sikhs Slay 13 Hindus in Punjab, United Press International, 29 March 1986
- Sikh Extremists Open Fire on Top Punjab Police Official, 4 October 1986 The New York Times
