= Jaswant Singh Khalra =

Indian human rights activist (1952–1995)

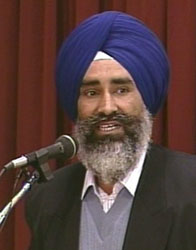
- Jaswant Singh Khalra speaking at Gurudwara Sahib in Canada
- Born: 1952; Khalra, Punjab, India
- Died: 1995 (aged 42–43); Chabhal Kalan, Punjab, India
- Cause of death: Extrajudicial execution
- Occupations: Human rights activist, General Secretary of Human Rights Wing of Shiromani Akali Dal
- Spouse: Paramjit Kaur Khalra

Jaswant Singh Khalra (1952–1995) was an Indian human rights activist. He was one of the most prominent human rights activists in Punjab. He gained international recognition after uncovering evidence of thousands of alleged extrajudicial killings, enforced disappearances and illegal cremations carried out by the Punjab Police during the insurgency in Punjab, India.

His investigation documented approximately 25,000 illegal cremations and alleged that around 2,000 police personnel who refused to participate in unlawful killings had themselves been killed, Khalra's work drew the attention of international human rights organizations, including Amnesty International and became one of the most significant human rights investigations concerning Punjab in the 1990s.

Khalra was abducted from outside his home in Amritsar on 6 September 1995 and was subsequently murdered. His killing became a landmark human rights case in India, culminating in the conviction and life imprisonment of six Punjab Police officials for his abduction and murder. His death has since become a symbol of the struggle for truth, accountability and justice in Punjab.

== Activism ==
Jaswant Singh Khalra was the director of a bank in the city of Amritsar in Punjab during the militancy period in Punjab. Following Operation Blue Star, the assassination of Indira Gandhi, and the 1984 anti-Sikh riots, the police were empowered to detain suspects for any reason, ostensibly as suspected terrorists. The police were accused of killing unarmed suspects in staged shootouts and burning thousands of dead bodies to cover up the murders.

Khalra was investigating four major cases at one time and continued to collect evidence and witnesses. These cases included the custodial killing of Behla, the human-shield case concerning the death of seven civilians, the cremation of 25,000 unidentified bodies in Punjab, and that police had killed about 2,000 police officers not collaborating in counter-terror operations. The Central Bureau of Investigation, a union government agency, concluded that police had unlawfully cremated 2,097 people in Tarn Taran district alone.

As per CBI investigation records quoted by Supreme Court (speaking through Sathasivam J and Chauhan J in Prithpal Singh v State of Punjab) he was a human rights activist working on the abduction, elimination, and cremation of unclaimed human bodies during the insurgency period in Indian Punjab. The court observed that the police had been eliminating young persons under the pretext of being militants and disposing of their bodies without record.

While searching for some colleagues who went missing, Khalra discovered files from the municipal corporation of Amritsar which contained the names, ages, and addresses of those who had been killed and later burnt by the police. Further research revealed cases in 3 other districts in Punjab, increasing the list by thousands.

The National Human Rights Commission released a list of some of the identified bodies that were cremated by the police in the Police Districts of Amritsar, Majitha, and Tarn Taran between June 1984 and December 1994. The Supreme Court of India and the National Human Rights Commission of India have certified the validity of this data.

Jaswant Singh Khalra asserted there could have been over 25,000 Sikhs illegally killed and cremated by the state. To date, families of those who "disappeared" during the insurgency are awaiting confirmation of the fate of their missing loved ones. A list of names has been published by Tribune India.

Jaswant supported a theocratic Sikh state, noted particularly in his own article, The Game Of Elections - Should It Be Played Or Not? which was originally published in Liberation Khalistan (February 1992). In the article, he considered the assassins Satwant Singh and Kehar Singh as Khalistani heeray (diamonds). He had in fact, founded the monthly magazine 'Liberation Khalistan' in 1992 & served as both its editor and primary writer.

== Family ==
Khalra's grandfather, Harnam Singh, was an activist in the Ghadar movement for the independence of India. Harnam Singh was also one of 376 passengers of the ship, Komagata Maru which famously sailed from British-Hong Kong, via Shanghai, China, and Yokohama, Japan, to Vancouver, Canada, in 1914, carrying 376 passengers from Punjab, British India. Of them, 24 were admitted to Canada, but the other 352 passengers were not allowed to disembark in Canada, and the ship was forced to return to India. Harnam Singh, among others, was arrested upon their arrival and was tried in the Lahore conspiracy case against the British empire and was later imprisoned at Lahore jail.

In 1975, the Punjab government offered pensions and honours to freedom fighters families, Khalra opposed accepting any recognition for his grandfather's role in the Ghadar movement.

Jaswant Singh's wife, Paramjit Kaur Khalra, has continued her husband's activism and is a noted human rights activist herself. Jaswant Singh' had two children, Navkiran Kaur and Janmeet Singh. Other living family members include his father Kartar Singh, mother Mukhtar Kaur, three brothers Rajinder Singh Sandhu, Amarjeet Singh Sandhu (both live in the United Kingdom) and Gurdev Singh Sandhu (lives in Austria) and five sisters: Paritam Kaur, Mohinder Kaur, Harjinder Kaur (retired BEO) Balbir Kaur (retired headteacher) and Beant Kaur.

== Murder ==
On 6 September 1995, while he was washing his car in front of his house, Khalra was abducted by personnel of Punjab Police and taken to Jhabal Police Station. Although witnesses gave statements implicating the police, and named Director General of the Punjab Police, Kanwar Pal Singh Gill as a conspirator, police have denied ever arresting or detaining Khalra. Further, the police have claimed to have had no knowledge of his whereabouts.

In 1996, the Central Bureau of Investigation found evidence that he was held at a police station in Tarn Taran and recommended the prosecution of nine Punjab Police officials for murder and kidnapping. Those accused of his murder were not charged for ten years, though one of the suspects, Senior Superintendent of Police Ajit Singh Sandhu was murdered in 1997. However, his murder was staged as a suicide. On 18 November 2005, six Punjab police officials were convicted. Two defendants, Deputy Superintendent Jaspal Singh and Amarjit Singh, were sentenced to life imprisonment and the others to seven years imprisonment for Khalra's abduction and murder. On 16 October 2007, a division bench of Punjab and Haryana High Court, chaired by Justices Mehtab Singh Gill and A. N. Jindal, extended the sentence to life imprisonment for the other four accused: Satnam Singh, Surinder Pal Singh, Jasbir Singh (all former sub inspectors) and Prithipal Singh (former head constable).

On 11 April 2011, the Supreme Court of India dismissed the appeal filed against the sentence to life imprisonment for the four accused, scathingly criticizing the atrocities committed by Punjab Police during the disturbance period.

== Legacy ==
In September 2020, The Shiromani Gurdwara Parbandhak Committee and other Sikh institutions have commemorated Khalra as "Shaheed Bhai Jaswant Singh Khalra" and have held annual shaheedi samagams in his memory.

In March 2013, Canada's New Democratic Party had adopted a convention resolution commemorating him and promoting awareness of his investigation into enforced disappearances in Punjab.

In September 2025, The Government of British Columbia officially proclaimed September 6, 2025, as Jaswant Singh Khalra Day.

In April 2026, Peel Art Gallery, Museum and Archives in Ontario, Canada, organised the 'Challenging the Darkness - Jaswant Singh Khalra' exhibition during Sikh Heritage Month honouring 30 years since his death.

=== School ===
In June 2025, the Jaswant Singh Khalra Elementary School opened in Fresno, California, becoming the first elementary school in the United States to be named in honour of Sikh human rights activist Jaswant Singh Khalra.

In June 2025, the Jaswant Singh Khalra Khalsa School was inaugurated in Brampton, Ontario, Canada, as a Sikh faith based school established in memory of Khalra. The school announced that its first academic session would begin in September 2025.

=== Memorial ===
The City Council of Fresno approved the proposal to rename Victoria Park after Jaswant Singh Khalra on 26 August 2017. After bringing the motion before the City Council, the council member Oliver Baines said, "Jaswant Singh Khalra for Punjabi/Sikh Community is like Martin Luther King Jr. for my community."

=== Film ===
Satluj, a 2026 Indian is based on the life of Khalra, with Diljit Dosanjh portraying Khalra. Though it was initially named as Ghalughara (from ghallughara meaning "massacre") and Punjab '95, the Censor Board raised objections on the film and production unit, demanding 127 cuts and a new title. The release of the film was subsequently delayed indefinitely, until it was finally released on ZEE5, on July 3, 2026, without any cuts. However, the Indian government banned the film and it was taken down within 48 hours. This prompted guerilla screenings in Punjab and surrounding states.

== See also ==
- Timeline of the insurgency in Punjab, India
- List of murder convictions without a body
- Lists of solved missing person cases
