= 1986 Punjab Bus massacre =

1986 Punjab Bus massacre may refer to

- 1986 Muktsar Bus massacre of 14 Hindu and one Sikh bus-passenger by pro-Khalistan Sikh anti-Government militants.
- 1986 Hoshiarpur Bus massacre of 24 Hindu bus-passengers by pro-Khalistan Sikh anti-Government militants.
