= Kharku =

Sikh militants of the Punjab insurgency of the 1980s and 1990s

Kharku (Punjabi: ਖਾੜਕੂ (Gurmukhi), کھاڑکو (Shahmukhi); khāṛakū, khaarakoo; literally meaning bold, feared, or domineering; alternatively spelt as Kharaku) is a Punjabi term used as a self-designation by Sikh militants of the Punjab insurgency who were followers of the Khalistan movement. They were also known as Uggravadi.

== History ==
During the later years of British India and early decades following Indian independence, some slogans were coined during those times which invoked another similar sounding word to serve a political message, an example being "Khaṇḍā khaṛkū, Náirū pàjju", meaning: "When the double edged swords begin to clatter, Nehru shall run". The Kharkus fought an insurgency primarily between the years of 1978–1993, sparked by the 1978 Sikh-Nirankari clash, which led to the deaths of 13 Khalsa Sikhs.

Their ultimate goal was the establishment of a sovereign Sikh state (Khalsa Raj) based upon political justice. The movement gained further strength in the 1980s after Operation Blue Star, Operation Woodrose, and Operation Black Thunder, and fallout from the assassination of Indira Gandhi, which sparked country-wide anti-Sikh pogroms. The Kharkus of the 1980s and 1990s were associated with martyrdom and respected as shaheeds (martyrs for a religious cause). The Kharku movement was especially strong in rural areas of Punjab. The ranks of militants drew primarily from the Majha region from those belonging to a lower socio-economic status and Jat and Ramgharia background.

They were generally supported by the Sikh masses, especially during the beginning of the insurgency. Support waned during the latter years until the movement faded, eventually relegated to the underground. The reasons for their decline are a lack of common vision, lack of a commitment to a worthwhile cause, and losing trust of the common folk. Hundreds of Kharkus were killed by police and military forces during the insurgency. Many of those who survive remain in hiding or have escaped abroad. Many photographs of the corpses of militants were taken during the insurgency, with a ritualistic and symbolistic photograph tradition known as muh dekhna developing centered around the concept of shaheedi.

== Terminology ==
=== Etymology ===
Kharku is etymologically derived from the word 'kharag' (honed), which originally referred to an iron scimitar.

=== Other names ===
They were also referred to as 'Kharku Singhs' or simply as 'Mundey' (boys). Other terms for them were 'Jujharu' (hardworker), 'Jangju Sikhs' (fighter), 'freedom fighters', and even 'Khalistani mujahideens'. Controversially, the term is also used by some to describe Sikh terrorists who indiscriminately massacred local Hindus and other innocent civilians. Kharkus viewed themselves as revolutionaries rather than as terrorists. The English-language media outlets and the government referred to the militants as 'Uggarwadi' (ferocious).

=== Titles ===
Kharkus took titles and names quite seriously and it was risky for media outlets to report on individual Kharkus without using their preferred terminology and honorifics. They were against being labelled as "militants" or "terrorists" ('dehshatpasand', 'dehshatgard, or 'atankawadi') and demanded that Sikh honorifical terms, such as "Bhai", "Sant", and "Sardar", be appended as prefixes when reporting their names. Journalists and editors who dared to not heed these demands put their life in danger.

== See also ==
- List of terrorist incidents in Punjab, India
- List of actions attributed to KCF
- Timeline of the Punjab insurgency
- List of Pro-khalistan movement organizations
- Martyrdom in Sikhism
- Punjabi Suba movement
- Dharam Yudh Morcha
- Anandpur Sahib Resolution
- Sutlej Yamuna link canal
- Jarnail Singh Bhindranwale
- National Security Guard, commonly known as 'Black Cats'
- Khalsa bole
- Encounter killing
- Babbar Akali movement
