= 2014 Jamalpur Encounter =

Jamalpur Fake Encounter case is ongoing Criminal case in Jamalpur Area, Ludhiana, Punjab state of India took place on and involved fake encounter killing of two Dalit brothers: Harinder Singh(23) and Jatinder Singh(25). Punjab Police suspended three police officers, including SSP for killing both youths in Jamalpur. The case came in limelight after involvement of Gurjit Singh, a member of Shiromani Akali Dal(Badal) with Punjab Police.

== Detail ==
The two brothers Harinder Singh and Jatinder Singh were residents of village Bhoapur, near Machhiwara, and belonged to a Dalit caste. They were pursuing graduation from a private college near Samrala and were district-level Kabaddi players. Both brothers have criminal history, booked for attempt to murder, trespassing, assault and molestation of girl, in 2013/14 but their family call these cases fake.

In Jamalpur, both brothers were staying in rented house with two more accomplice. They were attacked by Constable Yadwinder Singh, two Home Guards Baldev Singh and Ajit Singh, with Akali member Gurjit Singh, Machhiwara. Gurjit Singh, a landlord and member of Shiromani Akali Dal is also accused of this encounter, who is believed to be with police when this happens. Gurjit's wife, Rajwinder Kaur contested Sarpanch elections for same party.

== Protests ==
Aam Aadmi Party, Punjab demand CBI inquiry in this case. AAP's Punjab convener Sucha Singh said that police involvement in the crime has already been established and it points to a well-planned conspiracy and planned demonstrations in various districts of Punjab

Family members also blocked Ludhiana Chandigarh Highway, raised slogans against the police, accusing them of caste-related violence as Gurjit is a Jat and both youths were Dalit and he did not want them to surpass.

== Action against Officials ==
The cops were expecting a reward for killing the brothers who were wanted in a case of attempt to murder. But constable, along with both home guards have been dismissed from service. Manjinder Singh, SHO Machchiwara Police Station, has also been dismissed. Harsh Kumar Bansal, SSP of Khanna district, has been suspended for dereliction of duty. A case under the SC/ST Act was also registered against the accused.

== Investigations ==
On 14 October 2014, The Special Investigation team started investigation against two dalit Youths in Bhoapur, Jamalpur Area and Takhran Khokhran (Village of Akali Leader Gurjit Singh). Village of boys supporting them whereas Gurjit's village calling boys the face of terror. Two girls hailing from Village Bhoapur and Iraq reported to police station against both brothers for molestation.

== See also ==
- Human rights abuses in Punjab, India
