= Moga =

Moga may refer to:

== Acronyms ==
- Molybdopterin adenylyltransferase, an enzyme
- MOGA, the video game controller series by PowerA
- Modern girl, shortened to moga in Japanese
- Multi-objective genetic algorithm, an algorithm for multiple objective optimization
- Oldham Make Oldham Great Again

== Geography ==
- Moga district, in Panjab, India
  - Moga, Punjab, a city and municipality in the district
- Moga, Iran, a village in Hormozgan Province, Iran

== People ==
- Moga, alternate name of the Indo-Scythian king Maues
  - Moga inscription, an archaeological artifact found in the area of Taxila, Gandhara, Pakistan

=== Surname ===
- Eva Moga (born 1968), Spanish alpine skier who competed in the 1988 Winter Olympics
- Marius Moga (born 1981), Romanian music producer, composer, and singer
- James Moga (born 1983), South Sudanese association football player (Indian I-League)
- Sergiu Moga (born 1992), Romanian association football player (Liga I)
- Tautau Moga (born 1993), Australian rugby league footballer (National Rugby League) of Samoan descent
- Vasile Moga (1774–1845), Romanian bishop

== Others ==
- Moga (mascot), mascot for the 2023 National Games of India

== See also ==
- Mogas (disambiguation)
