= Mohammad Izhar Alam =

Indian Police official (1948–2021)

- Born: 4 August 1948; Sitamarhi, Bihar, India
- Died: 6 July 2021 (aged 72); Malerkotla
- Occupation: Police official
- Years active: 1964–2015
- Known for: Alam Sena
- Spouse: Farzana Nesara Khatun
- Children: 5
- Awards: Padma Shri

Mohammad Izhar Alam (4 August 1948 – 6 July 2021) was the director general of police of the state of Punjab. According to a paper released from the US Embassy in New Delhi on 19 December 2005, during Alam's tenure as the head of the state police, he is reported to have fostered a combat force called "Fauj-e-Alam" (Alam's Army), composed of around 150 dismissed police officials and reformed Sikh insurgents, to work alongside the Punjab police ranks. The force is alleged to have been engaged in torture and extrajudicial killings of insurgents from 1984 to 1994.

After superannuation from the police force, Alam became the chairman of the Wakf Board, the state unit of the Central Wakf Council. He also entered politics and attempted to contest the 2012 assembly elections from Malerkotla constituency on Akali Dal ticket, but withdrew when he faced opposition from a faction of the party. Farzana Nissara Khatoon, his wife, replaced him in the elections and was successful. The government of India awarded Alam the fourth-highest civilian honour, Padma Shri, in 1987.

== See also ==
- Punjab insurgency
- Khalistan movement
