= 1987 Fatehabad bus massacre =

Massacre in Haryana, India

1987 Fatehabad bus killings
- Part of Insurgency in Punjab
- Location: Near Fatehabad, Punjab, India
- Date: 7 July 1987 (IST)
- Target: Hindus
- Deaths: 34
- Injuries: 18
- Perpetrator: Khalistani militants (Alleged)
- Motive: Retaliation for killing of Sikhs during the anti-insurgency operations, Persecution of Hindus

On 7 July 1987, Khalistani militants killed 34 Hindus on two buses near Fatehabad in the Hisar district (now part of Fatehabad district) of Haryana, India. The same attackers may have been involved in the Lalru bus massacre a day earlier.

== The first bus ==
On the evening of 7 July 1987, the attackers drove a jeep hired from Hanumangarh in the neighbouring state of Rajasthan. They were seen trailing the Firozpur-Delhi bus sometime before 7:10 pm, when it resumed its journey after boarding passengers at Sirsa. Two of the attackers boarded the bus as passengers. Around 12 km before Fatehabad, the jeep overtook the bus and blocked its way. Three men from the jeep, armed with guns, entered the bus, and their two accomplices also pulled out their weapons. The five men hijacked the bus, and killed the driver Jagdish. Ram Phal, the bus conductor, escaped through the window.

The hijackers started driving the bus slowly towards Fatehabad, and told the passengers to hand over their cash and valuables. Around 2 km later, they stopped the bus near Dariyapur (or Daryapur) village, where they opened fire at the passengers, and left the scene. 30 people were killed in the attack. Some of the passengers survived by hiding under the dead and the dying. 19-year old Jale Singh, one of the passengers, drove the bus to Fatehabad based on his tractor-driving experience.

== The second bus ==
After leaving the first bus, the attackers stopped an Ambassador car, shot the driver dead, and drove the car towards Fatehabad. Around 1 km later, they stopped another Haryana Roadways bus going to Sirsa. This time, they did not board the overcrowded bus, and fired at the passengers from outside, possibly because they were in a hurry to leave. The shooting left 34 people dead. Apart from the 34 dead, 18 people from the two buses were injured in the attack.

The attackers then hijacked a truck, and drove to the Punjab border via Fatehabad and Ratia. The truck was found at the Marianwala village near Batala; its various parts including the engine and the tires, were missing.

== Possible connection to the Lalru killings ==
The Fatehabad killings took place a day after the 1987 Lalru bus massacre in the neighbouring Punjab. Like in the Lalru killings, the attackers were five men in their early-to-mid 20s, and most of them were clean-shaven. In both incidents, the attackers used another vehicle to block and stop the bus: this tactic had not been used in the earlier similar killings in the Punjab-Haryana area. In both cases, the killers looted the passengers, and escaped in a truck. According to the police, in both the incidents, the attackers used Chinese automatic rifles. Despite these similarities, both Haryana and Punjab Police played down the possibility of the same gang being behind both the attacks. According to journalists Tavleen Singh and Sreekant Khandekar, the police did this because they did not want to admit their incompetence.

== Reactions ==
Subsequently, there were reports of attacks on Sikh-owned shops in Haryana, and of 12 buses being vandalized. Protest strikes affected Chandigarh, Shimla, Hisar, and many other towns in Punjab, Haryana, and the neighbouring Himachal Pradesh.

President of India Zail Singh, a Sikh, condemened the killings as "inhuman and ghastly". Prime Minister Rajiv Gandhi described the incident as "inhuman butchery" and declared that it would strengthen the government's resolve to fight the extremists.

== See also ==
- List of terrorist incidents in Punjab, India
- List of bus killings during Punjab insurgency
