= Mogas =

Mogas may refer to:

- Motor gasoline, a slang for common gasoline (for cars, motorcycles, lawnmowers ...) used by aviators to distinguish it from avgas (aviation gasoline).
- MOGAS Group, a Ugandan oil company
- Mogas 90 FC, a Beninese football club

== See also ==
- Moga (disambiguation)
