= Lalru railway station =

Railway station in Punjab, India

Lalru Railway Station
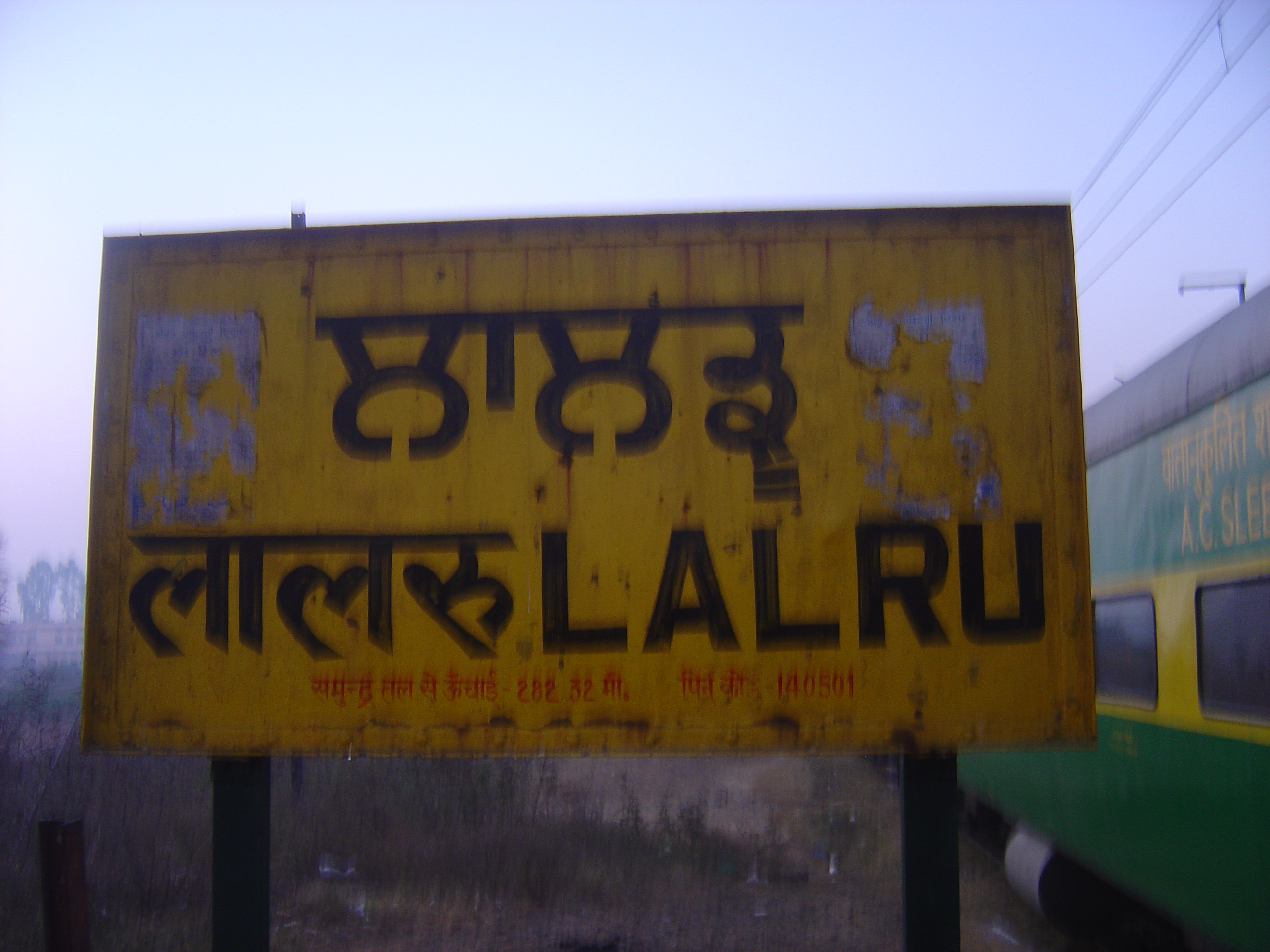

General information
- Location: Lalru, Punjab, India
- Coordinates: 30.4795°N 76.7942°E
- Elevation: 282.32 metres (926.2 ft)
- System: Indian Railways station
- Owner: Ministry of Railways, Indian Railways
- Operator: Northern Railways
- Line: Delhi–Kalka line
- Platforms: 2
- Tracks: 2 (double electrified BG)

Construction
- Structure type: Standard (on-ground station)
- Parking: Yes
- Cycle facilities: Yes

Other information
- Station code: LLU
- Zone(s): Northern Railways
- Division(s): Ambala
Location
- Location within India Location within Punjab

Lalru railway station is a railway station in Sahibzada Ajit Singh Nagar district in the Indian state of Punjab on the Northern Railways network. Its code is LLU. It serves Lalru town. The station consists of two platforms. The platforms are not well sheltered. It lacks many facilities, including water and sanitation. It is a small station which is visited by about seven passenger trains.

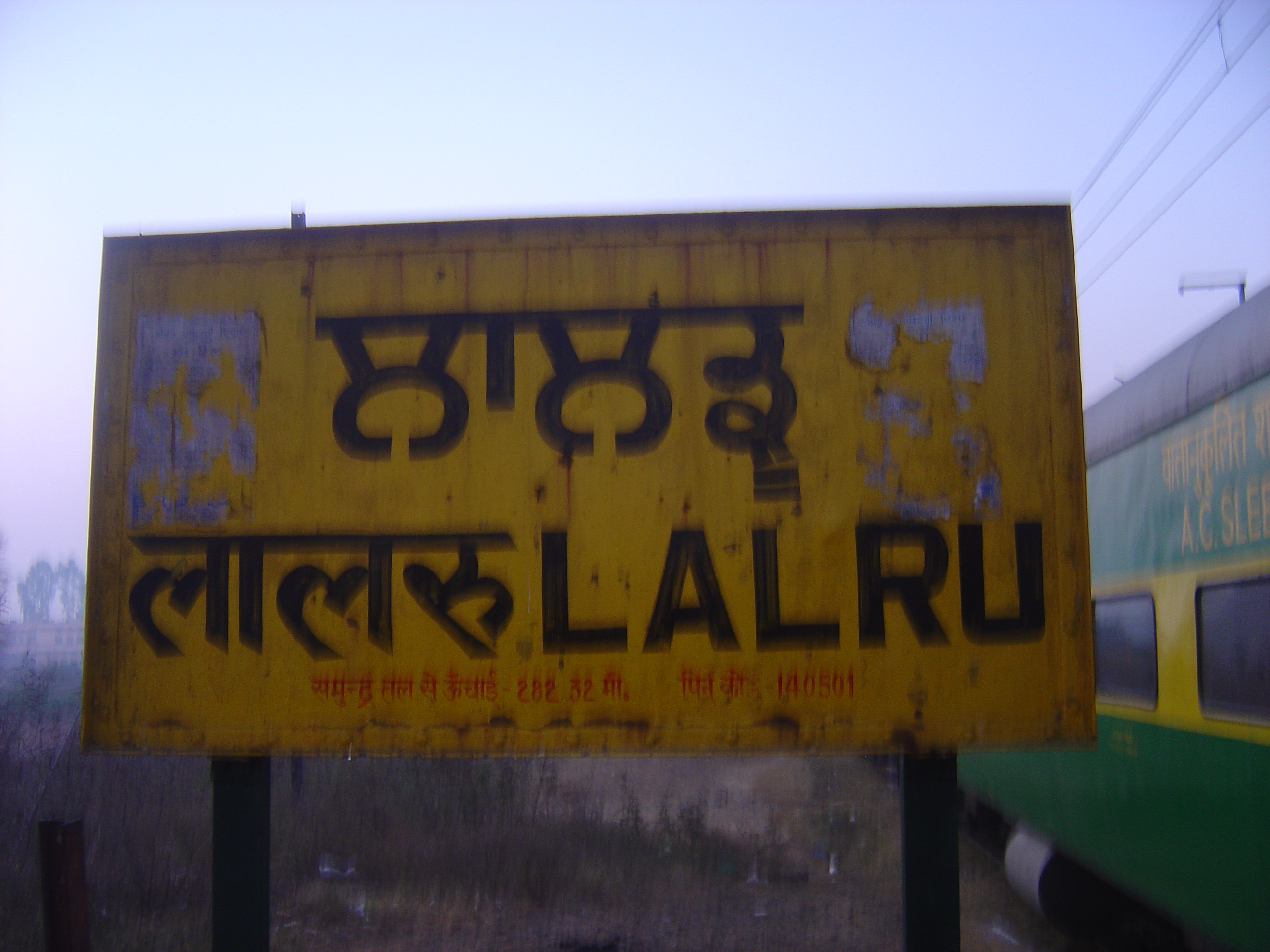
Ajmer–Chandigarh Garib Rath Express at Lalru station

== Trains ==
Some of the trains that run from Lalru are:

- Ambala–Nangal Dam Passenger (unreserved)
- Kalka–Delhi Passenger (unreserved)
- Amb Andaura–Ambala DMU
- Kalka–Ambala Passenger (unreserved)
- Ambala–Kalka Shuttle (unreserved)
