= Afsir Karim =

Indian Army general (1934–2019)

Major General Afsir Karim AVSM
- Born: January 26, 1934
- Died: February 12, 2019 (aged 85)
- Military career
- Allegiance: India
- Branch: Indian Army
- Service years: 1954 – 31 May 1989
- Rank: Major General
- Service number: IC-6880
- Commands: Eastern Command; Northern Command; Southern Command
- Conflicts: Indo-Pakistani War of 1971
- Other work: Author

Major General Afsir Karim, was an Indian Army general and military scholar who has authored several books on strategic affairs & military studies. He was a graduate of the Defense Services Staff College, Wellington and the National Defence College.

== Army career ==
General Karim was commissioned in the Indian Army in June 1954. He was a veteran of the 1962, 1965 and 1971 wars; he commanded a Para Battalion during the 1971 India-Pakistan War in the Eastern theatre. In 1978, he assumed command of an infantry brigade in Kashmir on the Line of Control. In May 1984, he took over command of an infantry division under India's Southern Army Command, and was promoted to major general on 16 September.

A specialist of issues related to terrorism, he has authored a number of books - Sri Lanka Crisis (co-author 1990); Counter-Terrorism: The Pakistan Factor (1991); Transnational Terrorism: Danger in the South (1995); Story of the Airborne Forces (1995) and Kashmir: The Troubled Frontiers (1994).He was also the founder-editor of AAKROSH, a journal on terrorism and internal conflicts and a former editor of the premier Indian defense publication Indian Defense Review. He was a life trustee of the Forum for Strategic & Security Studies.

Karim has written extensively on Kashmir and he authored Op-Topac, the semi-fictional account of Pakistan's game plan for Kashmir. In 2007 he wrote An analysis of the turmoil in Jammu and Kashmir.

He was a member of India's National Security Advisory Board (1999–2001), and was awarded the AVSM for distinguished service of an exceptional order by the Indian government for his military service.

He retired from the Indian Army on 31 May 1989 and died on 12 February 2019 after a struggle with cancer.
