= 1983 Dhilwan bus massacre =

Massacre in Punjab, India

The 1983 Dhilwan Bus massacre was an uninvestigated, unsolved, and unclaimed incident on 6 October 1983, in which 6 Hindus were shot dead by "'unidentified' extremists" purported by the media to have been Sikh. The victims were taken off a bus going from Dhilwan in Kapurthala district to Jalandhar, in the northern state of Punjab, India.

== Background ==
In the wake of deteriorating negotiations between Indira Gandhi and various Sikh groups during the Dharam Yudh Morcha, armed incidents flared up in the weeks of September-October 1983, in which 20 people were killed and another 18 were wounded.

== Incident ==
According to media reports, the perpetrators asked the 20 passengers aboard to declare their religious affiliation, and subsequently lined up 7 Hindu men and shot them. One of them, while shot, pretended to be dead. Two Hindu passengers, a 16 year old teenager and his mother, were spared. According to former Punjab DGP Kirpal Dhillon, the incident was characterized by several unusual circumstances: the perpetrators had never been seriously tracked, the bus had not been a scheduled service and had deviated from its usual route, and the victims did not belong to sects and castes typical of the area, noting the possibility of it being authorized by Congress ministers and managed through the police and central agency.

=== Media ===
The entire spectrum of Sikh groups condemned the incident "in the strongest possible terms." Nevertheless, a section of the regional Jalandhar media "ran amuck," persisting in insinuating Sikh militant involvement, declaring that "Bhindranwale's Sikhs" had opened hostilities against all Hindus," and that the incident was an attempt to compel Hindus to flee Punjab, according to journalist and Indira Gandhi biographer Inder Malhotra. Despite the incidents never being solved, the media and subsequent public opinion would be convinced of this narrative. Bhindranwale would state, "It suits the government to publicize me as an extremist, thus making an excuse to frustrate the just cause and the legitimate demands of the entire Sikh community and Punjab state."

The spate of incidents in 1983, including Dhilwan, the first of its kind, were widely suspected to be false flags; the political magazine Surya, patronized by the BJP party, substantiated many such suspicions in detailed reports about the role of the Third Agency, detailing the career trajectories of various operatives and plans to replicate the "Punjab model" to other burgeoning conflict zones, including Sri Lanka.

== Aftermath ==
Following the incident, the Congress led State government of Darbara Singh was finally dismissed by Zail Singh. and President's Rule was imposed by Indira Gandhi on 6 October, allowing no time for investigation into the unclaimed act. In addition to President's rule, Punjab would also come under the AFSPA in 1983, granting the army unrestrained powers, including to shoot on suspicion with immunity from prosecution. Terrorist incidents resumed even after the consequential massacre. On October 21, a passenger train was derailed, the ensuing collision killed 19 people. On November 18, another bus was hijacked and 4 Hindu passengers were murdered. Following President's rule, thousands of suspected Sikh extremists were apprehended by security forces. The operations elicited strong condemnation from the Akali Dal, who drew parallels between the government's actions and the sanguinary history between the Mughals and Sikhs.

=== Reactions ===
Harchand Singh Longowal "was quick" to condemn the incident. He described the incident "as an anti-national and anti-Sikh act". the incidents prompted open Akali allegations that killings were being done by professionals under the orders of the Third Agency, an intelligence wing formed by Indira Gandhi during the Emergency, looking for a pretext to impose President's rule in Punjab. Longowal himself repeatedly challenged the Government that he would prove that the Dhilwan shootings were not done by any Sikh or Akali if a judicial enquiry was conducted.

Bhindranwale, as well as all militant groups, would "squarely and unequivocally" condemn the bus shootings, the 20 October train derailment, and all fatal incidents, demanding a judicial inquiry into the spate of events during the month. Even radical Sikh groups, which normally did not shy away from claiming responsibility for violence, denied any role in bus killings or desecrations and condemned them, with the Babbar Khalsa denouncing the "killing of any Hindus, robberies, or any religiously provocative acts." According to them, their targets were only either Sant Nirankaris involved in 1978, or police officers who were deemed guilty of "torturing and humiliating" Sikh youth detained during the Dharam Yudh Morcha and harassing their family members.

Jarnail Singh Bhindranwale made a speech from the Guru Nanak Niwas on October 16 condemning the massacre, but accusing Indira Gandhi of double standards for dismissing Darbara Singh's government in response, questioning why she did not do so on account of the 200 Sikhs who "achieved martyrdom" at the hands of Punjab police during Dharam Yudh Morcha during the period prior. In mid-December, he made statements to the press decrying both this and other attacks on Hindus during the preceding months, suggesting by then that these attacks were false flag operations by the government to secure Hindu votes. Shortly afterwards, responding to a dispute with Babbar Khalsa, he moved with his followers into rooms near the Akal Takht, heading off the possibility of a government raid in the midst of the increasing tensions.

Following national public outrage, the government pressured Longowal and other moderate factions of the Sikh leadership to issue a religious edict condemning violence. The extremist faction raised objections, questioning whether security forces would abide by similar principles; negotiations subsequently fell through as Longowal and the moderates succumbed to internal dissent. Judgep S. Chima cites this dereliction as evidence of the extremist faction within the Sikh leadership gaining more influence by the fall of 1983.

== See also ==
- 1987 Lalru bus massacre
- 1987 Fatehabad bus killings
- Insurgency in Punjab, India
- Khalistan Movement
- List of bus killings during Punjab insurgency

== Sources ==
- Dhillon, Gurdarshan Singh (1996). Truth about Punjab: SGPC White Paper. Amritsar, Punjab: Shiromani Gurdwara Parbandhak Committee. ISBN 978-0836456547.
