= Moga, Iran =

Moga مگا
- Village
- Location within Iran
- Coordinates: 26°04′27″N 58°54′27″E
- Country: Iran
- Province: Hormozgan
- County: Jask
- Bakhsh: Lirdaf
- Rural District: Surak

Population (2006)
  - Total: 52
- Time zone: UTC+3:30 (IRST)
  - Summer (DST): UTC+4:30 (IRDT)

Moga (Persian: مگا, also Romanized as Mogā; also known as Mogāh, Mogh Gah, Mogh Gāh, and Mogh Geh) is a village in Surak Rural District, Lirdaf District, Jask County, Hormozgan Province, Iran. At the 2006 census, its population was 52, in 11 families.
