= 1986 Hoshiarpur bus massacre =

Terrorist incident in Punjab, India

Hoshiarpur bus massacre
- Part of Insurgency in Punjab
- Khuda, Dasua Tehsil, Hoshiarpur district (India)
- Location: 31°35′N 75°59′E; Khuda, Dasua tehsil, Hoshiarpur district, Punjab, India
- Date: 30 November 1986; 39 years ago
- Target: Punjabi Hindus
- Attack type: Mass shooting
- Weapon: Assault rifles
- Deaths: 24 Hindus
- Motive: Sikh Separatism; Persecution of Hindus

The 1986 Hoshiarpur Bus Massacre was a massacre of 24 Hindu bus-passengers by Khalistani militants. The bus massacre was the worst terrorist incident in Punjab of the year 1986. It occurred on Sunday, 30 November 1986, near Khuda located in the Hoshiarpur district in the northern state of Punjab, India close to the Indo-Pak border.

According to the local police officials four Khalistani militants carrying automatic weapons (AK-47) and revolvers hijacked public bus No. PJG 7284, shouting pro-Khalistan slogans and taking it to a remote area. The terrorists then commanded all Hindu passengers to get off the bus. While the passengers were getting down, the terrorists opened fire on them killing twenty-four of them and injuring seven with gunshots. The gunmen then fled the location after the killings in motorcycles and scooters.

== Objective ==
The goal of the terrorists behind the massacre was to drive out the millions of Hindus living in the Punjab state and force the Sikhs living in the other states of India to move in. This would have enabled the Sikh separatists to claim the Punjab state as a sovereign country of Khalistan. Thousands of refugees belonging to the Hindu religion from Punjab had already moved to New Delhi to escape the communal violence.

In July same year, after a similar incident of the killing of 15 people in Muktsar in July, Hindu-Sikh riots had broken out in western part of New Delhi, where a majority of Hindu refugees from Punjab lived. Five people were killed in those Riots. The Police in New Delhi were put on increased vigilance with more patrolling to prevent a similar rioting that had happened in July.

== Reactions ==
The Prime Minister of India, Rajiv Gandhi, made a condolence statement on the Sunday night where he had expressed sympathy for the "sorrowing mothers, fathers, wives and children of the victims." He said, "I am with them in this moment of grief, and I resolve with them not to rest until we have conquered the evil designs of disruptive forces,". The attack was called a "grave provocation to secularism, love and brotherhood, the basic principles of new, resurgent India."

The Governor of Punjab, S.S. Ray, called the incident an "act of madness" and he requested both the Sikhs and the Hindus in the state to maintain peace by keeping restraint.

According to the Police director of Punjab, Julio Ribeiro, in the last 11 months, more than 400 civilians were killed with an overall figure of more than 450 killed in sectarian violence in Punjab.

== See also ==
- 1991 Punjab killings
