= 1986 Muktsar bus massacre =

Terrorist incident in Punjab, India

Muktsar bus massacre
- Part of Insurgency in Punjab
- Muktsar Bus stand (India)
- Location: 30.29°N 74.31°E; Sri Muktsar Sahib, Punjab, India
- Date: 25 July 1986; 40 years ago
- Target: Hindus
- Attack type: Mass shooting
- Weapon: Assault rifles
- Deaths: 14 Hindus and 1 Sikh

1986 Muktsar bus massacre was a massacre of 14 Hindu and one Sikh bus-passenger by Khalistani militants. It occurred on 25 July 1986, when a bus was attacked by militants in which 15 people were shot dead in Muktsar in the northern state of Punjab, India.

Los Angeles Times reported that three men had boarded an express bus going from Muktsar, located in the erstwhile Faridkot district in the western Punjab to its destination Chandigarh. After travelling for approximately 10 miles after Muktsar, at a railway crossing the bus stopped and a fourth person boarded it. The four men started waving their weapons which included pistols and Sten guns, and ordered the ladies, children and people of the Sikh religion, who were profiled by their identification symbols turbans and long beards, to get down from the bus. The four men started shooting the remaining Hindu passengers still on the bus. It was reported that the passengers who were killed were all men belonging to the Hindu religion except one man, who was a Sikh with shaved beard. The number of injured passengers was seven. One of the injured man named Surjit Singh was another Sikh in the bus with shaved beard. Surjit was shot in the head and lost his vision but survived. His wife reportedly pleaded with the terrorists to spare them since they were Jat Sikhs as well, but she was ignored.

The separation of the passengers on religious grounds and the subsequent massacre of 14 Hindus, suggested that the massacre was a part of Sikh separatist Khalistan movement's campaign designed to divide the communities of Sikh and the Hindus.

In bus attack was a major terrorist incident in Punjab during the year 1986, worst being the 1986 Hoshiarpur Bus massacre. Los Angeles Times called the massacre as "one of the worst against the Hindu community during the more than five years" since that the Sikh separatist Khalistan movement had become active in Punjab. The state of Punjab had a Sikh population of 9 million and Hindu population of 7 million.

== Objective ==
The goal of the terrorists behind the massacre was to drive out the seven million Hindus living in the state of Punjab and force the Sikhs living outside of the Punjab state to move in. This would have enabled the Sikh separatists to claim the Punjab state as a sovereign country of Khalistan.

Districts near the Indo-Pak border like Faridkot had the most intense campaign carried out by Militants to intimidate the local Hindus and had resulted in their mass exodus. Several thousand Hindu refugees from Punjab had already moved to New Delhi to escape the communal violence.

The India-Pakistan diplomatic relationship has come under strain due to the allegations from Indian diplomats about Pakistani intelligence agents supporting the Militants.

== Aftermath ==
The police in Faridkot district had placed the district on curfew. After the incident of the killing of 15 people in Muktsar in July, Hindu-Sikh riots had broken out in western part of New Delhi, where a majority of Hindu refugees from Punjab lived. Five people were killed in those Riots.

== Reactions ==
The terrorist attack was raised in the Parliament of India where it was condemned. The Punjab state government which consisted of moderate Sikhs also spoke against the incident. The five major political parties in Punjab state had called for businesses to remain closed in protest of the massacre.

The Punjab state government, convened an emergency meeting in Chandigarh and made an appeal to the citizens to "remain calm in the face of grave provocation and not to fall into the trap laid by anti-social elements wanting to throw the state into fratricidal bloodshed."

== See also ==
- 1991 Punjab killings
