= Lalru =

- Town
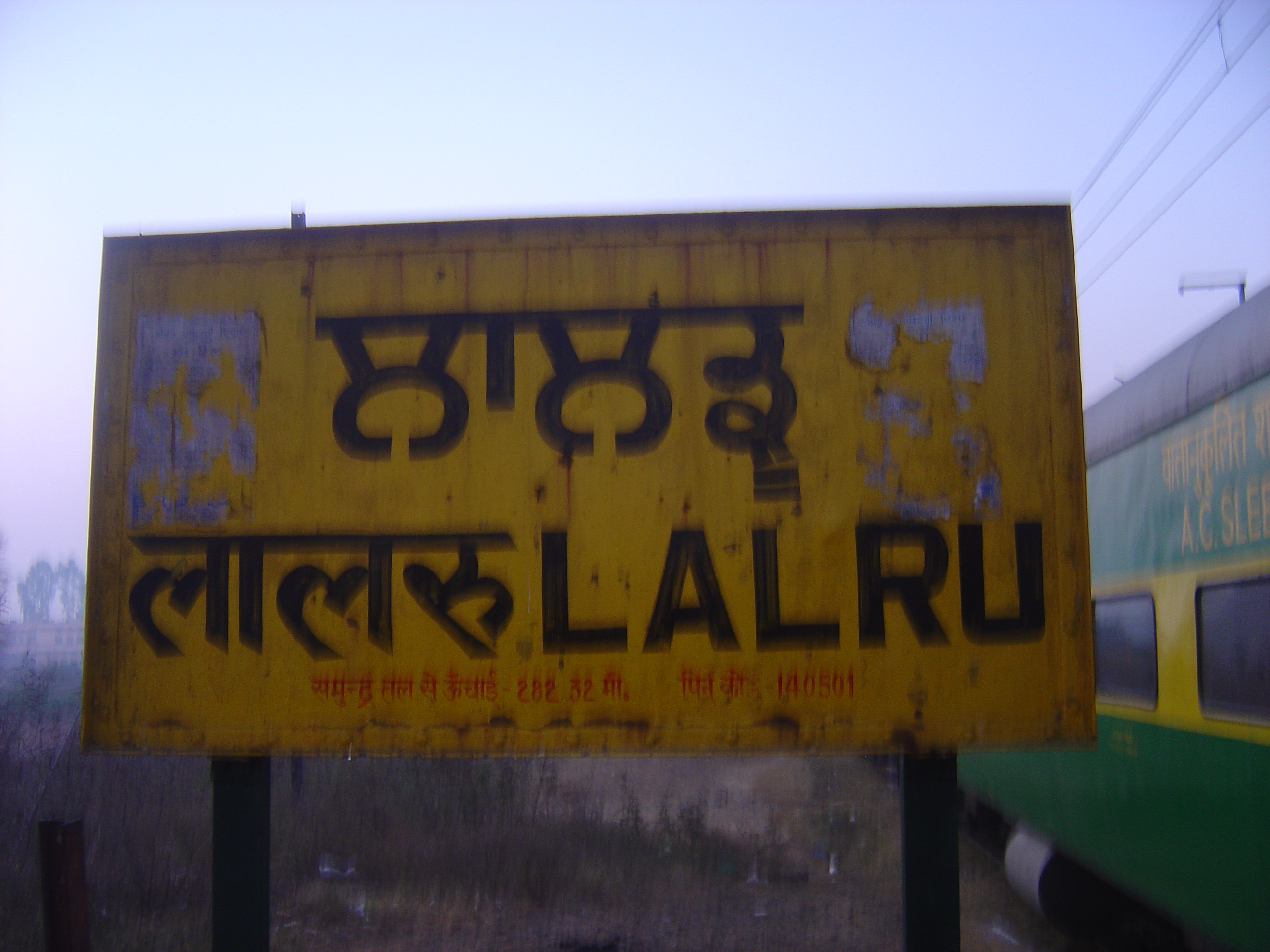

- Location in Punjab, India Lalru (India)
- Coordinates: 30°29′12″N 76°48′02″E
- Country: India
- State: Punjab
- District: S.A.S Nagar (Mohali)

Population (2011)
  - Total: 25,000

Languages
  - Official: Punjabi
  - Native: Puadhi
- Time zone: UTC+5:30 (IST)
- PIN: 140501
- Telephone code: 01762
- Vehicle registration: PB-65, PB-70
- Nearest city: AMBALA, Derabassi, Zirakpur
- Literacy: 90%
- Lok Sabha constituency: Patiala
- Vidhan Sabha constituency: Dera Bassi

Lalru is a town and a Municipal Council In Mohali District about 30 km from Chandigarh, the capital of both Haryana and Punjab, on the Chandigarh-Ambala National Highway, NH 22. Lalru is having one of the toll tax barriers on this Chandigarh - Delhi National Highway. It is part of Greater Mohali and Chandigarh Capital Region (CCR) or Chandigarh Metropolitan Region (CMR), Which is an area, which includes the union territory city of Chandigarh, and its neighboring cities of Mohali, Zirakpur, New Chandigarh (in Punjab), and Panchkula (in Haryana). Chandigarh Administration, Greater Mohali Area Development Authority (GMADA) and Haryana Urban Development Authority (HUDA) are different authorities responsible for the development of this region.

The economy of the region is interdependent as the area is continuously inhabited, though falling under different states. There is a lot of movement of people and goods daily to and from suburbs, like most of the people working in Chandigarh live in a suburb like Zirakpur. The local industry is on the outskirts like Derabassi, Lalru, and Baddi. Greater Mohali is an extension of Mohali city and includes the areas of Mundi Kharar, Lalru and Landran. This area comes under Greater Mohali Area Development Authority (GMADA).

== Lalru bus massacre ==
On 6 July 1987, 38 Hindus were killed by a pro-Khalistan Sikh militant organization, the Khalistan Commando Force, when a bus was going from Chandigarh to Rishikesh, in order to drive out the million Hindus living in the state of Punjab and forced the Sikhs living outside of the Punjab state to move in to enable the Sikh separatists to claim the Punjab state as a sovereign country of Khalistan.

== Educational institutes ==
- Pratap Academy
- Swami Parmanand Group of Colleges
- Universal Group of Institutions
- Punjab College of Engineering & Technology (PCET)
- Ram Devi Jindal Group of Professional Institutions
- Divya Shiksha Gurukul College of Education
- Attri College of Education for Girls
- Govt. ITI Lalru

== See also ==
- Lalru railway station
- 1987 Lalru bus massacre
