= Human rights abuses in Punjab, India =

Aspect of the 1984–1995 Punjab insurgency in India

From 1984 to 1995, the state of Punjab in northern India was engaged in a power struggle between the militant secessionist Khalistan movement and Indian security forces. The Indian government responded to the escalating Punjab insurgency by launching Operation Blue Star in 1984, storming the Harmandir Sahib, or Golden Temple complex in Amritsar—the center of Sikh religious and spiritual life, where some militant groups had retreated. The Operation was controversial and resulted in the deaths of hundreds of civilians, militants and soldiers. After Sikh bodyguards assassinated Prime Minister Indira Gandhi, a state wide massacre ensued.

The aftermath of these events were felt for more than a decade. According to a Human Rights Watch report, state security forces adopted "increasingly brutal methods to stem the insurgency, including arbitrary arrests, torture, prolonged detention without trial, disappearances and summary killings of civilians and suspected militants". Militant organizations responded with increased violence aimed at civilians, state security forces, and Sikh political leaders deemed to be negotiating with the government. From 1981–94, tens of thousands of youths went missing or were killed in Punjab. The worst affected districts during the militancy years were the ones bordering the international border with Pakistan, namely Gurdaspur, Amritsar, and Tarn Taran districts.

== Encounters ==
The Human Rights Watch report on Punjab concluded that security forces in Punjab "systematically violated international human rights law as well as the laws of war governing internal armed conflict." It further stated that "members of the Punjab police, the federal paramilitary troops of the Central Reserve Police Force and the Border Security Force and, to a lesser extent, the Indian Army...engaged in widespread summary executions of civilians and suspected militants"

The Human Rights Watch delegation concluded that "based on the frequency with which these killings were reported to take place and the consistency of the eyewitness testimony," such executions were not aberrations but in fact "the product of a deliberate policy known to high-ranking security personnel and members of the civil administrations in Punjab and New Delhi." Members of the delegation believed that there was "credible evidence to indicate that, in some cases, the police...actually recruited and trained extrajudicial forces to carry out many of these killings," and that further, "security legislation...increased the likelihood of such abuses by authorizing the security forces to shoot to kill and by protecting them from prosecution for human rights violations". During the counter-insurgency campaign the Indian central government gave its security forces wide leeway in their attempt to quell the insurgency, and refused to exert the control necessary to stop widespread abuse of human rights. The Asia Division of Human Rights Watch (formerly Asia Watch) sent a delegation to Punjab for two months in 1990, and during that limited time "documented 29 extrajudicial executions in which the security forces falsely claimed that the victims were killed in ‘encounters’", along with 12 disappearances and 32 cases of torture by security forces.

US state department says that over 41,000 cash bounties were paid to police in Punjab for extrajudicial killings of Sikhs between 1991 and 1993 alone and India has not allowed Amnesty International to conduct an independent human-rights investigation in Punjab since 1978.

== National Security Act and Terrorist and Disruptive Activities (Prevention) Act ==
In 1980, India’s National Security Act was passed, which allowed security officials to detain a suspect without charge or trial for one year. In 1984, the NSA was amended so that suspected militants in Punjab could be detained for up to two years. After the 1984 amendments, security officials could detain a suspect for over four months before notifying an Advisory Board of the grounds for detention, and the Board did not have to issue a judgment to the government on those grounds for five more months. Detainees were not informed of any of these decisions, and therefore had no opportunity to file a habeas corpus petition. Similarly, the Terrorist and Disruptive Activities (Prevention) Act, or TADA, criminalized any action deemed to be part of a "disruptive activity" and gave the police more time to detain suspects without transfer to judicial custody. Investigations have shown that many of those detained under such laws at various times since their enactment have been innocent of any connection with militant activity. Despite the fact that the Indian government allowed the TADA to lapse in 1995, human rights organizations have claimed that many suspects remained in custody, without charge, awaiting prosecution under TADA.

== Armed Forces Special Powers Act ==
The Armed Forces (Punjab and Chandigarh)Special Powers Act (AFSPA) was passed in 1983. It allows either the governor of a region or the Central Government to declare any part of the state a "disturbed" area, allowing security forces to kill any person carrying something deemed capable of being a weapon, and arrest any person based on a "reasonable suspicion" that they intend to commit an offense. It also empowers security forces to kill any person who is engaged in an action deemed to be a threat to public order, and instructs courts not to take cognizance of any offense committed by such security forces unless specifically instructed to do so by the Central Government.

== Militants' human rights violations ==
According to the US State Department, and the Assistant Inspector General of the Punjab Police Intelligence Division, the KCF was responsible for the 1995 assassination of Chief Minister Beant Singh. Many incidents of innocent civilians, mostly Hindus, being dragged from buses and brutally murdered also took place in Punjab. One example among many is the killing of 72 Hindus in two separate incidents near the Haryana border. KCF Terrorists also butchered 125 Hindus travelling by train near Ludhiana. Sikh Terrorists even went as far to kill whole families of Hindus from villages so as to illegally acquire their land and property. Sikh militants were also responsible for murders of many famous Punjabi Personalities including Amar Singh Chamkila, Punjabi Revolutionary Poet Avtar Singh Pash, Punjabi actor Veerendar Singh, Punjab Kesari Group founder and Ex MP Lala Jagat Narain and many more. Sikh Terrorists were involved in bombing of Air India Flight 182 killing 329 people including crew.

== See also ==
- 1984 Anti-Sikh riots
- Human rights in India
- Operation Blue Star
- Police encounter
- Punjab insurgency
- 2014 Jamalpur Encounter
- 2020–2021 Indian farmers' protest
