= 1987 Lalru bus massacre =

Massacre in Punjab, India

- Part of Insurgency in Punjab
- Location: Between Jamalpur and Hasanpur villages near Lalru, Punjab, India
- Date: 6 July 1987 (IST)
- Target: Hindu pilgrims
- Attack type: Mass Shooting
- Deaths: 38
- Injuries: 32
- Perpetrators: Sikh militants; Khalistan Commando Force (Alleged)
- Motive: Sikh separatism; Militancy in the wake of the Punjab Insurgency; Persecution of Hindus

The 1987 Lalru bus massacre was a massacre of 38 Hindu bus passengers on 6 July 1987, by the Khalistan Commando Force militants near Lalru town in Punjab, India.

== Bus hijacking and initial encounter ==
The bus involved in the attack was the Haryana Roadways bus numbered HYE 1735, traveling from Chandigarh to Rishikesh, a Hindu holy place. On the night of 6 July 1987, it carried 76 passengers (most of whom were Hindus), when five attackers started trailing it. The passengers first saw the Fiat car, in which the attackers were traveling, at a railway crossing around 20 km from Chandigarh. Around 5 km later, the car suddenly blocked the bus, and the bus driver Hari Singh (the only Sikh on the bus) thought that the car driver was drunk. Four armed men came out of the car, threatened him with a Sten gun, and hijacked the bus.

== Robbery, threats, and communal taunts ==
The hijackers told the passengers that they were only going to loot them, and started driving along the Grand Trunk Road. The Fiat car followed the bus. They drove the bus for around 8 km, while the passengers handed over their jewellery and cash. Around 21:30, just before the Lalru police station near the Punjab-Haryana border, they drove the bus off the main road onto a link road. They then started taunting the passengers, saying "Where is your Riberio now?", referring to the police officer Julio Ribeiro who led the police operations against the insurgents in Punjab. They accused the passengers of laughing at the killings of the Sikh youth, and asked them to chant the Sikh phrase Sat Naam Wahe Guru ("Truth is the name of God"). They shouted "Make sure all Hindus are dead, you will see more blood if more Sikhs are killed!", referring to the anti-insurgent operations in Punjab.

== Mass shooting and casualties ==
The hijackers stopped the bus between Jamalpur and Hasanpur villages, ordered the remaining passengers to huddle in the middle of the bus, and started shooting from both ends. The shooting lasted for about 5 minutes, and resulted in the death of 38 people, including 5 women and 4 children. Savitri Devi, a 28-year-old woman who was killed in the attack, saved her husband and their 5-month old daughter by shielding them from the bullets. A woman named Kalawati, jumped off the bus holding her three young children, and survived. 32 people were injured in the attack.

== Death of an attacker and escape ==
One of the attackers, a clean-shaven man wearing a safari suit was killed accidentally during the firing. He was later identified as Gurmit Singh alias Tony. The attackers took his body to the Fiat car, drove along the Ghaggar River, and attempted to set the car on fire with Gurmit Singh's body inside. When it began raining, they gave up their attempt to burn the car, and escaped in a truck parked nearby.

== Police response and claim of responsibility ==
The attackers had spared the Sikh driver Hari Singh, who reached the Lalru police station and informed the police about the attack. A van driver passing through the area also heard the cries of the survivors and called the Chandigarh Police. The police arrived at the site an hour after the attackers had escaped. In the bus, the police found a note from the Khalistan Commando Force, stating that "the flower of Sikh youth was being killed in Punjab", and in retaliation, a hundred Hindus would be killed for every Sikh killed. The note accused the Government of India of killing the Sikhs, and Hindus of not raising their voice against these killings.

== Possible connection ==
The Punjab Police assumed that the killers had escaped towards Chandigarh, and imposed a curfew in Mohali on its outskirts, to find them. On the next day, the Fatehabad bus killings occurred in the neighbouring Haryana. As in the Lalru killings, the attackers were five men in their early-to-mid 20s, and most of them were clean-shaven. In both incidents, the attackers used another vehicle to block and stop the bus: this tactic had not been used in the earlier similar killings in the Punjab-Haryana area. In both cases, the killers looted the passengers, and escaped in a truck. According to the police, in both the incidents, the attackers used Chinese automatic rifles. Despite these similarities, both Haryana Police and Punjab Police played down the possibility of the same gang being behind both the attacks. According to journalists Tavleen Singh and Sreekant Khandekar, the police did this because they did not want to admit their incompetence.

== Aftermath ==
After the Lalru and the Fatehabad killings, there were reports of attacks on Sikh-owned shops in Haryana, and of 12 buses being vandalized. Protest strikes affected Chandigarh, Shimla, and many other towns in Punjab, Haryana, and the neighbouring Himachal Pradesh.

== See also ==
- 1983 Dhilwan bus massacre
- 1987 Fatehabad bus killings
- List of terrorist incidents in Punjab, India
- List of bus killings during Punjab insurgency
