= 1991 Punjab killings =

Killing of passengers on two trains in Punjab

Coordinates: 30.883°N 75.85°E

- Location: Ludhiana district, Punjab, India
- Date: June–Dec 1991
- Target: Punjabi Hindus
- Attack type: Mass shooting
- Deaths: 125
- Perpetrator: Khalistan Commando Force (Alleged)
- Motive: Sikh Separatism

The 1991 Punjab killings were a series of train massacres that occurred on 15 June 1991 and 26 December 1991 in the Ludhiana district of the Indian State of Punjab. Allegedly Khalistani militants killed 125 Punjabi Hindu passengers in these incidents.

== Events ==
=== June 1991 ===
The militants stopped the two trains about a kilometre from Ludhiana station by pulling the emergency cords, triggering emergency brakes. They proceeded to open fire inside the trains at around 9:35 p.m. (IST), killing at least 80 passengers. After the attackers fled, the train moved back to Badduwal station, where the rescue team arrived with doctors. Local villagers helped the survivors with food, water, medicine, and mental support. The attacks came less than five hours after polling closed in a national election already marred by violence and interrupted by the assassination of ex-Prime Minister Rajiv Gandhi around a month prior.

=== December 1991 ===
On 26 December Thursday , four men, believed to have been Khalistani, boarded a local passenger train travelling from Ludhiana to Ferozepur at Ludhiana. They pulled the emergency cord about 7:30 in the evening near a village called Sohian. Six other armed militants climbed aboard the train at the Sohian crossing. The militants shot at passengers who appeared to be Hindu using AK-47s. All but two of the 49 victims were Hindus. After the massacre, the gunmen left the train and disappeared into the night.

== Preceding historical context ==
The idea of Khalistan, a separate Sikh homeland, developed over time due to both colonial and post-independence events. During British rule in India, the government often treated Sikhs and Hindus as separate groups. Sikhs were heavily recruited into the British army and sometimes used against Hindu-led states that resisted British control. After India became independent in 1947, problems between the central government and the Punjab region began to grow. Many Sikhs felt politically and economically overlooked, and over time, some began to support the idea of creating their own independent nation.

== See also ==
- 1987 Punjab killings
- List of Victims of Terrorism in Indian Punjab
- List of bus killings during Punjab insurgency
