= Insurgency in Punjab, India =

1984–1995 Sikh-nationalist militant uprising in India

Insurgency in Punjab
- Part of the Khalistan movement
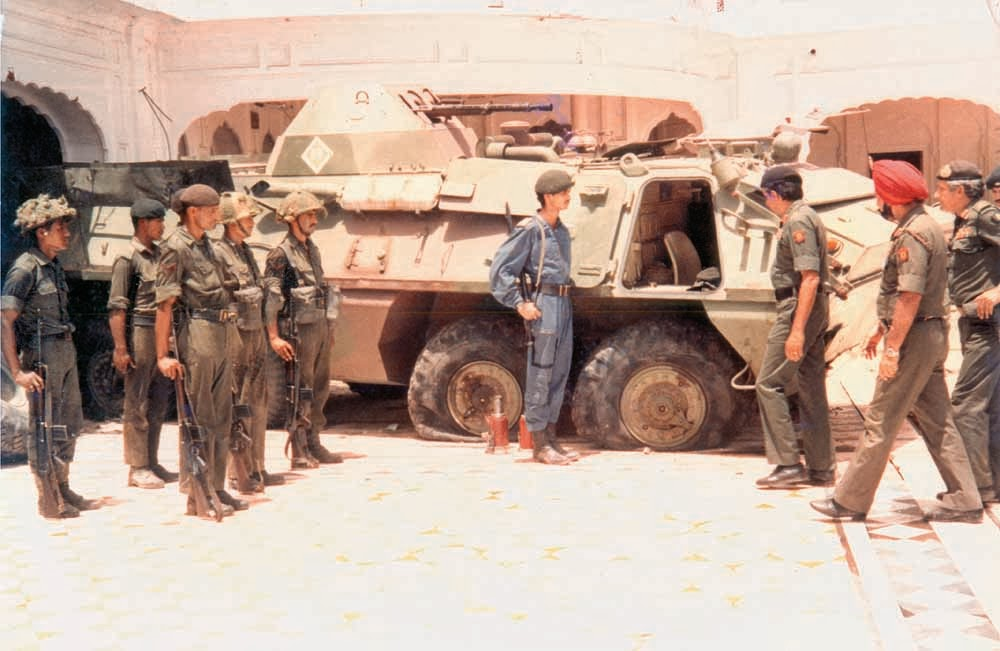
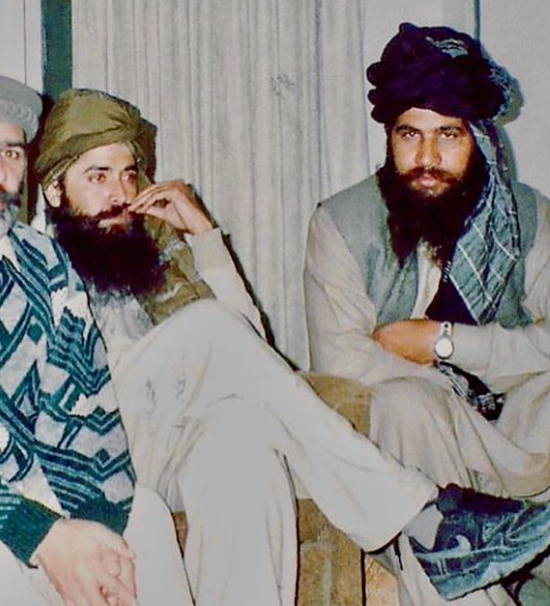
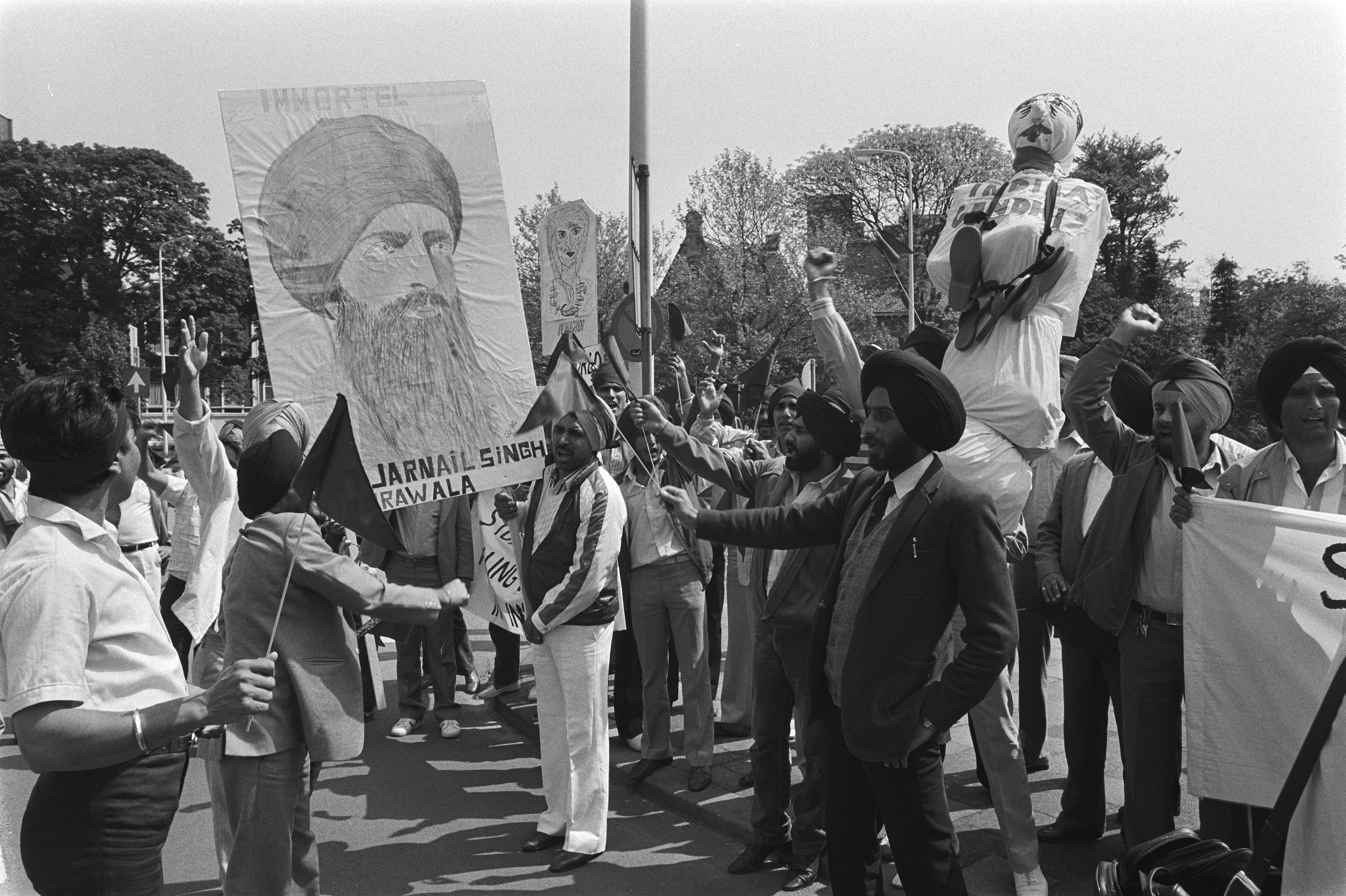
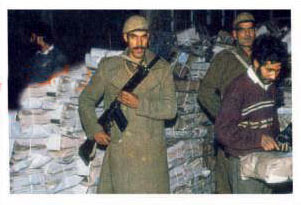
- Clockwise from top: An OT-64 SKOT disabled by militants during Operation Blue Star (1984), Chief of KCF Parmjit Singh (right) and the convenor of AISSF Daljit Singh in Lahore Fort (1991), Printing of Punjab Kesari, under strict police protection due to the continues threats and attacks on media staff (1992), Sikhs residing the Netherlands protesting against Indian government's actions (1984) and areas affected by the insurgency are shown in red colour.
| Date | 1 June 1984 – 31 August 1995 (Note: While the full-scale armed insurgency is formally dated from the military intervention in June 1984, many historians and human rights organizations trace the origins of the violence to the 1978 Sikh–Nirankari clash) (11 years, 2 months and 30 days) |
| Location | Punjab, India (Note: Other parts of India on a smaller scale) |
| Result | Indian government victory: Rajiv–Longowal Accord in 1985, partially implemented; Insurgency quelled, major violence ends after 1995; Many Pro-Khalistan separatists flee from India mainly to Canada, Australia, Pakistan and parts of Europe and America |

Belligerents
| India | Pro-Khalistan separatists Supported by: Pakistan |

Commanders and leaders
| Presidents; Zail Singh; Ramaswamy Venkataraman; Shankar Dayal Sharma; Prime Ministers; Indira Gandhi X Rajiv Gandhi; Vishwanath Pratap Singh; Chandra Shekhar; P. V. Narasimha Rao; Chief Minister of Punjab; Surjit Singh Barnala; Beant Singh X Harcharan Singh Brar; Punjab Police; DGP K.S. Dhillon; DGP Julio Riberio (WIA); DGP D.S. Mangat (WIA); DGP Kanwar Pal Singh Gill; IGP Trilok Chand Katoch X DIG Ajit Singh †; SSP Gobind Ram X SSP Prithpal Virk; SSP A.S. Brar X SSP Mohammad Izhar Alam; Indian Army; General Arun Shridhar Vaidya (Chief of Army Staff, 1983-1986) X General Krishnaswamy Sundarji (Chief of Army Staff, 1986-1988); Major General Kuldip Singh Brar; Lieutenant General Ranjit Singh Dyal; Major General B. N. Kumar X Lt. Col. Sant Singh Bhullar X CRPF; Shival Swarup; T.G.L. Iyer; S.D. Pandey; P. G. Harlankar; S. Subramanian; D.P.N. Singh; S.V.M. Tripathi | Jarnail Singh Bhindranwale †; Shabeg Singh †; Amrik Singh †; Manbir Singh Chaheru (executed); Labh Singh †; Kanwaljit Singh Sultanwind †; Paramjit Singh Panjwar; Jagjit Singh Chohan (surrendered); Ranjit Singh Neeta; Aroor Singh (executed); Avtar Singh Brahma †; Gurjant Singh †; Navroop Singh †; Navneet Singh Khadian †; Pritam Singh Sekhon †; Gurbachan Singh †; Balwinder Singh; Talwinder Singh Parmar †; Sukhdev Singh Babbar † |

Units involved
| Indian Army; Ministry of Home Affairs; National Security Guard; Intelligence Bureau; Central Reserve Police Force; Border Security Force; Railway Protection Force; Indo-Tibetan Border Police; Central Industrial Security Force; Special Frontier Force; Rashtriya Rifles; Assam Rifles; Punjab Police; Chandigarh Police; Haryana Police; Delhi Police; Uttar Pradesh Police; Jammu and Kashmir Police; Rajasthan Police; Gujarat Police; Madhya Pradesh Police; Andhra Pradesh Police; Himachal Pradesh Police; Mumbai Police | Babbar Khalsa; Bhindranwale Tiger Force of Khalistan; Khalistan Commando Force; Khalistan Liberation Force; Khalistan Zindabad Force; Others; Supported by: Inter Services Intelligence; Special Services Group |

Strength
| (India) 150,000–500,000: BSF 175,000 (158 battalions. Half patrolling against militants); Punjab Police 55,000-70,000; Police from other states sent to help 75,000; Special Police Officers 40,000; Home Guards 25,000; Police from other states sent to help 75,000; CRPF 150,000 (134 battalions); ITBP 30,000; CISF 90,000; NSG 6,500; SSG 10,000; IRF 16,500 (15 battalions); Assam Rifles 35,000 (31 battalions); Rashtriya Rifles 40,000 (36 battalions); Indian Army 70,000 | 8,000 |

Casualties and losses
| 3,468 personnel 1,768 police officers (per K.P.S Gill); 1,700 soldiers (per Inderjit Singh Jaijee citing K.P.S Gill) Beant Singh was assassinated | 7,946 insurgents |
- 11,690 non-combatants deaths (according to the government) Independent estimates vary (See End of violence section); 35,000 civilians and militants arrested/detained under TADA. (223 were convicted) 27,000 others arrested/detained.

The Insurgency in Punjab was an armed campaign by the separatists of the Khalistan movement from the mid-1980s to the mid-1990s. Economic and social pressures driven by the Green Revolution prompted calls for Sikh autonomy and separatism. This movement was initially peaceful, but foreign involvement and political pressures drove a heavy handed response from Indian authorities. The demand for a separate Sikh state gained momentum after the Indian Army's Operation Blue Star in 1984 aimed to flush out militants residing in the Golden Temple in Amritsar, a holy site for Sikhs. Terrorism, police brutality and corruption of the authorities greatly exacerbated a tense situation. By the mid-1980s, the movement had evolved into a militant secessionist crisis due to the perceived indifference of the Indian state in regards to mutual negotiations. Eventually, more effective police and military operations, combined with a policy of rapprochement by the Indian government and the election loss of separatist sympathizers in the 1992 Punjab Legislative Assembly election, largely quelled the rebellion by the mid-1990s.

The Sikh separatist leader Jagjit Singh Chohan said that during his talks with Pakistani prime minister Zulfikar Ali Bhutto affirmed his support to the Khalistan cause as revenge for Pakistan's defeat in Indo-Pakistani War of 1971. The Green Revolution brought several social and economic changes which, along with factionalism of the politics in Punjab, increased tensions between rural Sikhs with the union Government of India. In 1973, Akali Dal put forward the Anandpur Sahib Resolution to demand more autonomic powers to the state of Punjab. The union government considered the resolution a secessionist document and rejected it. Jarnail Singh Bhindranwale then joined the Akali Dal to launch the Dharam Yudh Morcha in 1982, to implement Anandpur Sahib resolution. Bhindranwale had risen to prominence in the Sikh political circle with his policy of getting the Anandpur Resolution passed, which failed. He wanted to declare a semi-autonomous, federal region of Punjab as a homeland for Sikhs.

Bhindranwale was credited by the government with launching Sikh militancy in Punjab. Under Bhindranwale, the number of people initiating into the Khalsa increased. He also increased the awareness amongst the populace about the ongoing assault on Sikh values by politicians, alleging their intentions to influence Sikhism and eradicate its individuality by conflating it with Pan-Indian Hinduism. Bhindranwale and his followers started carrying firearms at all times for self defense. In 1983, he along with his militant followers occupied and fortified Akal Takht. While critics claimed that he entered it to escape arrest in 1983, there was no arrest warrant issued in his name, and he was regularly found giving interviews to the press in and outside the Akal Takht. He made the Sikh religious building his headquarters and led a campaign for autonomy in Punjab with the strong backing of Major General Shabeg Singh. They then took refuge in the Akal Takht as the extrajudicial violence against Sikhs increased in the months before Operation Bluestar.

On 1 June 1984, Operation Blue Star was launched to remove him and the armed militants from the Golden Temple complex. On 6 June, on Guru Arjan Dev Martyrdom Day, Bhindranwale was killed by the Indian military in the operation. The operation carried out in the Gurudwara caused outrage among the Sikhs and increased the support for Khalistan Movement. Four months after the operation, on 31 October 1984, the then Prime Minister of India, Indira Gandhi was assassinated in vengeance by her two bodyguards, Satwant Singh and Beant Singh. Public outcry over Gandhi's death led to the slaughter of Sikhs in the ensuing 1984 Sikh massacre. These events played a major role in the violence by Sikh militant groups supported by Pakistan and consumed Punjab until the early 1990s when the Khalistan movement was eventually crushed in Punjab. From 1981–94, tens of thousands of youths went missing or were killed in Punjab. The worst affected districts were the ones bordering the international border with Pakistan, namely Gurdaspur, Amritsar, and Tarn Taran districts.

== Background ==
Map of Punjab

In the 1950s the Punjabi Suba movement for linguistic reorganisation of the state of Punjab and status for the Punjabi language took place, which the government finally agreed to in 1966 after protests and recommendation of the States Reorganisation commission. The state of East Punjab was later split into the states of Himachal Pradesh, the new state Haryana and current day Punjab.

The process of Sikh alienation from the national mainstream was set in motion shortly after Independence due to the communalism of national and regional parties and organization including the RSS, Jan Sangh, and the Arya Samaj, exacerbated by Congress mishandling and local politicians and factions. According to Indian general Afsir Karim, many observers believed that separatist sentiments began in 1951 when Punjabi Hindus disowned the Punjabi language under the influence of radical elements, and "doubts on the concepts of a Punjabi Suba" created mutual suspicion, bitterness, and further misunderstanding between the two communities. The 1966 reorganization left the Sikhs highly dissatisfied, with the unresolved status of Chandigarh and the distribution of river waters intensifying bitter feelings.

While the Green Revolution in Punjab had several positive impacts, the introduction of the mechanised agricultural techniques led to uneven distribution of wealth. The industrial development was not done at the same pace of agricultural development, the Indian government had been reluctant to set up heavy industries in Punjab due to its status as a high-risk border state with Pakistan. The rapid increase in the higher education opportunities without adequate rise in jobs resulted in an increase in the unemployment rate of educated youth. The resulting unemployed rural Sikh youth were drawn to the militant groups, and formed the backbone of the militancy.

After being routed in 1972 Punjab election, the Akali Dal put forward the Anandpur Sahib Resolution in 1973 to address these and other grievances, and demand more autonomy to Punjab. The resolution included both religious and political issues. It asked for recognising Sikhism as a religion and also demanded that power be generally devoluted from the Central to state governments. The Anandpur Resolution was rejected by the government as a secessionist document. Thousands of people joined the movement, feeling that it represented a real solution to demands such as a larger share of water for irrigation and the return of Chandigarh to Punjab.

The 1978 Sikh-Nirankari clashes had been within the Sikh community, but the pro-Sant Nirankari stance of some Hindus in Punjab and Delhi had led to further division, including Jan Sangh members like Harbans Lal Khanna joining the fray, who, in a protest against holy city status for Amritsar, raising inflammatory slogans like "Kachha, kara, kirpan, bhejo inko Pakistan" ("those who wear the 5 Ks (Sikhs), send them to Pakistan"), led to aggressive counter demonstrations.

== History ==
=== Dharam Yudh Morcha ===
Bhindranwale had risen to prominence in the Sikh political circle with his policy of getting the Anandpur Sahib Resolution passed. Indira Gandhi, the leader of the Akali Dal's rival Congress, considered the Anandpur Sahib Resolution as a secessionist document although it was purely humanitarian and according to earlier promises by the government but rejected. The Government was of the view that passing of the resolution would have allowed Punjab to be autonomous.

As high-handed police methods normally used on common criminals were used on protesters during the Dharam Yudh Morcha, creating state repression affecting a very large segment of Punjab's population, retaliatory violence came from a section of the Sikh population, widening the scope of the conflict by the use of violence of the state on its own people, creating fresh motives for Sikh youth to turn to insurgency. The concept of Khalistan was still vague even while the concept was fortified under the influence of former Sikh army officials alienated by government actions who now advised Bhindranwale, Major General Shabeg Singh and retired Major General and Brigadier Mohinder Singh, and at that point the concept was still not directly connected with the movement he headed. In other parts of Punjab, a "state of chaos and repressive police methods" combined to create "a mood of overwhelming anger and resentment in the Sikh masses against the authorities", making Bhindranwale even more popular, and demands of independence gain currency, even amongst moderates and Sikh intellectuals. Extrajudicial killings by the police of orthodox Sikh youth occurred in rural areas in Punjab during the summer and winter of 1982 and early 1983, provoking reprisals. Over 190 Sikhs had been killed in the first 19 months of the protest movement.

=== Operation Blue Star ===
Operation Blue Star was an Indian military operation carried out between 1 and 8 June 1984. It was ordered by Prime Minister Indira Gandhi to banish Jarnail Singh Bhindranwale and his armed followers from the buildings of the Harmandir Sahib complex in Amritsar, Punjab. In July 1983, the Sikh political party Akali Dal's President Harcharan Singh Longowal had invited Bhindranwale to take up residence in Golden Temple Complex. Bhindranwale later on made the sacred temple complex an armoury and headquarters. In the violent events leading up to the Operation Blue Star, the militants had killed 165 Nirankaris, Hindus and Nirankaris, even 39 Sikhs opposed to Bhindranwale were killed. The total number of deaths was 410 in violent incidents and riots while 1,180 people were injured.

Counterintelligence reports of the Indian agencies had reported that three prominent figures in the operation, Shabeg Singh, Balbir Singh and Amrik Singh had made at least six trips each to Pakistan between the years 1981 and 1983. The Intelligence Bureau reported that weapons training was being provided at gurdwaras in Jammu and Kashmir and Himachal Pradesh. The KGB had reportedly tipped off the Research and Analysis Wing (RAW) about the CIA and the ISI working together on a plan for Punjab, codenamed "Gibraltar". The RAW, from its interrogation of a Pakistan Army officer, received information that over a thousand trained Special Service Group commandos of the Pakistan Army had been dispatched into the Indian Punjab to assist Bhindranwale in his fight against the government. A large number of Pakistani agents also travelled through smuggling routes in Kashmir and Kutch for three days ending on 8 June. The Indian government initiated a clean-up operation throughout Punjab, codenamed Operation Woodrose.

The army had underestimated the firepower possessed by the militants. Militants had Chinese made rocket-propelled grenade launchers with armour piercing capabilities. Tanks and heavy artillery were used to attack the militants using anti-tank and machine-gun fire from the heavily fortified Akal Takht. After a 10 and half hour firefight, the army finally wrested control of the temple complex. According to the official estimate presented by the Indian government, 1592 were apprehended and there were 493 combined militant and civilian casualties.

According to figures compiled by the South Asia Terrorism Portal, over 550 civilians were killed during the fighting in and around the Golden Temple complex and within Amritsar city, many of them caught in the crossfire between security forces and armed militants.

A directory released by the radical Sikh organisation Dal Khalsa (organization) lists 229 armed Sikh militants killed during Operation Blue Star.

Former Amritsar district commissioner Ramesh Inder Singh, in his eyewitness account, wrote that 717 bodies were recovered from within the Golden Temple complex between 3 and 9 June 1984. Of these, 501 were civilians and 216 were armed militants, based on records prepared by the civil administration and police before Autopsy examinations. Singh also records that 11 additional people were killed on 1 June 1984 during clashes between the Central Reserve Police Force and armed extremists in Golden temple complex .

The Government of India’s 1984 White Paper on Operation Blue Star reported that 83 Indian Army personnel were killed and 249 were wounded during the operation. Some contemporary journalistic accounts, however, suggested higher casualties. Journalist Shekhar Gupta, who was present in Amritsar during the operation, stated that 136 army personnel were killed and around 220 injured, describing it as “the highest casualties suffered by our armed forces in a domestic operation in 24 hours.”

High civilian casualties were attributed by the state to militants using pilgrims trapped inside the temple as human shields. According to Indian army generals, it was "doubtful" that Bhindranwale had any assurance of help or promise of asylum from Pakistan, as he made no attempt to escape with any associates, in addition to traditions of martyrdom.

=== Assassination of Indira Gandhi and anti-Sikh riots ===
Operation Bluestar was criticized by many Sikhs bodies who interpreted the military action as an assault on Sikh religion. Four months after the operation, on 31 October 1984, Indira Gandhi was assassinated in vengeance by her two Sikh bodyguards, Satwant Singh and Beant Singh.

Public outcry and instigation of the public by several high-profile politicians and actors over Gandhi's death led to the killings of more than 3,000 Sikhs in the ensuing 1984 anti-Sikh riots. In the aftermath of the riots, the government reported that 20,000 had fled the Dehli; the People's Union for Civil Liberties reported "at least" 1,000 displaced persons. The most-affected regions were the Sikh neighbourhoods of Delhi. Human rights organisations and newspapers across India believed that the massacre was organised. The collusion of political officials in the violence and judicial failure to penalise the perpetrators alienated Sikhs and increased support for the Khalistan movement.

=== Militancy ===
According to the Karim, after the November 1984 anti-Sikh violence many Sikhs considered themselves a besieged community. The majority of Sikhs in Punjab would come to support the insurgents as harsh police measures, harassment of innocent Sikh families, and fake encounters from the state had progressively increased support, and provided fresh motives for angry youth to join the insurgents, who were extolled by the community as martyrs as they were killed by police. Police activity discriminatory towards Sikhs increased alienation greatly, triggering indiscriminate militant incidents. However, the insurgent groups were also highly vulnerable to infiltration by security forces, providing possible motive as to frequent assassination of those suspected of being informants.

A section of Sikhs turned to militancy in Punjab; some Sikh militant groups outside Punjab aimed to create an independent state called Khalistan through acts of violence directed at members of the Indian government, army or forces. Others demanded an autonomous state within India, based on the Anandpur Sahib Resolution. Rajiv Gandhi congratulated a "large number" of Sikhs in a speech in 1985 for condemning the actions of the militants "for the first time."

An anthropological study by Puri et al. had posited fun, excitement and expressions of masculinity, as explanations for the young men to join militants and other religious nationalist groups. Puri et al. stated that under educated and illiterate young men, and with few job prospects had joined pro-Khalistan militant groups with "fun" as one of the primary reasons, asserting that the pursuit of Khalistan was the motivation for only 5% of "militants". However, retired Indian Army general Afsir Karim had described "myths" that had become part of the conventional wisdom of the establishment, including that of "Sikhs have no cause to be dissatisfied or disgruntled" or "have no grievances", or that "terrorism and violence is the work of a handful of misguided youth and criminals and can be curbed by strong measures taken by the state law and order apparatus", stating that the terrorism was a preliminary stage of insurgency in Punjab, that it was well organized, and that the militants were highly motivated and that crime was not their motive. Army leaders during the earlier operation had noted that "it was now evident that this was no rabble army, but a determined insurgent army fired up with religious fervour." The movement would only begin to attract lumpen elements in the late 1980s, joining for the allure of money rather than the cause of a separate homeland for the Sikhs, as well as by entryists like Naxalites who "took advantage of the situation for their own ends."

According to Human Rights Watch in the early 1980s militants carried out indiscriminate bombings in crowded places, while Indian security forces killed, disappeared, and tortured thousands of innocent civilians extrajudicially during its counterinsurgency campaign. On the same day, in another location, a group of militants killed two officials during an attack on a train. Trains were attacked and people were shot after being pulled from buses.

The Congress(I)-led Central Government dismissed its own Punjab's government, declaring a state of emergency, and imposed the President's Rule in the state.

According to Kiessling, Operation Blue Star and Anti-Sikh riots across Northern India were crucial events in the evolution of the Khalistan movement. The nationalist groups grew in numbers and strength. The financial funding from the Sikh diaspora sharply increased and Sikhs in the US, UK and Canada donated thousands of dollars every week for the insurgency. Manbir Singh Chaheru the chief of the Sikh militant group Khalistan Commando Force admitted that he had received more than $60,000 from Sikh organisations operating in Canada and Britain. One of the militant stated, "All we have to do is commit a violent act and the money for our cause increased drastically." Indira Gandhi's son and political successor, Rajiv Gandhi, tried unsuccessfully to bring peace to Punjab.

The opportunity that the government had after 1984 was lost and by March 1986, the Golden Temple was back in control of Sikh institution Damdami Taksal. By 1985, the situation in Punjab had become highly volatile. In December 1986, a bus was attacked by Sikh militants in which 24 Hindus were shot dead and 7 were injured and shot near Khuda in the Hoshiarpur district of Punjab. By the beginning of 1990, the Sikh militancy had begun to kill proportionately more Sikhs than Hindus. In the period of 1981–1989, 5,521 people, including 451 police personnel had been killed by terrorists. In the period 1990–1991, 6,000 people, including 973 police officers, paramilitary, home guards and special police personnel had been murdered. Militant organizations such as Babbar Khalsa began issuing edicts in an attempt to restore ideological justification for the millitancy which had now acquired significant criminalization in its praxis. Schools were ordered to mandate religious uniforms and ban skirts for girls, other demands included the promotion of the Punjabi language, a proscription on alcohol, cigarettes, meat and certain wedding conduct. Militants set fire to various bank branches to enforce their promotion of Punjabi, journalists and newspaper delivery men were gunned down to coerce the media into portraying the militants in a more favorable light and to append honorific titles before certain militants' names.

Killings committed by militants (based on newspaper reports 89/90)
| | 1984 | 1985 | 1986 | 1987 | 1988 | 1989 | 1990 | Total | Source |
|---|---|---|---|---|---|---|---|---|---|
| Innocents killed | 339 | 55 | 478 | 815 | 1839 | 1800 | 1800 | 7126 | |
| Police or security personnel killed | 20 | 8 | 42 | 95 | 42 | 428 | 440 | 1075 | |

==== Alleged Pakistan involvement ====
According to Indian general Afsir Karim, there was "nothing to suggest that the initial break between Sikhs and the national mainstream was engineered by outside agencies." The first impetus occurred shortly after Independence in 1951 when Punjabi Hindus, under the influence of local Hindu radical groups, abandoned Punjabi to call Hindi their mother tongue in falsified censuses to prevent the formation of the Punjabi Suba, which brought out other differences between the two communities in the open. Despite this, it required an event of the magnitude of Operation Blue Star to give rise to militancy in an organized form. The pre-operation period generated enough heat to draw Pakistan interest, but it was Operation Blue Star which gave the final push to angry Sikh youth to cross the border and accept Pakistani assistance and support. Even then their anger was "not particularly against the Hindu population but against the humiliation of Blue Star compounded by the anti-Sikh riots of 1984."

In 1964, Pakistani state-owned radio station began airing separatist propaganda targeted for Sikhs in Punjab, which continued during the Indo-Pakistani War of 1965. Pakistan had been promoting the Sikh secessionist movement since the 1970s. The Pakistani prime minister Zulfikar Ali Bhutto had politically supported the idea of Khalistan wherever possible. Under Zia ul Haq, this support became even more prominent. The motive for supporting Khalistan was the revenge for India's role in splitting of Pakistan in 1971 and to discredit India's global status by splitting a Sikh state to vindicate Jinnah's Two-nation theory. Zia associated this with the Pakistani military doctrine to "Bleed India with a Thousand Cuts". Former Director General of ISI Hamid Gul had once stated that "Keeping Punjab destabilized is equivalent to the Pakistan Army having an extra division at no cost to the taxpayers."

Since the early 1980s, for the fulfillment of these motives, the spy agency Inter-Service-Intelligence (ISI) of Pakistan became involved with the Khalistan movement. ISI created a special Punjab cell in its headquarter to support the militant Sikh followers of Bhindranwale and supply them with arms and ammunitions. Militant training camps were set up in Pakistan at Lahore and Karachi to train them. ISI deployed its Field Intelligence Units (FIU) on the Indo-Pak Border. Organisations like Bhindranwale Tiger Force, the Khalistan Commando Force, the Khalistan Liberation Force and the Babbar Khalsa were provided support.

A three-phase plan was followed by the Punjab cell of ISI.

- Phase 1 had the objective to initiate alienation of the Sikh people from rest of the people in India.
- Phase 2 worked to subvert government organisation and organize mass agitations opposing the government.
- Phase 3 marked the beginning of a reign of terror in Punjab where the civilians became victims of violence by the militants and counter-violence by the government, due to which a vicious cycle of terrorism would be induced and utter chaos would ensue.

The ISI also attempted to make appeals to the five-member Panthic Committee, elected from among the religious leaders of the Panth at the Panj Takhts as the upholders of the Sikh religion, as well as the Shiromani Gurdwara Parbandhak Committee due to its substantial financial resources, and as both Sikh committees had major political influence over Punjab and New Delhi.

Sikhs in Pakistan were a small minority and the Panthic Committee in Pakistan assisted the propaganda campaign of ISI in its propaganda and psychological warfare. The Sikh community in the country and abroad were its target. Panthic Committee delivered religious speeches and revealing incidents of torture to the Sikhs. Sikhs were instigated to take up arms against the Indian Government "in the name of a hypothetical autonomous Sikh nation".

ISI used Pakistani Sikhs as partners for its operation in the Indian Punjab. The militant training program was spread over and the Sikh gurdwaras on both sides of International border were used as place for residence and armoury for storing weapons and ammunitions.

The direct impact of these activities was felt during the Operation Blue Star where the Sikh insurgents fighting against the army were found to be well trained in warfare and had enough supply of ammunitions. After the Operation Blue Star several modern weapons found inside the temple complex with the Pakistan or Chinese markings on them.

==== Training and infrastructure ====
Pakistan had been involved in training, guiding, and arming Sikh militants. Interrogation reports of Sikh militants arrested in India gave details of the training of Sikh youth in Pakistan including arms training in the use of rifles, sniper rifle, light machine gun, grenade, automatic weapons, chemical weapons, demolition of buildings and bridges, sabotage and causing explosions using gunpowder by the Pak-based Sikh militant leaders and Pakistani army officers. A dozen militant training camps had been set up in Pakistan along the International border. These camps housed 1500 to 2000 Sikh militants who were imparted guerrilla warfare training. Reports also suggested plans of ISI to cause explosions in big cities like Amritsar, Ludhiana, Chandigarh, Delhi and targeting politicians. According to KPS Gill, militants had been mainly using crude bombs but since 1990s more modern explosives supplied by Pakistan had become widespread in usage among them. The number of casualties also increased with more explosives usage by the militants.

==== Weapons ====
By providing modern sophisticated weapons to the Sikh extremists, the Pakistani ISI produced an environment which conducted guerrilla warfare.

A militant from Babbar Khalsa who had been arrested in the early 1990s had informed Indian authorities about Pakistani ISI plans to use aeroplanes for Kamikaze attacks on Indian installations. The Sikhs however refused to participate in such operations on religious grounds as Sikhism prohibits suicide assassinations. In a hijacking in 1984 a German manufactured pistol was used and during the investigations, Germany's Federal Intelligence Service then confirmed that the weapon was part of a weapon consignment for the Pakistani government. The American government had then issued warnings over the incident after which the series of hijackings of Indian aeroplanes had stopped.

=== End of violence ===
Between 1987 and 1991, Punjab was placed under an ineffective President's rule and was governed from Delhi. Elections were eventually held in 1992 but the voter turnout was poor. A new Congress(I) government was formed and it gave the Chief of the Punjab Police (India) K.P.S. Gill a free hand.

Under his command, police had launched multiple intelligence-based operations like Operation Black Thunder to neutralise Sikh militants. Police were also successful in killing multiple high-value militants thus suppressing the violence and putting an end to mass killings.

By 1993, the Punjab insurgency had petered out, with the last major incident being the assassination of Chief Minister Beant Singh occurring in 1995.

1,714 security personnel, 1,700 soldiers, 7,946 militants, and 11,690 non-combatants were killed throughout the conflict. Some sources have stated higher figures for non-combatant deaths.

According to data published on the South Asia Terrorism Portal (SATP), 11,694 civilians were killed by Sikh militant groups during the Punjab insurgency, of whom 7,139 were Sikhs. Kanwar Pal Singh Gill, writing on SATP, stated that approximately 61 percent of the victims of terrorist violence during the insurgency were Sikhs, while around 4,500 Hindu civilians were killed during the period within Punjab, India.

== Timeline ==
Punjab Insurgancy Chronology Outline
| Date | Event | Source |
|---|---|---|
| March 1967 | Akali Dal heavily defeats INC Indian Congress Party in successive elections after 1967 Punjab Legislative Assembly election. | |
| March 1972 | Akali Dal loses in Punjab elections, Congress wins. | |
| 17 October 1973 | Akalis ask for their rights through Anandpur Sahib Resolution | |
| 25 April 1980 | Gurbachan Singh of Sant Nirankari sect shot dead. | |
| 2 June 1980 | Akalis lose suspect election in Punjab | |
| 16 Aug 1981 | Sikhs in Golden Temple meet foreign correspondent about their views on Khalistan | |
| 9 Sep 1981 | Jagat Narain, Editor, Hind Samachar group murdered. | |
| 29 Sep 1981 | Sikh Separatists hijack aircraft to Pakistan. | |
| 11 Feb 1982 | US gives Visa to Jagjit Singh Chauhan. | |
| 11 Apr 1982 | US Khalistani G.S. Dhillon Barred From India | |
| July 1982 | Sikh militants storm the parliament in a protest related to the deaths of 34 Sikhs who were tortured in police custody. | |
| 4 Aug 1982 | Akalis demand autonomy and civil rights for Punjab | |
| 11 Oct 1982 | Sikh stage protests at the Indian Parliament which is violently broken up | |
| Nov 1982 | Longowal threatens to disrupt Asian Games but Sikhs are mass arrested and abducted before reaching the games, protests disrupted | |
| 27 Feb 1983 | Sikhs permitted to carry daggers in domestic flights | |
| 23 April 1983 | Punjab Police Deputy Inspector General A. S. Atwal was shot dead as he left the Harmandir Sahib compound by an unknown gunman, widely believed to be anti-Damdami Taksal and anti-brindranwale Sikh group AKJ, who had also occupied the Darbar Sahib Complex with firearms | |
| 3 May 1983 | Jarnail Singh Bhindranwale, talks of violence being perpetuated against Sikhs without being reported since 1977 in Haryana, Rajasthan and some villages of South Punjab and for India to act | |
| 18 June 1983 | A detective inspector from Punjab police killed by Sikh militants. | |
| 14 July 1983 | Four policemen killed by Sikh militants. | |
| 21 September 1983 | Senior superintendent of Punjab Police wounded and his guard killed by Sikh militants. | |
| 29 September 1983 | 5 Punjab Police constables killed by Sikh militants in a week. | |
| 14 Oct 1983 | 3 people killed at a Hindu festival in Chandigarh | |
| 5 Oct 1983 | 6 Hindu passengers dragged off bus and shot dead in 1983 Dhilwan bus massacre. | |
| 6 Oct 1983 | President's rule imposed in Punjab | |
| Oct 1983 | 3 Hindus pulled off a train and killed. | |
| 21 Oct 1983 | A passenger train was derailed and 19 agricultural labourers from Bihar were killed by Sikh militants along with 2 other passengers. | |
| 18 Nov 1983 | A bus was hijacked and 4 Hindu passengers were killed by Sikh militants. | |
| 9 Feb 1984 | A Hindu wedding procession in Hambran of Ludhiana district bombed by Sikh militants. 14 reported dead. | |
| 14 Feb 1984 | Six policemen abducted from a post in Amritsar and one of them killed in captivity. | |
| 14 Feb 1984 | More than 12 people killed in Sikh-Hindu riots in Punjab and Haryana. | |
| 19 Feb 1984 | Sikh-Hindu clashes spread in North India. | |
| 23 Feb 1984 | 11 Hindus killed and 24 injured by Sikh militants. | |
| 25 Feb 1984 | 6 Hindus killed in a bus by Sikh militants, total 68 people killed over last 11 days. | |
| 29 Feb 1984 | Bhindranwale still openely speaks of first seeking civil rights for Sikhs and Punjab before seeking Khalistan, as opposed to the AKJ group. | |
| 28 March 1984 | Harbans Singh Manchanda, the Delhi Sikh Gurudwara Management Committee (DSGMC) president murdered. | |
| 3 April 1984 | Militants popularity grows and so does instability in Punjab. | |
| 8 April 1984 | Longowal writes – he cannot control Bhindranwale anymore | |
| 14 April 1984 | Surinder Singh Sodhi, a follower of Bhindranwale, shot dead at a temple by a man and a woman. | |
| 17 April 1984 | Deaths of 3 Sikh Activists in factional fighting. | |
| 27 May 1984 | Ferozepur politician killed by Sikh militants after confessing to fake police encounters with "terrorist" killings. | |
| 1 June 1984 | Total media and the press black out in Punjab, the rail, road and air services in Punjab suspended. Foreigners' and NRIs' entry was also banned and water and electricity supply cut off. | |
| 1 June 1984 | Operation Blue Star to remove militants from Harmandir Sahib commences, Punjab shut-down from outside world. | |
| 3 June 1984 | Army takes control of Punjab's security. | |
| 6 June 1984 | 5 day-long battle over control of the Golden Temple concludes. | |
| 6 June 1984 | Jarnail Singh Bhindranwale shot dead by military. | |
| 7 June 1984 | Indian military finally take full control of Harmandir Sahib after 8 days. Operation Bluestar concludes. | |
| 8 June 1984 | 27 Sikhs killed in protests in Srinagar, Ludhiana, Amritsar after Government forces indiscriminately fired on protesters. | |
| 9 June 1984 | Weapons and Ammunition of Sikh militants inside the Golden Temple seized by Indian troops. 2 Indian troops and 4 militants killed in shootout on the outskirts of Amritsar. | |
| 10 June 1984 | Reports of Anti-Sikh riots and killings in Delhi. | |
| 11 June 1984 | Negotiators close to a settlement on waters. | |
| 24 August 1984 | 7 Sikh militants abduct 100 passengers in 1984 Indian Airlines Airbus A300 hijacking. | |
| 31 October 1984 | Indira Gandhi assassinated by her 2 Sikh bodyguards, Satwant Singh and Beant Singh in retaliation for Operation Bluestar. | |
| 1 November 1984 | In the retaliation of Indira Gandhi's assassination, 1984 anti-Sikh riots begin in Delhi. | |
| 3 November 1984 | Anti-Sikh violence concludes. A total of 2,733 Sikhs were killed in the violence. | |
| 23 June 1985 | Air India Flight 182 was bombed by Sikh terrorists killing 329 passengers (including 22 crew members); almost all of them Hindus | |
| 20 August 1985 | Harcharan Singh Longowal assassinated by Sikh militants. | |
| 29 September 1985 | 60% vote, Akali Dal won 73 of 115 seats, Barnala CM | |
| 26 January 1986 | Sikhs have a global meeting and the rebuilding of Akal Takht declared as well as the five member Panthic Committee selected and have draft of the Constitution of Khalistan written. | |
| 29 April 1986 | Resolution of Khalistan passed by Sarbat Khalsa and Khalistan Commando Force also formed at Akal Takht with more than 80,000 Sikhs present. | |
| 25 July 1986 | 14 Hindus and one Sikh passenger killed in the 1986 Muktsar Bus massacre by Sikh militants. | |
| 30 November 1986 | 24 Hindu passengers killed in the 1986 Hoshiarpur Bus massacre by Sikh militants. | |
| 19 May 1987 | State Committee Member CPI(M) Comrade Deepak Dhawan was murdered at Village Sangha, Tarn Taran. | |
| 7 July 1987 | Sikh militants from Khalistan Commando Force attacked two buses. They singled out and killed 34 Hindu bus passengers in the 1987 Lalru Bus massacre. | |
| 12 May 1988 | Operation Black Thunder II initiated to remove militants from Harmandir Sahib. | |
| 10 January 1990 | Senior Superintendent of Batala Police, Gobind Ram, killed in bomb blast in retaliation for him and his Hindu police officers along with the BSF gang-raping Sikh women during a search on Gora Choor village. | |
| 15 June 1991 | 80 people killed on two trains by Sikh militants in 1991 Punjab killings. | |
| 17 October 1991 | 40 people killed and 197 injured in 1991 Rudrapur bombings by Sikh militants in Uttarakhand. All of the victims were Hindu civilians. | |
| 25 February 1992 | Congress achieves a major victory in Punjab Assembly elections. | |
| 7 January 1993 | Punjab's biggest police encounter done in village of Chhichhrewal Tehsil Batala; 11 Pro-Khalistan militants were successfully eliminated. | |
| 31 August 1995 | CM of Punjab Beant Singh killed in bomb blast by Sikh militants. | |

== See also ==
- Terrorism in India
- List of terrorist incidents in Punjab, India
- List of designated terrorist groups
- List of organisations banned by the Government of India
- List of terrorist incidents in India
- 1984 Anti-Sikh riots
- 1987 Punjab killings
