= Operation Black Thunder =

Military operation in India in the 1980s

Operation Black Thunder is the name given to two operations that took place in India in the late 1980s to remove Sikh militants from the Golden Temple using National Security Guard commandos and Border Security Force personnel.

Like Operation Blue Star, the operation was to neutralize the Sikh militants based in the Golden Temple in Amritsar, Punjab.

== Operation Black Thunder I ==
The first Operation Black Thunder took place on 30 April 1986. About 200 radical Sikh militants had been occupying the temple premises for the last 3 months. The operation was commanded by Kanwar Pal Singh Gill, who was the DGP of Punjab. About 300 National Security Guards commandos stormed the Golden Temple, the holiest shrine of the Sikhs, along with 700 Border Security Force troops and captured about 200 Sikh militants. One person was killed and two were injured. All of those who were arrested were released a few months after the Operation on account of a lack of evidence.The operation, which lasted eight hours, was approved by then Chief minister of Punjab Surjit Singh Barnala of Shiromani Akali Dal.

There were heavy negative reactions to the Operation. Parkash Singh Badal and Amrinder Singh along with 27 Akali MLAs broke from Barnala's party and formed their own party. Soon after SGPC president Gurcharan Singh Tohra joined them. Barnala was later ostracised by the Sikhs for his role in the operation. Years later he submitted to the Akal Takht Jathedar who made Barnala serve devotees in the Golden temple and other historic gurdwaras to atone for his mistakes.

== Operation Black Thunder II ==
Arms recovered from surrendered militants

Operation Black Thunder II (sometimes referred to as Operation Black Thunder) began on 9 May 1988 in Amritsar and ended with the surrender of the militants on 18 May. The operation was under control of the Union Home Ministry and had been planned since early 1988. In early 1988 the government created a model of the Golden Temple in the Aravalli Hills where National Security Guards practiced the operation. They later practiced the Operation in a high school and college in Harayana. The Special Action Group commandos had already started to grow their hair so they could blend in as Sikhs during the operation.

By mid February the date of the Operation was set and leave of the Special Action Group commandos had been cancelled. In the lead up to the operation Jarnail Singh Bhindranwale's nephew Jasbir Singh Rode was released and president rule was declared in Punjab. Punjab was further to be declared a state of emergency. State sponsored militants used Soviet made RPG-7's at a Vishwakarma Temple near Phagwara where there were 70 CRPFstationed.

On May 8 DIG (Deputy Inspector General of Police) of CRPF Sarabdeep Singh Virk went to a building near the Golden Temple and convinced a militant, Santhok Singh Kala, to join security forces and to carry out terrorist operations for them. Kala taunted other militants which led to them firing and Virk being injured. Hearing about the shooting the Jathedar, Jasbir Singh Rode, hurried to Amritsar.

On May 11 and 12, around 1,000 commandos from the Special Action Group were airlifted to Amritsar under the command of Brigadier Sushil Nanda. Nanda had a hotline to New Delhi with the National Security Guard control room. On May 11 Rode was able to get a ceasefire that lasted two hours. Rode met with Gurdev Singh Kaunke, journalists, and other associates. He talked to other militants. During this time commandos took their positions replacing the CRPF which had been previously stationed.

The ground level was commanded by Kanwar Pal Singh Gill who was the DGP of Punjab Police. Snipers were used in this operation. Soon civilians and militants surrendered. Compared to Operation Blue Star, little damage was inflicted on the Golden Temple. In what was reported as a successful operation, around 200 militants surrendered, 41 were killed. This operation was described as a severe setback to the Anandpur Resolution implementation movement. In contrast to prior operations, minimum force was used under full public scrutiny.

Security forces surrounded the Golden temple complex, Gill ordered its water and electricity supply cut off. The Christian Science Monitor reported that the May 1988 surrender would probably be seen as a victory for Rajiv Gandhi's anti-terrorism tactics, but headlined that there was "no end in sight to Sikh unrest". Gill stated that he did not want to repeat the mistakes made by the Indian army during Operation Blue Star. It is remembered for the free access the news media was provided unlike during Operation Blue Star. The day after the militants surrendered, nine reporters were allowed into the Temple complex. Gill's obituarists later praised the operation for causing little damage to the temple and for allowing press access. Kirtan was resumed at the Golden Temple on 23 May 1988 after a two-week break during this operation. Soon after the operation, the government banned the use of religious shrines for political and military purposes and increased penalties for possessing and using of illegal weapons.

In 2002, Sarabjit Singh, then Deputy Commissioner of Amritsar at the time published a book "Operation Black Thunder: An Eyewitness Account of Terrorism in Punjab". The account was criticised by Kanwar Pal Singh Gill who claimed that the operation was initially called "Operation Gill" before being renamed "Operation Black Thunder".

== See also ==
- Khalistan
- Kharku
- Operation Blue Star
- Operation Woodrose
