= Durgiana Temple =

Hindu temple in Amritsar, Punjab, India

- Durgiana Mandir
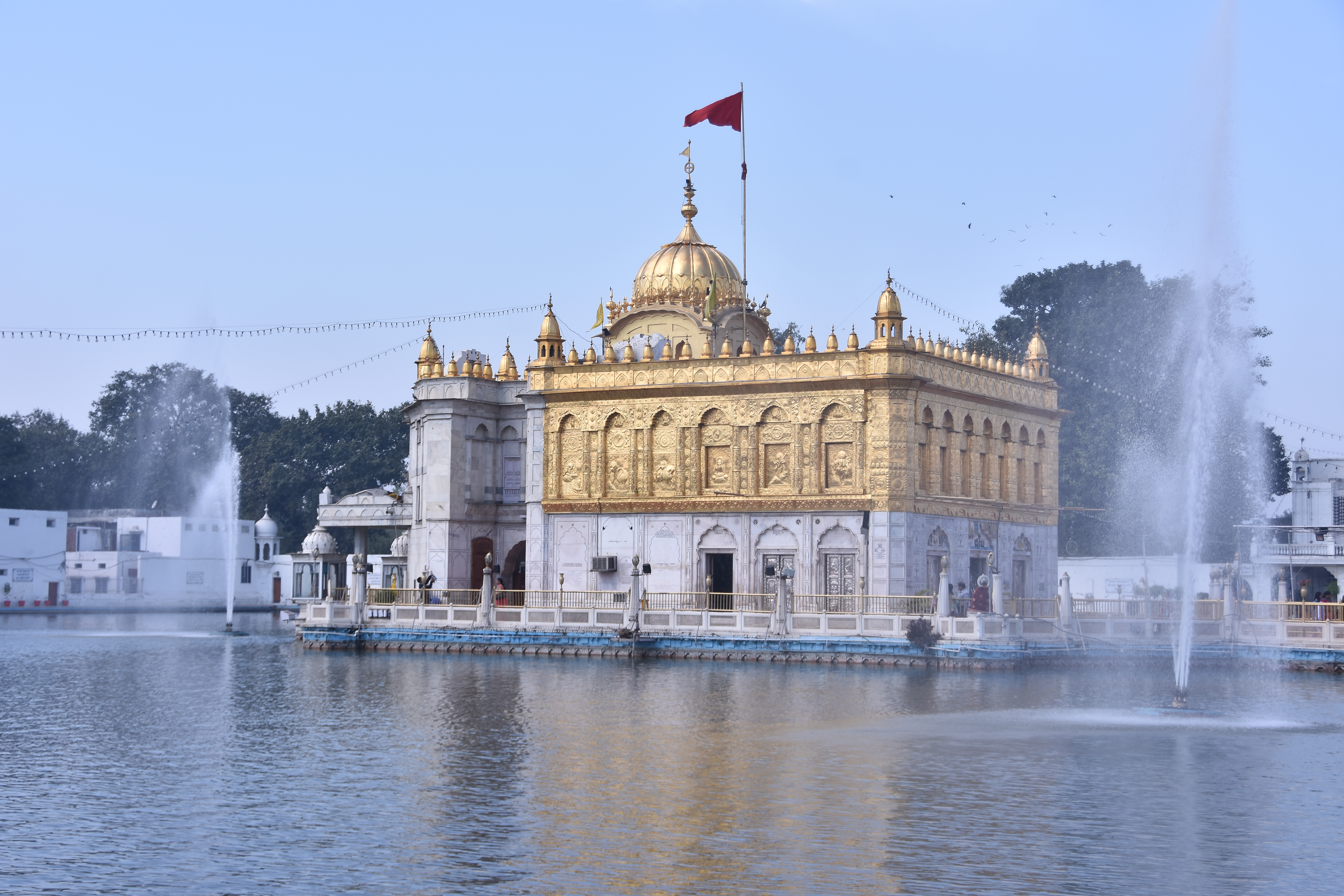
- Durgiana Temple, Amritsar, India

- Location in Amritsar, Punjab, India Durgiana Temple (India)

Religion
- Affiliation: Hinduism
- District: Amritsar
- Deity: Durga
- Festival: Navaratri

Location
- Location: Amritsar
- State: Punjab
- Country: India
- Coordinates: 31.64°N 74.86°E

Architecture
- Completed: 16th Century; Rebuilt in 1921
- Temple: 1

Website
- www.durgianamandir.in

Durgiana Temple or Shri Durgiana Mandir is a Hindu temple situated in the city of Amritsar in Punjab, India. Though a Hindu temple, its architecture is similar to the Sikh Harmandir Sahib (Golden Temple). The temple derives its name from the Goddess Durga, the chief Goddess who is worshipped here. Murtis of Lakshmi and Vishnu are also located and worshipped in the temple.

Although it is believed that Durgiana Mandir was built in 1921, the temple existed before it was rebuilt in 1921. It is confirmed by record in Amritsar District Gazetteer of 1893, which spoke about the Durgiana Sarovar and "Devi dwara" surrounding it which was visited by Hindu pilgrims.

== History ==
The original temple was built in 16th century. In a British report from 1880, the temple is mentioned as having been constructed in the mid-18th century, being described as a brick structure with colour decorations. It was rebuilt in 1921 by Guru Harsai Mal Kapoor in the architectural style of the Sikh Shri Harmandir Sahib (Golden Temple). Harsai Mal was a descendant of Prithi Chand and hence Guru Ram Das. The grandchildren of Harsai Mal Kapoor is currently living in amritsar and one of caretakers of the idol of Harsai mal Kapoor.

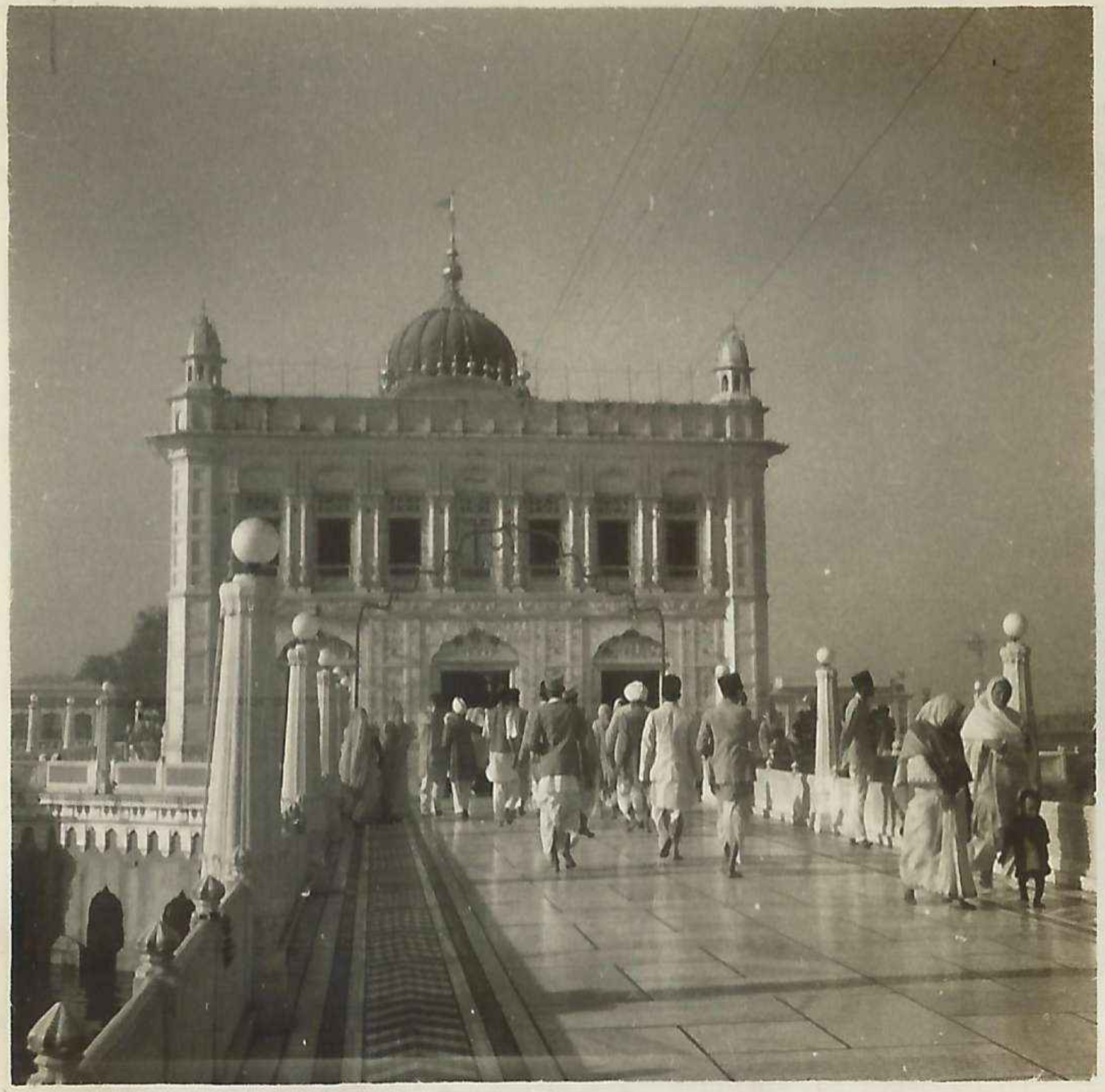
Photograph of the Durgiana Mandir in Amritsar, Punjab, circa 20th century

Existence of the Talab is also mentioned in 1868 Municipal committee, Amritsar documents. John Campbell Oman who was Professor of natural science in The Government College, Lahore mentioned about durgiana in his book where he found some mystics practising yoga. Durgiana Mandir is recorded in Amritsar District Gazetteer of 1893 which talks about Durgiana Sarovar and "Devi dwara" surrounding it which was thronged by Hindu pilgrims.

Even though Amritsar was not declared a holy city, restrictions are in force prohibiting sale of tobacco, liquor and meat within a radius of 200 metres (660 ft) around this temple and the Shri Harmandir Sahib (Sikh Golden Temple). In January 2024, Sikhs for Justice figure Gurpatwant Singh Pannun threatened the temple's management over the historicity of the site.

== Location ==
The temple is situated near the Hathi gate in Amritsar. It is very close to the Amritsar railway station, and is about 1.5 kilometres (0.93 mi) from the bus station.

== Features and designs ==
The temple is built in the middle of a sacred lake, which measures 160 metres (520 ft) × 130 metres (430 ft). Its dome and canopies are similar to that of the Golden temple of Sikh religion, also located in Amritsar. A bridge provides the approach to the temple. The dome of the temple is gilded. Marble is used extensively in the temple's features. The dome is illuminated with colourful lights. The temple is sometimes called Silver temple because of its large exquisitely designed silver doors. It has a rich collection of Hindu scriptures. The temple complex also has some historic subsidiary temples such as Seetla Mata and Bara Hanuman.

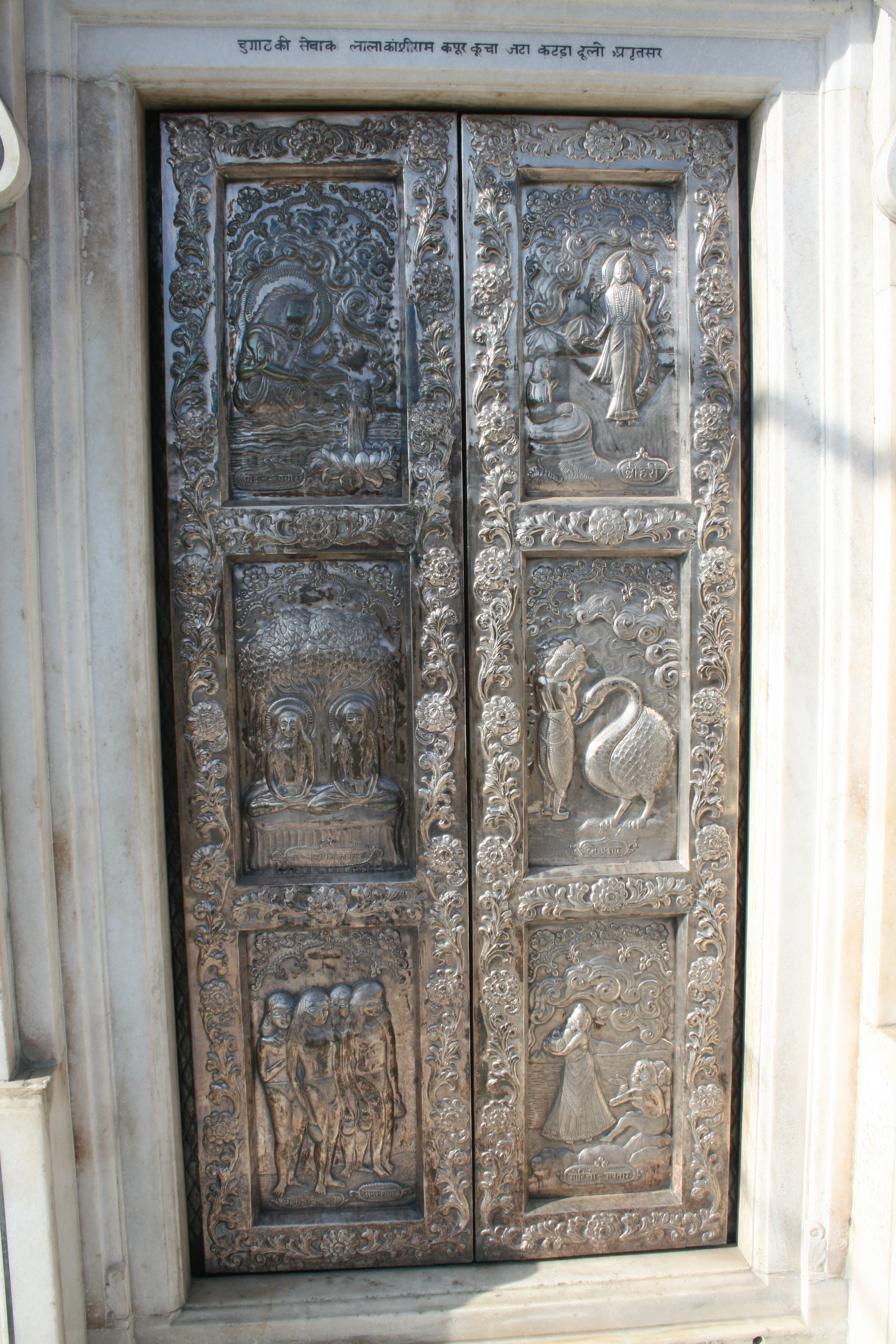
Silver Doors of the Durgiana Temple.

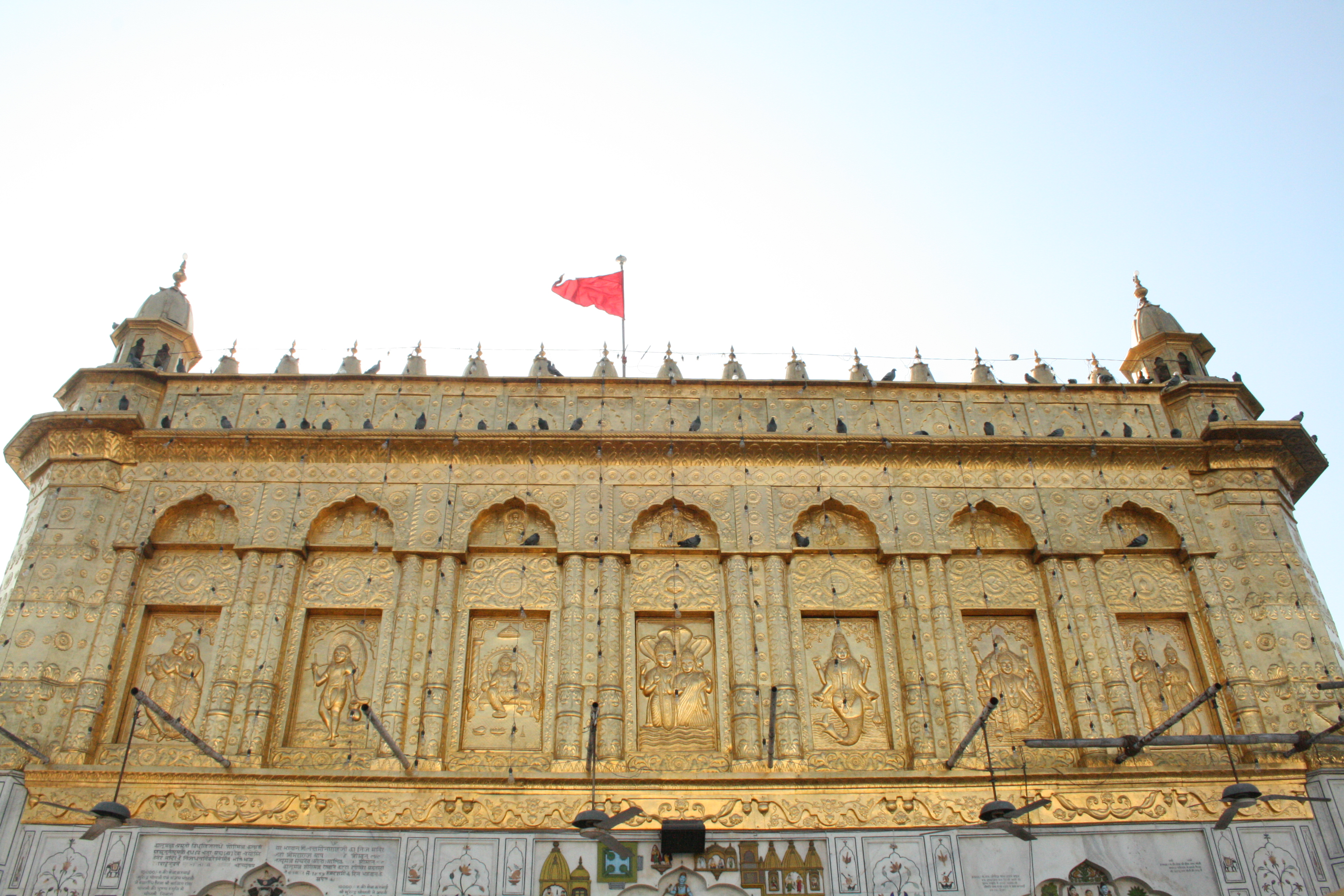
Close-up view of Durgiana Temple.

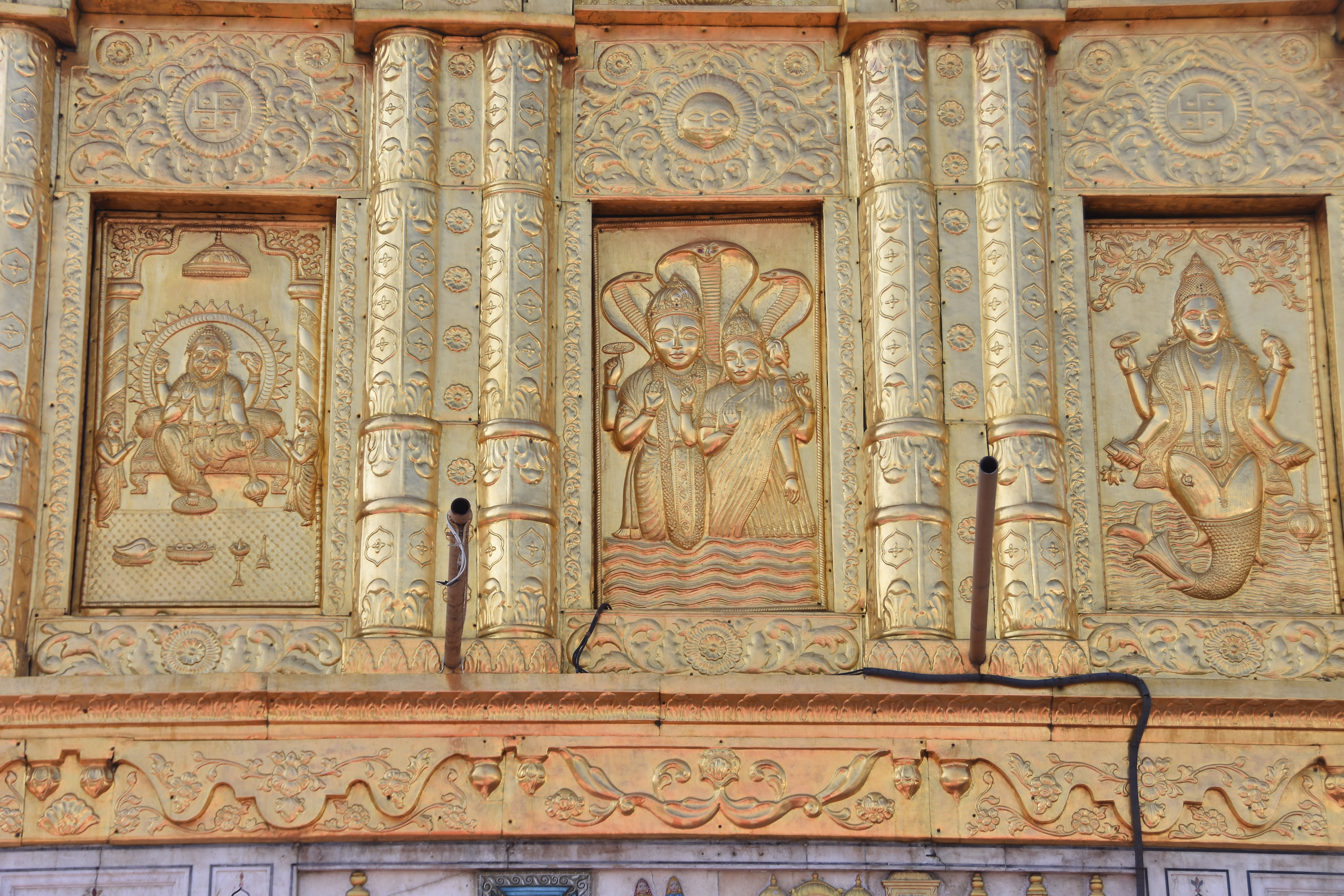
The gold plated embossed sculptures

== Festivals and Cultural events ==
Major Hindu festivals celebrated in the temple are Dussehra, Janmashtami, Rama Navami, and Diwali. A Sāwan festival is also celebrated in Durgiana Mandir in the Holy Shravan month of Hindu Calendar where newlywed couples gather at temple to worship Radha Krishna. Women adorn themselves with flower jewellery and worship at temple along with their husbands. Another festival celebrated in Durgiana temple complex is the famous 'Langur Mela' during 10 days of Navratri and Dussehra. Pilgrims in large numbers throng to the Bada Hanuman temple, with their children dressed as Langur to offer prayers in this temple, situated in the Durgiana temple complex.

== Renovation ==
The temple and its precincts were under a beautification programme since 2013, and was completed in 2015. This will provide more space for worship both inside and outside the temple premises. As per the Master Plan prepared for reshaping the environment around the temple, 55 properties had been acquired with adequate compensation package and demolished for the purpose of development works. Under this plan, a multi-storied parking complex, an open-air theatre, a shopping complex and other facilities were under construction.

== Gallery ==
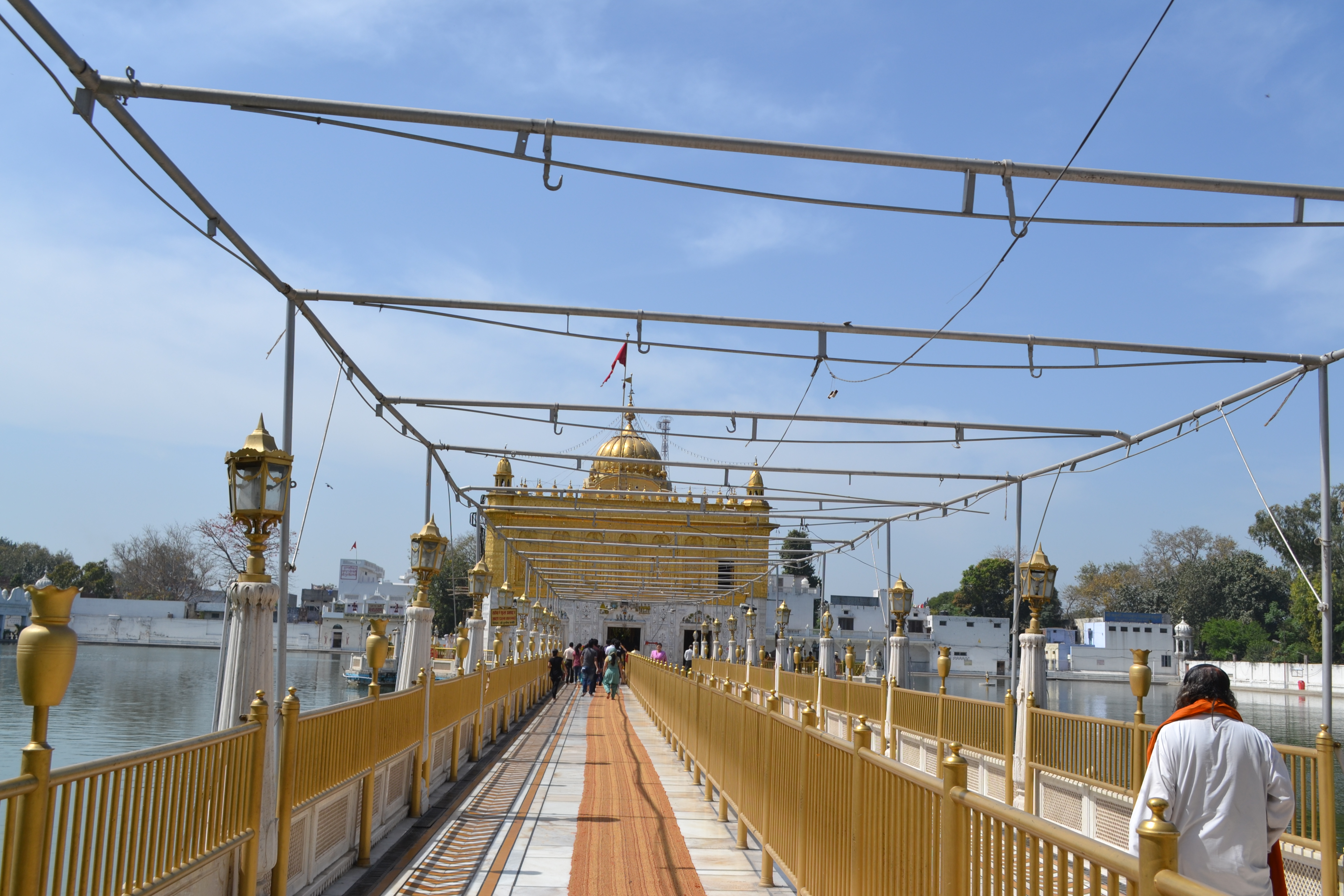
A bridge linking the temple

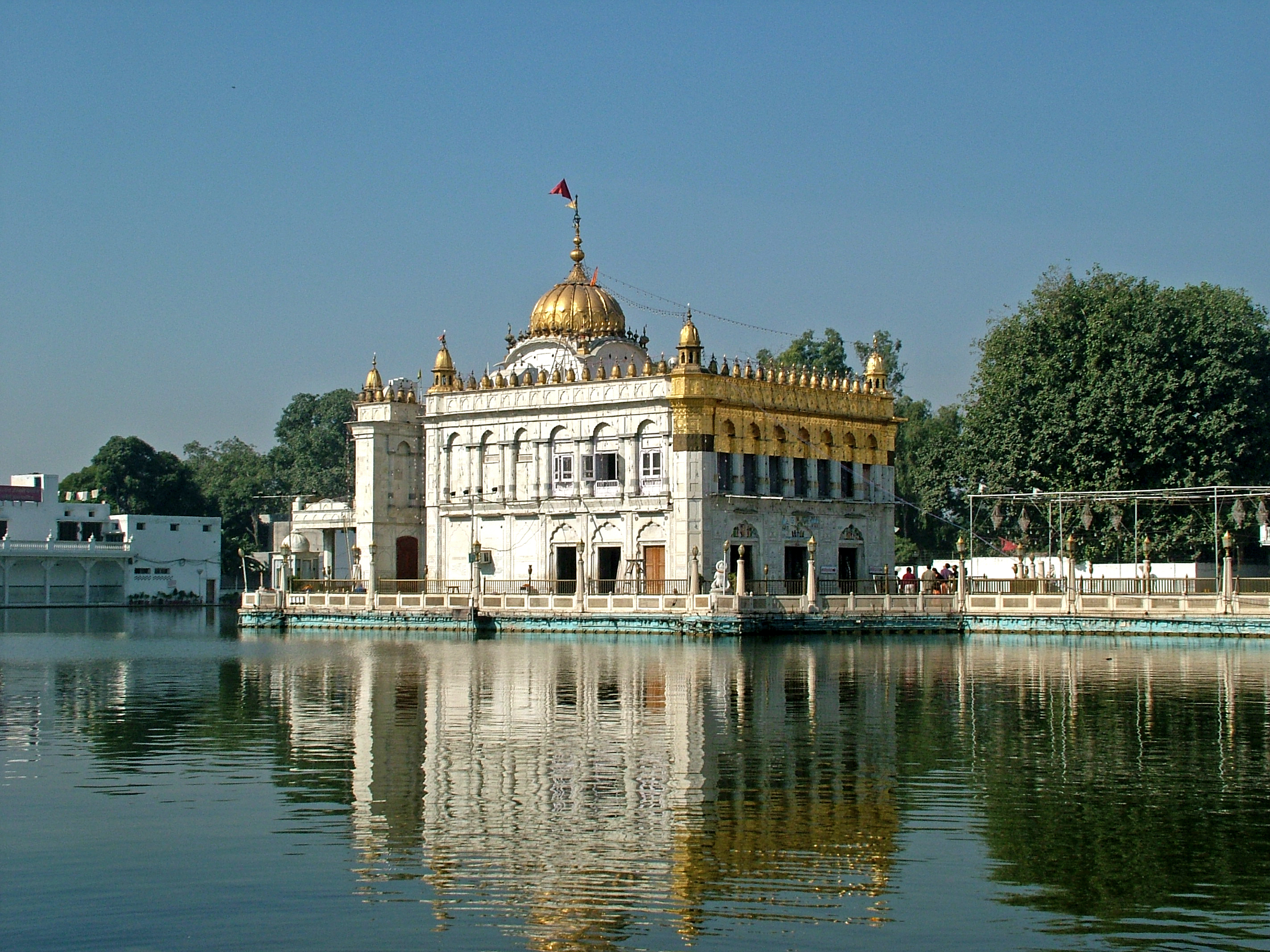
Durgiana Temple

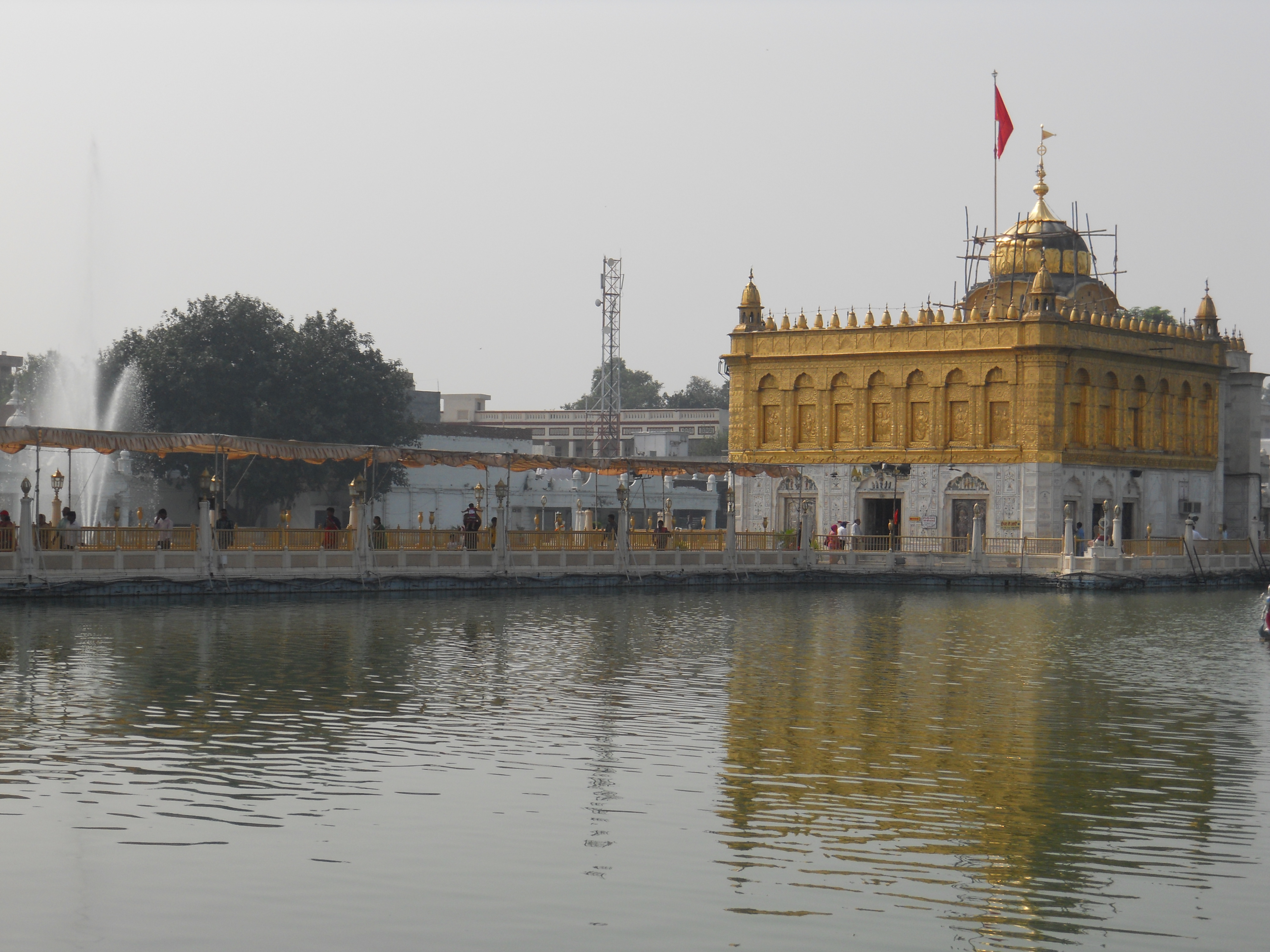
Durgiana Temple view

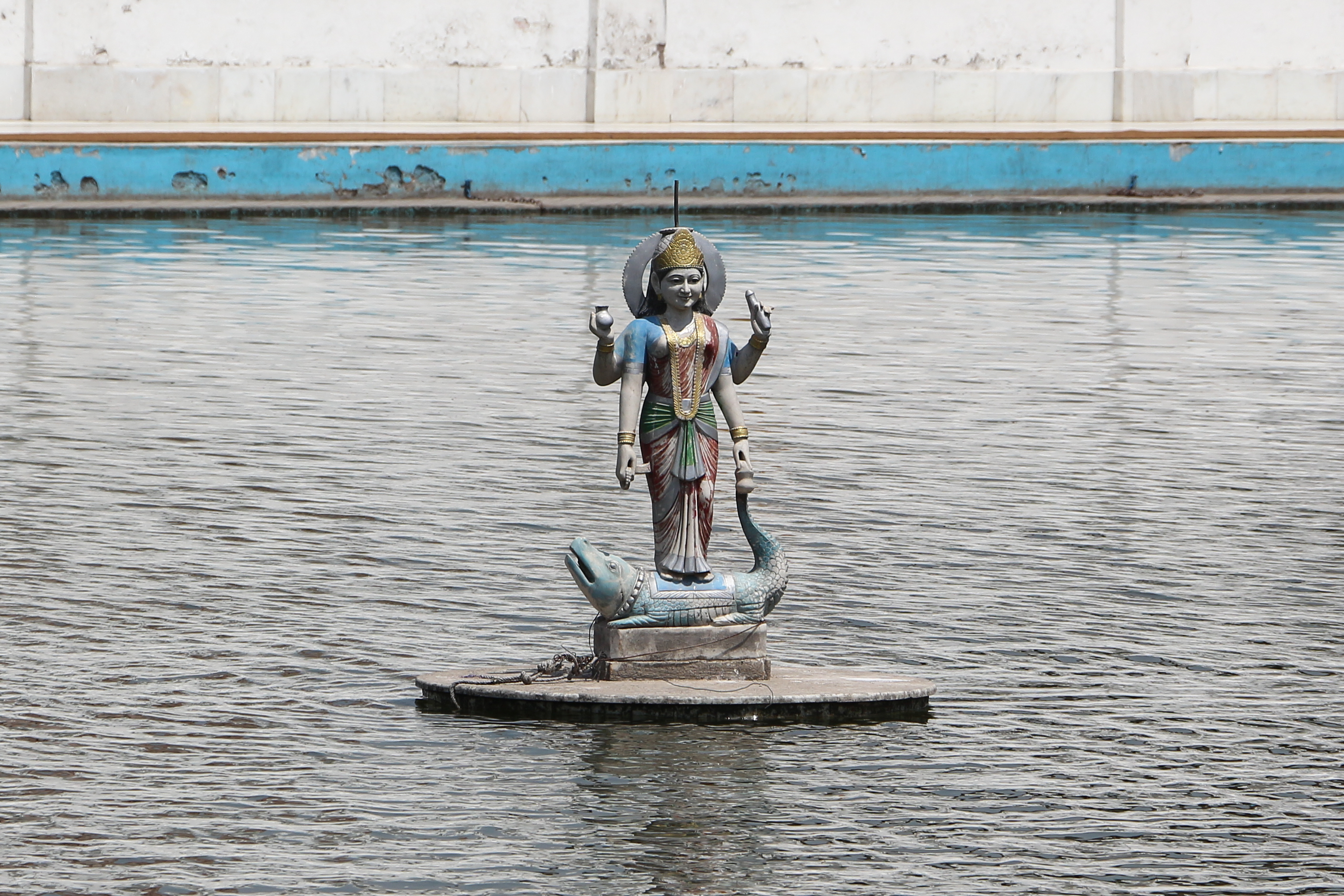

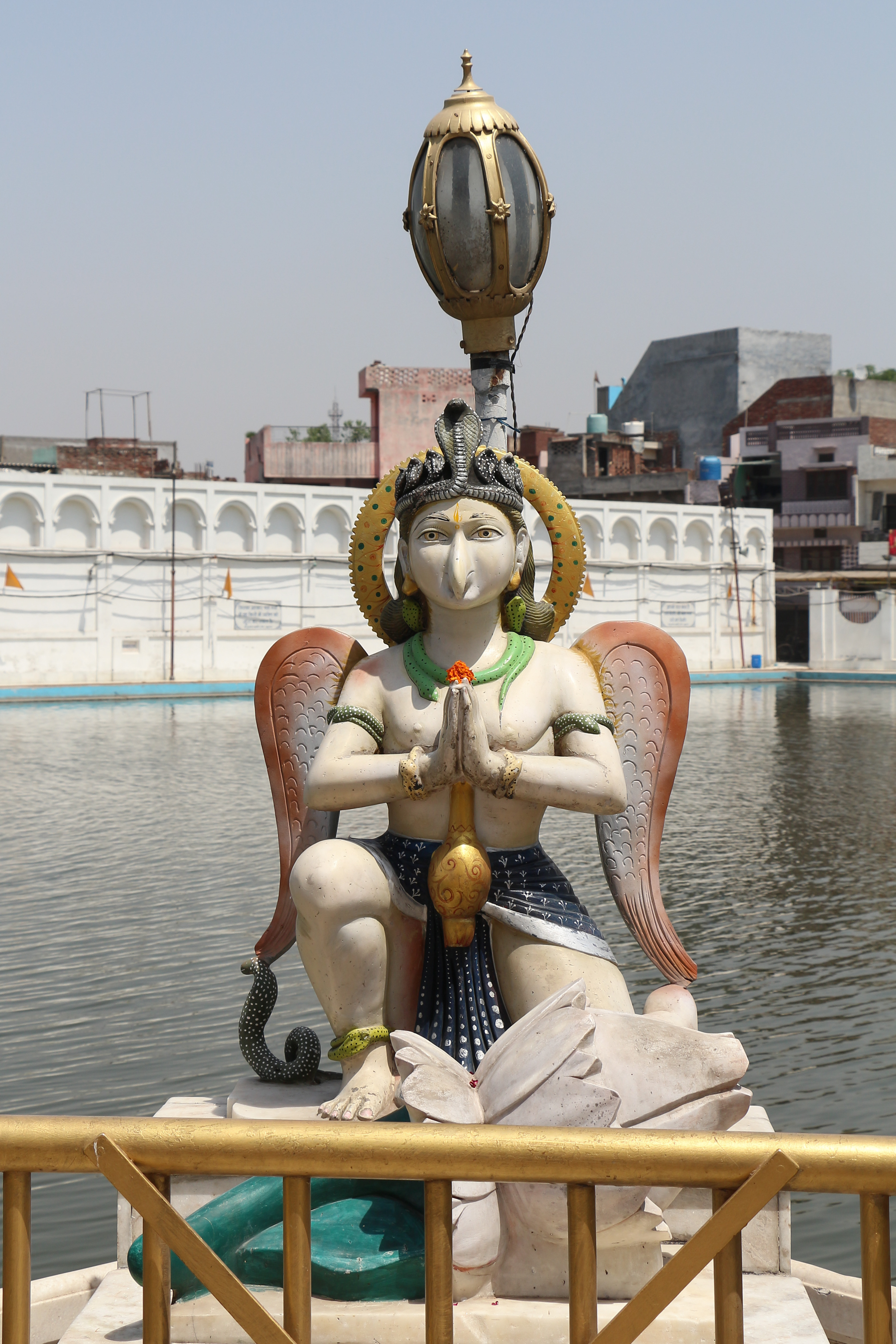

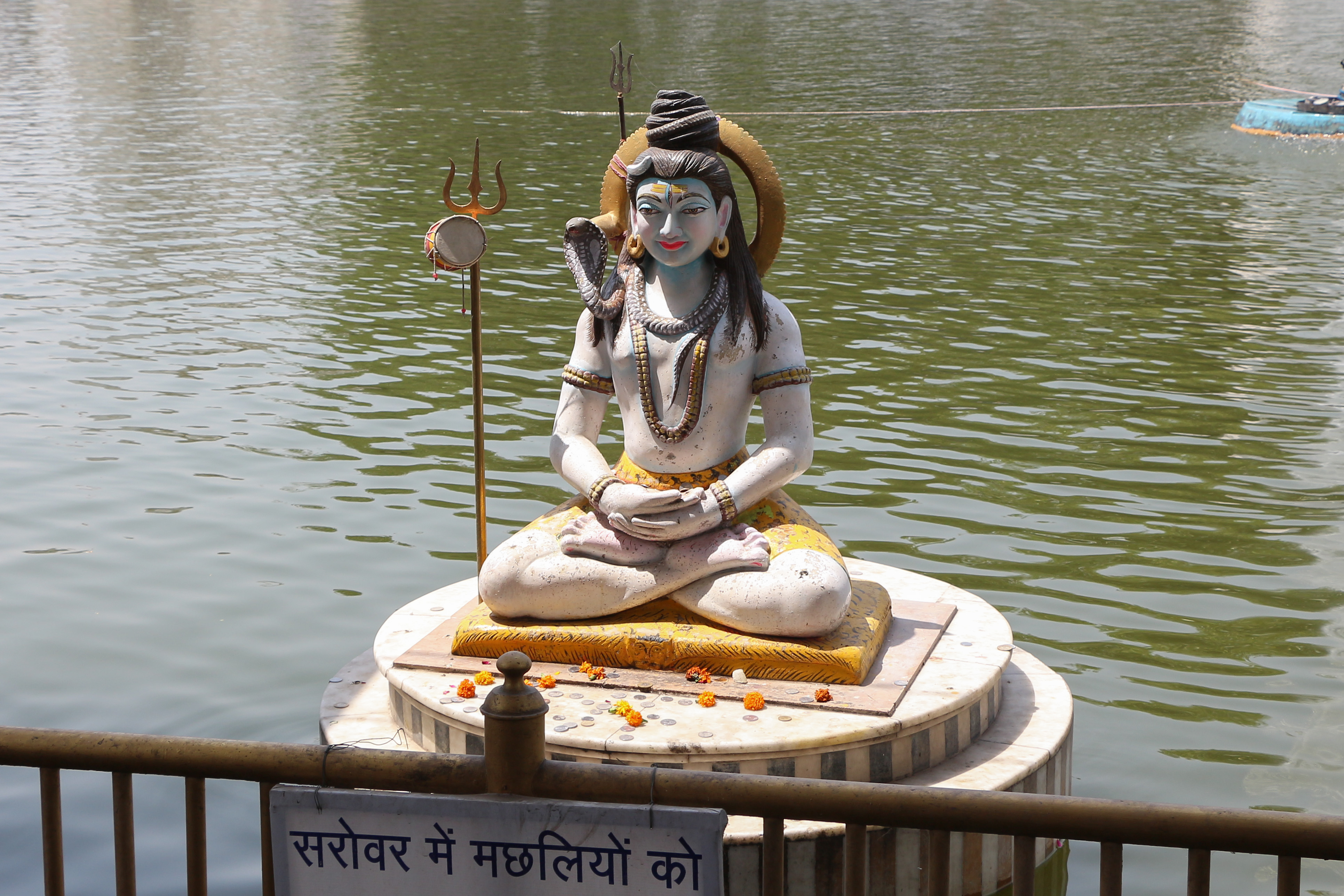
Statue of Lord Shiva

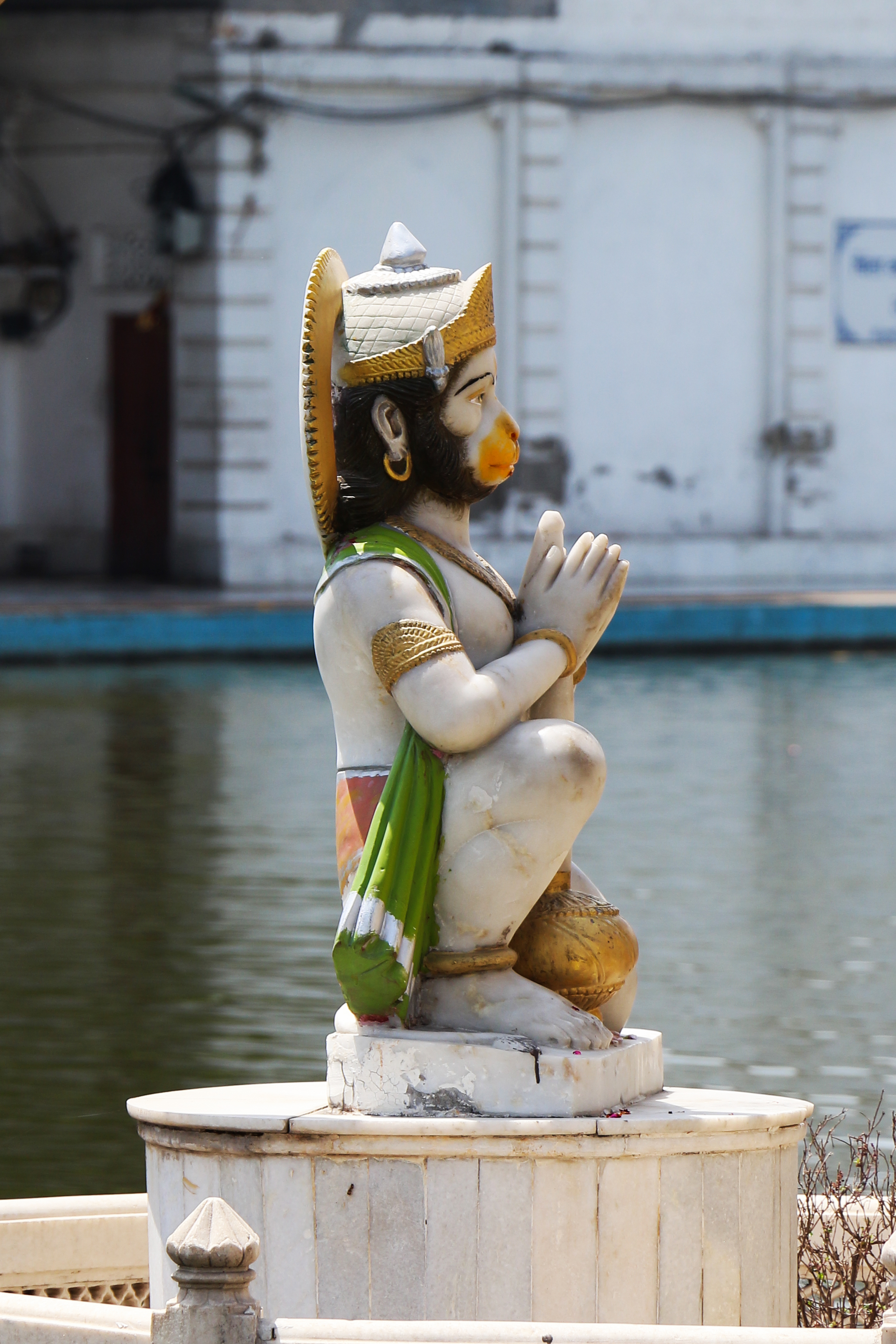
Statue of Lord Hanuman

== See also ==
- List of Hindu temples in India
- Mukteshwar Mahadev Temple
- Shri Kali Devi Temple, Patiala

== Notes ==
- Aggarwal, J. C. (1 January 1992). Modern History of Punjab: A Look Back Into Ancient Peaceful Punjab Focusing Confrontation and Failures Leading to Present Punjab Problem, and a Peep Ahead : Relevant Select Documents. Concept Publishing Company. ISBN 978-81-7022-431-0.
- Bansal, Sunita Pant (1 June 2005). Encyclopaedia of India. Smriti Books. ISBN 978-81-87967-71-2.
- Chaturvedi, B.K. (2002). Tourist Centers Of India. Diamond Pocket Books (P) Ltd. ISBN 978-81-7182-137-2.
- Gajrani, S. (2004). History, Religion and Culture of India. Gyan Publishing House. ISBN 978-81-8205-060-0.
