= Lawrence Bishnoi =

Indian gang member (born 1993)

- Born: Balkaran Brar; 12 February 1993 (age 33); Dutarawali, Fazilka district, Punjab, India
- Education: DAV College (BA); Panjab University (LLB)
- Occupations: Gangster, drug trafficker, smuggler, racketeer
- Years active: 2009–present
- Known for: Assassination of Sidhu Moose Wala, Hardeep Singh Nijjar, Sukhdool Singh Gill, Sukhdev Singh Gogamedi and Baba Siddique; Life threat to Salman Khan and many others
- Height: 5 ft 8" (173 cm)
- Judicial status: Imprisoned
- Spouse(s): Kajal (fiancée, died 2011)
- Criminal charges: Organised crime, drug trafficking, extortion, targeted killing

Details
- Country: India; Canada; United States

Lawrence Bishnoi (12 February 1993) is a Indian drug trafficker, gang leader, smuggler and a Canada-designated terrorist who attained notoriety as the kingpin of the "Bishnoi Gang".

The Bishnoi Gang is listed as a Terrorist Entity by Canada due to its alleged involvement in a wave of extortions and shootings targeting the South Asian diaspora in the United States and Canada. Bishnoi has denied all allegations.

== Early life and education ==
Bishnoi was born on 12 February 1993 as Balkaran Brar to a Bishnoi family in the village of Dutarawali, located in the Fazilka district of Punjab state of India. While in school, he adopted the name "Lawrence Bishnoi". There are several stories about why he changed his name. Bishnoi reportedly told the Delhi Police that his paternal aunt suggested the name. Jupinderjit Singh, a journalist and author, claimed that his mother gave him the name after the British officer Henry Lawrence due to his fair and "European" complexion.

His father, a former constable in the Haryana Police, left the force in 1997 and took up farming. During his school days, Bishnoi used to wear expensive shoes and ride his own bike. He also used to financially assist children who were in need of money in his native village. Bishnoi completed his early education in Abohar, Punjab, before moving to Chandigarh in 2010 to attend the DAV College.

In 2011, while studying at Panjab University, Bishnoi became actively involved in student politics, joining the Punjab University Campus Students Punjab. During this time, he formed a close association with Goldy Brar, who would later become a notorious gangster. The two became increasingly involved in university politics, allegedly leading to criminal activities. Bishnoi went on to complete his LL.B. from Punjab University.

== Criminal life ==
Bishnoi's criminal career began in Chandigarh between 2010 and 2012, where several First Information Reports (FIRs) were registered against him for attempted murder, trespassing, assault, and robbery. These cases were tied to his involvement in student politics. Out of seven FIRs filed against him in Chandigarh, Bishnoi was acquitted in four, while three cases remain pending.

=== Rise in crime and gang formation ===
Bishnoi gang
- Founded: Early 2010s
- Founder: Lawrence Bishnoi (Balkaran Brar)
- Named after: Bishnoi community
- Founding location: Chandigarh, Punjab, India
- Years active: 2010s–present
- Territory: India (Punjab, Haryana, Rajasthan and Delhi), UAE (Dubai), North America (Canada and United States), and parts of Europe (United Kingdom and Spain)
- Leaders: Lawrence Bishnoi, Anmol Bishnoi and Goldy Brar (based in Canada)
- Activities: Assassination, homicide, assault, extortion, smuggling, contract killing, cybercrime (Crypto fraud and laundering), armed robbery and theft, arms and drug trafficking, state-sponsored terrorism (allegedly)
- Allies: Punjab underwolrd R&AW (allegedly)
- Notable members: Rohit Godara, Jagdeep Singh, Sukraj Kong, Anil Pandit and Harry Boxer

While in jail, Bishnoi forged alliances with other prisoners, contributing to his gang's growth. After his release, he formed connections with arms dealers and expanded his criminal operations, particularly during his time at Punjab University. After graduating in 2013, Bishnoi allegedly escalated his violent activities by murdering a winning candidate in the Government College student elections in Sri Muktsar Sahib, and a rival candidate in the Ludhiana Municipal Corporation elections. He also became involved in liquor dealing, and began sheltering murderers in his gang. In 2014, he had an armed confrontation with the Rajasthan Police, resulting in his imprisonment.

=== Association with Rocky and Bharatpur Jail ===
Bishnoi built a relationship with Jaswinder Singh, also known as "Rocky," a gangster-turned-politician. Rocky was assassinated in 2016 by Jaipal Bhullar, who was later killed in 2020.

In 2021, Bishnoi was transferred to Tihar Jail in Delhi under charges related to the Maharashtra Control of Organised Crime Act (MCOCA), 1999. Authorities reported that Bishnoi was using Voice over IP (VoIP) calls to communicate with his associates. In August 2023, the Gujarat Anti-Terrorism Squad received custody of Bishnoi, citing a case of drug smuggling, and he was transferred to a high-security ward in the Sabarmati Central Jail.

== Involvement in high-profile cases ==
=== Salman Khan threat ===
In 2018, Bishnoi's associate Sampath Nehra attempted an attack on Salman Khan, linked to the 1998 blackbuck poaching case, as the Bishnois consider the blackbucks sacred. Bishnoi later issued direct threats against Khan, stating that Khan would be killed in Jodhpur.

In November 2023, Bishnoi claimed responsibility for a shooting at actor–singer Gippy Grewal's home due to his alleged association with Salman Khan. Grewal denied any friendship with Khan.

=== Assassination of Sidhu Moose Wala ===
On 29 May 2022, Punjabi singer Sidhu Moose Wala was assassinated in Mansa, Punjab. Bishnoi's associate Goldy Brar claimed responsibility for orchestrating the murder in coordination with Bishnoi. At the time, Bishnoi was in custody in Tihar Jail, but police linked his gang to the shooting.

Following the assassination, Bishnoi filed a plea in the Delhi High Court requesting protection from a possible fake encounter killing by the Punjab Police. He later withdrew his petitions from both the Delhi High Court and the Punjab and Haryana High Court.

=== Investigations and allegations involving Khalistan ===
In March 2023, the National Investigation Agency (NIA) filed a chargesheet against Lawrence Bishnoi and several others under the Unlawful Activities (Prevention) Act, 1967 as part of its investigation into an alleged nexus between organised crime syndicates and terrorist organisations. According to the NIA, Bishnoi's syndicate maintained operational links with members of Khalistani militant groups to procure weapons, logistics and financial support for criminal activities, including extortion and targeted killings.

Canadian authorities have alleged that members of the Bishnoi network targeted Khalistani separatists in Canada, including in the 2023 killing of Hardeep Singh Nijjar. In July 2026, United States federal prosecutors unsealed an indictment alleging that, while incarcerated in India, Bishnoi directed associates to carry out Nijjar's killing and announced that they intended to seek his extradition.

=== Assassination of Sukhdool Singh Gill ===
On 21 September 2023, Bishnoi claimed responsibility for the killing of Sukhdool Singh Gill (also known as Sukha Duneke), a member of the Khalistan Tiger Force in Canada.

=== Assassination of Sukhdev Singh Gogamedi ===
On 5 December 2023, Karni Sena president Sukhdev Singh Gogamedi was shot dead in Jaipur. The Bishnoi gang claimed responsibility for the assassination through Rohit Godara, a known gang member.

=== Assassination of Baba Siddique ===
The Bishnoi Gang claimed responsibility for the 12 October 2024 assassination of Baba Siddique, a former Maharashtra Cabinet minister, citing his close relationship with Salman Khan. Mumbai Police attempted to obtain custody of Bishnoi but were rejected due to an order under Section 268 of the former Code of Criminal Procedure, 1973.

=== Alleged criminal activities in the United States and Canada ===
In October 2024, the Royal Canadian Mounted Police (RCMP) alleged that criminal groups, including Bishnoi's gang, were being used by "agents of the Government of India" to target individuals linked to pro-Khalistani elements in Canada. The Washington Post reported that Indian National Security Adviser Ajit Doval met with Jody Thomas in Singapore, where Canadian officials presented evidence linking the Bishnoi gang to the killing of Hardeep Singh Nijjar, a pro-Khalistani leader. In response to the allegations about the Bishnoi gang, the Ministry of External Affairs of India has said that India asked Canada to extradite some of the members linked to the Bishnoi gang but Canada did not act on those requests and that India finds Canadian allegations "really strange".

In late September 2025, Canada added the Bishnoi Gang to its list of terrorist entities.

In late 2025 and early 2026, the RCMP linked the Bishnoi Gang to a wave of extortions and shootings targeting the South Asian diaspora in Metro Vancouver and Brampton, Ontario. The Federal Bureau of Investigation (FBI) arrested a Bishnoi member in California. In April 2026, CBC investigative news program The Fifth Estate published a report alleging the Bishnoi Gang had infiltrated Cricket Canada and was involved in corruption within the organisation and match-fixing activities, including in the Canadian national cricket team's matches at the 2026 Men's T20 World Cup.

=== Gang network and operations ===
The Bishnoi gang reportedly has over 800 members, across five Indian states and operates internationally. Despite being imprisoned, Bishnoi continues to control his syndicate through illegal communications with his associates.

Satinderjeet Singh, identified as Goldy Brar (Bishnoi's deputy), was also charged in the July 2026 U.S. indictment and remains at large. The FBI has offered a $1,000,000 reward for information leading to his arrest.

== Personal life ==
Born into a Sikh family, Bishnoi later adopted to a Hindu sect that practices strict vegetarianism and reveres nature. According to a cousin, he follows an ascetic routine in prison, meditating daily and fasting on multiple days each month.

== See also ==
- Goldy Brar – Canadian-Indian gangster (born 1994)
- Sidhu Moose Wala – Indian rapper and singer (1993–2022).
