= Arpit =

Arpit is an Indian given name. Notable people with the name include:

- Arpit Pannu (born 1996), Indian cricketer
- Arpit Ranka (born 1983), Indian model and actor
- Arpit Shukla (born 1966), Indian Police Service (IPS) officer
- Arpit Vasavada (born 1988), Indian cricketer

== See also ==
- Arpita
