= Guru Nanak Sikh Gurdwara (Surrey) =

Sikh temple in Surrey, British Columbia

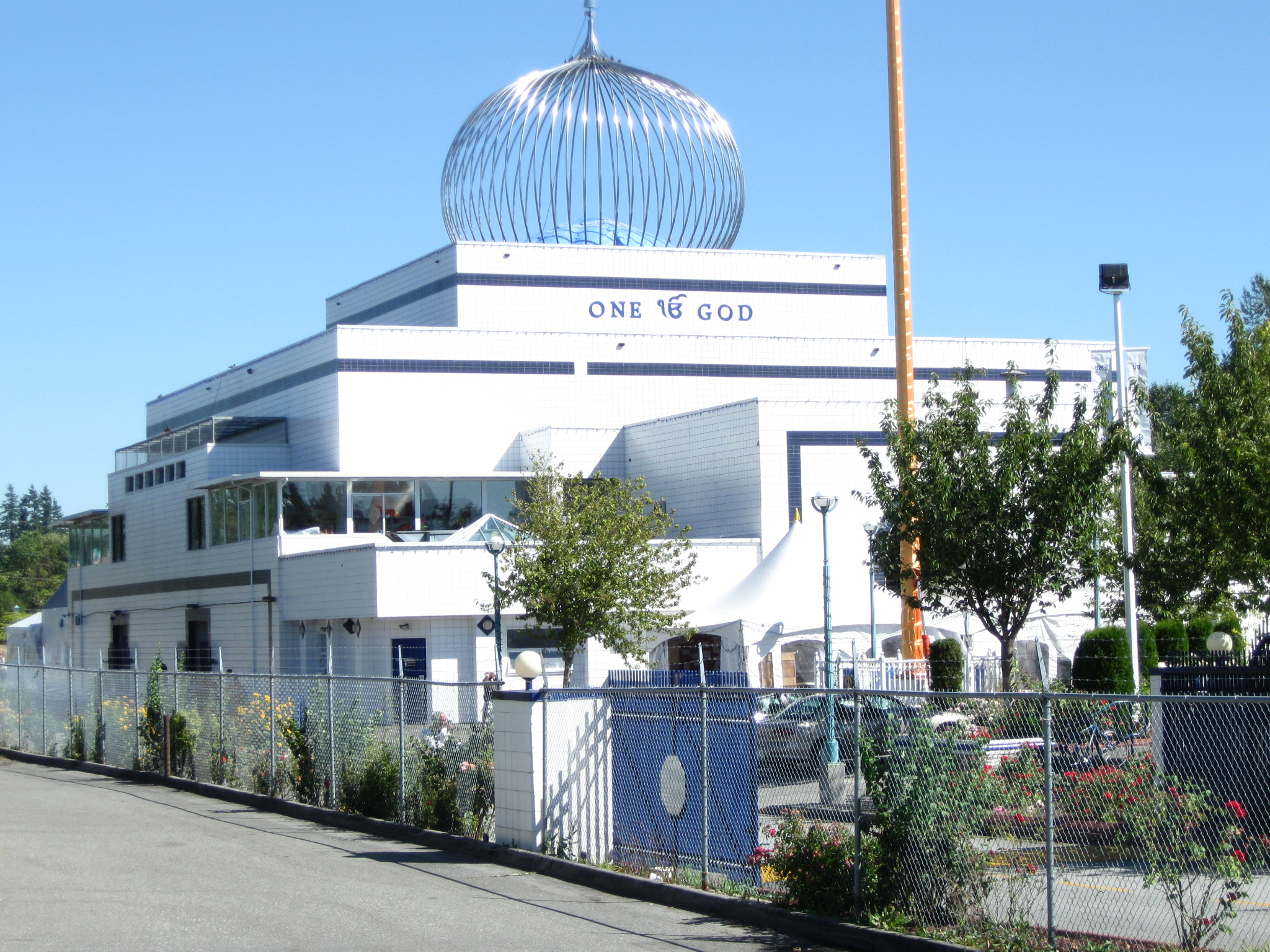
- Guru Nanak Gurdwara Delta-Surrey (2010)

Religion
- Affiliation: Sikhism

Location
- Location: Surrey, British Columbia

The Guru Nanak Sikh Gurdwara is a Sikh place of worship in Surrey, British Columbia. It gained notoriety in the aftermath of the assassination of Hardeep Singh Nijjar, the temple's president since 2019 and a Canadian Sikh who advocated for the Khalistan movement.

== Stance on Khalistan ==
According to The Globe and Mail, the early 2000s witnessed the declining influence of pro Khalistan Sikhs within Surrey's milieu, and the issue became a taboo. Nijjar, upon being elected head of the temple, set out to lift this taboo and introduced various Khalistan symbols and portraits of Sikh militants within the building. Accordingly, he aligned the temple's stance with hardline Khalistan sentiments and gave speeches censuring the Indian government. These changes provoked shock, fear and discomfort among some of the temple's attendants.

Portraits of Talwinder Singh Parmar, a Sikh militant and mastermind of the Air India bombing which killed 329 people, can be seen within the temple's dining hall. A billboard portraying Parmar has been erected outside the building, facing a major city thoroughfare. In the fall of 2023, the temple's congregants were seen yelling chants in favour of both Parmar as well as the Khalistan Tiger Force, a militant outfit the Indian government alleged Nijjar was directing. Ajaib Singh Bagri, a man acquitted in the Air India bombing trial, who gained notoriety for declaring "Until we kill 50,000 Hindus, we will not rest" at the founding convention of the World Sikh Organization, has reportedly "been staging a comeback" at the temple.
