= Arpit Shukla =

Indian police officer

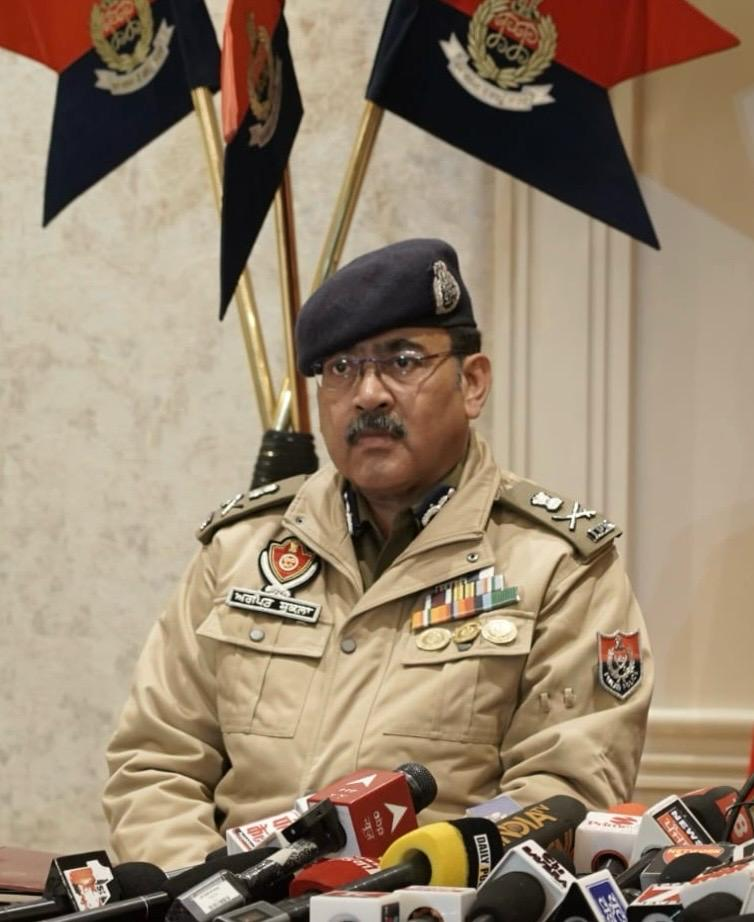
- DGP Arpit Shukla during a Press Conference at Punjab Police Headquarters, Chandigarh in 2026

Director General of Police of (Law and Order)
- Incumbent
- Assumed office 27 October 2023
- Prime Minister: Narendra Modi

Chief Director of Bureau of Investigation (BoI)
- Incumbent
- Assumed office 14 June 2020

Personal details
- Born: 24 April 1966 (age 60) New Delhi, India
- Education: (MPA) Delhi University
- Awards: President's Police Medal for Distinguished Service; Police Medal for Meritorious Service
- Police career
- Allegiance: India
- Branch: Punjab Police
- Service years: 1993 — present
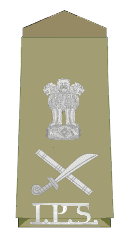
- Rank: Director General of Police

Arpit Shukla (born 24 April 1966) is an Indian Police Service (IPS) officer of the 1993 batch from the Punjab cadre. He currently serves as the Special Director General of Police (Law and Order) in the Punjab Police.

He has previously held several senior positions including Commissioner of Police (Jalandhar), Chief Director of the Bureau of Investigation (BoI), and Additional director general of police (Law and Order). He is a recipient of the President's Police Medal for Distinguished Service and the Police Medal for Meritorious Service.

== Police career ==
Shukla joined the Indian Police Service in 1993 under the Punjab cadre. He has served in several districts in various leadership capacities. In 2016, he was appointed Commissioner of Police, Jalandhar. He has also served as the Senior Superintendent of Police (SSP) in Firozpur, Patiala, Jalandhar, Gurdaspur, Sangrur, and Faridkot.

In June 2020, he was appointed Chief Director of the Bureau of Investigation (BoI), replacing Prabodh Kumar. In September 2022, he took over as Additional director general of police (Law and Order) and was promoted to the rank of Special DGP on 27 October 2023.

== Notable Operations ==
=== Operation Eagle ===
Shukla spearheaded Operation Eagle, a series of coordinated raids targeting narcotics hotspots across Punjab. In June 2024, Operation Eagle-IV mobilized over 500 police units and more than 4,000 personnel. It led to 254 arrests, 221 FIRs, and the seizure of heroin, poppy husk, pharmaceutical drugs, and illicit proceeds.

=== Investigations as Commissioner of Police, Jalandhar ===
During his tenure in Jalandhar (2015–2017), Shukla supervised several high-profile investigations, including the assassination of RSS leader Brig. Jagdish Gagneja, the murder of hawala operator Anil “Billa” Kumar, and a triple murder in Lajpat Nagar. Each of these cases resulted in arrests and significant investigative progress under his leadership.

=== Crackdown on Goldy Brar’s Network ===
In September 2023, Punjab Police under Shukla’s command conducted 1,159 coordinated raids across border districts including Amritsar, Ferozepur, Tarn Taran, and Moga. The raids targeted operatives linked to Canada-based gangster Goldy Brar, who is allegedly involved in organized crime and transnational smuggling.

=== Grenade Attack Case ===
On 8 April 2025, a grenade attack occurred at the residence of BJP leader Manoranjan Kalia in Jalandhar. The case was solved within 12 hours under Shukla’s supervision, with two accused arrested on the same day. Investigators later linked the conspiracy to Lawrence Bishnoi’s gang and a handler based in Pakistan. Arpit Shukla of the Punjab Police resolved the case within 12 hours of the explosion. Two individuals were apprehended on the same day for purportedly launching the grenade from an e-rickshaw. The additional suspects in the case include incarcerated gangster Lawrence Bishnoi and a handler residing in Pakistan, known as Shahzad Bhatti.

=== War Against Drugs ===
As of August 2025, Punjab Police had registered nearly 17,000 FIRs and arrested over 24,600 individuals as part of the Yudh Nasheyan De Virudh campaign led by Shukla. The campaign involved daily operations across all districts of Punjab and targeted drug traffickers and distribution networks.

=== Operation “Waris Punjab De” ===
In March 2023, Shukla coordinated the law enforcement response to the activities of the separatist group Waris Punjab De, led by Amritpal Singh. While core operatives were detained, Shukla also directed the release of minors and non-violent detainees, maintaining law and order while avoiding unnecessary escalation. During the Punjab Police's nationwide initiative to apprehend Amritpal and dismantle his extremist network, Shukla supervised law enforcement measures to ensure the maintenance of public order. He significantly embraced a humanitarian stance by mandating the release of numerous incarcerated teenagers who were identified as merely minor participants. During the Waris Punjab De unrest, around 207 individuals were apprehended for breaching the peace.

== Decorations ==
- President's Police Medal for Distinguished Service (2012)
- Police Medal for Meritorious Service (2006)
