= Assassination of Sidhu Moose Wala =

2022 assassination in Punjab, India

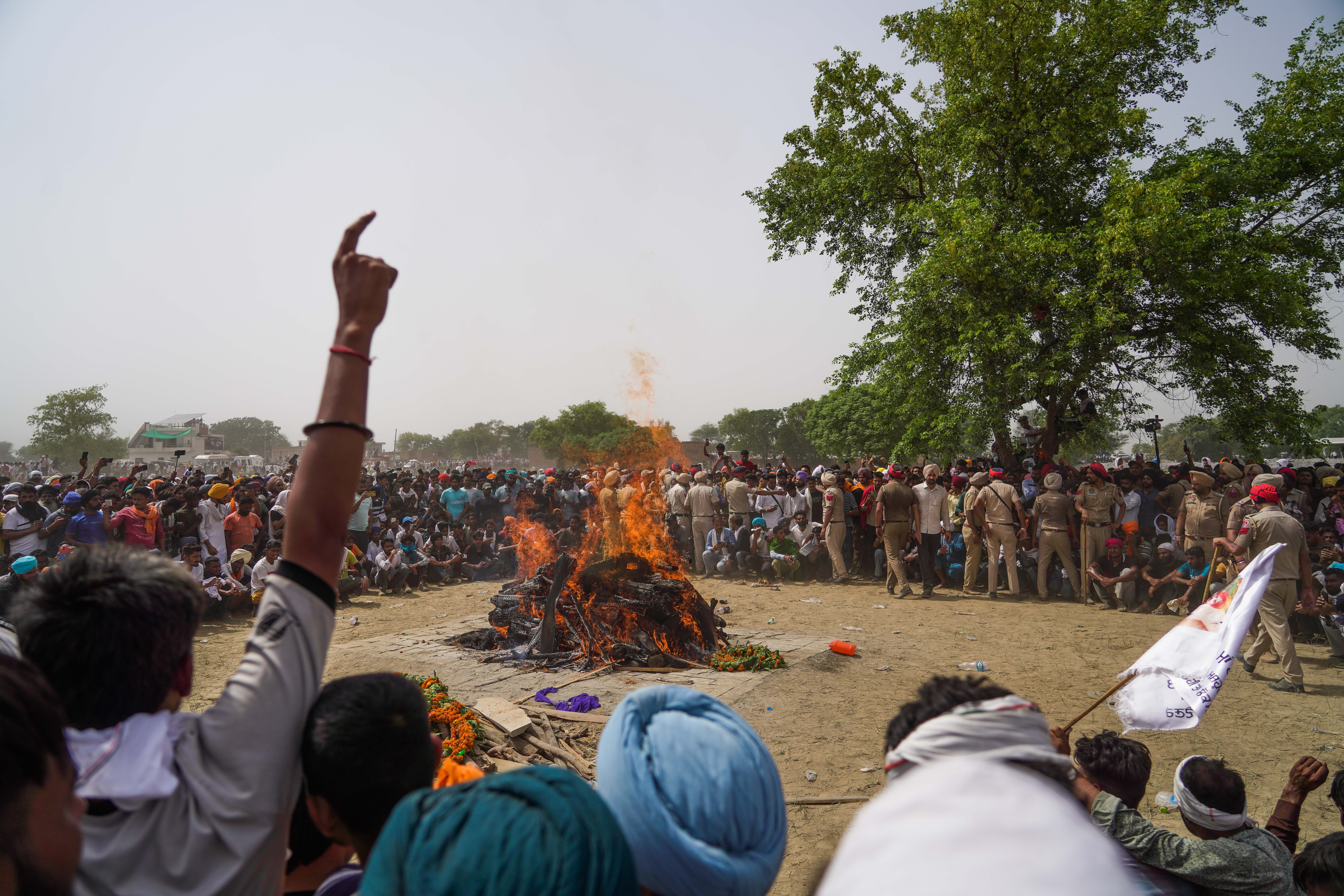
- Moose Wala's cremation on 31 May 2022
- Location: Jawaharke Village, Mansa, Punjab, India
- Date: 29 May 2022; 4 years ago 5:30 p.m. (IST)
- Target: Sidhu Moose Wala
- Attack type: Murder by drive-by shooting, assassination
- Weapons: AK-47, AN-94, AKM, AK-56
- Deaths: 1 (Sidhu Moose Wala)
- Injuries: 2
- Perpetrators: 5
- Accused: Lawrence Bishnoi; Goldy Brar

The Indian Punjabi rapper Sidhu Moose Wala was assassinated by unidentified assailants in his car on 29 May 2022 in Jawaharke village of Mansa. Moose Wala was 28. According to police, Lawrence Bishnoi's gang claimed responsibility for the murder in an unverified Facebook post, but Bishnoi denied making the claim. Nevertheless, Bishnoi was being held by the Punjab Police as of June 2022 who considered him the "mastermind" of the murder.

Moose Wala was one of 424 people whose police security was reduced or entirely removed the day before his murder in preparation for the anniversary of Operation Blue Star, leaving him with two commandos instead of four. At the time of the incident, Moose Wala was travelling in his private car accompanied by two others instead of his bullet-proof vehicle with the commandos. According to his friends, Moose Wala did not take his security along with him, as his Thar SUV could not accommodate five people.

== Aftermath ==
According to police, the Bishnoi gang claimed to have killed Moose Wala in 2021 in order to avenge the murder of an Akali Youth leader, Vicky Middukhera. The Bishnoi gang claimed Moose Wala's aide had a role in the killing of Middukhera, although no legal evidence supports this claim. A Canada-based Punjabi gangster, Satinder Singh a.k.a. Goldy Brar, claimed responsibility for the murder. Brar, a top-ranking member of the Bishnoi gang, claimed that his "Punjab module" carried out the shooting. Both Brar and Bishnoi have criminal cases against them in India. The Punjab Police later confirmed the Bishnoi gang's involvement.

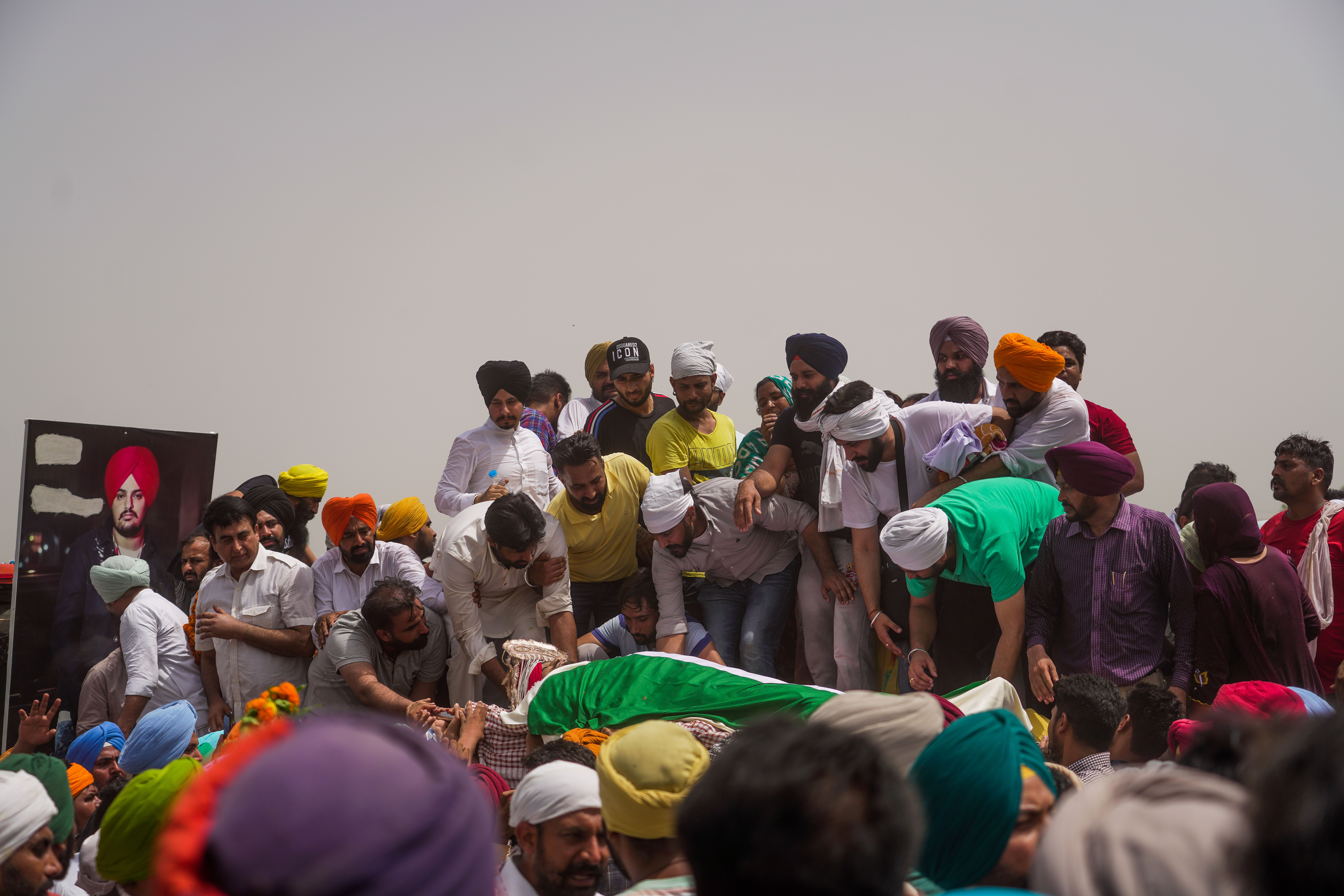
Sidhu Moose Wala's parents and fans at his cremation

According to the police report, Moose Wala's father revealed that Moose Wala had been receiving death threats from gangsters for extortion purposes, a statement corroborated by singer Mika Singh.

Two of the accused in the murder of Sidhu Moosewala were killed in a jail fight with gang rivals and a third accused in Moosewala’s murder was severely injured in the Goindwal Sahib Central Jail in Punjab's Tarn Taran district.

Punjab Chief Minister Bhagwant Mann condemned the murder, calling Moose Wala "a cultural icon of Punjab". He expressed shock and grief about the singer's death and consoled the aggrieved family. Mann ordered an investigation into why the Punjab Police reduced Moose's security detail two days prior to his murder. He also announced that a judicial commission headed by a sitting judge of the Punjab and Haryana High Court would be set up to investigate the killing. Numerous celebrities offered their condolences on social media.

Police found bullets from an AN-94 Russian assault rifle and a pistol at the spot of the killing. Police had detained six suspects of the incident from the state of Uttarakhand. On 30 May, one of the murder suspects was detained by the Punjab Police while he was hiding among the pilgrims of Gurudwara Shri Hemkund Sahib.

On 30 May, the Delhi unit of the INC staged a protest near AAP leader Arvind Kejriwal's residence holding the AAP-ruled Government of Punjab responsible for the incident, blaming their decision to curtail Moose Wala's security cover.

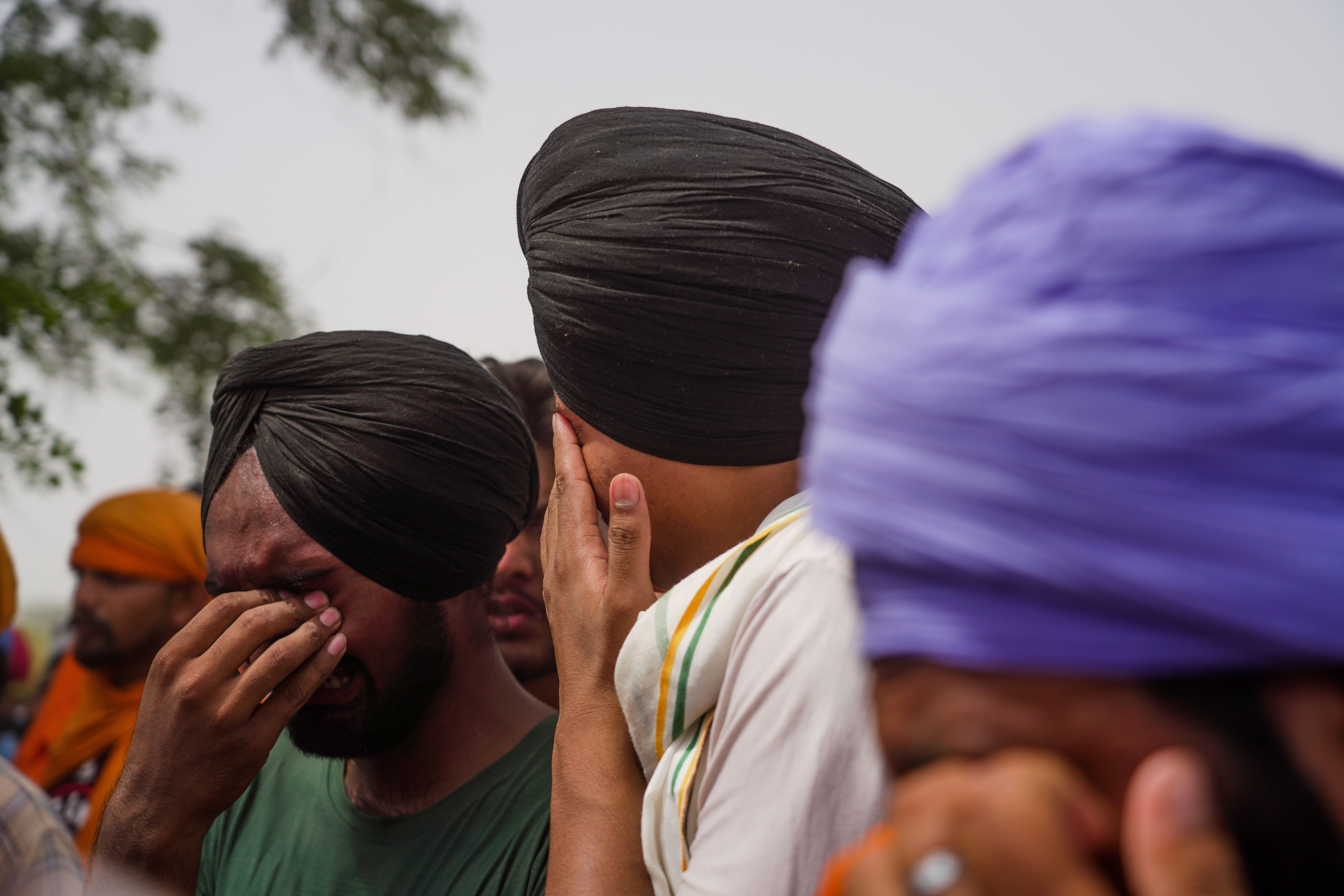
Fans in tears at Moose Wala's funeral

His autopsy was carried out by five doctors, and the event was videographed. According to post mortem reports, Moose Wala received 19 bullet injuries, and he died within 15 minutes of being shot due to the wounds.

Moose Wala was cremated in his ancestral village on 31 May. His last rites were performed on his farmland.

On 3 June, Bishnoi allegedly admitted to being involved in the murder and that he had a rivalry with Moose Wala. On 8 June, a bhog ceremony was arranged in Mansa. On 3 July, Ankit Sirsa was arrested by Delhi police for being one of the shooters involved in the killing. On 20 July, gangsters Manpreet Mannu and Jagrup Rupa, suspected of involvement in Moose Wala's killing, were gunned down by the Punjab Police. On 26 July, India TV reported that Punjab Police arrested the last absconding shooter, Deepak Mundi. However, The Indian Express reported that he was arrested on 11 September near the Bengal-Nepal border.

== Politics ==
Before the Sangrur Lok Sabha by-election in 2022, the INC had used pictures of Moose Wala in its election song. The family of Moose Wala made a public appeal to political parties and individuals, asking them to not use his name for political or personal motives. The move was also criticised by the Aam Aadmi Party.
