= Hardeep Singh Nijjar =

Canadian Sikh separatist (1977–2023)

- Born: 11 October 1977; Bhar Singh Pura, Punjab, India
- Died: 18 June 2023 (aged 45); Surrey, British Columbia, Canada
- Cause of death: Multiple gunshots
- Citizenship: India (until 2007); Canada (from 2007)
- Organization: Sikhs for Justice
- Movement: Khalistan

Hardeep Singh Nijjar (11 October 1977 – 18 June 2023) was a Canadian Sikh involved with the Khalistan movement. He was a prominent member of the Sikhs for Justice (SFJ) and spearheaded the group's Khalistan Referendum campaign.

Born in India, Nijjar emigrated to Canada in the mid-1990s. The Indian government accused him of being a criminal and terrorist affiliated with the militant Khalistan Tiger Force (KTF), and sought his arrest. Nijjar and his supporters rejected these allegations, saying he advocated peaceful means for creation of Khalistan. In 2016, Nijjar was placed on Canada's No Fly List and had his personal bank accounts frozen following allegations of his involvement in "terror training camps". Nijjar gained prominence in 2019, when he became the leader of Guru Nanak Sikh Gurdwara in Surrey, British Columbia, and became an advocate of Sikh separatism.

On 18 June 2023, Nijjar was shot and killed in the parking lot of Guru Nanak Sikh Gurdwara. On 18 September 2023, Canadian prime minister Justin Trudeau stated that Canadian intelligence agencies were "pursuing credible allegations of a potential link" between Indian government agents and the assassination of Nijjar. After the killing, Canada expelled an Indian diplomat from the country. India's foreign ministry denied involvement in the killing, and expelled a top Canadian diplomat as a retaliatory measure. These measures sparked a diplomatic row.

In May 2024, the Royal Canadian Mounted Police (RCMP) arrested three Indian nationals, who were charged with killing Nijjar. The Canadian investigations are ongoing, including into possible connections between the killing and the Indian government. In October 2024, Canada expelled six Indian diplomats, including the High Commissioner Sanjay Kumar Verma, as persona non grata. This occurred after Canada said they provided India with "irrefutable evidence" of links between Indian government agents and the murders of both Nijjar and Sukhdool Singh, who was shot in Winnipeg on 20 September 2023; Canadian officials say that the six officials were "directly involved in gathering detailed intelligence on Sikh separatists who were then killed, attacked or threatened by India's criminal proxies". India responded by calling the claims "preposterous" and expelling six Canadian diplomats in a tit-for-tat move.

On July 8, 2026, the US charged Lawrence Bishnoi and his associates with the killing of Nijjar. The indictment does not allege any Indian government role in the killing. The US is seeking extradition of Bishnoi, who is in prison in India.

== Early life and immigration to Canada ==
Hardeep Singh Nijjar was born on October 11, 1977, in Bhar Singh Pura, a village in the Phillaur tehsil of the Jalandhar district, of Punjab, India. Nijjar's family had often provided refuge to Sikh militants in the midst of the Punjab insurgency, Nijjar claimed that he was inspired to join the Sikh militant movement by Anokh Singh Babbar, a founding member of the Babbar Khalsa, and a frequent visitor to the Nijjar farm. He migrated to Canada in the mid-1990s. According to The Tribune, Nijjar was arrested in India in 1995 amidst a crackdown on the armed insurgency in Punjab. According to The Globe and Mail, Nijjar told his friends that he was apprehended by the police because of his association with the architects of the 1995 assassination of Indian Punjab's chief minister, Beant Singh; a claim he withheld from Canadian immigration authorities. Nijjar emigrated to Canada in the mid-1990s.

Nijjar arrived in Canada on 10 February 1997, using a fraudulent passport that identified him as "Ravi Sharma", and made a refugee claim. In a sworn affidavit, he indicated that his brother, father and uncle had all been arrested, and he himself had been tortured by police. His claim was rejected, as officials thought his documentation was partially fabricated; officials suspected that a letter, supposedly written by an Indian physician and attesting to his torture, was forged. The panel wrote that it did "not believe that the claimant was arrested by the police and that he was tortured by the police."

Eleven days after his claim was denied, Nijjar married a woman who sponsored his immigration. Officials noted that the woman had arrived in Canada in 1997, married to another man, and rejected the claim as a marriage of convenience. In 2001, Nijjar appealed this ruling but lost.

He was ultimately permitted entry into Canada. According to Marc Miller, the Canadian Minister of Immigration, Refugees and Citizenship, Nijjar became a Canadian citizen on 25 May 2007.

== Involvement with Sikh organisations ==
In Canada, Nijjar operated a plumbing business and was married with two sons. He lived in Surrey, British Columbia, where he was a leader of the local Sikh community. Nijjar gained prominence in 2019, when he became the leader of Guru Nanak Sikh Gurdwara in Surrey, British Columbia, and became an advocate of Sikh separatism. He became the president of the Guru Nanak Sikh Gurdwara, a Sikh temple in Surrey, in 2019. The New York Times described the congregation as "the oldest, largest and most politically powerful of the dozen or so Sikh temples in Surrey." Nijjar was re-affirmed as president of Guru Nanak Sikh Gurdwara in 2022.

Nijjar was a leader of the Canadian branch of Sikhs for Justice. In 2012, he circulated petitions collecting signatures, calling on the United Nations to recognize anti-Sikh violence in India in 1984 as a genocide. In the months before his death, he was organizing an unofficial referendum among the Sikh diaspora, sponsored by Sikhs for Justice, in support of the Khalistan movement, which seeks an independent Sikh state. The Khalistan movement is banned in India, but has support within the Sikh diaspora. After his death, the World Sikh Organization of Canada said that Nijjar "often led peaceful protests against the violation of human rights actively taking place in India and in support of Khalistan."

As a religious leader, Nijjar held special prayers for the Muslims slain in the 2019 Christchurch mosque shootings in New Zealand and for the Canadian indigenous children buried in unmarked graves at Canadian residential schools. He also called for the release of G. N. Saibaba, a human rights activist imprisoned in India.

According to a voice recording obtained by The Globe and Mail, he advocated for the use of weapons against Indian opponents, stating, "We will have to take up arms. We will have to dance to the edges of swords." He also criticized Sikhs who support Khalistan through activism and political means, remarking, "Those who advocate peaceful methods, we need to leave them behind. What justice will we get this way?"

Nijjar had a dispute with Ripudaman Singh Malik, a Canadian Sikh who had been acquitted over involvement in the 1985 bombing of Air India Flight 182. Malik and a partner purchased a commercial printing press to use to print Sikh religious scripture, but later sued Nijjar in a civil lawsuit in British Columbia, alleging that Nijjar had failed to return the press that Malik had given him for safekeeping. After Malik was murdered in July 2022, several Indian news reports, quoting Indian intelligence officials, speculated that Nijjar was somehow linked to Malik's death. Nijjar denounced these claims, saying that he was friendly with Malik, that he sent his son to a school founded by Malik, and that he respected Malik's work within the Sikh community; Nijjar's lawyer said that Nijjar was "being vindictively targeted and accused of crimes solely based on dissenting political opinions."

== Allegations of militant activities ==
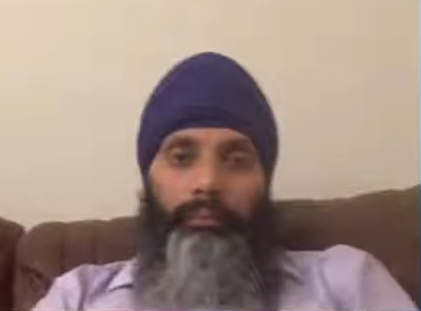
Nijjar in 2020

The Indian government accused Nijjar of being the leader of pro-Khalistan militant group Khalistan Tiger Force (KTF). Nijjar was also associated with Sikhs for Justice (SFJ), and spearheaded the group's Khalistan Referendum 2020 campaign. At the Indian government's request, two Interpol red notices were issued against Nijjar, in 2014 and 2016. The first accused him of being a "mastermind/active member" of Khalistan Tiger Force and said that suspects arrested in connection with the 2007 Shingaar cinema hall bomb blast in Ludhiana had implicated him. Gurpatwant Singh Pannun, a Canadian-American lawyer, activist, and associate of Nijjar's, said that Nijjar was acquitted of involvement in a conspiracy.

The Indian government and intelligence agencies alleged that Nijjar visited Pakistan in 2012–14, where he met with militant leader Jagtar Singh Tara of Babbar Khalsa International, was recruited and groomed by Pakistan's intelligence agency, received arms and explosives training, and under Tara's directive, was sent to Canada in 2013 to receive handheld GPS device training. In Pakistan, he was photographed brandishing an AK-47 and on a gurdwara rooftop with Tara. In 2015, the Indian government asked that Canadian authorities surveil Nijjar over suspicions of his involvement in a plot to transport ammunition into India using a paraglider. Nijjar said that this claim was "absolutely preposterous" and "more like a bad Bollywood movie plot."

In 2016, Surrey plumber Mandeep Singh Dhaliwal, was apprehended by the Punjab Police during a visit to Punjab, India, he later told the police that Nijjar had directed him to commit violent acts against "sect leaders," leading the Indian media to circulate articles claiming that Khalistani "terror training camps" were operating in the British Columbia wilderness. The 2016 Interpol red notice, issued at the request of Indian authorities, accused Nijjar of being the "mastermind and key conspirator of many terrorist acts in India"; India accused Nijjar of conspiring to kill "Hindu leaders" and claimed that Nijjar was running a Sikh terrorist training camp near Mission, British Columbia. Following these allegations, the RCMP questioned Nijjar, and he was subsequently placed on Canada's No Fly List and had his personal bank accounts frozen. For an undisclosed period of time, Nijjar was on the Interpol watch list, in 2016, his name was removed from the list with the assistance of Gurpatwant Singh Pannun. In a letter sent in 2016 to Canadian prime minister Justin Trudeau, Nijjar called the Indian government's accusations "fabricated, baseless, fictitious and politically motivated" and part of a smear campaign seeking to discredit him. Anonymous sources close to Dhaliwal told the Globe that Nijjar led 5 Sikh men to partake in various clandestine activities, including weapons training, target practice, and GPS practice in Lower Mainland BC.

In 2018, the Indian government again accused Nijjar of "multiple targeted killings" in India, and in February 2018, Amarinder Singh, Chief Minister of Indian Punjab included Nijjar on a list of "most wanted persons" given to Canadian prime minister Trudeau. In a statement, Nijjar said: "I am being targeted and framed in false criminal cases by Indian authorities for my relentless campaign against the genocidal violence against the Sikhs and continuous support for Referendum 2020 to liberate Punjab and create separate Sikh country Khalistan." The Hindustan Times reported that the Surrey unit of the RCMP briefly detained Nijjar for questioning in April 2018, released him within 24 hours without laying any charges.

In 2020, India designated Nijjar a terrorist under the Unlawful Activities (Prevention) Act, saying that he was "involved in exhorting seditionary and insurrectionary imputations and also attempting to create disharmony among different communities in India." The same year, amid protests by Indian farmers against new agriculture laws, the Indian government filed a criminal case against him, one of a number of cases that authorities filed against Sikh activists living both at home and abroad; the government initially attempted to discredit the farmers' protest by associating it with Sikh nationalism. In 2022, India's National Investigation Agency (NIA) accused him of plotting to kill a Hindu priest in Punjab, and offered a reward of ₹1,000,000 (approximately CA$16,200) for any information that could help apprehend him.

In June 2024, The Globe and Mail released a report on Nijjar one year after his death in which they had obtained "a handful" of recordings of Nijjar making speeches calling for the use of violence against Indian adversaries. The report states that although supporters of Khalistan say Nijjar "simply leaned heavily into the warrior imagery prevalent in Sikh culture," "interviews with people who knew Mr. Nijjar reveal he was indeed steeped in Sikh extremism," and that associates have further "not tried to hide" that he had "underworld associates." The report summarizes accusations by the Indian government apparatus that Nijjar spearheaded various criminal activities in India, including the 2007 Shingaar cinema bombing, and says that they did not provide compelling evidence to substantiate these claims. Initial court proceedings did not make any mention of Nijjar or his involvement. The report states that some Canadian security experts did not believe India's claims about him, remarking that "Indian intelligence officials have a reputation for torqueing evidence to fit with political objectives" and that there was inadequate evidence to arrest Nijjar, or they'd have done so "a long time ago." The report also noted, that much of Indian allegations against Nijjar are based on anonymous confessions or sworn statements from people in Indian custody; groups such as the World Sikh Organization believe they were obtained through torture and thus unreliable. The confessions allege that Nijjar was directing violent acts in Punjab targeting non Sikhs and wealthy businessmen. Indian High Commissioner Sanjay Kumar Verma's dismissal of Nijjar's support for the 2020 referendum as "our definition of terrorism" was also noted by the report as "not a definition Canada – or many other democracies – share."

The report confirmed Nijjar's close friendship with a member of the Khalistan Commando Force (KCF) via the member's brother, and says Nijjar maintained a close relationship to Jagtar Singh Tara, a conspirator in the assassination of Punjab chief minister Beant Singh, and head of various Sikh militant groups, including the KCF and the KTF. Following Tara's arrest in 2014, claims that Nijjar was directing the KTF gained traction within his milieu. During a 2015 meeting in the Guru Nanak Gurdwara, Nijjar denied being in charge of KTF, although he claimed to know several members involved the organization; Tara's lawyer told the Globe that Nijjar was appointed by Tara to take over the KTF's leadership after his arrest.

== Death, subsequent diplomatic dispute and criminal investigation ==
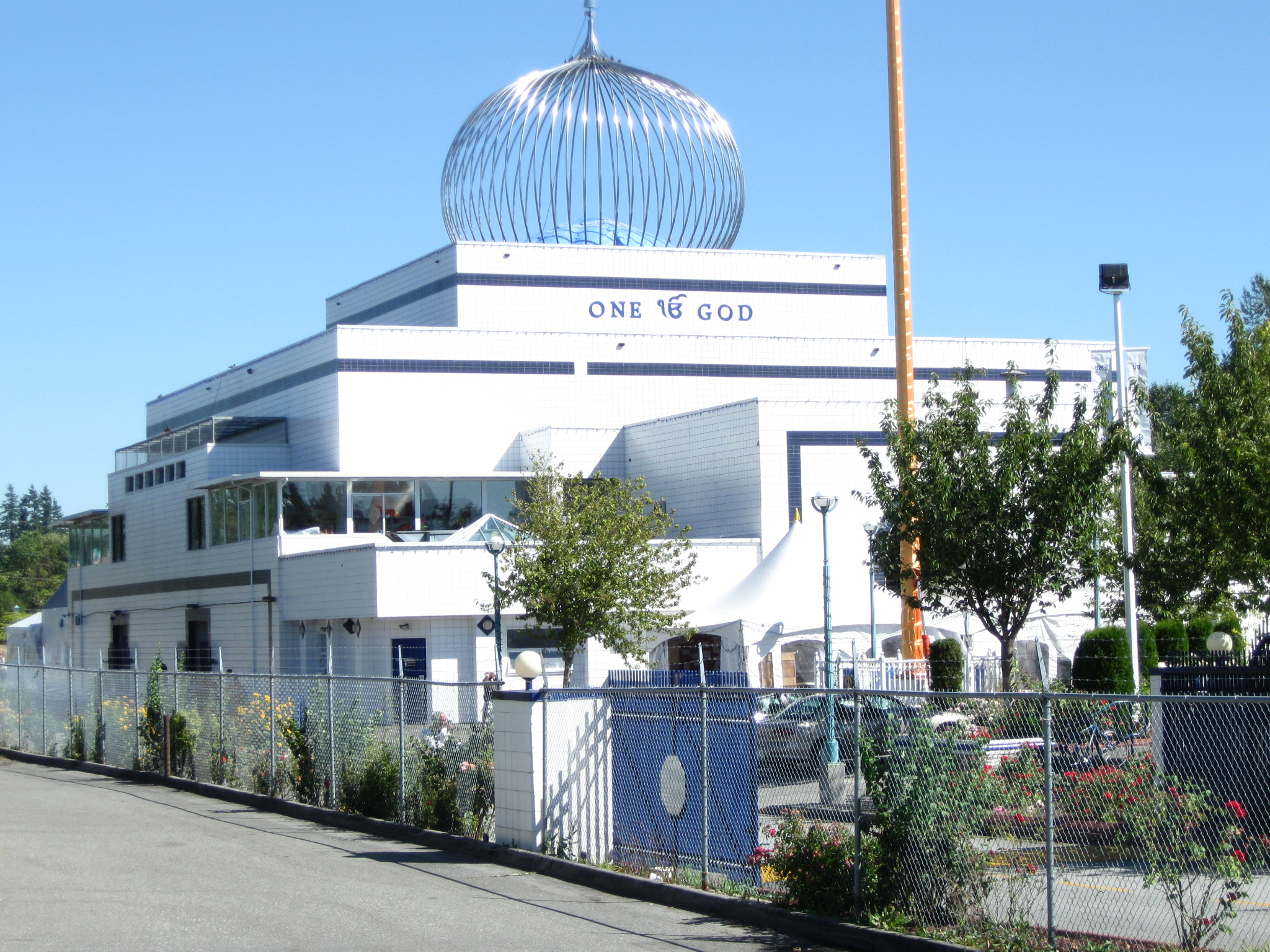
The Guru Nanak Gurdwara, outside of which Nijjar was killed

In the early northern summer of 2022, Nijjar was alerted by Canadian Security Intelligence Service (CSIS) officials of a likely assassination plot against him. According to his son, Nijjar had been meeting with CSIS officers "once or twice a week" in the days before his killing, and had another meeting scheduled two days after he was killed. CSIS officers warned Nijjar of threats to his life and advised him to stay at home.

On 18 June 2023, Nijjar was shot and killed in his pickup truck by two masked gunmen in the parking lot of the Guru Nanak Sikh Gurdwara in Surrey, British Columbia. He walked out of the gurdwara that evening and was gunned down approximately two minutes later, in his Dodge Ram. He was hit by 34 bullets. Police received a report of a shooting at the gurdwara at 8:27 p.m. The gunmen (whom investigators described as "heavier set") fled the scene by foot into a waiting car (later identified as a silver 2008 Toyota Camry) that sped away. Investigators said the two gunmen and the getaway-car driver had lain in wait for at least an hour before the murder. Nijjar's death is being investigated by the RCMP's Integrated Homicide Investigation Team (IHIT). Video footage and witness accounts compiled by The Washington Post showed a coordinated attack, involving at least six men and two vehicles. The Post noted the police were slow to respond; the RCMP and Surrey police argued over jurisdiction; and local businesses indicated they had not been canvassed for security camera footage.

=== Criminal investigation in Canada ===
In September 2023, prime minister Justin Trudeau said Canadian security agencies have opened an investigation into Nijjar's killing, which officers suspect of having been ordered by India. At the time, Trudeau warned that "any involvement of a foreign government in the killing of a Canadian citizen on Canadian soil is an unacceptable violation of our sovereignty."

In May 2024, the RCMP arrested three people—Karan Brar, age 22, Kamal Preet Singh, age 22, and Karan Preet Singh, age 28—in connection with Nijjar's slaying. All three were charged with first-degree murder and conspiracy to commit murder. According to police, the three men are all Indian nationals who had been living in Edmonton and had been present in Canada for between three and five years. Three other murders, such as the killing of an 11-year-old boy in Edmonton, were also being investigated as having a connection with the group and Nijjar's killing, but are not suspected of being connected to the Indian government. The three men were present in Canada on temporary visas and are allegedly associated with the gang of Lawrence Bishnoi. (Note: A report in the Indian press stated that Karan Brar was from Kotkapura, Faridkot district, and traveled to Canada on a study visa; that Karanpreet Singh was from Sundal village in Batala police district and traveled to Canada on a work permit; and that Kamalpreet Singh was from Chak Kalan village, Jalandhar Rural police district, and moved to Canada on a study visa.) RCMP Assistant Commissioner David Teboul said: "There are separate and distinct investigations ongoing into these matters, certainly not limited to the involvement of the people arrested today, and these efforts include investigating connections to the Government of India."

=== Criminal investigation in United States ===
On 7 July 2026, the US Department of Justice announced that they had filed charges against Lawrence Bishnoi and Satinderjeet Singh, also known as Goldy Brar, for their responsibility in the murder of Nijjar. Both are prominent members of the Bishnoi Gang, which has been designated a terrorist entity by Canada since 2025. The FBI also put a $50,000 bounty on Brar for his arrest. The charges were announced by first assistant attorney for California Bill Essayli.

According to the unsealed indictment Bishnoi used smuggled cell phones from prison to direct four individuals to carry out the killing, providing one of them with Nijjar's photograph and home and work addresses. Two masked assailants shot Nijjar as he was leaving the parking lot of his temple. The four individuals named in the indictment were not publicly identified. The U.S. Department of Justice stated it intended to seek Bishnoi's extradition from India.

=== Allegation of Indian responsibility ===
In September 2023, during the G20 New Delhi summit, Canada and India did not have a one-on-one meeting, but instead met on the sidelines. Indian prime minister Narendra Modi raised concerns with Canadian prime minister Justin Trudeau about extremist elements in Canada who were involved in threats and violence towards Indian diplomats and the Indian community, while Trudeau brought up the accusations of Indian government involvement in the killing of Hardeep Singh Nijjar. The talks between the two leaders were tense, affecting ongoing trade discussions.

On 18 September 2023, Canadian prime minister Justin Trudeau said in Parliament, "Over the past number of weeks, Canadian security agencies have been actively pursuing credible allegations of a potential link between agents of the government of India" and Nijjar's killing. Trudeau called upon the Indian government to cooperate with the investigation, and said: "Any involvement of a foreign government in the killing of a Canadian citizen on Canadian soil is an unacceptable violation of our sovereignty." Before a Cabinet meeting the next day, Trudeau said: "We are not looking to provoke or escalate. We are simply laying out the facts as we understand them."

The Canadian government has not made public any evidence linking the Indian government to the killing, citing the need to protect sensitive intelligence sources and methods. Canadian government sources with knowledge of the matter told the CBC that human and signals intelligence provided evidence of the Indian government's responsibility, including messages between Indian officials and intelligence from an unnamed Five Eyes alliance member. The U.S. Ambassador to Canada later confirmed that Canada had received intelligence shared from Five Eyes regarding the murder prior to the public allegations. Canada has however denied having evidence of prime minister Modi, foreign minister S. Jaishankar or the National Security Advisor Ajit Doval being involved in the attack.

The Canadian investigations are ongoing, including into possible connections between the killing and the Indian government. In October 2024, Canada expelled six Indian diplomats, including the high commissioner Sanjay Kumar Verma, as persona non grata. This occurred after Canada said they provided India with "irrefutable evidence" of links between Indian government agents and the murders of both Nijjar and of Sukhdool Singh, who was shot in Winnipeg on 20 September 2023; Canadian officials say that the six officials were "directly involved in gathering detailed intelligence on Sikh separatists who were then killed, attacked or threatened by India's criminal proxies". India responded by calling the claims "preposterous" and expelling six Canadian diplomats in a tit-for-tat move.

In October 2024, Canadian officials said they had evidence of Indian government involvement in home invasions, drive-by shootings, arson and two homicides, those of Nijjar and Sukhdool Singh. Investigations had revealed that Indian diplomats intimidated and coerced Canadians, who were seeking immigration documents and/or had family ties in India, to gather intelligence for the Research and Analysis Wing to pick targets who were then attacked by a gang led by Lawrence Bishnoi. The RCMP had arrested several people in connection to homicides and extortion, some of whom were linked to the government of India, and had alerted twelve Canadian residents of Indian descent based on credible evidence that they could be targeted by Indian agents.

=== Diplomatic fallout ===
Nijjar's death caused a diplomatic crisis, with Canada–India relations falling to their lowest point. India rejected the allegations as "absurd" and "motivated". The investigation directly led to the suspension of talks on a Canada–India trade deal on 1 September. Canadian foreign minister Mélanie Joly ordered the expulsion of Pavan Kumar Rai, a top Indian diplomat in Canada who headed the operations of the Research and Analysis Wing, India's external intelligence agency, in Canada. In response, India expelled Olivier Sylvestre, the chief of the Canadian intelligence office in India, the next day.

The Indian government also accused Canada of harbouring "extremists and terrorists" who "continue to threaten India's sovereignty and territorial integrity". On 21 September, India's foreign ministry spokesperson Arindam Bagchi branded Canada as a "safe haven for terrorists, for extremists, and for organized crime." Politicians from both the ruling Bharatiya Janata Party and the opposition, as well as news anchors, commentators and former ambassadors, accused Trudeau of making the allegations for political gain.

India issued a travel warning on 20 September 2023, urging Indian citizens to "exercise utmost caution" when travelling to Canada due to "growing anti-India activities and politically condoned hate-crimes"; Canadian Minister of Public Safety Dominic LeBlanc dismissed India's travel advisory, saying: "People can read into that what they want. Canada is a safe country. What we're doing is ensuring there's an appropriate criminal investigation into these circumstances." India temporarily suspended the processing of visa applications for Canadian citizens on 21 September 2023 due to the "rift" between the countries; the Indian government blamed "security threats being faced by our High Commission and consulates in Canada" as the reason for the suspension. There is no restriction on citizens holding valid visas.

On 30 September 2023, the Indian foreign minister S. Jaishankar said that India has had an ongoing problem with Canada for years, due to what he said was Canada's "permissiveness in regard to terrorism, extremism and violence in the country", and that "our diplomatic personnel have been consistently and continuously intimidated in Canada". In October, India ordered Canada to remove 41 of its diplomats from its embassy in Delhi.

In June 2024, Modi and Trudeau met briefly at the G7 summit in Italy, signalling that the diplomatic outcry over Nijjar's assassination may be receding. PM Trudeau further stated that there was a commitment to collaborate with India on some important issues. Under the Premiership of Mark Carney, ties between Canada and India eased, with the two nations restoring diplomatic ties in 2025.

=== Reactions ===
==== Indian Canadians ====
Nijjar's killing intensified pre-existing splits among Indo-Canadians. Just over half of Canadians of Indian heritage are Sikh, while many others are Hindu. In the two years before Nijjar's killing, there had been sporadic clashes at demonstrations in Canada between Sikhs who support Khalistan and Hindus.

After Nijjar's killing, Gurpatwant Singh Pannun, general counsel for the Khalistan movement-aligned Sikhs for Justice group, called Indian Hindus in Canada to "go back to India" and accused them of "working against" Canada. The video, which was later deleted, was condemned by Canadian officials, including Canadian public safety minister Dominic LeBlanc, Public Safety Canada, NDP leader Jagmeet Singh, and Conservative leader Pierre Poilievre; LeBlanc wrote that the "circulation of an online hate video targeting Hindu Canadians runs contrary to the values we hold dear as Canadians" and condemned "acts of aggression, hate, intimidation or incitement of fear."

==== Five Eyes ====
Canada's Five Eyes allies, namely the United States, the United Kingdom, Australia, and New Zealand, expressed their concern and encouraged India to collaborate with Canada's investigation into the killing, but have not publicly condemned India for its alleged involvement. The United States, United Kingdom, Canada, Australia and New Zealand privately raised the issue with Indian prime minister Modi in meetings at the 2023 G20 summit. U.S. National Security Adviser Jake Sullivan said: "I firmly reject the idea that there is a wedge between the United States and Canada. We have deep concerns about the allegations and we would like to see this investigation carried forward and the perpetrators held to account." He added that the United States would defend its basic principles "regardless of the country" and that the United States had been in touch with both India and Canada regarding the murder.

On 22 September, American Secretary of State Antony Blinken said that the United States was "deeply concerned" about the allegations and was coordinating with Canadian authorities as they continued to investigate Nijjar's death. Blinken said: "We are extremely vigilant about any instances of alleged transnational repression—it's something we take very, very seriously." On 30 September, Blinken urged India's external affairs minister S. Jaishankar to cooperate with Canada's investigation.

In the days after Nijjar's murder, the FBI warned at least three American Sikh activists that their lives were in danger under the "duty to warn" doctrine, which requires American law enforcement to warn citizens of certain threats to their safety.

In November 2023, U.S. authorities claimed to have thwarted a plot by the Indian government to assassinate the US-based Sikh separatist Gurpatwant Singh Pannun. An Indian government employee had an indictment filed against them in New York for their alleged role in the plot, which alleges that the Indian government employee told an undercover DEA agent that Pannun and Nijjar were "both on the same list of targets".

In March 2024, New Zealand Foreign Minister Winston Peters made remarks during an interview with the Indian media outlet The Indian Express that appeared to cast doubt on Five Eyes intelligence material from Canada arguing that the Indian Government was responsible for assassinating Nijjar. In response, a New Zealand Foreign Affairs spokesperson issued a statement clarifying that New Zealand was not questioning Canada's claim against India and that Peters was stating that the matter "is an ongoing investigation that needs to run its course before clear conclusions can be drawn." During a meeting with Canadian High Commissioner to India Cameron MacKay, Peters clarified that New Zealand's position on Hardeep Singh remained unchanged and that he was not questioning Canada's claim.

==== Bangladesh ====
Bangladeshi foreign minister AK Abdul Momen expressed grievances against Canada's extradition policies over the treatment of S. H. M. B. Noor Chowdhury, describing Canada as a "hub for murderers".

==== Pakistan ====
Pakistan's foreign office said that India's "network of extra-territorial killings" has gone global, which is "a clear violation of international law and the UN principle of state sovereignty."

==== Sri Lanka ====
Sri Lanka's foreign minister, Ali Sabry, accused Canada of being a "safe haven for terrorists", in reference to the Liberation Tigers of Tamil Eelam, and suggested Prime Minister Justin Trudeau was prone to making "outrageous allegations without any supporting proof", citing Trudeau's claim that Sri Lanka committed genocide during the Sri Lankan Civil War.
