= Arpita =

Arpita is an Indian given name and the female form of Arpit. According to the Penguin Book of Indian Names, it means "offered" or "fixed upon; delivered; entrusted; given back; surrendered". Notable people with the name include:

- Arpita Chakraborty, Indian singer
- Arpita Ghosh (born 1966), Indian theatre artist and politician
- Arpita Pal, Indian film actress
- Arpita Singh (born 1937), Indian artist
