= Goldy Brar =

Canadian-Indian gangster (born 1994)

FBI Ten Most Wanted Fugitive

Description
- Born: Satinderjeet Singh; 11 March 1994 (age 32); Sri Muktsar Sahib, Punjab, India
- Nationality: Indian
- Height: 5 ft 8" (172 cm)
- Occupation: Gangster, Drug Dealer, Smuggler, Extortionist, Racketeer

Status
- Added: September 28, 2026
- Number: 543
- Currently a Top Ten Fugitive

Satinderjeet Singh (born 11 March 1994), also known as Goldy Brar, is a Canada-based Indian notorious gangster, drug trafficker, racketeer and a top wanted fugitive. He is currently wanted by Indian authorities in connection for the Assassination of Sidhu Moosewala in 2022, with other charges of murder, attempted murder, kidnapping, smuggling, extortions, racketeering and drug trafficking. He is a close ally of Lawrence Bishnoi, a notorious Indian Punjabi-origin gang leader and major drug trafficker, who is currently incarcerated in Sabarmati Central Jail. Canada's BOLO program named Brar among its top 25 most wanted fugitives. A report of India's National Investigation Agency (NIA) claims that the Bishnoi gang and Brar are linked to Pro-Khalistan outfits.

== Early life ==
Satinderjeet Singh was born on 11 March 1994, in the Sri Muktsar Sahib district of Punjab. His father, Shamsher Singh, worked for the Punjab Police as an assistant sub-inspector. He later moved to Faridkot, Burj Hari Ke village in Punjab.

He studied in Panjab University, where he met Lawrence Bishnoi and eventually became his right handman, began involvement in intimidating rivals, assaulting & beating other students and maintaining his gang domination over the University and its affiliated-College's resources.

Brar allegedly obtained a Canadian student visa and escaped to Canada in 2017.

== Criminal career ==
Brar is a top-ranking member of the Lawrence Bishnoi gang, one of the most notoriously powerful criminal gangs in Punjab. The gang is known for its involvement in a number of high-profile crimes, including the murder of several high-ranking police officials. Brar's involvement in the gang increased following the death of his cousin in 2020.

In May 2022, a Faridkot court issued a non-bailable arrest and warrant against Brar for killing District Youth Congress president Gurlal Singh Pehalwan. After that, on 29 May 2022, Brar allegedly killed famous Indian Punjabi singer, rapper and politician Sidhu Moose Wala in a brutal planned attack, which significantly made his name as a person of interest to the authorities, according to a Facebook post by Brar taking responsibility for the shooting.

The Indian government issued a Red Notice against him in June 2022, which means that he can be arrested and extradited from any country that is a member of Interpol. Brar is accused of conspiring with others to acquire and supply illegal firearms, and using those firearms to commit murder and attempt murder.

India's Ministry of Home Affairs designated Brar, the alleged mastermind behind the Assassination of Sidhu Moosewala, a designated terrorist under UAPA. The MHA cited his association with Babbar Khalsa International (a listed terrorist organisation), involvement in killings, cross-border activities, arms smuggling, and threatening calls. This move underscores Brar's perceived threat to national security.

Brar has been named among the top 25 most wanted fugitives by the BOLO, which has offered a reward of $50,000 for information leading to Brar's arrest. The FBI has also instituted a reward of $50,000 for Brar's arrest, for charges related to the murder of Canadian Sikh Khalistani separatist Hardeep Singh Nijjar. On 28 September, 2026 the FBI added Brar to its list of ten most wanted fugitives and offered a reward of up to $1 million for information leading to his arrest.

== Reports of Brar's death ==
Brar is currently on the run from Indian and Canadian authorities. He was rumoured to have been shot and killed in Fresno, California on 30 April 2024. While his death was reported in Indian media, it was not confirmed by U.S. authorities. Later on, the Indian media reported that news of his death was incorrect and that the dead man misidentified as Brar was actually Xavier Gladney. The lieutenant of the Fresno Police Department made it clear that the person shot dead was not Brar and quoting the media reports to be "untrue". They are unaware of who started this misinformation on social media and news media in India, without any verification.
