= Sikhs for Justice =

US-based Sikh separatist group

- Abbreviation: SFJ
- Formation: October 2007; 19 years ago
- Founder: Gurpatwant Singh Pannun
- Founded at: United States
- Type: NGO
- Legal status: Banned in India
- Purpose: Secession of Punjab from India as Khalistan
- Headquarters: New York, United States
- Official languages: Punjabi, English
- Legal advisor: Gurpatwant Singh Pannun
- International policy director: Jatinder Singh Grewal
- Website: sikhsforjustice.org

Sikhs for Justice (SFJ) is a U.S.-based secessionist group advocating for the creation of Khalistan. Founded in 2007 by lawyer Gurpatwant Singh Pannun, the organization emerged in response to the lack of legal action to convict those responsible for the killings and massacres of Sikhs following the assassination of Prime Minister Indira Gandhi by her Sikh bodyguards in 1984.

Sikhs for Justice was banned in India in 2019 as an unlawful association. In October 2021, it held an unsanctioned referendum for the creation of Khalistan.

== History ==
=== Legal proceedings against visiting Indian political leaders ===
In 2011, Sikhs for Justice filed a lawsuit in a U.S. court against Kamal Nath and several other leaders of the Indian National Congress for their alleged role in the 1984 anti-Sikh riots. However, the court dismissed the case, stating that it did not sufficiently "touch and concern" the U.S. In September 2013, the group filed an amended class-action complaint against Sonia Gandhi, accusing her of protecting party members involved in the 1984 anti-Sikh riots. This case was also dismissed in June 2014 due to a lack of subject matter jurisdiction and failure to state a claim. SFJ had intended to subpoena Rahul Gandhi after he acknowledged that "some Congressmen were probably involved" in the 1984 anti-Sikh riots and claimed they had been punished for it.

In February 2014, the group filed a human rights violation case against the 13th Prime Minister of India, Dr. Manmohan Singh (himself a Sikh), for his role as Finance Minister in the 1990s, accusing him of "funding crimes against humanity perpetrated upon the Sikh community in India." They also submitted a report on the 1984 anti-Sikh riots to the United Nations Commission on Human Rights.

=== Khalistan referendum campaign ===
SFJ launched the Referendum 2020 campaign, calling for a vote on whether Punjab should secede from India. The first phase of this unofficial and non-binding referendum began in London on 31 October 2021. In November 2018, Gurpatwant Singh Pannun announced that SFJ would establish a permanent office in Lahore to facilitate voter registration and provide information to Sikhs about the referendum. He also mentioned that banners related to the referendum and images of militant Jarnail Singh Bhindranwale had been displayed around Nankana Sahib. The group has occasionally expressed support for a greater Khalistan, with its headquarters in Pakistan's Punjab province, and has invited non-Sikhs to register to vote.

Sukhpal Singh Khaira, MLA of the Punjab Legislative Assembly and Leader of the Opposition at the time, stated that "Sikh Referendum 2020 was a result of the consistent policy of bias, discrimination, and persecution towards Sikhs by successive governments in India," though he clarified that he did not support the referendum. Punjab Chief Minister Amarinder Singh rebuked him, and both the Shiromani Akali Dal and the Bhartiya Janata Party criticized Khaira for his statement. Former Punjab Deputy Chief Minister Sukhbir Singh Badal called on AAP leader Arvind Kejriwal to take action against Khaira, then the Punjab Leader of the Opposition. In contrast, a Sikh delegation in the United States met with Indian Prime Minister Narendra Modi during his September 2019 visit to express their support for a united India.

On 31 October 2021, SFJ held the first round of its referendum in London for Sikhs of Indian ethnicity aged 18 and above, announcing plans to expand voting to other cities in the United Kingdom. However, only 2,000 people were reported to have participated. Less than 150 people voted in the first half despite 53 buses being deployed across the UK. There was no verification of voter identity, and reports indicated the same individuals voted multiple times, raising questions about the legitimacy of the exercise. In Switzerland, the referendum took place in Geneva on 10 December 2021, with over 6,000 Sikhs reported to have taken part. In 2022, SFJ held a referendum in Italy, with the first phase in Brescia in May and the second phase in Rome in July. Over 57,000 Sikhs were reported to have participated.

On 10 June 2022, the group released a proposed map of Khalistan at a press conference in Lahore. In addition to Indian Punjab, the map included Haryana, Himachal Pradesh, and parts of Rajasthan, Uttar Pradesh, and Uttarakhand. Gurpatwant Singh Pannun stated that Shimla would be the capital of the proposed nation and requested assistance from the Government of Pakistan in its creation.

The referendum in Canada began on 19 September 2022, with the first phase held in Brampton. The second phase took place in Mississauga in November. Approximately 185,000 Sikhs were reported to have participated in both phases.

In Australia, the referendum was held in Canberra on 29 January 2023, leading to clashes between pro-Khalistani and pro-Indian groups. On 10 September 2023, another round of the referendum took place in Surrey, British Columbia, followed by another on 29 October 2023 in Surrey.

On 28 January 2024, approximately 127,000 people participated in the referendum held at Civic Center Plaza in San Francisco, California. On 31 March 2024, the second phase of the referendum took place in Sacramento, California, where around 61,000 people participated.

On 17 November 2024, thousands attended a referendum in Auckland's Aotea Square. In early November 2024, Indian Minister of External Affairs S. Jaishankar had raised concerns with New Zealand Foreign Minister Winston Peters about the planned referendum in Auckland.

==== Kartarpur Corridor activism ====
The Kartarpur Corridor is a religious passageway, supported by the Indian and Pakistani governments, that allows Indian Sikhs to visit holy sites in Pakistan without requiring a visa. Members of Sikhs for Justice (SFJ) have used the corridor to promote Referendum 2020, urging pilgrims traveling across it to attend workshops and seminars on the Pakistani side. This, along with reports of alleged terrorist camps established in the region, has led to increased security surrounding the corridor.

=== 2023 video controversy ===
On 18 September 2023, Canadian Prime Minister Justin Trudeau announced that Canadian intelligence agencies were "pursuing credible allegations of a potential link" between Indian government agents and the assassination of Hardeep Singh Nijjar. Following this, a video began circulating on social media in which Gurpatwant Singh Pannun warned Indo-Canadian Hindus to leave Canada and "go to India," further alleging that they were disloyal to Canada. Numerous Canadian politicians, including federal party leaders Pierre Poilievre and Jagmeet Singh, as well as ministers in the federal cabinet, denounced the video. Canada's Public Safety Minister, Dominic LeBlanc, described it as "offensive and hateful."

== Criminal accusations ==
As of July 2019, Indian agencies, including the National Investigation Agency (NIA), Punjab Police, and Uttarakhand Police, were pursuing 12 criminal cases related to Sikhs for Justice (SFJ). These agencies had also arrested 39 individuals associated with the SFJ in India. According to former Chief Minister of Punjab Captain Amarinder Singh, SFJ "had unleashed a wave of terror in Punjab in recent years" and deserved to be classified as a terrorist organization.

A member of the group was arrested in Malaysia in September 2019, along with others, for allegedly planning to attack local party leaders. Additionally, a member of the Khalistan Zindabad Force, who was detained that same month for a bombing in Tarn Taran, claimed that the group had ordered him to kill dera leaders of local religious sects.

In 2020, Indian authorities investigated a network promoting Khalistan referendum where four people were associated with the SFJ. The Government of India later showed evidence that the group had planned targeted killings of leaders of Hindu organisations and others opposed to Khalistan movement.

SFJ activist Jaswinder Singh Multani was detained and questioned in Germany in December 2021 for his alleged role in the bombing of a court in Ludhiana. In January 2022, the National Investigation Agency (NIA) registered a case against him and announced a ₹1,000,000 reward for information leading to his capture. Following the attack, a purported audio message from Gurpatwant Singh Pannun claiming responsibility for the 2022 Mohali blast was released.

According to audio recordings of Gurpatwant Singh Pannun obtained by the Punjab Police from two SFJ members in July 2022, the group attempted to arrange shelter for the killers of singer Sidhu Moose Wala and planned to target Ambala Cantonment Junction railway station and Ambala City railway station, as well as disrupt Independence Day celebrations in Delhi and Punjab. Pannun has been booked in 22 cases in Punjab from 2017 to 2022. In October 2022, India requested Interpol to issue a red notice against him, but the request was rejected.

Purported audio from the group was released in December 2022, in which they claimed responsibility for the recent attack on a Tarn Taran police station. However, Pannun later stated that the organization only engaged in a peaceful struggle and would provide legal aid to the suspects, whom he claimed were falsely accused.

On 13 December 2023, the 22nd anniversary of the 2001 Indian Parliament attack, Gurpatwant Singh Pannun released a video threatening to attack the Parliament of India in response to alleged attempts on his life. The video also included a photo of Afzal Guru, the executed Islamist mastermind behind the 2001 attack.

In May 2024, the Lieutenant Governor of Delhi, V. K. Saxena, recommended a National Investigation Agency (NIA) probe against Delhi Chief Minister Arvind Kejriwal and his Aam Aadmi Party (AAP) government over allegations of receiving $16 million in funding from Sikh separatist groups. These allegations were based on a complaint referencing a video released by Gurpatwant Singh Pannun, in which he claimed that the AAP had received this funding from 2014 to 2022 in an attempt to facilitate the release of Devinder Pal Singh Bhullar and promote pro-Khalistan sentiments.

Rajya Sabha MP V. Sivadasan wrote a letter to Vice President and Chairman of the Rajya Sabha, Jagdeep Dhankhar, on 21 July 2024, alleging that he and another MP, A. A. Rahim, had received a call from the group, which threatened to bomb the area from the Parliament House to the Red Fort.

== Ban and blocks ==
Access to the group's Facebook page was blocked in India by Facebook in 2015.

Sikhs for Justice (SFJ) was banned for five years by the Government of India on 10 July 2019 under the Unlawful Activities (Prevention) Act (UAPA) for its alleged anti-India activities. An app created by SFJ for people to register for 'Referendum 2020' was reported and removed from the Google Play Store in November 2019. The ban was extended for an additional five years in July 2024.

In January 2020, the UAPA tribunal, chaired by Delhi High Court Chief Justice D.N. Patel, upheld the decision to ban the group. Citing the evidence presented, the tribunal stated that the activities of the group were "unlawful," "disruptive," and "threatening the sovereignty, unity, and territorial integrity of India." It concluded that SFJ was "working in collusion with anti-India entities and forces," and therefore, "[T]he Central Government had sufficient cause to take action under UAPA for declaring Sikhs for Justice as an unlawful association."

On 1 July 2020, Gurpatwant Singh Pannun was declared an "individual terrorist" under the UAPA for promoting secessionism and allegedly encouraging Punjabi Sikh youth to take up arms. On 5 July 2020, the central government, through an order from the Ministry of Electronics and Information Technology and on the recommendation of the Ministry of Home Affairs, banned 40 websites belonging to the group.
