= 2022 Mohali blast =

Terrorist attack in Mohali, India

The 2022 Mohali blast was a rocket-propelled grenade attack on the intelligence wing headquarters of the Punjab Police situated in Mohali, Punjab, India. The attack was committed on 10 May 2022.

== Background ==
=== Explosives found in Chandigarh ===
On 24 April 2022, Police found a bag containing explosives near the Chandigarh's Burail Jail. The bomb disposal squad of National Security Guard (NSG) was rushed in to defuse the bomb.

=== Khalistan Flags ===
On 9 May 2022, the main gate of the Himachal Pradesh Assembly complex were found to be tied with Khalistani flags. The walls of the complex were also scrawled with slogans. Later that evening, DGP Sanjay Kundu directed all senior police officers “to seal all inter-state borders and keep strict vigil at the places of probable hideouts” of the miscreants. The senior officials were also directed to keep the special security units, bomb disposal squads and quick reaction teams on high alert and “strengthen the security of dams, railway stations, bus stands, government buildings and vital installations”. He also cited the threat posed by the outlawed Sikhs for Justice announcing 6 June as voting date for Khalistan Referendum in Himachal Pradesh. Banned outfit Sikhs For Justice claimed the responsibility of raising the flags.

== Incident ==
The explosion was heard at 7:45 PM on the police building in the sector 77, Mohali.

As per the police briefing,

“A minor explosion was reported at the Punjab Police Intelligence Headquarters in sector 77, SAS Nagar at around 7.45 PM. No damage has been reported. Senior officers are on the spot and an investigation is being done. Forensic teams have been called.

Hours after the blast on intelligence department of Punjab police, another blast of low intensity was reported in Mohali.

== Aftermath ==
Pakistan was suspected of aiding the terrorists and multiple people were detained.

== Reactions ==
Indian National Congress told the chief minister of Punjab to set their priorities right.
