= Mukteshwar Mahadev Temple =

Shrine to Shiva in Punjab, India

- Pracheen Shiv Mandir
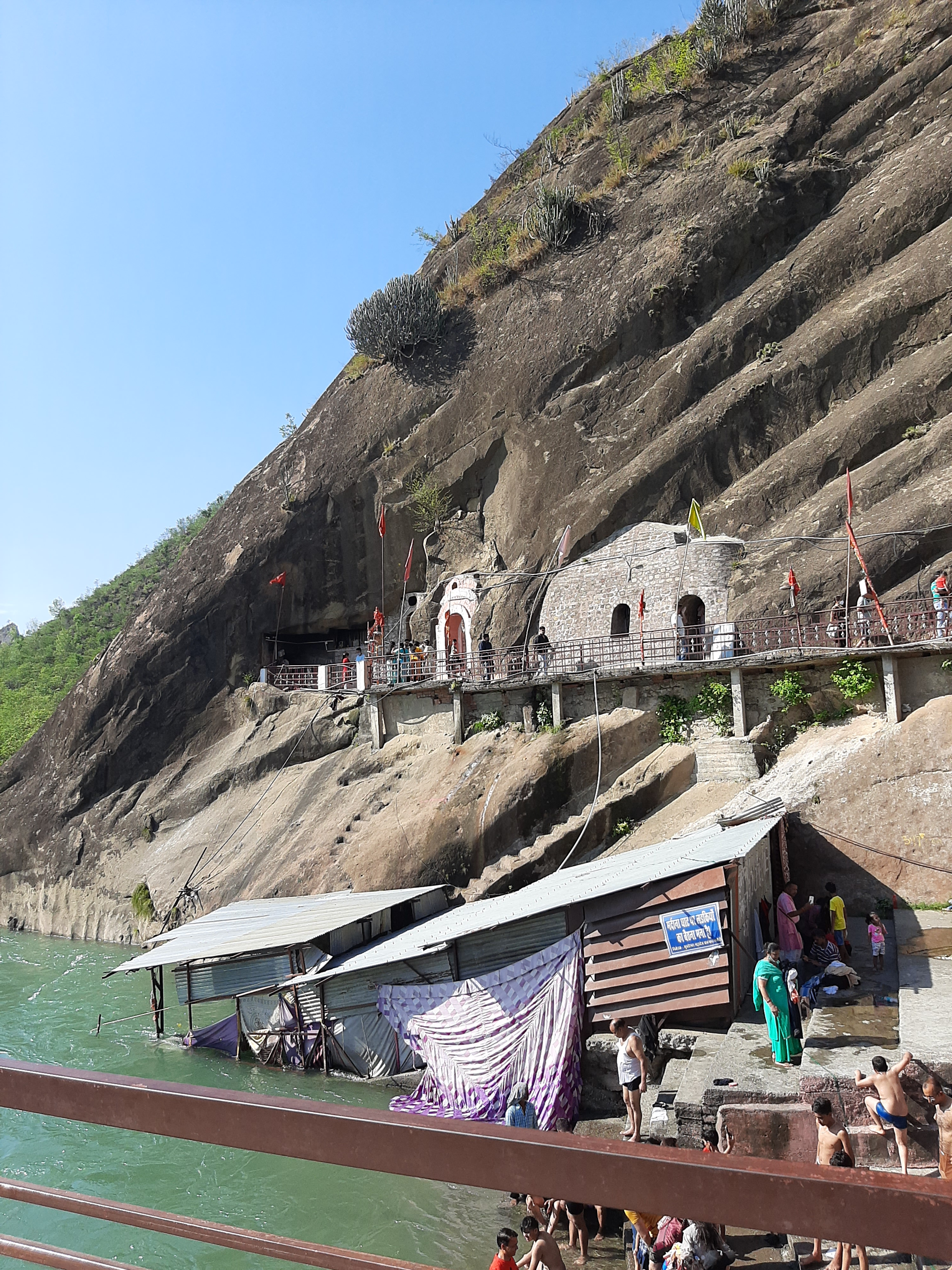

- Location in Punjab

Religion
- Affiliation: Hinduism
- District: Pathankot District

Location
- Location: Doong
- State: Punjab
- Country: India
- Interactive map of Mukteshwar Mahadev Temple
- Coordinates: 32.4251°N 75.7330°E

Website
- mukteshwarmahadev.com

Mukteshwar Mahadev Temple, also known as Mukesaran Mandir, is a shrine to Shiva and man-made cave complex located near Pathankot City, Punjab, India. on Shahpur Kandi Dam road. It is a Hindu temple containing representations of Ganesha, Brahma, Vishnu, Hanuman, and Parvati. It is considered to be one of the most sacred places around Pathankot. According to legend, the Pandavas stayed in the caves for a night during their exile (Agayatwas), and it is said that some of the caves date to the time of the Mahabharata.

== Location ==
The site is on the way to Shahpurkandi and is situated on the bank of the Ravi River, 22 km from Pathankot City. Situated on a hilltop, Mukteshwar Mahadev Temple contains a white marble Lingam and a copper Yoni. They are surrounded by the idols of Brahma, Vishnu, Parvati, Hanuman, and Ganesha.

== Etymology ==
There is a legend that the Lord Shiva slayed a demon here and granted him salvation (Mukti). In Sanskrit, the word Mukteshwar means "God of Relief or "Lord of Salvation", thus making this the "Temple of Salvation".

== Annual fair ==
A fair, called the Mukesran Da Mela, is held annually at this place in the month of April to mark the Baisakhi festival. Each year, a festival is held on the day of Maha Shivaratri, followed by two more celebrations, Chaitra Chaturdashi and Navaratri. Somvati Amavasya is another fair organized by the temple committee. Many pilgrims from Punjab and the nearby states of Himachal Pradesh and Jammu & Kashmir come here to worship.
