= Gurpatwant Singh Pannun =

American Sikh political activist and lawyer (born 1970s)

- Born: February 1967 (age 59); Khankot village, Amritsar, Punjab, India.
- Citizenship: United States
- Occupations: Political activist; lawyer
- Organization: Sikhs for Justice (SFJ)
- Known for: Promoting the Khalistan movement

Gurpatwant Singh Pannun (born February 1967) is an American Sikh political activist and lawyer. He is the leading figure of the Khalistan movement in the United States and is serving as the general counsel of the Sikhs for Justice (SFJ) since 2009.

Pannun has been designated as a terrorist by the Indian government since 2020 and was the subject of an assassination attempt in 2023, which is believed to be linked to India by the United States.

== Early life and background ==
Pannun was born in the c. 1970s in the Khankot village at the outskirts of Amritsar, Punjab, India. He studied at a local school in Ludhiana and then enrolled in the Panjab University, Chandigarh. He moved to the United States in 1992, later acquiring American citizenship. Pannun has also claimed to have Canadian citizenship, although this is unconfirmed.

== Activities ==
Pannun has campaigned for a separate Sikh state called Khalistan, organizing events and rallies around the world, including the United States, Canada, and the United Kingdom. He has said that the Modi government wants him dead and that Indian politicians have threatened him and other Sikh separatists in parliament. The Washington Post has described some of these potential threats as credible.

According to the BBC, Pannun has released hundreds of videos censuring India and offering monetary rewards to people who write anti-India graffiti or hoist Khalistan flags on government buildings, or desecrate the Indian flag. In September 2023, he was recorded calling for the "political death" of Prime Minister Modi and two of his ministers. Pannun has also claimed responsibility for posters which read "kill India" along with the names and pictures of Indian diplomats. He has denied that the posters incite violence against the diplomats.

In September 2023, a video surfaced in which Pannun warned Indo-Canadian Hindus to leave Canada, further accusing them of having "repudiated their allegiance to Canada". The video elicited condemnation from several Canadian politicians, including Federal party leaders, Pierre Poilievre and Jagmeet Singh. Canada's Public Safety Minister, Dominic LeBlanc, described the video as "offensive and hateful".

In November 2023, Pannun warned of danger to individuals planning to travel by Air India on 19 November (the date of the 2023 Cricket World Cup finals). Shortly after, Canada's Transport Minister, Pablo Rodriguez and the Royal Canadian Mounted Police (RCMP) announced an investigation into the incident. Spokesperson Kristin Kelly stated that the RCMP was collaborating with domestic and international partners and "industry stakeholders" in an investigation into "the threat against Air India flights." Pannun stated that his message was about boycotting, not bombing Air India.

== Legal issues ==
In 2020, Pannun was designated as a terrorist by the Government of India and his agricultural land was attached under Section 51A of the Unlawful Activities (Prevention) Act, though he rejected the charge. In October 2022, Interpol rejected India's second request to issue a Red Corner Notice on terror charges against Gurpatwant Singh Pannun, on the grounds of insufficient information. International criminal law and human rights lawyer Richard Rogers, who represents Pannun, has accused India of falsifying evidence through the Interpol red-notice system.

== Assassination attempt ==
In November 2023, the United States authorities stated that they had thwarted a plot to kill Pannun in the United States where a suspect approached an undercover DEA agent for contract killing of Pannun, and that federal prosecutors had filed a sealed indictment against a suspect in a New York district court. The US issued a diplomatic warning to India over concerns that the Government of India was involved in the plot and has later served India summons naming the NSA, Ajit Doval and RAW chief, Samant Goel, in October 2026. The report came two months after Canada accused Indian agents of being involved in the murder of Hardeep Singh Nijjar. A White House spokesperson confirmed the US had informed India about the incident sometime after the Indian prime minister Narendra Modi's visit to the US in June 2023. In June 2023, the Czech Republic arrested suspect Kumar Gupta at the request of the US following which he was extradited to the US in June 2024. In October 2024, a former Indian intelligence official, Vikash Yadak, was named as a handler for Gupta and charged by the US with the attempted murder of Pannun. In January 2025, India's Ministry of Home Affairs recommended legal action against an individual allegedly involved in the assassination plot. Gupta plead guilty for charges of assassination attempt and in November 2026, was sentenced to 235 months (19 years) in jail.

== See also ==
- Khalistan movement
- Hardeep Singh Nijjar
- 2023–25 Canada–India diplomatic row

== Sources ==
- Brar, Kamaldeep Singh (9 September 2020). "In Khankot village, few know of Pannu's ancestral roots". The Indian Express.
- Lucas, Ryan (27 October 2024). "Sikh separatist, targeted once for assassination, says India still trying to kill him". NPR.
- "An Exclusive Q&A With Gurpatwant Singh Pannun". TIME. 27 November 2023.
- Mollan, Cherylann; Yousif, Nadine (18 October 2024). "Gurpatwant Singh Pannu: US charges ex-India agent in Sikh separatist murder plot". BBC News.
- Pandey, Geeta (21 December 2023). "Gurpatwant Singh Pannun: The Sikh separatist at the centre of US murder plot allegation". BBC News.
- Mollan, Cherylann (20 December 2023). "Gurpatwant Singh Pannun: Narendra Modi breaks silence on US murder plot allegation". BBC News.
- Mercer, Greg (17 September 2024). "Indian intelligence officials targeted in New York lawsuit for alleged role in assassination plots". The Globe and Mail.
- Doherty, Will (13 October 2022). "Interpol Denies India's Request". Grossman Young & Hammond.
- "Transport minister, RCMP say Canada is investigating 'threats' against Air India". CBC. 10 November 2023.
- Yousif, Nadine (22 September 2023). "Incendiary rhetoric on Sikh's murder stokes debate in Canada diaspora".
- Patel, Shivam (21 November 2023a). "India's anti-terror agency files case against Sikh separatist for Air India threat". Reuters. Archived from the original on 2 December 2023.
- "Government of India Gazette on Individual Terrorists under UAPA" (PDF).
- Mason, Jeff; Patel, Shivam (22 November 2023). "US thwarted plot to kill Sikh separatist in America". Reuters.
- Patel, Shivam (23 November 2023b). "FACTBOX Who is Gurpatwant Pannun, target of foiled murder plot in US?". Reuters.
- Miller, Greg (29 April 2024). "An assassination plot on American soil reveals a darker side of Modi's India". The Washington Post.
- "Officials, politicians denounce 'hateful' video telling Indian Hindus to leave Canada". CBC.
- Sevastopulo, Demetri (22 November 2023). "US thwarted plot to kill Sikh separatist on American soil". Financial Times.
- Ellis-Petersen, Hannah (17 October 2024). "US charges former Indian spy allegedly linked to foiled murder plot". The Guardian. ISSN 0261-3077.
- Shamim, Sarah (18 October 2024). "Who is Vikash Yadav, Indian agent accused by US in Sikh assassination plot?". Al Jazeera.
- Lahiri, Tripti (16 January 2025). "India Edges Closer to Acknowledging Role in Plot to Kill American". The Wall Street Journal.
