= Sabarmati Central Jail =

Main prison of Ahmedabad, Gujarat, India

- Location in Ahmedabad, Gujarat, India Sabarmati Central Jail (Gujarat) Sabarmati Central Jail (India)
- Location: Sabarmati, Ahmedabad, Gujarat, India; 23.074885°N 72.584114°E
- Status: Operating
- Security class: Maximum
- Capacity: 530
- Opened: 1895
- Managed by: Department of Gujarat Prisons, Government of Gujarat

Sabarmati Central Jail is the main prison in Ahmedabad in Gujarat. It was established in 1895. Mahatma Gandhi was imprisoned there for a few days in 1922.

The prison is the hub of various activities for Reformation, Rehabilitation and Reintegration of Prisoners. Educational Institutes like IGNOU and BAOU are giving all correspondence courses to prisoners. Spiritual Organizations of the Country like Patanjali Yogapeeth, Art Of Living, Ramkrishna Mission, ISKCON, Chinmay Mission, All World Gayatri Pariwar, Arya Samaj, Swadhyay Parivar, Isha Yoga Foundation, Brhmakumari, Bharat Sevashram Sangh, Shrimad Rajchandra Mission etc. are giving lectures, seminars, workshops and diving training.

Sanskrit Revival in Ahmedabad Central Prison, Gujarat, India : An Initiative Taken by Sri Prashant Gohil [DySP ( Prison), Gujarat Prisons & Member of Global Uniform Services Welfare Committee ] in 2015 by Organizing EASY SANSKRIT SPEAKING SEMINAR & Sanskrit Revival & Vedanta : The New Height of Indian Heritage in Indian Prisons at Prison Auditorium. Noted Participants like Recent Gujarat DGP Sri P P Pandey, IPS and Ex DIG Sri D G Vanzara, IPS under Consultancy of Sri Himanjay Paliwal, Organization Secretary, Sanskritbharati, Gujarat. Then Chief Minister and now Prime Minister Sri Narendra Modi Congratulates the Venture of Knowledge.
