= Khalistan Tiger Force =

Organisation for the Khalistan movement cause

- Logo of the Khalistan Tiger Force
- Founder: Jagtar Singh Tara
- Dates active: 1990s – present
- Active regions: Punjab, India
- Status: Active
- Part of: Khalistan Movement

The Khalistan Tiger Force (KTF) is a pro-Khalistan militant organization. In February 2023, it was designated as a terrorist organization by the Government of India.

In May 2023, India's National Investigation Agency (NIA) arrested two wanted persons at Delhi’s Indira Gandhi International Airport, who allegedly were close aides of KTF's Arshdeep Singh, an "individual designated terrorist" based in Canada. In June 2023, NIA arrested Gagandeep Singh who allegedly is a close-aide of KTF operatives. Gagandeep Singh was also arrested previously in July 2021.

The Indian government alleged that Hardeep Singh Nijjar was the leader of the outfit.

== Origin and leaders ==
Khalistan Tiger Force was formed by Jagtar Singh Tara, a former Babbar Khalsa International, another military organization. The KTF has been alleged to be backed by Pakistan’s Inter-Services Intelligence by The Indian Express. Tara is currently serving a life sentence in India for his involvement in the assassination of former Punjab Chief Minister Beant Singh in 1995. Tara had escaped from jail in 2004, but was rearrested in Thailand in 2015 and brought to India.

=== Hardeep Singh Nijjar ===
According to the Indian government, Hardeep Singh Nijjar was the leader of Khalistan Tiger Force, and he was actively involved in the training and financing of militants for the organization. Nijjar allegedly visited Pakistan in 2013-14 to meet with Jagtar Singh Tara. Nijjar was also friendly with Dal Khalsa leader Gajinder Singh, one of the five hijackers of an Indian Airlines Flight 423 in 1981, who is allegedly in Pakistan. Nijjar's name was also on the list of wanted people that former Punjab Chief Minister, Captain Amarinder Singh handed over to Prime Minister Trudeau during the latter’s visit to India in 2018. Nijjar, 45, was shot dead outside a Sikh temple on 18 June 2023 in Surrey, a city in Metro Vancouver with a large Sikh population, three years after India had designated him as a terrorist.

== Activities ==
In November 2011, KTF claimed ownership of abandoned explosives recovered from a car outside Ambala railway station, purported for an attempt to assassinate an Indian politician in retribution for his involvement in the 1984 Sikh massacre.

On 12 April 2023, four Indian Army soldiers were killed in Bathinda; KTF claimed responsibility, although the police denied their involvement.

== Ban ==
In February 2023, the Indian Government banned KTF on the grounds of it being a militant outfit that aims at reviving terrorism in Punjab and challenges the territorial integrity, unity, national security and sovereignty of India and promotes various acts of terrorism, including targeted killings in Punjab.
