= Jasbir Singh Raina =

Ashoka Chakra recipient

Colonel Jasbir Singh Raina AC
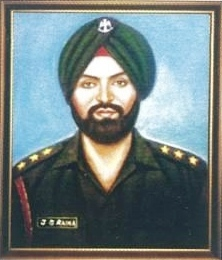
- Portrait of Captain (later Colonel) Jasbir Singh Raina
- Born: 5 July 1955 (age 71); Shimla, Himachal Pradesh, India
- Alma mater: Govt College, Shimla (BSc.); Officers Training Academy
- Military career
- Allegiance: India
- Branch: Indian Army
- Service years: 1977-2000
- Rank: Colonel
- Service number: SS-28930X (short-service commission); IC-37068Y (permanent commission)
- Unit: 10 Brigade of the Guards
- Conflicts: Operation Blue Star
- Awards: Ashoka Chakra

Colonel Jasbir Singh Raina, AC (5 July 1955) is a retired Indian Army officer who was awarded India's highest peacetime gallantry award Ashoka Chakra for his gallant act in Operation Blue Star.

== Early life ==
Raina was born on 5 July 1955 in Shimla in a Kashmiri Sikh family, the second among five brothers. His father Gyani Kartar Singh Raina, had migrate from present-day Pakistan due to the Partition of India, settled down in Shimla. A devout and upright man, he inculcated in his children the virtues of a principled way of life. Raina had his early education in the Sir Harcourt Butler School, Shimla and later passed out from the Central School, Shimla. He graduated from the Govt College, Shimla with a B Sc degree.

== Military career ==
Raina was always keen to join the Army and worked towards this goal assiduously. On 3 September 1977, he received a short-service commission as a second lieutenant in the 10th Battalion, Brigade of the Guards, and was promoted lieutenant on 3 September 1979. On 3 September 1982, he transferred to a permanent commission as a second lieutenant (seniority from 1 May 1978, seniority for pay from 3 September 1977) and was promoted to lieutenant with effect from the same date (seniority from 1 May 1980). He played all games for the battalion and reached the Command level in cross country, athletics and hockey. He was promoted to captain on 1 May 1984, and later that year, his battalion moved to Amritsar for taking part in Operation Blue Star.

Lieutenant General Kuldip Singh Brar had asked whomever had strong feelings to the attack on the Golden Temple should stand up- Raina stood up and said that he had strong feelings against Bhindranwale and hence was tasked with handing the first wave.

== Operation Blue Star ==
On 3 June 1984 during Operation Blue Star. IC- 37068, Captain Jasbir Singh Raina of 10 Guards was assigned the task of finding out details of the fortifications made by the militants in a building complex. Even though it was a dangerous mission, Captain Raina undertook the task and went inside in civilian clothes. In spite of the fact that he was being trailed by the militants throughout this mission, Capt Raina carried out the task at great risk to his own life and brought very useful information about the layout of the building as well as the fortifications inside it, Again on the night of the 5/6 June 1984, B' Company under command of Capt Jasbir Singh Raina was asked to flush out militants from the Golden Temple. His company was the first to enter the complex and he was in the lead.

His company's objective consisted of three storeyed buildings dominated from top, some underground tunnels and basements. As soon as the leading platoon entered the complex through the main entrance, it came under heavy fire of Light Machine Guns and other weapons from all sides of the complex. He was injured in the first burst of fire. Captain Raina was hit on his knees by a burst of fire from point blank range and was seriously wounded. The officer even at this stage had to be evacuated.

== Ashoka Chakra awardee ==
For his actions he was awarded Ashoka Chakra.

== Later career ==
Raina was promoted major on 1 May 1989. He retired a full colonel on 3 April 2000.

Captain Raina lived an extremely private life after the operation, privately disclosed to Kanwar Sandhu He stated was caught between his duty as a proud soldier of the Indian army, and his religion, as a proud Sikh. He believes that he chose his duty and felt blessed.
