= Shiksha (disambiguation) =

Shiksha (Sanskrit: शिक्षा IAST: śikṣā) is a Vedic concept based on the Sanskrit word, which means "instruction, lesson, learning, study of skill"

Shiksha may also refer to:

- Shiksha (NGO), Indian educational organization
- Shiksha (film), a 1970 film
- Shiksha - TeleVehicle, an Indian Bengali language satellite channel
- .shiksha, a top-level domain.

== See also ==
- , where the term refers to learning, study, etc.
- Shiksa, term for non-Jewish girls
- Shikshashtakam, Hindu prayer
