= Operation Woodrose =

1984 Indian military operation in Punjab

- Part of the Khalistan movement & Insurgency in Punjab
- State of Punjab shown in red
Date	8 June – September 1984 (>3 months)
Location	Punjab, India
Result	Intensification of the insurgency: Intended to preempt an uprising, the operation "proved to be even more counter-productive" than Blue Star, creating further "considerable alienation among a broad cross-section" of the Sikh population.

Casualties and losses
- More than 8,000 Sikh civilians reported killed or missing after more than 100,000 youth taken into custody; true number of casualties unknown

Operation Woodrose was a military operation carried out by the Indira Gandhi-led Indian government in the months after Operation Blue Star to "prevent the outbreak of widespread public protest" in the state of Punjab. The government arrested all prominent members of the largest Sikh political party, the Akali Dal, and banned the All India Sikh Students Federation, a large students' union. In addition, the Indian Army conducted operations in the countryside during which thousands of Sikhs, overwhelmingly young men, were detained for interrogation and subsequently tortured. Sparking significant recruitment of survivors into militancy in its aftermath, the operation was criticized by human-rights groups for the suspension of civil liberties and habeas corpus, resulting in the disappearances of thousands of Sikh men. After the operation, the central government was criticized for using "draconian legislation" to repress a minority community.

== Conduct of the operation ==
The operation consisted of the rounding up of thousands of Sikh youth and civilians. Troops would lay siege to targeted villages in the early-morning hours, confining the inhabitants to their houses and stopping all movement out of the village while conducting house-to house raids. Some villages experienced repeated sieges. Sikh homes were raided indiscriminately, with an overwhelming number of detained being innocents. Techniques included cordon operations, mass arrests, torture, sexual harassment and assaults, and disappearances.

According to various estimates, approximately 5,000–8,000 individuals were reported as missing or killed by October 1984 as a result of Army operations during Woodrose alone (not including Operation Blue Star where over 5,000 civilians were killed) by state media, though Punjabi-language media estimated much higher figures. According to Dr. Sangat Singh, who served in the Joint Intelligence Committee of the Government of India in the 1970s, about 100,000 youth had been taken into custody within the first four to six weeks of the operation, with many not heard from again, and many taken into custody, beaten, and tortured.

The operation was mainly concentrated in the border districts, and all amritdhari, or initiated, Sikh men from ages 15 to 60, particularly between 15 and 35, were referred to as "potential" terrorists in Army communiqués and targeted and taken from border villages. Kesari (saffron) turbans and dupattas had become common among younger Sikh men and women after Blue Star in cities, villages, colleges, schools. As in Operation Blue Star, Sikhs with kesari-colored turbans were summarily shot.

=== Youth ===
Since the most likely targets were youth, many would try to flee across the border to Pakistan as the army approached, with many swimming across the Ravi River at night. After meeting with key members of Sikh militant groups through a network of gurdwaras, those with military experience were separated from the others and sent elsewhere from government resthouses, they would be housed in Faisalabad and Kot Lakhpat jails and interrogated by Pakistani intelligence. At first, Pakistani authorities jailed them as trespassers, before realizing their potential use, exploiting their resentment and distress to return a number of them as armed, motivated militants. From these detainees, members of Sikh militant groups would recruit from them after regular visits and questionings. As the remainder, after being detained for as long as 19 months, after hunger strikes, attempted jailbreaks, and demands that they be train to fight or released, they were usually given about two weeks of weapons training and a small sum of money, with promises of further arming and access to weapons markets. About 20,000 fleeing youth are estimated to have crossed the border.

=== Ex-servicemen ===
Extrajudicial abuse extended even to distinguished Sikh army veterans; as Sikh ex-servicemen formed a large proportion of the rural Sikh population at about half a million at any given time. Between the army's treatment of youth, veterans, and the old and infirm, rumors abounded in the countryside that the state was trying to wipe out the younger generation of a small minority and was systematically engaged in its suppression. An atmosphere of fear and suspicion continued in the countryside for several months. Even after the formal end of the operation in September 1984, the community remained at the mercy of the authoritarian state apparatus; its deep, long-lasting sense of distress and disgruntlement would later become a significant factor in precipitating the subsequent militancy.

Even after the operation, hundreds of men, women, and even children, picked up from the countryside, remained incarcerated.

== Punjab-Chandigarh Disturbed Area Act (1983) and other measures ==
To allow for the legality of the operation, the states of Punjab and Chandigarh had been declared by the Indian government as 'disturbed areas' by the enactment of the Punjab Chandigarh Disturbed Area Act 1983, while the Army was given unprecedented powers to detain and arrest civilians by the enactment of the Armed Forces (Punjab and Chandigarh) Act 1983. The act empowered any commissioned, warrant or non-commissioned officer of the Army if "of opinion that it is necessary so to do for the maintenance of public order, after giving such due warning as he may consider necessary, fire upon or otherwise use forces, even to the causing of death". The act also allowed such an officer to "arrest, without warrant, any person who has committed a cognizable offence or against whom a reasonable suspicion exists that he has committed or is about to commit a cognizable offence".

Fast Track courts were set up under the Terrorist Affected Areas (Special Courts) Act 1984 to try to sentence suspected terrorists rapidly.

The operation were overseen by Major General Jagdish Singh Jamwal, who was assigned the responsibility to seal the international border with Pakistan, in an attempt to control smuggling of arms and personnel, and by Lieutenant General Ranjit Singh Dyal, who was instructed to oversee the apprehension of militants in state of Punjab.

== Outcome ==
The Operation "proved to be a disaster," with police conduct increasing rural Sikh solidarity with the insurgents' cause. Punjab Chief of Police, Kanwar Pal Singh Gill described the actions as "suffering from all the classical defects of army intervention in civil strife" and stated that the Indian Army had acted "blindly". According to reporter Sanjeev Gaur in 1985, "The army arrested fewer terrorists and more innocent Sikhs during mopping up operations. The army indiscriminatingly raided Sikh homes in the villages, abused their family members and took into custody young people...Said a police officer, 'Sikhs in Punjab villages today hate the army. (It) really let loose a reign of terror'. Go to any Punjab village and they have those sad and tragic stories to narrate to you."

As the initial national patriotism backing the operation began to wane, both Operation Blue Star and Operation Woodrose began to receive negative coverage of their goals, conduct, nature, and timing, both domestically and abroad. The executive committee of the Punjab unit of the Indian Ex-Services League condemned the incidents of "harassment and humiliation" of ex-soldiers by the state's security forces.

The operations would create a long-lasting sense of bitterness that would become a "significant factor in precipitating" the insurgency in the state.

== See also ==
- Kharku
- Operation Black Thunder
