= 20 SATA Regiment (India) =

- Active: 1942 – present
- Country: India
- Allegiance: British India; India
- Branch: British Indian Army; Indian Army
- Type: Artillery
- Size: Regiment
- Nickname(s): Alma mater of Locators; The Originals
- Motto(s): Sarvatra, Izzat-O-Iqbal (Everywhere with Honour and Glory).
- Colors: "Red & Navy Blue"

Commanders
- Notable commanders: Col E. R. Culverwell, Maj Gen H. D. W. Sitwell, Maj Gen K. F. Mackay Lewis, Gen O. P. Malhotra, Lt Gen MM Lakhera

Insignia
- Abbreviation: 20 SATA Regt

20 SATA Regiment, nicknamed the Alma Mater of Locators and The Originals, is a Surveillance and Target Acquisition (SATA) artillery regiment, which is part of the Regiment of Artillery of the Indian Army.

== Formation ==
The Regiment was raised on August 4, 1924 at the School of Artillery in Kakul (now in Pakistan) as 1 Survey Section Royal Indian Artillery under Captain E. R. Culverwell. Upon establishment, it consisted of only nine personnel, which included two British officers, as well as several V.C.Os, Indian Officers and Other Ranks. These nine persons, later to be known as the ‘Nine Originals’, had passed a Royal Engineers survey course at Roorkee. They were selected from Mountain Artillery, Cavalry and Infantry Units to form the nucleus of Survey Section Royal Indian Artillery.

== History ==
1 Survey Battery
Captain Culverwell commanded the section for several years and was followed by Captains H. D. W. Sitwell, C. L. Ferard, K. F. Mackay Lewis, W. J. Gyde and R. MacCaig. 1 Survey Section was reorganised in 1941 as the ‘Survey Troop’ and carried out the survey of the Khyber Pass. In January 1942, it was re-designated as 1 Survey Battery under Major J. H. C. Hunter, and shortly afterwards re-joined the School of Artillery at Deolali.

1st Indian Survey Regiment
In August, 1942, the 1st Battery and a new Regimental Headquarters (R.H.Q.) were combined to form the 1st Indian Survey Regiment. The first Commanding Officer was Lieutenant-Colonel J. F. S. Rendall, with Major J. H. C. Hunter as Second-in -Command and Captain Matthews as Adjutant. Major S. A. Brighty commanded No. 1 Battery. In June, 1943, No. 2 Battery was formed under Major F. A. von Goldstein. A radar troop was raised in 1943 as part of the Regiment.

World War II
In July 1944, the Regiment moved by road to Ranchi and in August to the Imphal area to join the Burma campaign of World War II. It came under command of 33 Corps, which had begun the pursuit to the Chindwin River line in Burma. No. 2 Survey Battery under Major von Goldstein joined the 11th (East Africa) Division, which was pressing down the Kabaw Valley. The No. 1 Survey Battery under Major B. C. Slater joined the 2 British Division and moved south to take part in the corps artillery concentration covering the crossing of the Irrawaddy River. After the crossings the survey battery joined 20 Division. No. 2 Survey Battery joined 19 Indian Division for the northern crossings of the Irrawaddy. One Military Cross and three Military Medals were awarded to personnel from the regiment. Orders had been issued that units not urgently required were to return to India and on 13 May 1945, the 1st Indian Survey Regiment was flown to Comilla. Lieutenant-Colonel H. G. Croly was now in command and repatriation had begun, and many changes of all ranks were taking place. The regiment eventually moved to Hyderabad (Sind) under Lieutenant-Colonel von Goldstein as commanding officer.

Partition
On 25 January 1947, as a result of the Partition, the 1st Indian Survey Regiment became 20th Survey Regiment, R.I. A., under command of Lieutenant-Colonel Rajbahadur, having shed 2nd Survey Battery. This became the 2nd Survey Battery, R.P.A. (later 13th Survey Battery, R.P.A.).

Post independence
In July 1952, the Regiment was reorganised as the 20 Locating Regiment. In June 1987, the Regiment was redesignated as the 20 Surveillance and Target Acquisition (SATA) Regiment with the role of carrying out all weather surveillance of targets including enemy guns and mortars.

== Operations ==
Pre-independence

- World War - II (Burma Theatre) – 1944

Post independence

- Hyderabad Police Action – 1948 and Indo-Pakistani War of 1947–1948.
- Sino-Indian War in 1961-62 – The unit saw action in Sikkim and NEFA.
- Indo-Pakistani War of 1965 in the Western Sector. The unit took part in Operation Ablaze (1965) and Operation Riddle (September 1965 to February 1966).
- Indo-Pakistani War of 1971 - It was part of the 15th Infantry Division during the war in the Western Sector. It was part of the force tasked to defend the Amritsar and Dera Baba Nanak sectors. Commenting on the artillery support, Maj Gen Sukhwant Singh (Deputy Director Military Operations, Army Headquarters), writes in his book ‘India's Wars Since Independence: Defence of the western border’, “The Independent Artillery Brigade supported the operation with intimate, timely and abundant artillery fire. So effective was the brigade’s counter-battery programme that there was no interference by the enemy artillery, “The performance of the Flash Spotting Troop of 20 Locating Regiment in particular, had been commendable. It had started “fixing’ the Pakistani gun areas from Day One, when Pakistan attacked Kasowal. Thereafter, whenever and from wherever the enemy artillery opened up, the eyes and instruments of the flash spotters kept updating its latest locations, enabling effective counter bombardment. The four personnel from the regiment were Mentioned in Despatches.
- Operation Blue Star - 04 June 1984 to 17 September 1984).
- Operation Trident - 23 January 1987 to 14 February 1987
- Operation Rakshak – 15 November 1989 to 15 July 1991 in Jammu and Kashmir.
- Operation Rakshak - Counter terrorist operations in Punjab between 15 June 1992 and 13 August 1992.
- Operation Vijay - 24 May 1999 to 31 January 2000
- Operation Parakram - 19 December 2001 to 31 July 2003
- Operation Rakshak ll - 1 August 2004 to 07 June 2008
- Operation Snow Leopard - May 2020 to September 2020

== Awards and citations ==
- The regiment was awarded the Chief of Army Staff (COAS) Unit Citation during the Army Day Parade in 2021.
- World War II
  - Military Cross- Captain ER Culverwell, 1944
  - Military Medal - Captain Asserlie, Havildar Girdhara Singh, Havildar Abdullah Khan, Havildar Anwar Hussion (Military Medal) 1944
- Indo-Pakistani War of 1971
  - Mention-in-Despatches - Captain KS Battra, Havildar Bhim Singh, Havildar Shadi Lal, Lance Naik Mihan Singh, Havildar T Brahama
- GOC-in-C Commendation Cards
1. Subedar (TIFC) K M Khan (WC 1995)
2. Subedar (AIG) Baldev Singh (WC 1995)
3. Subedar Bane Singh (WC 1995)
4. Subedar (AIG) Prayag Singh (NC 1997)
5. Subedar (TIFC) Surjit Singh (NC 2000)
6. Subedar (TIFC) Jagjiwan Age (NC 2000)
7. Lance Naik Jia Lal (NC 2001)
8. Captain Y P Singh (NC 2001)
9. Subedar (AIG) William Masih (NC 2001)
10. Havildar B B Phukan (NC 2001)
11. Lance Havildar Anbazhagan P (NC 2006)
12. Captain SK Ojha (WC 2010)
13. Lance Naik Santosh Kumar B (WC 2010)
14. Havildar PK Rao (WC 2010)
15. Colonel (Now Brig) NR Pandey (WC 2012)
16. Naib Subedar SK Sahoo (WC 2012)
17. Colonel NR Pandey (EC 2015)
18. Lieutenant Colonel Subodh Chaudhary (EC 2015)
19. Havildar Ratheesh M VCOAS (CC 2019)
20. Major KS Kiran, SM (NC 2020)
21. Major Jadhav Ajinkya (SWC 2020)
22. Subedar (OPR) Suresh S (NC 2020)
23. Naib Subedar (RST) Ramesh Kumar (NC 2020)
24. Major Alex Sebastian (NC 2021)
25. Major Shagun Sharma (SWC 2022)
26. Subedar (OFC) SS Parmar (SWC 2022)
27. Naib Subedar (OpR) Sumanta Aich (SWC 2022)
28. Naib Subedar (AIG)Khajavali Shaik (SWC 2023)
29. Subedar (AIG) Eswara Rao Vempada (SWC 2023)
30. Havildar (RST) Durga Rama Rao (SWC 2023)
31. Havildar (RST) K Lakshmana Rao (SWC 2023)
32. Major KS Kiran, SM (SWC 2023)
33. Subedar Eswara Rao 2020 (SWC 2023)

== Achievements in sports ==
Personnel from the Regiment have excelled in sporting competitions and represented their formation at different levels. They include -

- Lance Havildar (DMT) Jadumani (Football), Command Level
- Gunner (DMT) Ankit Jadon (10 m Air Rifle), National Level
- Naik (OPR) Himashekhar (Boxing), Command Level
- Naib Subedar Santhosh B (Water polo), Command Level

== Other achievements ==
- The regiment had the honour to participate in the Republic Day Parade in 1993.

== See also ==
- List of artillery regiments of Indian Army
