= Kuldip Singh Brar =

Retired Indian general

Lieutenant General Kuldip Singh Brar PVSM, AVSM, VrC
- Born: 1934 (age 91–92); Dhanaula, Punjab, British India
- Education: The Doon School
- Military career
- Allegiance: India
- Branch: Indian Army
- Service years: 1954–1992
- Rank: Lieutenant General
- Nickname: Bulbul
- Service number: IC-6732
- Unit: Maratha Light Infantry
- Commands: Eastern Command
- Conflicts: Indo-Pakistani War of 1971; Operation Blue Star
- Awards: Param Vishisht Seva Medal; Ati Vishisht Seva Medal; Vir Chakra

Lieutenant General Kuldip Singh Brar, PVSM, AVSM, VrC (born 1934) is a retired Indian Army officer, who was involved in the Indo-Pakistani War of 1971. As a major general, he commanded Operation Blue Star.

== Early days ==
Brar was born in 1934 into a Sikh Jat family. His family has a long legacy with the armed forces, his grandfather was Captain Hira Singh, from whom Patto Hira Singh, Moga is named after, his father was Major General Digambhar Singh Brar (1898–1997). His brother also served in the army at Sri Lanka. He himself studied at the Doon School, an all-boys' boarding school.

== Military career ==
=== 1971 Indo-Pakistan war ===
Brar joined the Maratha Light Infantry in 1954 as a second lieutenant. During the Indo-Pakistani War of 1971, Brar commanded an infantry battalion and was in the first batch of troops who entered Dhaka (now the capital of Bangladesh) on the morning of 16 December 1971. He was awarded the Vir Chakra for the battle fought at Jamalpur on the night of 10 December 1971. His battalion was pitted against the 31st Baluch of the Pakistani Army. The Baluch Regiment launched continuous attacks against Brar's battalion. His soldiers had to move across the river Brahmaputra, at a location where no bridges existed. Therefore, they were able to carry only limited weapons on a man-pack basis. Brar moved from company to company in the midst of the battle, motivating his soldiers to continue the fight despite the lack of sufficient weapons.

In the years following the 1971 war, Brar was involved in anti-insurgency operations in Nagaland and Mizoram states of India.

=== Operation Blue Star ===
In 1984, Indira Gandhi, the Prime Minister of India, decided to deploy the army to flush Sangat along with Jarnail Singh Bhindranwale and his associates out of the Golden Temple at Amritsar complex. The operation was tasked to General Arunkumar Shridhar Vaidya, the then Chief of Army. K S Brar, was also a part of the team under the direction of Lt. General Krishnaswamy Sundarji (then chief of western army command) and Lt. General Ranjit Singh Dyal (then chief of staff in the command), who planned this operation codenamed Operation Blue Star.

At the time, K.S. Brar was commanding 9 Division based in Meerut, as a major general. His three brigades were based in Meerut, Delhi and Jalandhar, and two of them were made up of Sikhs. He and his wife were set to fly to Manila on the night of 1 June 1984 for a month-long vacation. However, on 31 May, he was summoned to the Chandimandir Cantonment in Chandigarh, and given the mission to carry out Operation Blue Star. His leave was cancelled in view of the urgency of the mission. The division at Amritsar was being relocated to the Indo-Pakistani to guard against any Pakistani move to support the pro-Khalistan militants.

==== Brar's version of the Operation Blue Star events ====
It is very easy to say to we could have laid siege, we could have postponed it for a day or two, or carried out the operation without the loss of life. It is only we, who were there at that time, who know what our limitations and needs were.

— K S Brar

Before the operation started, Brar walked around the Golden Temple in civilian clothes, and saw the militants and the barricades. His former superior, retired Major General Shabeg Singh, who led the militants, saw him making rounds, and knew that he was up to something. According to Brar, the Shiromani Gurdwara Parbandhak Committee (SGPC), which was supposed to have the managerial control of the temple, had lost control of the situation.

In the afternoon of 5 June, the army kept asking the militants to surrender, using the public address system. They also asked the pilgrims inside the temple to be sent out. However, none came out till 7 PM. Brar asked the police if they could send emissaries to help get the civilians out, but the police believed that anyone sent in would be killed by the militants. They believed the militants were keeping the pilgrims in as a shield. Eventually, around a hundred sick and old people were let out. These people informed the army that the others were not being allowed to come out.

When asked about why the army entered the temple premises just after Guru Arjan Dev's martyrdom day (when the number of devotees is much higher), General Brar said that it was just a coincidence. The operation had to be completed in a short time, before dawn. Otherwise, messages of army besieging the temple would have attracted mobs to the temple premises. The army could not have fired upon these civilians. More importantly, Pakistan could have come into the picture, declaring its support for Khalistan.

General Brar talked to his men (many of whom were Sikhs) personally on the morning on 5 June 1984, and told them what they planned to do and why they were doing it. He explained to them that it was not a mission against any religion, but against some militants who had defiled the sacred temple. He told his men that they may opt out of the operation, if they wished to. General Brar later said that none of his men, including Sikhs, walked away. In fact, in the unit commanded by Lieutenant Colonel Mohammad Israr (whose ten guards later led the first unit into the temple premises), the Sikh Officer Second Lieutenant Jasbir Singh Raina, raised his hand, and said that he wished to be the first one to enter the Golden Temple to wipe out the militants who had defiled the holiest Sikh shrine.

On the night of 5 June 1984, General Brar's troops stormed the temple premises. General Brar had six infantry battalions and a detachment of commandos under his command. Four of the six senior commanders of his forces were Sikhs. General Brar repeatedly asked his soldiers not to fire in the direction of the Golden Temple, even if the militants fired from that side. He later stated that there was no damage to Golden Temple, except a couple of bullet holes that could have been the militants' fire or odd stray fire from the soldiers.

To prevent any damage to the Akal Takht, General Brar's soldiers initially tried to lob stun grenades that momentarily stun people without causing any collateral damage. However, Akal Takht was completely sealed, and there was no way to lob the stun grenades inside. When his soldiers tried crawling towards the Akal Takht, several of them were killed by the militants' fire. General Brar later said in an interview that Bhindranwale and his immediate accomplices had shifted to the first floor of the Akal Takht, and this was against the tenets of Sikhism, since no one is allowed to stay above the Guru Granth Sahib.

According to General Brar, tanks with huge halogen lights were brought "to illuminate the Akal Takht, so that the soldiers could see where they were going and to momentarily blind the militants in the glare of the lights".

General Brar's troops were finally successful in removing the militants from the Akal Takht, and both Shabeg Singh and Jarnail Singh Bhindranwale were killed during the operation.

== After Operation Blue Star ==
Promoted to lieutenant general in 1987, General Brar was subsequently appointed GOC-in-C, Eastern Command, in which role he commanded the Army in the regions bordering China, Nepal, Bangladesh, and Myanmar, and was also responsible for the defence of Bhutan. He was also involved in the counter-insurgency operations in North-East India. He retired on 30 September 1992 after 38 years of service. Since his retirement, General Brar had to reside in the heavily guarded cantonment area of Mumbai. There have been attempts on his life, but none have yet succeeded.

On 30 September 2012, while on Oxford Street in London with his wife, he was knifed in the throat by four men outside a hotel. He received minor injuries and was taken to hospital. Later, he was discharged. The attackers' identities were not immediately confirmed. On 4 October, Scotland Yard announced that they had arrested three people, not publicly identified at the time, for the attack, and were continuing to look for the fourth. The following day, eight others, a woman and seven men, were also arrested and charged; on 6 October, nine of the 12 individuals charged, including the woman, were released on bail.

On 8 October, two of the men involved, Barjinder Singh Sangha (born 25 March 1979; aged 33) of Wolverhampton, and Mandeep Singh Sandhu (born 30 April 1978; aged 34) of Great Barr, Birmingham, were charged with wounding with intent to do grievous bodily harm on the retired general. Both appeared at Westminster Magistrates' Court later. Mr. Singh Sangha was also charged with common assault on General Brar's wife, Meena. In court, the two men wore identical grey T-shirts, large, flowing beards and navy blue and black turbans. Both were remanded to police custody and scheduled to be present on 7 December at Southwark Crown Court. Barjinder Singh Sangha pleaded guilty to attacking Brar in January 2013.

On 8 February, 38-year-old Harjit Kaur, of Hayes, west London, was also charged for her part in the attack. She was formally accused of wounding with intent to do grievous bodily harm and was scheduled to later appear at Westminster Magistrates' Court.

Sandhu and 36-year-old Dilbagh Singh pleaded not guilty to the same charge. On 2 April, a Metropolitan Police spokesperson said Sangha, Sandhu, Dilbagh Singh, and Kaur would stand trial around 15 July.

At the trial, which opened at Southwark Crown Court on 15 July, Kaur also denied the charge of wounding with intent to do grievous bodily harm. Crown Prosecutor Annabel Darlow said, "This was no random attack. This was a highly premeditated assault by people who thought about what they were doing and planned it." During the trial, it was disclosed that when the defendants discovered General Brar was holidaying in London without any security, they scoped out his movements over two days. The night of the attack, Kaur tailed Brar and his wife from a casino to a restaurant. After the couple had left the restaurant, she followed them onto the bus returning to their hotel. Kaur then relayed the couple's position to the other attackers, who ambushed them in Old Quebec Street. Sangha attacked the general with a knife while the others attempted to restrain him and his wife.

On 31 July, Sandhu, Dilbagh Singh, and Kaur were convicted of wounding with intent; Sangha had pleaded guilty to the charge earlier. The attackers were originally scheduled to be sentenced on 19 September; however, a pre-sentencing document had not been issued by then. As a result, on 14 October the Southwark Crown Court changed the sentencing date to 10 December.

On 10 December, Sandhu and Dilbagh Singh were sentenced to 14 years imprisonment; Kaur was sentenced to 11 years and Sangha to 10.5 years.

== Views on Operation Blue Star ==
It is easy to be critical when you are ignorant about what actually happened, why it happened and whether or not the action was avoidable.

— K S Brar

Operation Blue Star was militarily successful, but it is criticized by many for being badly planned. It is considered to be a political disaster and an unprecedented act in modern Indian history, and was followed by events like the assassination of Indira Gandhi, the assassination of A. S. Vaidya (the-then Army Chief), the subsequent 1984 anti-Sikh riots, and the Punjab insurgency.

Although General Brar later described Operation Bluestar as "most traumatic, most painful", he insisted that it was necessary. He compared Operation Blue Star to the 1979 Grand Mosque seizure.

It is unfortunate that there were so many casualties, as well as destruction, which we tried to avoid to the maximum. I am a Sikh myself, and I can assure you that there was no indiscriminate killing during the operation, and at all times our endeavour was to save life and property.

— K S Brar

When questioned about why Operation Blue Star was not as efficient as Operation Black Thunder, General Brar said that the situation during the Operation Blue Star was much more difficult due to the involvement of popular figures like Jarnail Singh Bhindranwale and General Shabeg Singh:

We tried to avoid the operation totally by requesting the inmates to surrender so that there would be no bloodshed, but it seems that they were determined not to do so. As you know, the charisma of Sant Bindranwale was such that the people were prepared to sacrifice their lives at his call. Your question about KPS Gill's success in Operation Black Thunder can be answered in one sentence – There was no Bindranwale, they had no leadership worth its name, there was no Gen Shabeg Singh, nor were there any fortifications. The inmates knew that forces had entered the shrine earlier, and therefore they would do so again. The easiest course open to them was to give up without a fight. I am not trying to belittle Mr Gill, he is a fine policeman, but we must realise that the circumstances were totally different, and it is not fair to compare the two operations.

— K S Brar

General Brar accepted that Operation Blue Star had hurt the sentiments of many Sikhs, including those who opposed the pro-Khalistan militants. However, he insisted that the act was not against any religion, but against "a section of misguided people", who held the country to ransom. He said, "I respect religion, and respect the fact that I am a Sikh."

In the 1990s, General Brar authored a book on his version of Operation Blue Star, titled Operation Bluestar: The True Story. In an interview, he said that after reading his book, a Canadian Sikh who had earlier threatened him with death, realized that "the people who had let the Sikhs down were some Sikhs and the internal politics of the Akalis", and told him that he had "cleaned the temple". He also offered to pay for translating the book into Punjabi language so that more people could read it. The book's publishers did the translation later, and the book ran into several reprints.

== Military awards and decorations ==

Param Vishisht Seva Medal	Ati Vishist Seva Medal	Vir Chakra	Naga Hills – General Service Medal
Samanya Seva Medal	Poorvi Star	Paschimi Star	Special Service Medal
Raksha Medal	Sangram Medal	Sainya Seva Medal	High Altitude Service Medal
25th Anniversary of Independence Medal	30 Years Long Service Medal	20 Years Long Service Medal	9 Years Long Service Medal

== Dates of rank ==
Insignia	Rank	Component	Date of rank
	Second Lieutenant	Indian Army	6 June 1954
	Lieutenant	Indian Army	6 June 1956
	Captain	Indian Army	6 June 1960
	Major	Indian Army	6 June 1967
	Lieutenant-Colonel	Indian Army	1973
	Colonel	Indian Army	1 April 1979
	Brigadier	Indian Army	
	Major General	Indian Army	1 May 1984
	Lieutenant-General	Indian Army	20 January 1987

Military offices
Preceded by Gurinder Singh	Commandant of the Defence Services Staff College; 1989 – 1990	Succeeded by Y K Vadehra
Preceded by Raj Mohan Vohra	General Officer Commanding-in-Chief Eastern Command; 1990 – 1992	Succeeded by Jameel Mahmood
