= Shiksha (NGO) =

Shiksha is an NGO devoted to improving the standards of education in New Delhi, India, and its neighbouring regions. Shiksha's founder and patron is the retired Indian Chief of Army Staff, General O.P. Malhotra.
