= Shabeg Singh =

Sikh dissident Indian Army officer (1925–1984)

Major General Shabeg Singh PVSM, AVSM
- Major General Shabeg Singh
- Born: Shabeg Singh; 1 May 1924; Khiala Kalan, Amritsar, Punjab, British India
- Died: 6 June 1984 (aged 60); Akal Takht, Amritsar, Punjab, India
- Relatives: Mehtab Singh Bhangu
- Military career
- Allegiance: British India; India; Sikh militants
- Branch: British Indian Army; Indian Army
- Service years: 1942 – 1977, 1984
- Rank: Major General
- Units: Garhwal Rifles; 3/Parachute Regiment; 11 Gorkha Rifles
- Commands: GOC, Madhya Pradesh, Bihar and parts of Odisha; Defence of the Akal Takht, Amritsar
- Conflicts: Second World War; Indo-Pakistani War of 1947; Sino-Indian War; Indo-Pakistani War of 1965; Indo-Pakistani War of 1971; Operation Blue Star †
- Awards: Param Vishisht Seva Medal; Ati Vishisht Seva Medal; Sikh Shaheed
- Memorials: Gurdwara Yaadgar Shaheedan, Amritsar

Major General Shabeg Singh, PVSM, AVSM (1 May 1924 – 6 June 1984), was a Sikh Indian military officer-turned militant. He had previously served in the British Indian Army followed by the Indian Army, but later joined the movement of Jarnail Singh Bhindranwale.

Shabeg Singh fought in several wars including World War II, 1947 Indo-Pak War, Sino-Indian War, 1965 Indo-Pakistan War, and notably in the Bangladesh Liberation War in which he trained the Mukti Bahini. In 1983, Singh joined Sikh movement for rights in Punjab, named Dharam Yudh Morcha. He was killed during Operation Blue Star launched by Indian Army at Golden Temple in 1984.

== Early life and education ==
Singh was born in 1924 in Bhangu Jat Sikh family of Khiala village (earlier known as Khiala Nand Singhwala), about nine miles (14 km) from the Amritsar-Chogawan Road. He was the oldest son of Sardar Bhagwan Singh and Pritam Kaur, and had three brothers and a sister. He enrolled in Khalsa College in Amritsar, and later in Government College in Lahore. Shabeg was a descendant of Mehtab Singh who was one of two who killed Massa Ranghar after he captured the Golden Temple.

== Military career ==
=== British India ===
==== World War II ====
In 1942, an officer-selection team visiting Lahore colleges recruited Singh to the British Indian Army officers cadre. After studying in the Indian Military Academy, he was commissioned in the Garhwal Rifles as a second lieutenant. Within a few days the regiment moved to Burma and later to Malaya. In 1945 when the war ended, Singh was in Malaya with his unit. His battalion reportedly captured freedom fighter Prem Sahgal and he ordered him not to be shot and instead taken to trial.

=== India ===
==== Indo-Pakistan War of 1947-1948 ====
After the partition of India, when the Indian regiments were reorganised, Singh joined the 50th Parachute Brigade of the Indian Army. He was unofficially sent for service in the 1947 Indo-Pakistan War in Kashmir along with Maharaja Yadavindra Singh's Akal Regiment. He was noted to have snuck past Pakistani lines and gave information to the Akal Regiment about the Pakistani plans.

==== Sino-Indian War of 1962 ====
In 1962, during the India-China war, he was a Lt. Col. in IV Corps and fought in Bomdi-La.

Close at their heel I sent Lt. Col. Shahbeg Singh, mainly to press them forward. He went to Chako—Eagle's Nest—and beyond and showed, whilst on his mission, plenty of drive and guts.

— Lieutenant General Brij Mohan Kaul, Untold Story

==== Indo-Pakistan War of 1965 ====
Promoted to lieutenant-colonel on 2 June 1965, he later commanded the 3rd Battalion, 11 Gorkha Rifles, and was given command of a brigade on 4 January 1968.

Soon after the 1965 operations, Singh became Col G.S. of an infantry division, after which he was given command of the crack 19 Infantry brigade in Jammu Sector.

==== Naga Insurgency ====
With his leadership qualities and use of daredevil tactics he was greatly successful in handling the counter-insurgency operations in that region and crushed the Naga Insurgency, for the next four years there were no terrorist incidents. Singh was promoted to colonel on 12 June 1968 and to substantive brigadier on 22 December.

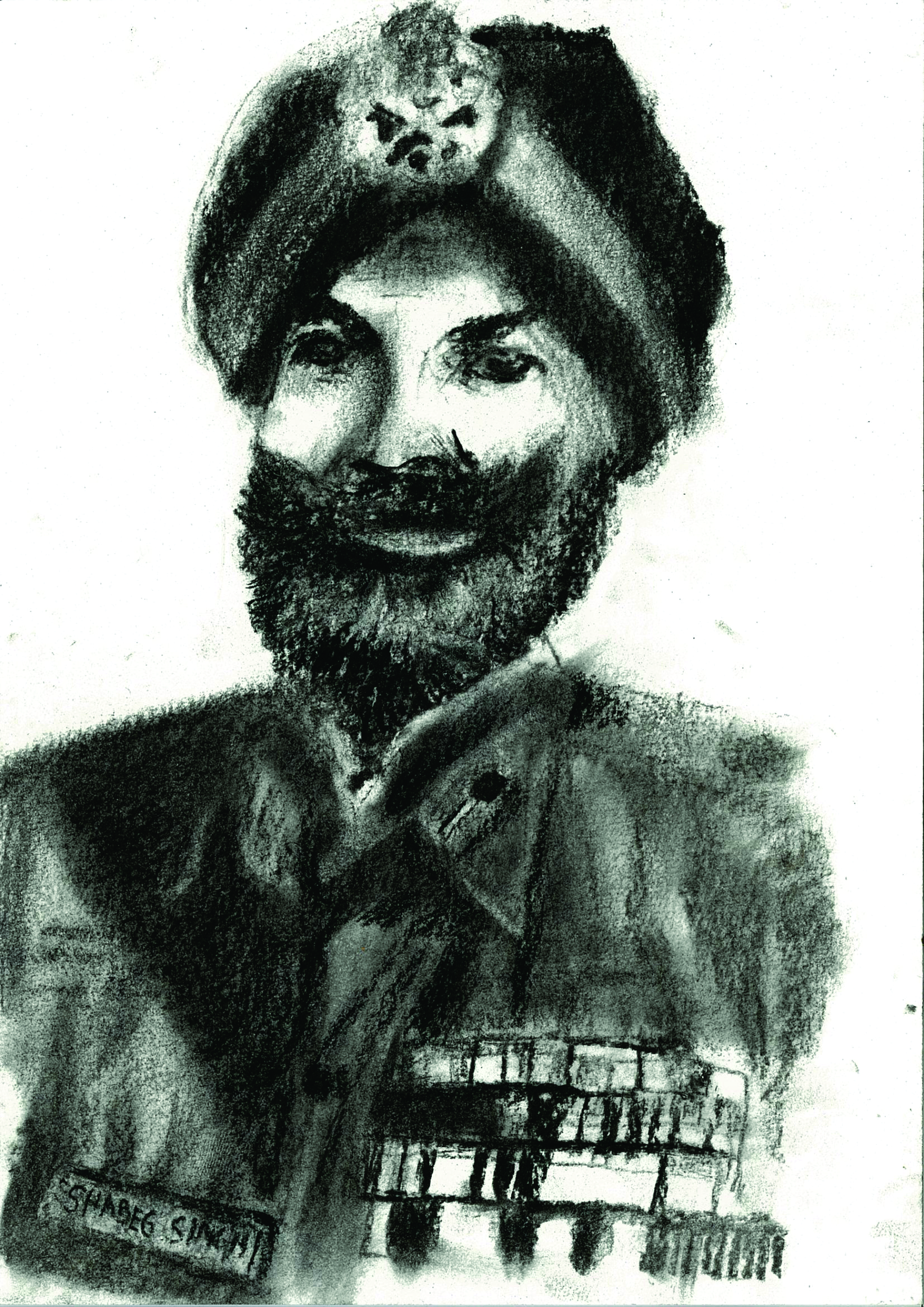
Major General Shabeg Singh, Hero of Bangladesh War, Charcoal on Paper Portrait by Amitabh Mitra

==== Indo-Pakistan War of 1971 ====
Singh was a notable figure with the press for his service in the Indo-Pakistani War of 1971. According to general A. A. K. Niazi, writing in his The Betrayal of East Pakistan, Singh met him after the fall of Dhaka and openly claimed mistreatment of the Sikhs in India, and showed him a sketched map of Khalistan. On 6 July 1972, he was appointed GOC, Madhya Bharat Area (MP, Bihar and Orissa) of Central Command, with the acting rank of major-general, and promoted to substantive major-general on 2 April 1974.

==== The Emergency ====
In 1975 Shabeg Singh was asked by Indira Gandhi to suppress the Bihar Movement through harsh measures and arrest Jayaprakash Narayan. Shabeg Singh wrote a letter back stating that the Indian Army should not be involved in political matters. Shabeg Singh was assigned a command at area headquarters in Bareilly. Later the Indian Army threw charges under special clauses which has been invoked in the Indian Army only in his case, the case was related to him buying a Jonga on proxy.

Shabeg Singh was stripped of his rank without court-martial and thus denied his full pension. Two charge sheets in an anti-corruption court were brought against him in Lucknow by India's Central Bureau of Investigation. Singh sought redress in civil courts, and was acquitted of all charges on February 13, 1984.

== Dharam Yudh Morcha and Operation Blue Star ==
During the Asian Games in 1982, Shabeg Singh, Lt. Gen. Jagjit Singh Aurora, Lt. Gen. Harbaksh Singh, Parkash Singh Badal and MIAF Arjan Singh were all forced to leave the premises of the complex as almost all Sikhs were not allowed to remain in the complex.

Shabeg Singh was mentioned in a speech by Jarnail Singh Bhindranwale while highlighting injustices to various Sikhs in 1983. He participated in the Amritsar Rally in the Golden Rail Morcha where over 10,000 ex-servicemen participated.

He joined Sikh militants, where he served as Jarnail Singh Bhindranwale's military adviser. Singh had said that he had joined Bhindranwale due to the alleged humiliation he had received, which included being stripped of his pension. Counter Intelligence reports had reported that three leaders of the Khalistan movement were Major General Shabeg Singh, Balbir Singh Sandhu and Amrik Singh. The Sikh political party Akali Dal allowed Jarnail Singh Bhindranwale to take up residence in the Golden Temple complex. Singh and his military expertise is credited with the creation of effective defences of the temple complex that made the possibility of a commando operation on foot impossible. He organised the Sikh forces present at the Harmandir Sahib in Amritsar in June 1984. Indian government forces launched Operation Blue Star in the same month. Four weeks before Operation Blue Star, Shabeg Singh had an interview with Telegraph Calcutta near Shahid Ganj Baba Deep Singh outside the Golden Temple.

As far as my relations with Sant Jarnail Singh are concerned, there is nothing to suspect. I've told you that I am a patriot. Probably in a finer mould then the Prime Minister herself. I have met Bhindranwale. There is no doubt of it and I also feel that there is a strong touch of spiritualism in this person. He is a man who stands by the truth. The Government is deliberately terming him a traitor because his brand of politics probably doesn't suit them.

— Telegraph Calcutta, May 16, 1984, Interview of Major General Suhbeg Singh

At the later stages of the operation, Singh was killed in firing between the Akal Takht and Darshani Ḍeorhi. The amount of Indian casualties his defences incurred are debated, but considered to be higher than Indian Army officials initially expected before the operation. His body was later found and identified when the operation was over. The corpse of Shabeg Singh was photographed with Indian soldiers near it. Singh was cremated according to Sikh rites and with full military honours. Sikh narrative claims his family was not allowed to attend his cremation, such as his son Prabhpal Singh. A photograph of Shabeg Singh's corpse is in the collection of the Sikh Reference Library.
