= Ranjit Singh Dyal =

Indian Army general (1928–2012)

Lieutenant General Ranjit Singh Dyal PVSM MVC
- Born: 15 November 1928; Teokar, Punjab, British India (Now in Haryana.)
- Died: 29 January 2012 (aged 83); Panchkula, Haryana, India
- Spouse: Barinder K. Dyal
- Children: Parveen K. Dyal (daughter)
- Military career
- Allegiance: India
- Branch: Indian Army
- Service years: 1946 – 1988
- Rank: Lieutenant General
- Unit: 1 Para (Special Forces)
- Commands: Southern Command; 1 Para (Special Forces)
- Awards: Param Vishisht Seva Medal; Maha Vir Chakra
- Other work: Governor of Puducherry (1988–1990) and the Andaman & Nicobar (1990–1993)

Lieutenant General Ranjit Singh Dyal, PVSM MVC (15 November 1928 – 29 January 2012) was an Indian Army general and an administrator. As a soldier, Ranjit Singh led the capture of the Haji Pir pass by the Indian army during the 1965 war with Pakistan. He also drew up the plans for Operation Blue Star, and served as the General-Officer-Commanding-in-Chief of the Southern Command. Later, he served as Lieutenant Governor of Puducherry and the Andaman and Nicobar Islands.

== Early life ==
Ranjit Singh Dyal was born in a Sikh family of the Teokar (also spelled Tuker) village in Punjab, British India (in the present-day Kurukshetra district of Haryana). His father was Sardar Bahadur Risaldar Ram Singh Dyal. His brother Rattan Singh Dyal was also in the army, and was awarded the Indian Distinguished Service Medal. He attended the Rashtriya Military School, Chail.

== Military career ==
Dyal completed his schooling from Rashtriya Military School Chail and then graduation in 1942, and was admitted to the Indian Military Academy, Dehradun in 1946. He was later commissioned in the Punjab Regiment (Para) of the Indian Army, and was assigned to the 1st Battalion, which participated in the first Indo-Pak War during 1948 as a part of the 50 Independent Parachute Brigade. Between 1959 and 1962, he was deployed in the North-East Frontier Agency (NEFA) sector. After further education from the Defence Services Staff College, he was posted as a brigade major to the 50 Independent Para Brigade. Subsequently, he became second-in-command of the 1st Para (Special Forces) battalion in the Uri sector. He later commanded this battalion during 1965-1968 in Jammu & Kashmir, and also as part of the 50 Independent Para Brigade at Agra.

=== Indo-Pakistani War of 1965 ===
During the Indo-Pakistani War of 1965, Ranjit Singh (then a Major) led the 1st Para team to capture the strategic Haji Pir pass (which was later handed over to Pakistan after the Tashkent Agreement). According to the original plan prepared by Lieutenant General Harbaksh Singh, the then General-Officer-Commanding-in-Chief (GOC-in-C) of the Western Command, the Army was to capture Rustan and Badori (or Bedori) on the way to the Haji Pir pass. Ranjit Singh's unit was tasked with capturing Sank, Sar and Ledwali Gali to stop the enemy infiltration. However, the attack on Sank on the night of 25/26 August was unsuccessful, resulting in 18 casualties. Ranjit Singh's paratroopers captured Sank on the night of 26/27 August, and Point 1033 the next day. Meanwhile, four attacks on Rustan and Badori by other battalions had proved unsuccessful. Ranjit Singh then volunteered to capture the Haji Pir pass, and his battalion took over the operation on 27 August. The unit moved along the Hyderabad nullah with only damp shakarparas and biscuits as field ration. Ranjit Singh's paratroopers were fired upon by the Pakistani Army, but were saved by an unexpected shower. They subsequently captured some Pakistani soldiers from a house during the trek, took over their weapons and used them as load carriers for rest of the journey to the pass. The unit launched the final assault on the pass on 28 August, walking up 4,000 feet on foot. The attack was successful, as the Pakistan troops retreated from the pass. Ranjit Singh Dyal was awarded the Maha Vir Chakra for this operation.

=== Maha Vir Chakra Citation ===
The citation for the Maha Vir Chakra reads as follows

Gazette Notification: 124 Pres/65,10-9-65

Operation: 1965 May - Ablaze Date of Award: 25 Aug 1965

CITATION

MAJOR RANJIT SINGH DYAL

1st BATTALION THE PARACHUTE REGIMENT

On the night of 25 August 1965, Major R. S. Dyal led an assault on Sank in J&K. It was stalled by heavy Pakistani fire. Acting with cool courage, Major Dyal managed to extricate his company intact and on the following night he again led an assault and captured Sank. He pursued the enemy relentlessly and fighting with great zeal captured Ledwali Gali by 1100 hours on 27 August. Thereafter, marching by night through very difficult terrain, he took the enemy by surprise and at 1100 hours on 28 August, captured Haji Pir Pass. In this action, a Pakistani officer and 11 Pakistani other ranks were taken prisoner. On the following morning, Major Dyal deployed a platoon to capture another feature. Seeing that our patrol had come under heavy enemy fire, he immediately went to help it with another platoon. In the face of heavy enemy machine gun and mortar fire, he led his two platoons in a lightning attack as a result of which the enemy fled in confusion.

Throughout this operation, Major R. S. Dyal displayed outstanding leadership and courage of a very high order in the best traditions of the Indian Army.

In 1984, Ranjit Singh Dyal was appointed the security adviser to the Governor of Punjab for the Operation Blue Star, and effectively had the overall charge of leading the assault. At that time, he was chief of staff of the Western Army Command. Along with Kuldip Singh Brar and Krishnaswamy Sundarji, he drew up the plans to evict the Khalistani militants from the Golden Temple in Amritsar. In 2005, the Chandigarh police arrested two Babbar Khalsa militants recruited by Jagtar Singh Hawara to kill Ranjit Singh in retaliation for the Operation Blue Star.

Ranjit Singh later became the General-Officer-Commanding-in-Chief (GOC-in-C) of the Southern Command. He also served as the first head of the Chandigarh regional chapter of the Punjab Regiment Officers Association (PROA) in 2008.

== Gubernatorial career ==
Ranjit Singh Dyal served as the 10th Lieutenant Governor of Puducherry. He served from June 1988 to February 1990. After this stint, Dyal took over as the Lieutenant Governor of Andaman and Nicobar Islands.

== Last days ==
In his last years, General Singh was diagnosed with prostate cancer. He died on 29 January 2012 in the Command Hospital at Panchkula, where he had been admitted for terminal care.

Military offices
Preceded by Tirath Singh Oberoi	General Officer Commanding-in-Chief Southern Command; 14 February 1985 - 30 November 1986	Succeeded by Depinder Singh
Government offices
Preceded by Tribhuvan Prasad Tewary	Lieutenant Governor of Puducherry; 22 June 1988 – 19 February 1990	Succeeded by Chandrawati
Preceded by Romesh Bhandari	Lieutenant Governor of the Andaman and Nicobar Islands; 25 February 1990 – 18 March 1993	Succeeded by Surjit Singh Barnala
