= G. K. C. Reddy =

Indian politician

G.K.C. Reddy is an Indian politician. As of 2014 he served as general secretary of the Karnataka state unit of the Janata Dal (United).

JD(U) fielded Reddy as its candidate for the Chikballapur Lok Sabha seat in 2014 Indian general election.

== Bibliography ==
- G. K. C. Reddy (1984). Fifty years of socialist movement in India: retrospect and prospects. Samata Era Publication.
- Sachchidanand Sinha (1984). Army action in Punjab: prelude and aftermath. Samata Era.
