= Shiksha - TeleVehicle =

Shiksha – TeleVehicle (Learn from Television), is a Bengali language 24x7 satellite channel. It is a joint venture of Webel Mediatronics Ltd. (Government of West Bengal Under-Taking) & Adjeet Advertising Agency. Officially on air date is 15 April 2013, before that it ran as a test signal from 9 April 2013. The channel content basically is class V to class X students covering all subject (board approved subjects), based on West Bengal Board of Secondary Education. The channel is approved by West Bengal State Education Ministry and West Bengal Board of Secondary Education.
