= Operation Blue Star =

1984 Indian military operation

- Part of the Khalistan movement, the Dharam Yudh Morcha, and the Insurgency in Punjab
- Akal Takht being repaired by the Indian government after the offensive; it was later pulled down and rebuilt by the Indian Sikh community.
Date	1–10 June 1984 (1 week and 2 days)
Location	Akal Takht, Amritsar, Punjab, India 31°37′12″N 74°52′37″E
Result	Indian government victory: Jarnail Singh Bhindranwale killed; Harmandir Sahib complex secured after significant Indian and Sikh losses; Escalation of tensions between separatist Sikhs and the central government; Start of the Insurgency in Punjab

Parties to the civil conflict
India; Indian Army; Central Reserve Police Force; Border Security Force; Special Frontier Force; Punjab Police	Sikh militants; Damdami Taksal; All India Sikh Student Federation; Babbar Khalsa; Sikh ex-military officers

Commanders and leaders
Arun Shridhar Vaidya; Kuldip Singh Brar; Ranjit Singh Dyal; Krishnaswamy Sundarji	Jarnail Singh Bhindranwale †; Amrik Singh †; Shabeg Singh †

Strength
List: 9th Infantry Division Support provided by: 7th Infantry Division; 15th Infantry Division; 350th Infantry Brigade; Element of 60th Engineer Regiment; 7th Garhwal Rifles; 9th Garhwal Rifles(failed, heavy casualties); 26th Madras Regiment(failed, heavy casualties); 12th Bihar Regiment; 2 Companies of 15th Kumaon Regiment; 9th Kumaon Regiment; 10th Dogra Regiment; 12th Dogra Regiment; 16th Dogra Regiment; 10th Brigade of The Guards (failed, heavy casualties); 20th Rajputana Rifles; 80 members of 1th Para SF battalion(failed, heavy casualties); 8th Battalion of Special Frontier Force; 56th Commando Company; 175th Parachute Regiment and artillery units with Ordnance QF 25-pounder guns; 700 troops from the 4th CRPF Battalion and 7th BSF Battalion; 150 Punjab Police officers; 8 Vijayanta main battle tanks from 16th Light Cavalry (1 squadron); 8 BMP-1 infantry fighting vehicles, 3 OT-64 SKOT armoured personnel carriers from 8th Mechanised Infantry Battalion	80-200 militants

Casualties and losses
83 killed (initial White Paper claim); 700 killed (As per a disclosure by Rajiv Gandhi); White Paper initial claim: 249 injured; 1 APC (OT-64 SKOT) disabled; Independent estimate: 800–900 injured	4,712 to 5,000+ civilians killed in the complex during the operation; Chand Joshi estimates another 1,000 Sikhs killed in the vicinity of the complex; Independent human rights organizations estimate over 10,000 killed total.; White Paper initial claims: 493+ killed (including 309 Sikh pilgrims); However, independent estimates ran much higher (see directly below)
- Location of the operation within the Indian state of Punjab

Operation Blue Star was a military operation by the Indian Armed Forces conducted between 1 and 10 June 1984, with the stated objective of removing Damdami Taksal leader Jarnail Singh Bhindranwale and militants from the buildings of the Golden Temple, the holiest site of Sikhism, in Amritsar. The Shiromani Akali Dal political party and other Sikh factions had been based there during the course of the Dharam Yudh Morcha. The operation would mark the beginning of the Insurgency in Punjab, India.

A long-standing movement advocating for greater political rights for the Sikh community had previously existed in the Indian state of Punjab, and in 1973, Sikh activists presented the Indian government with the Anandpur Sahib Resolution, a list of demands for greater autonomy for Punjab. The resolution was rejected by the Indian government. In July 1982, Harchand Singh Longowal, the president of the Sikh political party Shiromani Akali Dal, invited Bhindranwale to take up residence in the Golden Temple. On 1 June 1984, after abortive negotiations with the Akalis, the Prime Minister of India Indira Gandhi ordered the army to launch Operation Blue Star, attacking the Golden Temple and scores of other Sikh temples and sites across Punjab.

Underestimating the firepower possessed by the Sikh militants, Indian forces unsuccessfully assaulted the Temple using light weaponry but quickly resorted to using heavy arms, including tanks, helicopters and artillery to dislodge the well-fortified Sikh militants. Combat devolved into protracted urban warfare, with the Indian forces committing significant forces to slowly gain ground. Eventually, the Sikh militants ran out of most of their ammunition on 6 June, and by 10 June fighting had largely ceased, with the Indian forces in control of the complex. Many civilians were subject to extrajudicial killings by the military during the operation.

The military action in the temple complex was criticized by Sikhs worldwide, who interpreted it as an assault on the Sikh religion and the entire Sikh community, as well as the root cause for the subsequent insurgency, which would gain further impetus during Operation Woodrose. Five months after the operation, on 31 October 1984, Indira Gandhi was assassinated in an act of revenge by two Sikh bodyguards. Her party, the Indian National Congress, instigated and utilized public sentiment over Gandhi's death, leading to the ensuing 1984 anti-Sikh riots.

Despite accomplishing its stated objectives, the operation has been described as "disastrous" for the Indian military and state. It greatly exacerbated tensions between the Indian government and the Sikh community, turning a series of police operations into widespread sectarian violence. The brutality of the operation and high civilian casualties spawned an insurgency in Punjab, which would be waged by Sikh militants for over a decade. The operation has been used as a case study highlighting the importance of respecting religious and cultural sensitivity prior to launching military operations.

The complex would later be raided twice more as part of Operation Black Thunder I and II, with both operations having little to no civilian casualties or damage to the Temple despite larger amounts of militants than Operation Blue Star.

== Background ==
In the years leading up to the operation, there was a significant buildup in agitation for greater autonomy for the Sikh community. Economic and social pressures driven by the Green Revolution led many young Sikh men to support varying degrees of self-determination for Sikhs and Punjab, with many even advocating independence from India.

The introduction of mechanised agricultural techniques led to uneven distribution of wealth in Punjab. Industrial development did not occur at the same pace of agricultural development in Punjab, as the Indian government was reluctant to set up heavy industries in Punjab due to its status as a high-risk border state with Pakistan. Meanwhile, a rapid increase in higher education opportunities without adequate rise in jobs resulted in an increase in unemployment among educated youth. The resulting unemployed young Sikhs were drawn to militant groups, which formed the backbone of increasing militancy.

In the 1950s, the Akali Dal party launched the Punjabi Suba movement, demanding a new state within India with a majority of Punjabi speaking people, out of undivided East Punjab under the leadership of Sant Fateh Singh. This movement resulted in fraught relations with the union government, and the Golden Temple, the holiest site in Sikhism, was raided in 1955, and many of the movement's leaders were arrested. In 1966, after negotiations, the present Punjab state with a Sikh majority was formed. The Akali Dal came to power in the new Punjab state in March 1967, but early governments didn't last long due to internal conflicts and power struggles within the party. Later, the party strengthened and party governments completed their full term and eventually came to play a major role in the developments to come.

After being routed in the 1972 Punjab election, the Akali Dal put forward the Anandpur Sahib Resolution in 1973 to demand more autonomy to Punjab. The resolution was rejected by the Indian government. Activist Jarnail Singh Bhindranwale then joined the Akali Dal, and launched the Dharam Yudh Morcha movement in 1982, in a bid to urge the Indian government to implement the Anandpur Sahib Resolution.

== Prelude ==
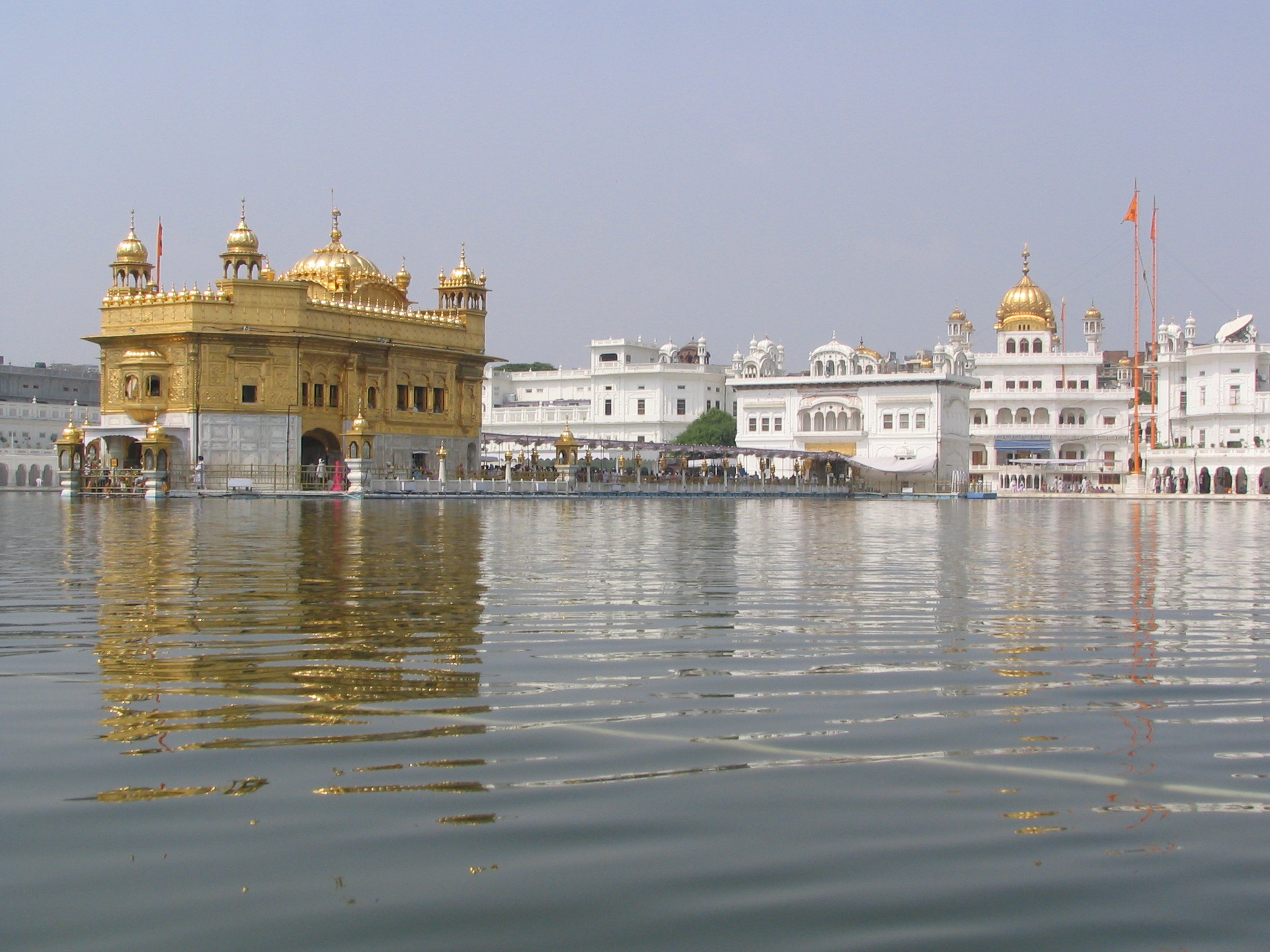
Golden Temple with Akal Takht on the right, photographed in 2006

Following the events of the 1978 Sikh-Nirankari clashes and the Dharam Yudh Morcha, Jarnail Singh Bhindranwale had risen to prominence in Sikh political circles with his policy of getting the Anandpur Resolution passed, failing which he wanted to declare a separate country of Khalistan as a homeland for Sikhs. The resolution declared its goals within the context of remaining within the federal union of India, and leaving the powers of foreign relations, defence, currency, and general communications subject to the jurisdiction of the Indian central government. Harchand Singh Longwal, the leader of the Akali Dal, stated "[let] us make it clear once and for all that the Sikhs have no designs to get away from India in any manner. What they simply want is that they should be allowed to live within India as Sikhs, free from all direct and indirect interference and tampering with their religious way of life. Undoubtedly, the Sikhs have the same nationality as other Indians." Nonetheless, Prime Minister Indira Gandhi, viewed the Anandpur Sahib Resolution as a secessionist document.

India was also aware of Pakistani influence and armament operations among the Sikh militants. According to anthropologist Cynthia Keppley Mahmood, Kashmiri fighters were present in the Golden Temple complex in 1984; both the Punjab and Kashmir insurgencies shared links with the Pakistan Inter-Services Intelligence whose aegis provided arms and training.

=== Guru Nanak Niwas ===
Following the 1978 clashes, Bhindranwale's followers had begun keeping firearms and fortified the gurdwara that served as the headquarters of the Damdami Taksal religious center.

In July 1982, Harchand Singh Longowal invited Bhindranwale to take up residence in the Golden Temple complex. He called Bhindranwale "our stave to beat the government" for the Dharam Yudh Morcha. On 19 July 1982, Bhindranwale and approximately 200 armed militants resided in the Guru Nanak Niwas, a guest house for pilgrims, within the precincts of the Golden Temple complex. Bhindranwale had effectively made the complex his headquarters. From there he met and was interviewed by international television crews.

For some months the Akali, Babbar, and Bhindranwale factions lived on the eastern end of the complex, close to the serais next to the offices of the SGPC, whose president Gurbachan Singh Tohra was charged with maintaining peace and minimizing the friction between the factions.

==== A.S. Atwal ====
On 25 April 1983, Punjab Police Deputy Inspector General A. S. Atwal was shot on the steps of the Darbar Sahib complex at point-blank range, then turned over by the assassins to ensure death, even as security guards stood just about 100 feet away. The assassination was never solved. The government promptly blamed militant groups, though all militant factions, as well as the Akalis, Bhindranwale, and the AISSF, all immediately and vehemently denied all accusations and unequivocally condemned the incident.

Bhindranwale described it as being "the handiwork of the Government to malign Sikhs" and a pretext to raid the Golden Temple complex. Subsequent disclosures revealed that Atwal had in fact met with the Akalis and Bhindranwale for "secret" talks which would have potentially paved the way for a joint Akali-Congress government led by Parkash Singh Badal. To prevent this power-sharing arrangement, either militants who sought the full implementation of the Anandpur Sahib Resolution and revenge for police operations, or the Congress faction of the Chief Minister Darbara Singh, to prevent his imminent removal from his post by Indira Gandhi which the Akalis had been demanding, had both had motive to commit the act.

Bhindranwale was not alone in suspecting government involvement. On the assassination, Longowal stated, "Whenever the situation becomes ripe for settlement, some violent incident takes place. I think there is a government conspiracy behind the DIG's murder." When asked who could be responsible, he implied Darbara Singh's involvement: "The one who is afraid of losing his seat (of power);" observers had noted that Darbara Singh had been on the verge of being replaced by the Congress high command, partly on Akali request and partly due to ineptitude. Bhindranwale condemned it as "the handiwork of the Punjab [Congress] government," and "an attempt to foil the Akali agitation and to malign the Sikhs." The president of the AISSF termed the shooting "anti-Sikh" and carried out by certain elements in the Congress party, demanding a judicial inquiry.

=== Akal Takht ===
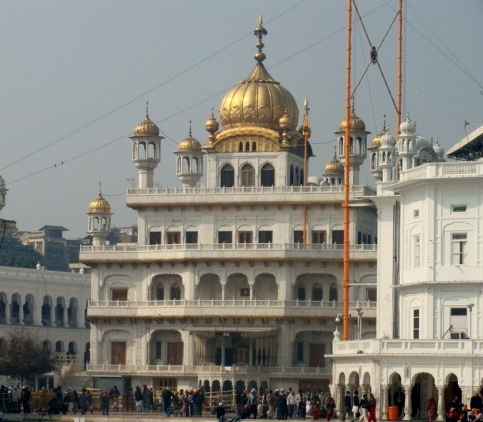
A picture of the rebuilt Akal Takht in 2013. Bhindranwale and his followers occupied Akal Takht in December 1983.

On 15 December 1983, Bhindranwale was asked to move out of Guru Nanak Niwas house by members of the Babbar Khalsa, who opposed Bhindranwale, and which acted with Longowal's support. SGPC president Tohra would then acquiesce to permit the set up of his headquarters in Akal Takht (a shrine representing the temporal power of God) in the Golden Temple. The temple high priest protested this move as a sacrilege since no Guru or leader ever resided in the Akal Takht on the floor above Granth Sahib, but Tohra convinced the high priest to allow Bhindranwale to reside on the first floor of Akal Takht.

As the Morcha continued, Akali protesters continued to fill jails as Sikhs faced increased surveillance and clashes throughout North India, and continued Akali-Congress talks failed to yield results, media reportage against Bhindranwale intensified, fueling demands from Parliament members of both houses for action against him. Despite this, Bhindranwale accused the media and the government of maligning him, the Inspector General of Punjab, P.S. Bhindar, personally selected by Indira Gandhi, issued a statement that there were no criminals hiding in the complex, and Rajiv Gandhi referred to Bhindranwale as simply a spiritual leader, with no arrest warrant of legal case against him, in March 1984. Bhindranwale and his men lived publicly in the open complex, granting interviews and attending rooftop sermons.

Relations between Bhindranwale and Longowal began to weaken in April 1984, following the assassination of one of his gunmen, the responsibility of which the AISSF (which had been banned by the government in March in the course of the Morcha) laid firmly at the feet of Longowal, despite his denials. Longowal by now feared for his own safety.

Morcha director Longowal was negotiating with Gandhi to grant some concession for which he could claim credit, so he could claim victory, end the protest, and isolate Bhindranwale. In an attempt to shore up continued support for his position as the director of the Morcha, Longowal convened a meeting of senior Sikh politicians, though 60 out of 140 would instead walk out to support Bhindranwale instead.

While the government claimed that Bhindranwale and his followers had made the Golden Temple complex an armoury and headquarters, though amassing arms and usage as a base for waging war was part of the tradition of most historical gurdwaras, which display weapons caches used by the Gurus, depicting the centrality of Sikh sites to their struggles, and that neither British nor Indian officials had interfered with this tradition until 1983.

A few leaders raised their voice against Bhindranwale in the Akal Takht complex and other gurdwaras across the state. Among the prominent ones was Giani Partap Singh, a spiritual leader and former Jathedar of the Akal Takht, who criticized Bhindranwale for keeping guns in the Akal Takht. Partap was later killed along with other dissenters including Harbans Singh Manchanda, the pro-Indira Delhi Sikh Gurudwara Management Committee president who opposed the Akali Morcha (whose killing was claimed by the Dashmesh Regiment, of unclear provenance if not a catch-all term of the media), Niranjan Singh, the Granthi of Gurudwara Toot Sahib, Granthi Jarnail Singh of Valtoha and Granthi Surat Singh of Majauli.

The militants were able to claim safe haven in the complex due to the whole or partial support received by them from key Sikh religious leaders and institutions such as the SGPC, AISSF and Jathedar (head) of the Akal Takht. The support was either voluntary or forced by using violence or threat of violence.

== Negotiations ==
In January 1984, India's secret service Research & Analysis Wing (RAW) prepared a covert plan codenamed Operation Sundown involving special forces to abduct Bhindranwale from the Golden Temple complex. A RAW unit was formed to rehearse Operation Sundown in the Sarsawa Air Force Base in Uttar Pradesh, but the operation never materialized due to Indira Gandhi's rejection.

The government sent a team led by Narasimha Rao to try to convince Bhindranwale to back out but he was adamant. The negotiations failed and the law and order situation in Punjab continued to deteriorate. Indira Gandhi tried to persuade the Akalis to support her in the arrest of Bhindranwale peacefully. These talks ended up being futile. In the days before the assault, government representatives met with Bhindranwale in a last ditch effort to negotiate a truce. The Sikhs would withdraw, believing they had seen a commando unit move into the city. Bhindranwale warned of a backlash by the Sikh community in the event of an armed assault on the Golden Temple. On 26 May, Tohra informed the government that he had failed to get Bhindranwale to agree to a peaceful resolution of the crisis, and that Bhindranwale was no longer under anyone's control. Faced with imminent army action and with Harchand Singh Longowal abandoning him, Bhindranwale declared "This bird is alone. There are many hunters after it."

Indira Gandhi then gave her permission to initiate Operation Blue Star on the recommendation of Army Chief Arun Shridhar Vaidya. She was apparently led to believe and had assumed that the operation would not involve any civilian casualties. The assumption was that when confronted Bhindranwale would surrender to the army.

== Preparations ==
=== Fortification of Golden Temple ===
An arsenal had been created within the Akal Takht over a period of several months. It was reported that trucks engaged for kar seva (religious service) and bringing in supplies for the daily langar were smuggling in guns and ammunition. The police never attempted to check these vehicles entering the Golden Temple, on instructions from superiors. During a random check one such truck was stopped and many Sten guns and ammunition were found. The Indian government White Paper alleged that after Operation Blue Star it was found that the militants had set up a grenade manufacturing facility, and a workshop for the fabrication of Sten guns inside the Temple Complex. However, the allegations of the militants being in possession of weapon workshops was never made prior to Operation Blue Star, and only after, with only the Army making these statements. The statements of multiple civilian eyewitnesses instead were consistent that the militants were a small number of men and had limited arms that were used sparingly.

==== The Third Agency ====
A cover story in Surya magazine, published soon after the Army operation, quoted "highly placed and highly disillusioned sources in the Research and Analysis Wing," claiming that most of the arms inside the complex had been smuggled in under the supervision of the Third Agency, created out of the outfit and controlled directly by the director of the Prime Minister's secretariat, to justify an assault. One week before the operation, the Punjab Police had intercepted two truck loads of weapons and ammunition in the Batala sub-division of Gurdaspur district. But the Third Agency officer in charge of Amritsar persuaded the director general of police (DGP) to release them and ensure their passage to the Darbar Sahib complex.

I.G. Bhinder, a personal friend of the Gandhi family, had informed the central government upon discovering that weapons being transferred into the complex, publicly confirming that the government had full knowledge of the weapons. According to former IPS and IAS officer Gurtej Singh, the weapons had been smuggled by Indira Gandhi's own Third Agency to be deposited into the complex; he himself had been approached by the government agency to be a possible smuggler in the summer of 1983. A brigadier posing as a Sikh, accompanied by a mutual acquaintance, had feigned concern that potentially facing an imminent army operation, Bhindranwale had no weapons, and had offered Gurtej Singh a truckload of weapons to take to the complex in a kar-sewa truck, which Gurtej Singh declined. Singh would later learn that the weapons were deposited by the acquaintance himself.

==== JS Aurora ====
When Lieutenant General J S Aurora had visited the Golden Temple with his wife in December 1983, while Bhindranwale was living in the Guru Nanak Niwas, and looked at various areas of the complex, he had noticed no defensive preparations anywhere. Visiting again on 24 February 1984, while Bhindranwale resided at the Akal Takht building, he only saw sandbags on the langar complex which "did not appear very formidable", which he was told was placed for protection after the CRPF had fired on the complex that month. He would visit again a month after the operation, attributing the professional defenses that had been built between March and June to Shabeg Singh who had served under him.

After Blue Star, Aurora would debunk reports of large amounts of sophisticated weapons stockpiled in the complex, commenting on the lack of sophisticated weapons, mentioning a number of light machine guns and two rocket launchers, but the lack of medium machine guns or mortars, with the only weapons bearing foreign markings being 60 self-loading rifles. He would ascribe most of the weaponry to either simply having been picked up from misplaced weapons drops during border wars, issued by the government to people living close to the border for security purposes, government gun-running, or from Punjab's long-established rural trade of unaccounted guns, used in family feuds, property disputes, dacoit bands and the like. Describing the weaponry seized after the operation, he stated, "Quite a lot, yes, but the impression that has been built up in the public mind of foreign governments deliberately arming the terrorists with a view to overthrowing the government is grossly overdone."

The Harmandir Sahib compound and some of the surrounding houses were fortified under the guidance of Major General Shabeg Singh, who had joined Bhindranwale's group after dismissal from the army. During their occupation of Akal Takht, Bhindranwale's group had begun fortifying the building. The Statesman reported that light machine guns and semi-automatic rifles were known to have been brought into the compound, and strategically placed to defend against an armed assault on the complex. Amidst claims of foreign involvement and the heavier weapons having Pakistani or Chinese markings on them, according to Aurora only 60 self-loading riles were foreign made. The rest were Indian. He also said that there were no medium machine guns and only two RPGs. Arora says that the arsenal was not truly sophisticated. A Lt. Colonel part of the Operation later revealed that militants only had 4 light machine gun magazines. According to him a single light machine gun carries 12 magazines. He revealed that the main gun that was kept and used by militants was AK-47s.

=== Presence of troops ===
According to Congress claims, holes were smashed through the marble walls of Akal takht to create gun positions. Walls were broken to allow entry points to the tiled courtyards. Secure machine gun nests were created. All of these positions were protected by sandbags and newly made brick walls. The windows and arches of Akal Takht were blocked with bricks and sandbags. Sandbags were placed on the turrets. Every strategically significant building of the temple complex, apart from the Harmandir Sahib in the center, had been fortified in a similar manner and allegedly defaced. The fortifications also included seventeen private houses in the residential area near the Temple. All the high rise buildings and towers near the temple complex were occupied. The militants manning these vantage points were in wireless contact with Shabeg Singh in Akal Takht. Under the military leadership of Major General Singh, ex-army veterans and deserters had trained Bhindranwale's men.

The militants in the complex were anticipating an attack by government troops. The defences in the complex were created with the purpose of stalling an assault, giving time to provoke Sikhs in the villages and encourage them to march en masse towards the Golden Temple in support of the militants. Sufficient food to last a month was stocked in the complex.

During this period police and security forces stationed around the temple complex were allowed only within 200 yards. This was to avoid the 'desecration' of the temple by their presence. The security forces were prevented by the politicians from taking action in enforcing the law. Even self-defence from the militants was made difficult. On 14 February 1984, a police post near the entrance of the Temple was attacked by a group of militants. Six fully armed policemen were captured and taken inside. After twenty four hours the police responded and sent in a senior police officer for negotiation. He asked Bhindranwale to release his men, along with their weapons. Bhindranwale agreed and delivered the dead body of one of the hostages who had been killed. Later the remaining five policemen were released alive, but their weapons were kept.

The fortifications of the temple denied the army the possibility of commando operations. The buildings were close together and had labyrinthine passages all under the control of the militants. Militants in the temple premises had access to langars, food supplies, and water from the Sarovar (temple pond). Militants were well stocked with weapons and ammunition. Any siege under these circumstances would have been long and difficult. The option of laying down a long siege was ruled out by the army due to the "fear of uprisings in the countryside".

=== Intensification ===
Police methods normally used on common criminals were used on protesters during the Dharam Yudh Morcha, creating state repression affecting a very large segment of Punjab's population. This resulted in retaliatory violence from a section of the Sikh population and the widening the scope of the conflict, creating fresh motives for Sikh youth to turn to insurgency. The concept of Khalistan was still vague even while the complex was fortified under the influence of former Sikh army officials alienated by government actions who now advised Bhindranwale, Major General Shabeg Singh and retired Major General and Brigadier Mohinder Singh, and at that point the concept was still not directly connected with the movement he headed. In other parts of Punjab, a "state of chaos and repressive police methods" combined to create "a mood of overwhelming anger and resentment in the Sikh masses against the authorities," making Bhindranwale even more popular, and demands of independence gain currency, even amongst moderates and Sikh intellectuals.

On 12 May 1984, Ramesh Chander, son of Lala Jagat Narain and editor of media house Hind Samachar group, was murdered by pro-Bhindranwale militants. In addition, seven editors and seven news hawkers and newsagents were killed in a planned attack on the freedom of media house, to cripple it financially. Punjab Police had to provide protection for the entire distribution staff.

Violent incidents including arson, bombings, and shootings increased over the following months. The total number of deaths was 410 in violent incidents and riots, and 1,180 people were injured.

On 30 May 1984, soon after Longowal had announced the Grain Roko Morcha to stop tax revenue and grain from leaving Punjab in protest, set for 3 June, Indira Gandhi had Zail Singh authorize military rule in Punjab. While he had reportedly remained unaware of the planned attack on the Darbar Sahib, some Akali leaders had known of the plan through secret communications with New Delhi. Tohra would inform G.S. Grewal, "I've come from meeting the Governor, I've told him it's not within our capacity to control Jarnail Singh now, if you want to do it, do it," though he and the other Akalis likely did not comprehend the nature and scale of the attack, as they barricaded themselves to save their lives in the complex for days during the operation.

==== Government claims ====
According to government figures released after the operation in the White Paper, the combined figure of Sant Nirankaris and Hindu deaths before the operation was 165. According to police records, over "fifty persons lost their lives or received serious injuries" in the period before the army action in Amritsar, including police informers and Hindus including Arya Samaj news editor Lala Jagat Narain, his son and successor Ramesh Chander, and BJP MLA Harbans Lal Khanna, There were claims of "killer squads", which had originated when the media had sensationalized Bhindranwale's calls for youth self-defense against the police during the Dharam Yudh Morcha.

Almost all the murders remained unsolved, and the incidents were regularly denounced by "all segments of the Sikh religio-political spectrum." The government never provided evidence of the supposedly planned massacre of Hindus, which had been "the government's explanation for starting the operation," alleged by a single MP, that triggered Operation Blue Star, although the pace of attacks was increasing. Congress member of parliament Amarjit Kaur, who referred to the Akali Dal as "the enemy within" and who had opposed the creation of the Punjabi Suba, alleged that Bhindranwale wanted to start a civil war between the Hindus and Sikhs. Meanwhile, the number of killings had been rising all over the state, with sometimes more than a dozen a day. On 2 June in the last 24 hours before the announcement of the operation 23 people were killed.

In June 1984, the army was called out to help the civil administration in Punjab in response to a request from the Punjab Governor, B. D. Pande, "in view of the escalating violence by terrorists in Punjab".

Militants had already started the movement to drive Hindus out of certain areas to make way for Sikhs coming in from other states. Due to the increased incidents of religious violence, exchange of population had already started in Punjab. New Khalistani currency was being printed and distributed. By May 1984, the establishment of an independent Khalistan seemed imminent, as the Indian government had "received intelligence" that Pakistan had been supporting the militants with arms and money, and if Khalistan declared its independence there was the risk of Pakistan recognizing the new country and sending the Pakistani Army into Indian Punjab to protect it.

=== Army preparations ===
According to the then-Vice Chief of the Army Staff, S. K. Sinha the army had begun preparations for an attack on the Golden Temple 18 months prior. Two months prior to the Operation the Air Force had helicopters flying above the temple taking photographs. The Central Reserve Police Force (CRPF) had surrounded the temple two months prior to the Operation. The facetious nature of the naming of the operation was revealed to Kirpal Dhillon, who would be appointed director general of police three weeks after the operation, by a semiretired major general who had held a key position in the army headquarters at the time, who had been discussing rumors of an army action (which had become common by early 1984) and its name with a junior deputy while passing by an advertisement for Blue Star air conditioners.

== Operation ==
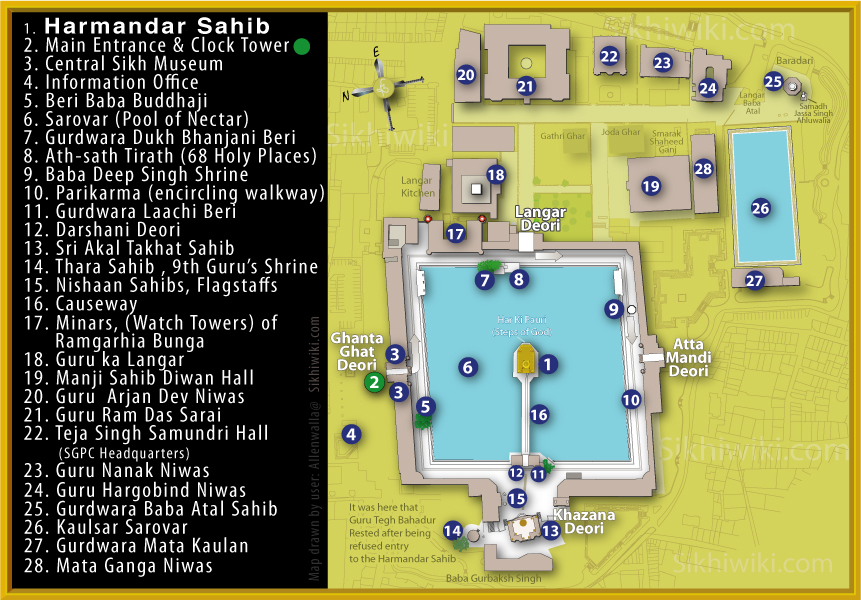
Map of the Harmandir Sahib Complex

Operation Blue Star was launched to remove Jarnail Singh Bhindranwale and his followers who had sought cover in the Amritsar Harmandir Sahib Complex.

On 3 June, a 36-hour curfew was imposed on the state of Punjab with all methods of communication and public travel suspended. The electricity supply was also interrupted, creating a total blackout and cutting off the state from the rest of the world. Complete media censorship was enforced.

The army stormed Harmandir Sahib on the night of 5 June under the command of Major-General Kuldip Singh Brar. The forces had full control of Harmandir Sahib by the morning of 7 June. There were casualties among the army, civilians, and militants. Sikh leaders Bhindranwale and Shabeg Singh were killed in the operation.

=== Generals ===
The armed Sikhs within the Harmandir Sahib were led by Bhindranwale, former Maj. Gen. Shabeg Singh, and Amrik Singh, the President of the All India Sikh Students Federation from Damdami Taksal.

General Arun Shridhar Vaidya was the Chief of the Indian Army. Lt. Gen. Krishaswamy Sundarji, GOC Western Command, planned and coordinated Operation Blue Star. From the Indian Army Maj. Gen. Kuldip Singh Brar had command of the operation. On 31 May he had been summoned from Meerut and asked to lead the operation to remove the militants from the temple. Brar was a Jat Sikh, the same caste as Bhindranwale, and was also acquainted with Shabeg Singh, having been his student at the Indian Military Academy at Dehradun. Among the six generals leading the operation, four were Sikhs.

The army operation was further subdivided along two subcategories:

1. Operation Metal: to take out the militants including Bhindranwale from the Golden Temple complex. Brar's 9 Infantry Division was deputed for this.
2. Operation Shop: to attack extremist areas throughout the Punjab state and deal with remaining militants in the countryside.

In addition, the army carried out Operation Woodrose, in which units were deployed to the border areas, replacing the pickets routinely held by the paramilitary Border Security Force (BSF). The border pickets were held in at least company strength.

=== 1 June ===
On 1 June 1984 the Indian security forces began the operation by firing into various buildings with the goal of assessing the training of the militants. Eyewitness testimony of pilgrims inside the temple complex state that the Harmandir Sahib was fired on initially by security forces on 1 June and not 5 June as reported by the army. The firing began at about 12:40 p.m. and went until about 8:40 p.m. It was by the C.R.P.F and they used M.M.G., L.M.G. and rifles. It resulted in the main shrine of the Harmandir Sahib sustaining 34 bullet marks. The action claimed the lives of eight pilgrims, including a woman and a child, inside the temple complex and injured 25 others. Devinder Singh Duggal, who was in-charge of the Sikh Reference Library located inside of the Golden Temple complex and an eye-witness to Operation Blue Star, stated that the militants were given instructions to not fire until the army or security forces entered the temple, in order to conserve their limited ammunition. Duggal stated "...when I heard in the news bulletin that there was unprovoked firing from inside the Temple, but that the security forces showed extreme restrain and did not fire a single shot, I was surprised at this naked lie." The deaths of at least three of the pilgrims was confirmed by the eyewitness testimony of a female Sikh student who had dressed their wounds and who later witnessed their deaths in Guru Nanak Nivas. According to Kirpal Singh eleven were killed in the firing. Furthermore, Duggal stated that on 2 June 1984 a team of the BBC, including Mark Tully, were taken around the Darbar Sahib and shown 34 holes, some of them as big as three inches in diameter, caused by the bullets on all sides of the temple. Mark Tully noted, "The C.R.P.F. firing took place four days before the army actually entered the Temple".

The government waited as people entered the complex in large numbers in preparation for the June 3 commemoration of Guru Arjan's martyrdom; the army assault would not be launched in earnest until after the complex was at capacity.

=== 2 June ===
The army had already sealed the international border from Kashmir to Ganga Nagar, Rajasthan. At least seven divisions of troops were deployed in villages of Punjab. The soldiers began taking control of the city of Amritsar from the paramilitary. A young Sikh officer posing as a pilgrim was sent in to reconnoitre the temple. He spent an hour in the complex noting defensive preparations. Plans were made to clear vantage points occupied by militants outside the complex before the main assault. Patrols were also sent to study these locations.

As the Indian army was sealing off exits out of Amritsar, it continued to allow pilgrims to enter the temple complex. All outgoing trains from Amritsar had left by noon and other trains were cancelled. The CRPF outside the temple had been replaced by the army who were taking into custody any visitors leaving the temple. A pilgrim who survived the assault stated that he did not leave the temple because of the detention of visitors by the army.

By nightfall media and the press were gagged and rail, road and air services in Punjab were suspended. Foreigners and non-resident Indians were denied entry. General Gauri Shankar was appointed as security advisor to the Governor of Punjab. The water and electricity supply was cut off. There were no warnings to civilians nor plans to evacuate them to limit casualties; rather, shoot-on-sight commands had been given to the army, whose quarantine would stop all rail, road, and foot traffic in Punjab by the next day.

=== 3 June ===
According to an All Sikhs Student Federation member, 10,000 people had come from outside, including many women, with 4,000 of them young people. The Shiromani Gurdwara Prabhandak Committee estimates that approximately 10,000 to 15,000 pilgrims had come from Punjab's cities and villages to attend the Gurpurab. Along with the pilgrims were 1,300 Akali workers led by Jathedar Nachattar Singh who had come to participate in the Dharam Yudh Morcha and to court arrest. The Akali jathas who were also present consisted of about 200 women, 18 children and about 1,100 men and were also forced to stay inside the temple complex. Those who were inside were not allowed to go out after 10:00 pm on 3 June because of the curfew placed by the military.

In addition, as of 3 June the pilgrims who had entered the temple in the days prior were unaware that Punjab had been placed under curfew. Thousands of pilgrims and hundreds of Akali workers had been allowed to collect inside the Temple complex without any warning either of the sudden curfew or imminent Army attack.

In the night the curfew was re-imposed with the army and para-military patrolling all of Punjab. The army sealed off all routes of ingress and exit around the temple complex.

Army units led by Indian Army Lt. Gen Kuldip Singh Brar surrounded the temple complex on 3 June 1984. Just before the commencement of the operation, Lt. Gen Brar addressed the soldiers:

The action is not against the Sikhs or the Sikh religion; it is against terrorism. If there is anyone amongst them, who have strong religious sentiments or other reservations, and do not wish to take part in the operation he can opt out, and it will not be held against him.

— Kuldip Singh Brar,

However, no one opted out and that included many "Sikh officers, junior commissioned officers and other ranks".

=== 4 June ===
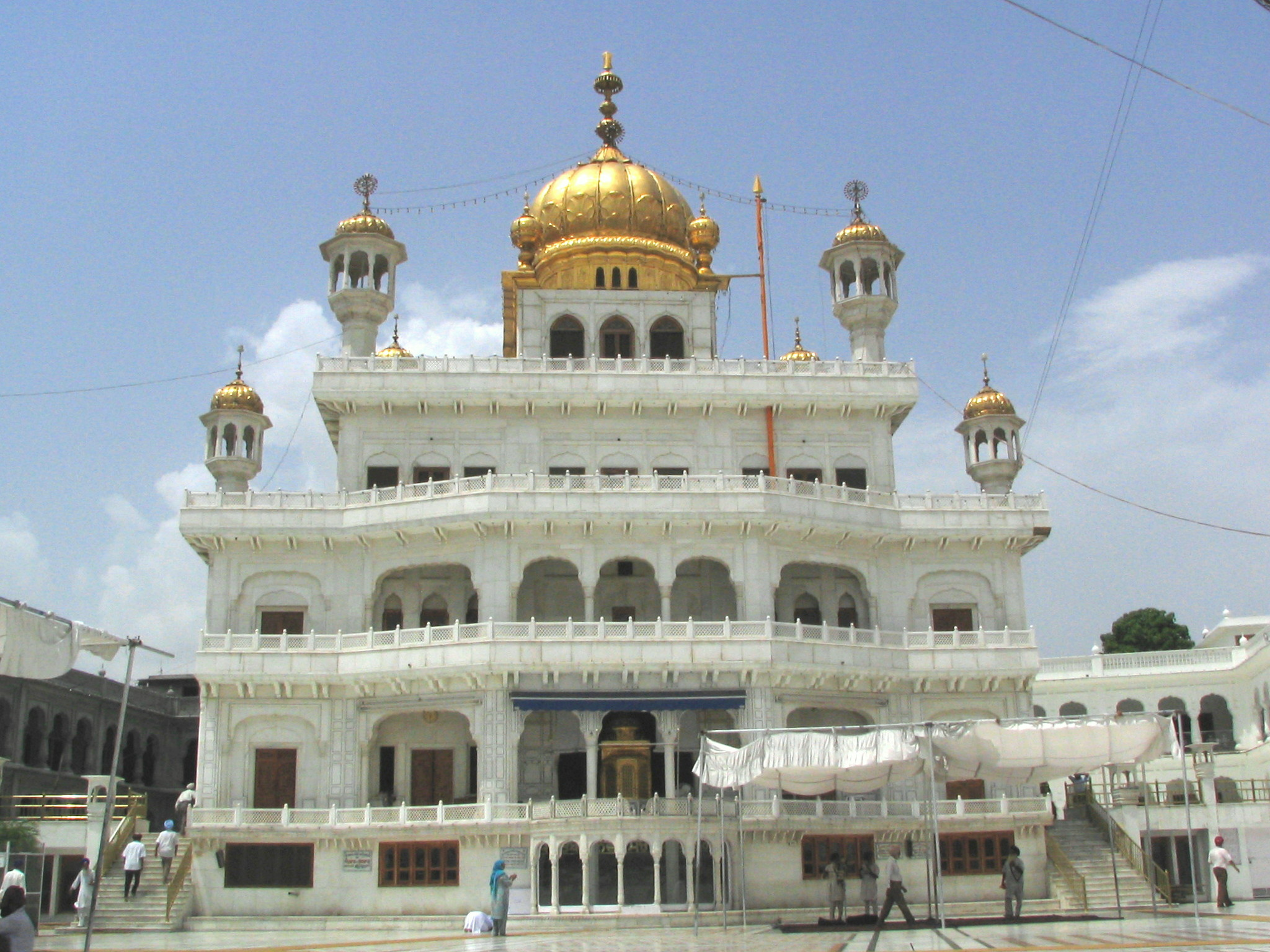
Akal Takhat, Amritsar

The accounts of survivors inside of the temple complex were consistent with the military commencing its assault in the early morning of June 4, which would continue until the 7th.

The army began bombarding the historic Ramgarhia Bunga, the water tank, and other fortified positions with Ordnance QF 25-pounder artillery. After destroying the outer defences laid by Shabeg Singh, the army moved tanks and APCs onto the road separating the Guru Nanak Niwas building. The army helicopters spotted the massive movements, and General Krishnaswamy Sundarji sent tanks and APCs to meet them.

Duggal states that the army attack started at 4:00 am with a 25-pounder that fell in the ramparts of the Deori to the left of the Akal Takht Sahib. Duggal further states that during the assault he saw a number of dead bodies of children and women in the Parikrama. The army's assault had prevented Duggal from leaving the room in which he had taken shelter as he believed it would have resulted in his death. Another eyewitness, Bhan Singh the Secretary of the SGPC, states that the army provided no warning of the start of the attack which prevented pilgrims and those who came as a part of the Dharam Yudh Morcha from exiting. A female survivor recalled that it was not until the army began using explosives on the temple that they were aware that it had commenced its assault. She further stated that within the Harmandir Sahib, there were some granthis (priests), ragis (singers), sevadars (service volunteers) and yatris (pilgrims) but no armed militants. Prithpal Singh, the sevadar on duty at the Akal rest house which housed pilgrims, stated that it was shelled by the military. As of May 1985 during the recording of Prithpal's account, the Akal Rest house still bore the bullet marks caused by the Indian Army.

==== Lack of civilian forewarning ====
On 4 June no warning was provided to the pilgrims to evacuate and the pilgrims were deterred of leaving as the Indian army would arrest anyone who left the temple complex. Although officially the army stated that it made announcements, the eyewitness testimony of pilgrims who were arrested after the assault was used as the basis of a decision in the Amritsar district court in April 2017 which held that the army made no such announcements. The eyewitness testimony of survivors of the army's assault on the temple complex were consistent with stating that they were unaware of the start of the attack by the army until it took place without notice on the morning of 4 June.

In response to the claim that on 4 and 5 June, messages asking pilgrims to leave the temple were played over loudspeakers, in 2017 the Amritsar District and Sessions Judge Gurbir Singh gave a ruling which stated that there was no evidence that the Indian army provided warnings for pilgrims to leave the temple complex before commencing their assault. Judge Gurbir Singh wrote in his ruling, "There is no evidence that army made any announcements asking ordinary civilians to leave Golden Temple complex before launching the operation in 1984...There is no written record of any public announcement by the civil authorities requesting the people to come out of the complex. No log of vehicle used for making such announcements is there...The event underlines the human rights violations by troops during the operation. The lack of evidence of any warning to vacate the temple complex was the basis of a compensatory award of ₹400,000 rupees (approximately $6,150 in 2017 currency) given to 40 Sikhs in 2017, 33 years later, who had been illegally detained by the Indian military in Jodhpur, Rajasthan for four to five years, even after their discharge had been ordered by courts.

According to Kirpal S. Dhillon, who would be appointed DGP of the state three weeks after the operation, it was clear that there were no escape routes for pilgrims amid chaos, except if army had taken help of akalis, who were also trapped in the complex, which they did not.

=== 5 June ===
Most civilian deaths would take place in the adjoining pilgrim rest houses, which would show no signs of direct shelling, corroborating civilian reports of close-range shooting massacres by the army. The hands of Sikh male pilgrims were tied by their own turbans as they were beaten and left for dead, or shot. Screams were heard from the rest houses by eyewitness accounts, as people were set alight in the rest houses.

On 5 June, the blind head Ragi of the Harmandir Sahib Amrik Singh and Ragi Avtar Singh, were struck by bullets inside of the Harmandir Sahib by the Indian army. The army's targeting of the Harmandir Sahib with bullets was in contrast to the alleged restraint stated in the army issued White Paper on 10 July 1984. As of 5 June pilgrims who had reached the temple on 3 June were still present hiding in rooms. In one room 40–50 persons were huddled together including a six-month-old child during the army's assault. A female survivor of the assault stated that the army asked people to leave their hiding spots and guaranteed safe passage and water; she recalled seeing the dead bodies of pilgrims who answered the announcements lying in the Parikrama the next morning.

In the morning, shelling started on the building inside the Harmandir Sahib complex. The 9th division launched a frontal attack on the Akal Takht, although it was unable to secure the building. The Golden Temple complex had honeycombed tunnel structures.

==== 7:00 pm ====
The BSF and CRPF attacked Hotel Temple View and Brahm Boota Akhara, respectively, on the southwest fringes of the complex. By 10:00 pm both the structures were under their control. The army simultaneously attacked various other gurdwaras. Sources mention either 42 or 74 locations.

==== 10:00 pm – 7:30 am ====
Late in the evening, the generals decided to launch a simultaneous attack from three sides. Ten Guards, 1 Para Commandos and Special Frontier Force (SFF) would attack from the main entrance of the complex, and 26 Madras and 9 Kumaon battalions from the hostel complex side entrance from the south. The objective of the 10 Guards was to secure the northern wing of the Temple complex and draw attention away from SFF who were to secure the western wing of the complex and 1 Para Commandos who were to gain a foothold in Akal Takht and in Harmandir Sahab, with the help of divers. 26 Madras was tasked with securing the southern and the eastern complexes, and the 9 Kumaon regiment with SGPC building and Guru Ramdas Serai. Twelve Bihar was charged with providing a cordon and fire support to the other regiments by neutralising enemy positions under their observance.

An initial attempt by the commandos to gain a foothold at Darshani Deori failed as they came under devastating fire, after which several further attempts were made with varying degrees of success. Eventually, other teams managed to reach Darshani Deori, a building north of the Nishan Sahib, and started to fire at the Akal Takth and a red building towards its left, so that the SFF troops could get closer to the Darshani Deori and fire gas canisters at Akal Takth. The canisters bounced off the building and affected the troops instead.

Meanwhile, 26 Madras and 9 Garhwal Rifles (reserve troops) had come under heavy fire from the Langar rooftop, Guru Ramdas Serai and the buildings in the vicinity. Moreover, they took a lot of time in forcing open the heavy Southern Gate, which had to be shot open with tank fire. This delay caused a lot of casualties among the Indian troops fighting inside the complex. Three tanks and an APC had entered the complex.

Crawling was impossible as Shabeg Singh had placed light machine guns nine or ten inches above the ground. The attempt caused many casualties among the Indian troops. A third attempt to gain the Pool was made by a squad of 200 commandos. On the southern side, the Madras and Garhwal battalions were not able to make it to the pavement around the pool because they were engaged by positions on the southern side.

Despite the mounting casualties, General Sunderji ordered a fourth assault by the commandos. This time, the Madras battalion was reinforced with two more companies of the 7th Garhwal Rifles under the command of General Kuldip Singh Brar. However, the Madras and Garhwal troops under Brigadier A. K. Dewan once again failed to move towards the parikarma (the pavement around the pool).

Brigadier Dewan reported heavy casualties and requested more reinforcements. General Brar sent two companies of 15 Kumaon Regiment. This resulted in yet more heavy casualties, forcing Brigadier Dewan to request tank support. As one APC inched closer to the Akal Takht it was hit with an anti-tank RPG, which immediately immobilized it. Brar also requested tank support. The tanks received the clearance to fire their main guns (105 mm high-explosive squash head shells) only at around 7:30 am.

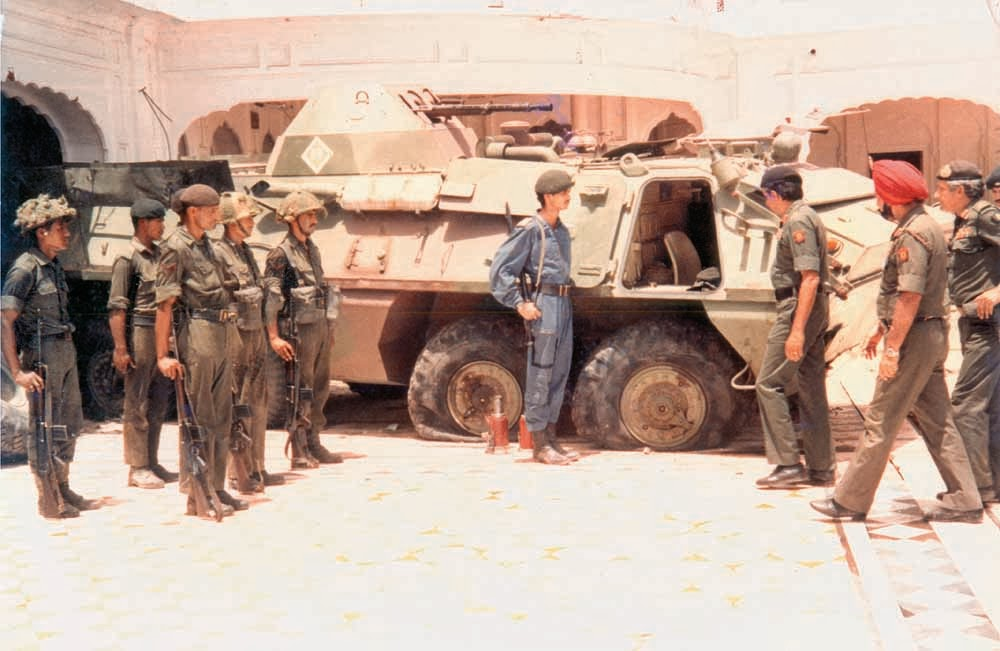
An OT-64 SKOT disabled by RPGs

According to Giani Puran Singh, a priest in Harimander Sahib, at 10;00 pm tanks began entering the temple complex. At the same time armored carriers began entering to.

==== Popular uprising ====
During the course of the operation, army conduct towards civilians found in the offices and rest houses, who had been ordered to "surrender" on the night of 5 June, worsened as reports of a popular uprising of Sikhs across Punjab and India heading to defend the Darbar Sahib. Sikh villagers had begun to march to the site, grabbing whatever implements available, like staffs and sickles, to defend it. Many, including young and elderly, including women, were killed, as slogans in support of Sikhism and Bhindranwale was followed by machine gun fire and screams. According to Khushwant Singh, throngs of up to 20,000 were stopped by helicopters, tanks, and armored cars. Army commanders, considering time to be running out before a mass uprising, decided to escalate the operation to any extent to end the operation that night, when Akali leaders, including Longowal, Tohra, and others, would be taken into custody around 1 a.m. on 6 June, possibly by force from a room in the Teja Singh Samundri Hall, into an armoured personnel carrier.

=== 6 June ===
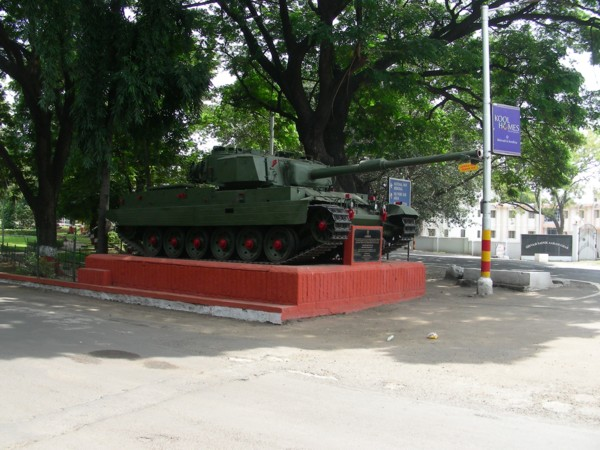
The army used seven Vijayanta Tanks during the operation

The heavy artillery, reinforcements, and chemical weapons had not yet finished off the approximately 200 militants by 6 June; small groups of fighters, armed with mostly World War II-era guns, would continue to emerge from under the Akal Takht and engage with the army until death. Tanks would be driven onto the complex for the final assault.

According to Maj. Gen. J. S. Jamwal, who commanded the 15th Infantry Division, as the assault got bogged down in the early hours, Brar began to panic, revealed in his voice when on the radio to the 10th Guards, "what should I do...get something done." He had apparently having "forgotten" of his reserves, two companies of the 9 Garhwal Rifles. When reminded of them, he then ordered them in, only then managing to reach an advantageous position.

At 10:00 am the "vigorous" battle ended. In the battle about 40–50 Sikhs fought the army continuously until they died or ran out of ammunition. Once this battle ended the army gained control of Darshani Deori, Clock Tower, and Atta Mandi.

Vijayanta tanks shelled the Akal Takht. It suffered some damage but the structure was still standing. The Special Group, a confidential special forces unit of the R&AW, began its planned raid on this day.

Afterwards, the Indian military detained surviving pilgrims on the grounds that they were affiliated with the militants and subjected them to interrogations, beatings and executions.

=== 7–10 June ===
The battle ended at around 1 a.m. on 7 June. Few surviving snipers who had managed to hold off the army for 3 days were killed.

The army entered the Akal Takht. Dead bodies of Jarnail Singh Bhindranwale, Shabeg Singh and Amrik Singh were discovered in the building, and taken by the army. Photographs smuggled out that year would include one of Shabeg Singh's body showing signs of likely post-capture torture, with a gouged eye and battered body.

According to Giani Puran Singh a Granthi of the Golden Temple on June 7 at Ramgharia Bunga 4 Sikh held out at a trench they had dug. Giani Puran Singh was told by soldier to negotiate with them, but they pledged to die there. They killed multiple soldiers. The army failed to fight the Sikh so they attempted bombing them, but the Sikh still held out. They were eventually drawn out with chemical gas and were killed on June 10.

President Zail Singh visited the temple premises after the operation, while making the round, he was shot at by a sniper from one of the buildings that the army had not yet cleared. The bullet hit the arm of an army colonel who led a Commando battalion. He was accompanying the president. On June 8, he was shot by the Sikh held out in Ramgharia Bunga.

The Sikh held out were Major Singh Nagoke, Dalbir Singh, Swaran Singh Rode, Ram Singh Sultanpuri, and Nand Singh Patti.

==== Sikh Reference Library ====
Around noon on 7 June, the army burned down the Sikh Reference Library. The library contained numerous artifacts and hundreds of original manuscripts, including letters signed by the Sikh gurus. It had been intact on the night of 6 June, when Devinder Singh Duggal, its director, had left; he would be arrested a week later for refusing to sign a receipt relinquishing the building to the army. According to library staff, at least 13,000 books had vanished before the library was later set alight; the SGPC had corresponded with the central government for their return, as they were believed to be in possession of the Army, who was believed to have stuffed the books in more than 150 gunny bags and kept in Meerut. Much the remaining artifacts and racks bore bullet holes, and many paintings were incinerated or damaged beyond repair.

Jamwal had ordered an anti-tank shell fired into the Akal Takht, which would instead be "misdirected" and hit the Sikh Reference Library, causing the fire. The shell would be one of 20 shells fired at the Akal Takht, some of which would miss and land behind the complex, hitting the army's own positions.

=== Mutinies by Sikh soldiers ===
According to Hamish Telford, "Operation Blue Star placed every Sikh soldier in a moral quandary: they were asked to submerge their cultural identity for the sake of professional duty." Cases of spontaneous mutinies by Sikh soldiers, mostly raw recruits, were reported from different places. From eight army cantonments far from Punjab, approximately 4,000 young men, generally without a plan had set upon main roads to apparently reach Amritsar, and were intercepted and mostly arrested, with some casualties. Most had not used the weapons that they had been well-trained with, though the mutinies would still create some panic in Delhi.

On 7 June, six hundred soldiers of the 9th Battalion of the Sikh Regiment, almost the entire other ranks' strength, mutinied in Sri Ganganagar. The largest mutiny took place in Sikh Regimental Centre at Ramgarh in Bihar where recruits for the Sikh Regiment are trained. There, 1,461 soldiers—1,050 of them raw recruits, stormed the armoury, killing one officer and injuring two before they set out for Amritsar. The leaders of the mutiny divided the troops into two groups just outside of Banaras to avoid a rumoured roadblock. One half was engaged by army artillery at Shakteshgarh railway station; those who managed to escape were rounded up by 21st Mechanised Infantry Regiment. The other half engaged with the artillery and troops of 20th Infantry Brigade, during which 35 soldiers (both sides) were killed. There were five more smaller mutinies in different parts of India. In total 55 mutineers were killed and 2,606 were captured alive.

The captured mutineers were court-martialed, despite efforts by various groups including retired Sikh officers to get them reinstated. In August 1985, 900 of the 2,606 mutineers were rehabilitated by the Central government as part of the Rajiv-Longowal accord.

== Casualties ==
=== Domestic estimates ===
The Indian army initially placed total casualties at 554 Sikh militants and civilians dead, and 83 killed (4 officers, 79 soldiers) and 236 wounded among government forces. Kuldip Nayar cites Rajiv Gandhi as allegedly admitting that nearly 700 soldiers were killed. This number was allegedly disclosed by Gandhi in September 1984 as he was addressing the National Student Union of India session in Nagpur. Per Ved Marwah the army suffered 35% casualties.

Despite government efforts to control the narrative, offering supervised tours to journalists after a hasty cleanup, Brahma Chellaney, the Associated Press's South Asia correspondent, was the only foreign reporter who managed to stay on in Amritsar despite the media blackout. His dispatches, filed by telex, provided the first non-governmental news reports on the bloody operation in Amritsar. His first dispatch, front-paged by The New York Times, The Times of London and The Guardian, reported a death toll of at least 1200 from the complex alone, about twice of what authorities had admitted. According to the dispatch, about 780 militants and civilians and 400 troops had perished in fierce gun-battles. Chellaney reported that about "eight to ten" men suspected Sikh militants had been shot with their hands tied, and bodies carried off in garbage trucks for mass-cremation. In that dispatch, Mr. Chellaney interviewed a doctor who said he had been picked up by the army and forced to conduct postmortems despite the fact he had never done any postmortem examination before. In reaction to the dispatch, the Indian government charged Chellaney with violating Punjab press censorship, two counts of fanning sectarian hatred and trouble, and later with sedition, calling his report baseless and disputing his casualty figures. The government issued a warrant for his arrest, which the New York Times protesting vociferously, stating that Chellaney had been "doing his job too well". The Supreme Court of India ordered Chellaney to cooperate with Amritsar police, who interrogated him concerning his report and sources. Chellaney declined to reveal his source, citing journalistic ethics and the constitutional guarantee of freedom of the press. In September 1985 charges against Chellaney were dropped. The Associated Press stood by the accuracy of the reports and figures, which were "supported by Indian and other press accounts".

According to a close associate of Bhindranwale only 35 militants were killed, with the rest leaving in the early days of the Operation. They left because of a plan devised in which they would launch a revolution against the state to form Khalistan so the movement may live on. The belief of the militants was that it is better for some to live to fight another day. According to the associate all who left would go on to die in the Punjab Insurgency.

=== Independent estimates ===
Independent casualty figures were much higher. The Indian government said that the high civilian casualties was due to militants in the Golden Temple using pilgrims trapped inside the temple as human shields, though the operation was conducted at a time when the Golden Temple was packed to capacity with pilgrims who were there to celebrate the annual martyrdom anniversary of Guru Arjan Dev, the fifth Guru of the Sikhs. According to Indian army generals, "it is possible" that militants were "depending upon the Sikh masses to form a human shield to prevent action by the army," as well as the presence of a "whole lot of moderate Akali leadership."

Delivering the findings of a review in 2014, U.K. Foreign Secretary William Hague attributed high civilian casualties to the Indian Government's attempt at a full frontal assault on the militants, diverging from the recommendations provided by the U.K. Military. The Indian military had created a situation where civilians were allowed to collect inside of the temple complex. On 3 June the Indian military allowed pilgrims to enter the temple complex. The Indian military also allowed thousands of protestors whom were a part of the Dharam Yudh Morcha to enter the temple complex. These protestors included women and children. There was no warning provided to the pilgrims who entered on 3 June that a curfew was put in place by the military. These pilgrims were prevented from leaving after the curfew had been placed by the army at approximately 10:00 pm.

Sikhs residing in homes around the complex had also been victimized, as homes were looted and confiscated, with several residents bound by their own turbans and killed. Pilgrims and visitors to dozens of other gurdwaras across Punjab had also been trapped and killed as the operations radiated out from Amritsar. According to Inderjit Singh Jaijee, about 300 Hindu visitors to the complex from outside the state were also killed in the complex in volley fire.

=== Disposal of bodies ===
While fast, onsite mass cremations were impractical due to the number of dead, thick black clouds were witnessed near the Guru Nanak Niwas on 7 June. Bodies of the dead and dying were taken away often in municipal garbage vans, and mass-cremated surreptitiously. The government bribed and threatened local Dalit sweepers into handling the corpses, promising them possession of anything of value found on them.

== Aftermath ==
=== Release of the White Paper ===
Gandhi summoned small groups of high-profile Sikh intellectuals to assess reactions to June 1984. In efforts to manage potential personal and political fallout, the government released its official White Paper on 10 July 1984. Called "Operation Whitewash" by the press, an in some circles " White Paper on black deeds," it fully pushed the government's version of events, with a "welter of platitudes and unsubstantiated innuendo": solely blaming the Akalis for the course of events during the protest and evading Akali allegations of multiple withdrawals from agreements during talks by Indira Gandhi, while bureaucrats and lobbies ensured that nothing was said against any wing of the government in the paper; underreporting operation casualties; insinuating intrigues and foreign hands, though not substantiating them even slightly, "dismiss[ing them] with an air of high-sounding self-righteousness," failing to disclose that most captured weapons had been of Indian origin, a potential embarrassment to the army; and lashing out at the foreign press.

Another effort to seize the narrative, as the Sikh diaspora's rallies in North America and England, and contact with foreign press, ministers, and donors had become to gain traction into effective lobbying and human rights advocacy, was the mailing of approximately 50,000 copies of a videocassette in the mailboxes of North American Sikhs, attempting to rationalize the attack and the events leading up to it. "Unfortunately for India," according to Canadian journalists Zuheir Kashmeri and Brian McAndrew, authors of Soft Target, "the quality of the tapes was poor. Careless editing revealed several phony segments.... Accompanying the approximately fifty thousand cassettes was a glossy magazine entitled "The Sikhs in Their Homeland—India," which praised Sikhs' contributions to India and denounced the evil separatists, especially those outside India."

In September 1985, the government also banned a report by Citizens for Democracy, Oppression in Punjab, arrested two people involved in putting it out, co-author B. D. Pancholi and press owner Om Prakash Gupta, and seized and destroyed copies of the report due to the "sensitive situation in the state", just prior to state elections. The work, with a foreword by Justice V. M. Tarkunde, charged the government as the major cause of violence in Punjab during the Dharam Yudh Morcha, and opposition to the Congress charged the government with suppression of political dissent and "sustained attempts to suppress the civil rights of the people". tarkunde and four other co-authors were charged with sedition, but not arrested. Civil liberties activists who worked for the overturn of the ban were criticized by the government for naming and therefore "endangering the lives" of government officials who orchestrated anti-Sikh violence and in their reports. The report asserted that "clearly innocent" people had been arrested, and the state police had carried out "sadistic torture, ruthless killings, fake encounters, calculated ill treatment of women and children, and corruption and graft on a large scale".

=== Reconstruction controversy ===
The Akal Takht, the holiest of the five Sikh takhts, was razed to the ground during the operation, and many holy relics destroyed. An old rallying point and symbol of resistance by armed force, and where the sixth Sikh guru had first raised an army to fight the Mughals, it had last been razed in 1764 by Ahmad Shah Abdali. The sanctum sanctorum of the Golden Temple had also received numerous bullet marks.

The government's unilateral appointment of the Buddha Dal nihang faction, which was not on good terms with the mainstream Sikh priesthood, to oversee the repair of the Akal Takht, instead of leaving it to the SGPC, further aroused ire and resentment of the Sikh masses. Its leader, Buta Singh, was seen as complicit by accepting tainted external funding and patronage by the central government for the repair, rather than relying on community self-funding and kar seva favored by Sikh tradition. He had discouraged participation at a conference of the Golden Temple's granthis, who had strongly opposed him and would instead hold it at another historic gurdwara in Amritsar, as they were barred by the government from doing so at the Golden Temple. The government would attempt to downplay the success of this World Sikh Conference, while asking the media to inflate the attendance of Buta Singh's own 11 August 1984 convention, which would censure the SGPC and the Akalis. The reconstructed Akal Takht was torn down and rebuilt by the community and its donations, under the supervision of the Damdami Taksal and Thakar Singh Bhindranwale, Jarnail Singh's successor. Some Sikhs wanted to leave the Akal Takht in ruins, as a testament to the government's actions.

=== Operation Woodrose ===
In the wake of Operation Blue Star, Punjab had become the target of another operation, Operation Woodrose, this time targeting the countryside, which was swarmed with soldiers ordered to approach identifiable Sikhs as enemies and conduct cordon operations, mass arrests, torture, sexual harassment and assaults, and disappearances, traumatizing and antagonizing tens of thousands.

=== Assassinations ===
The operation also led to the assassination of Prime Minister Indira Gandhi on 31 October 1984 by two of her Sikh bodyguards as an act of vengeance, triggering the 1984 Sikh massacre. The widespread killing of Sikhs, principally in the national capital Delhi but also in other major cities in North India, led to major divisions between the Sikh community and the Indian Government. The army withdrew from Harmandir Sahib later in 1984 under pressure from Sikh demands. The 1985 bombing of Air India Flight 182 is thought to have been a revenge action.

General Arun Shridhar Vaidya, the Chief of Army Staff at the time of Operation Blue Star, was assassinated in 1986 in Pune by two Sikhs, Harjinder Singh Jinda and Sukhdev Singh Sukha. Both were sentenced to death, and hanged on 7 October 1992.

In March 1986, Sikh militants again occupied and continued to use the temple compound which necessitated another police action known as Operation Black Thunder on 1 May 1986, Indian paramilitary police entered the temple and arrested 200 militants that had occupied Harmandir Sahib for more than three months. On 2 May 1986 the paramilitary police undertook a 12-hour operation to take control of Harmandir Sahib at Amritsar from several hundred militants, but almost all the major radical leaders managed to escape. In June 1990, the Indian government ordered the area surrounding the temple to be vacated by local residents in order to prevent militants activity around the temple.

=== Long term effects ===
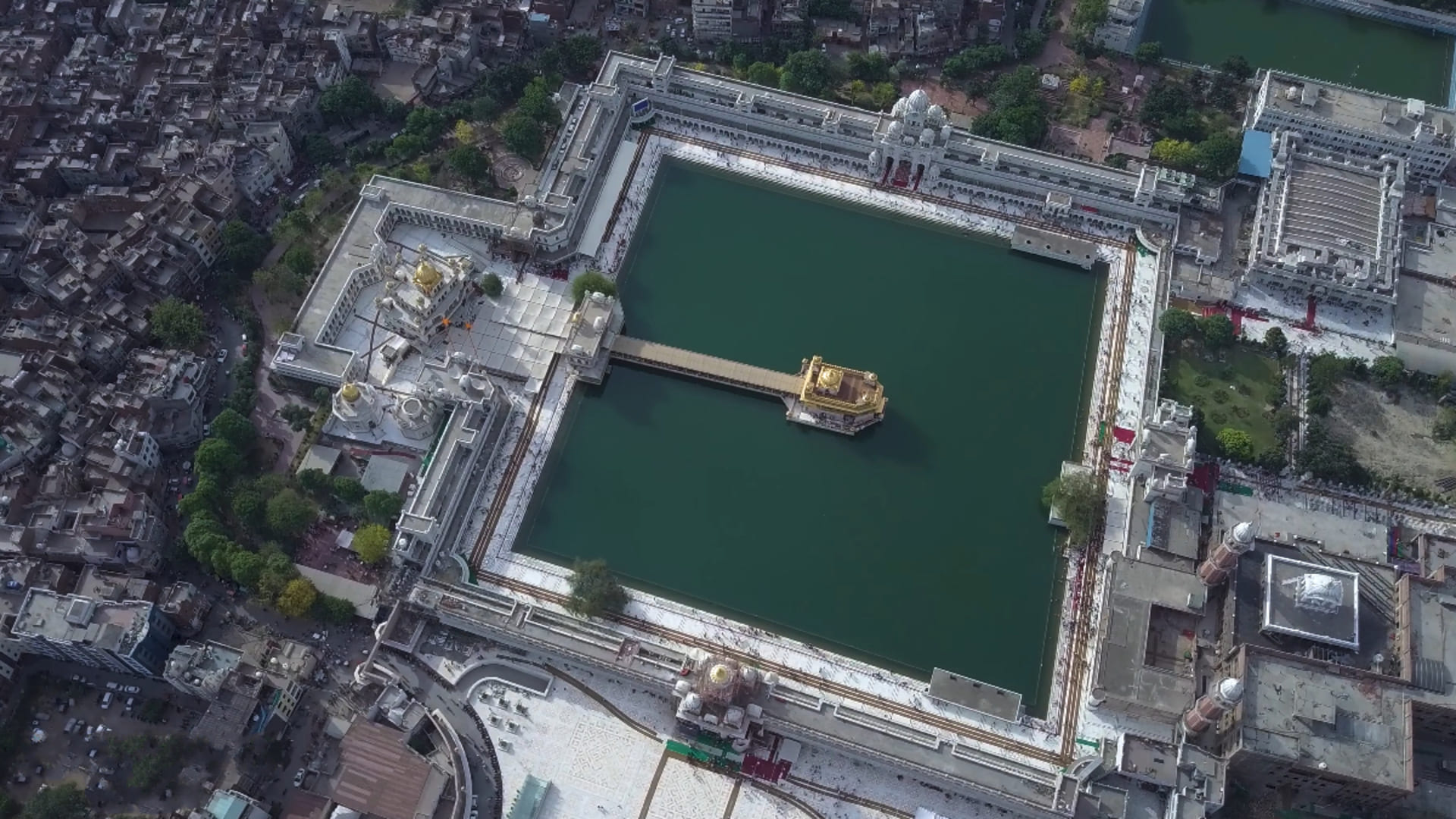
Aerial view of the Galliara park around the complex

The long-term results of the operation included:

1. Intended to end the insurgency, the operation had the opposite effect, with attacks escalating. There was more violence in Punjab after Operation Blue Star than prior. Official estimates of the combined number of civilians, police, and terrorists killed increased from 27 in 1981, 20 in 1982, and 88 in 1983 to more than one thousand per year from 1987 to 1992. The operation would "prove a disaster" on multiple fronts, and the execution and Blue Star and the subsequent Operation Woodrose would generate a chain of events that would fundamentally change the nature of the relationship between the Sikh community and the Indian government by undermining their faith in government institutions and their ability to assure justice and dignity within the polity.
2. Outraging Sikhs all over India, with most finding it unacceptable that the armed forces had desecrated the Golden Temple, thousands of young men joined the Khalistan movement, with "organized insurgency not taking root in Punjab until after the operation." Sikhs became outraged with the military action in the bastion of Sikhi that provoked a wave of deep anguish, long-term resentment, and feelings of betrayal and alienation; this community consternation that would majorly intensify the militancy. Bhindranwale's views regarding the government acquired significant credibility in the community afterwards, and as the operation's only ostensible achievement was the deaths of Bhindranwale and a few associated figures, his absence, the detainment of the Akalis, and troop conduct would channel Sikh anger and leave the field "wide open" for entry into militancy, as well as the formation of panthic committees to steer it.
3. The operation inflamed tensions in Punjab, though independence would only be declared by a Sarbat Khalsa in 1986, as 500,000 deployed Indian troops operated violently in Punjab, causing thousands of Sikh deaths between 1984 and 1992.

Following the operation the central government demolished hundreds of houses and created a corridor around the compound called "Galliara" (also spelled Galiara or Galyara) for security reasons, intended to remove the narrow lanes and bazaars that had been a major hindrance for the army during the operation. This was made into a public park and opened in June 1988. Describing the operation as "hardly worth the game", as the bulk of militants escaped through the many lanes and by-lanes around the complex, remaining unsecured due to poor reconnaissance.

== Criticisms ==
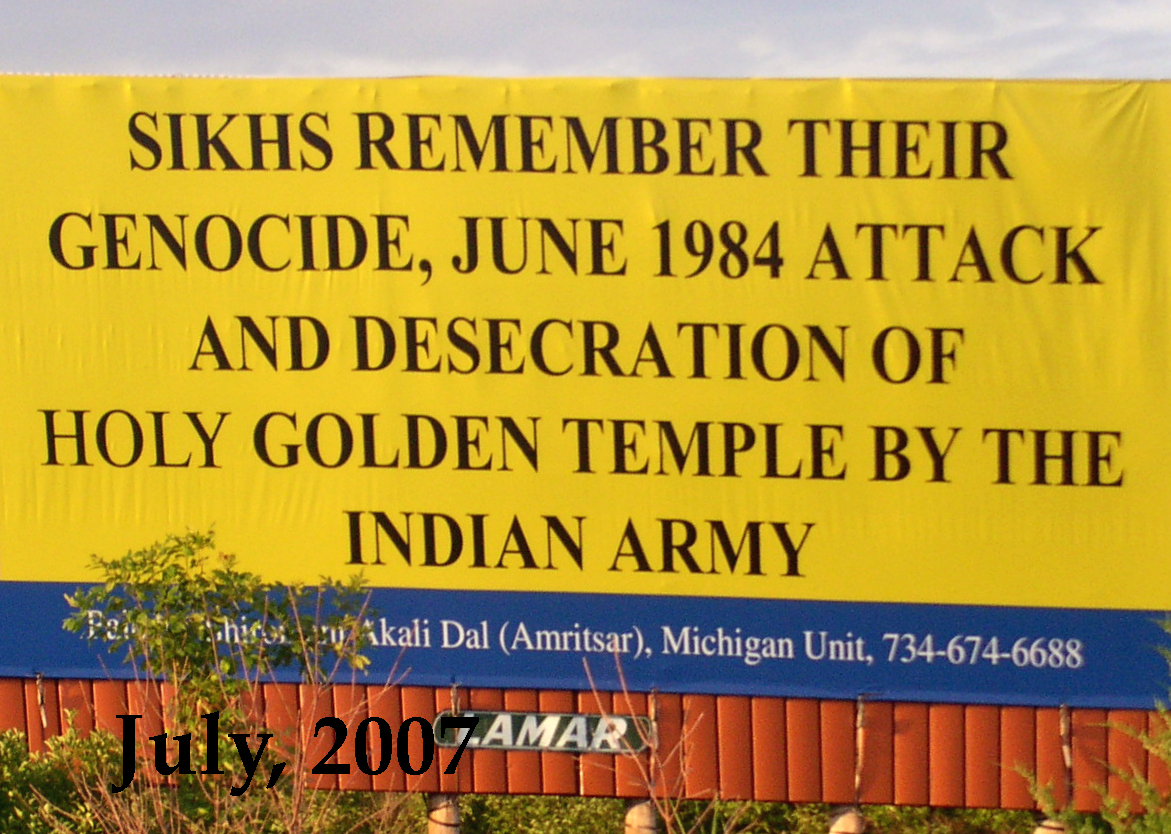
Memorial plaque commemorating the victims of Operation Blue Star

The operation has been criticized on several grounds including: its motivations, the government's choice of timing for the attack, the heavy casualties, the loss of property, and human rights violations.

According to G. K. C. Reddy,

"'Operation Blue Star' will go down in history as one of the biggest massacre[s] of unarmed civilians by the organised military force of a nation. The word unarmed is used deliberately as the disparity in arms on the two sides was so great that those resisting army invasion of the Temple could hardly be termed as armed."

According to Joyce Pettigrew,

"The army went into Darbar Sahib not to eliminate a political figure or a political movement but to suppress the culture of a people, to attack their heart, to strike a blow at their spirit and self-confidence."

=== Timing ===
According to human rights lawyer Ram Narayan Kumar,

"The Operation Blue Star was not only envisioned and rehearsed in advance, meticulously and in total secrecy, it also aimed at obtaining maximum number of Sikh victims, largely devout pilgrims unconnected with the [ Dharam Yudh Morcha ] political agitation."

Operation Blue Star was planned on a Sikh religious day—the martyrdom day of Guru Arjan Dev, the founder of the Harmandir Sahib. Sikhs from all over the world visit the temple on this day. Many Sikhs view the timing and attack by the army as an attempt to inflict maximum casualties on Sikhs and demoralize them, and the government is in turn blamed for the inflated number of civilian casualties by choosing to attack on that day. Additionally, Longowal had announced the Grain Roko Morcha, a statewide civil disobedience movement that would launch on 3 June 1984. Participants planned to block the flow of grain out of Punjab and refuse to pay land revenue, water and electricity bills.

When asked about why the army entered the temple premises just after Guru Arjan Dev's martyrdom day (when the number of devotees is much higher), General Brar said that it was just a coincidence and that while he could not "comment on the inside of politics", he "assume[d] that after taking everything into consideration, the prime minister and the government decided this was the only course of action left," with "perhaps" the army having only had three to four days to complete the operation. Based on "some sort of information", Bhindranwale was planning to declare Khalistan an independent country any moment with "a strong possibility" of support from Pakistan, and "Khalistani currency had already been distributed." This declaration "might" have increased chances of "large sections" of Punjab Police and security personnel siding with Bhindranwale; as "if there could be desertions in the army, then the police, who were in Punjab, who were privy to Bhindranwale's speeches, might have [also deserted]," as "they were also emotionally charged by what was happening". The army waited for the surrender of militants on the night of 5 June but the surrender did not happen. The operation had to be completed before dawn. Otherwise, exaggerated messages of army besieging the temple would have attracted mobs from nearby villages to the temple premises. The army could not have fired upon these civilians. More importantly, Pakistan would have come in the picture, declaring its support for Khalistan. He described the operation as traumatic and painful, but necessary.

=== Media censorship ===
Before the attack by the army, a media blackout was imposed in Punjab. The Times reporter Michael Hamlyn reported that journalists were picked up from their hotels at 5 am in a military bus, taken to the adjoining border of the state of Haryana and "were abandoned there". The main towns in Punjab were put under curfew, transportation was banned, a news blackout was imposed, and Punjab was "cut off from the outside world". A group of journalists who later tried to drive into Punjab were stopped at the road block at Punjab border and were threatened with being shot if they proceeded. Indian nationals who worked with the foreign media also were banned from the area. The press criticized these actions by government as an "obvious attempt to attack the temple without the eyes of the foreign press on them". The media blackout throughout Punjab resulted in spread of rumours. The only available source of information during the period was All India Radio and the Doordarshan channel.

The confusion and chaos was exacerbated by the government disabling normal channels of information during the operation. As the army had taken over control of the state apparatus since the beginning of the month, all accredited reporters and correspondents, both foreign and domestic, were asked to leave.

=== Conduct ===
==== Sikh militants ====
The government issued White Paper alleged that on June 6, a group of some 350 people, including Longowal and Tohra surrendered to the army near the Guru Nanak Niwas. The White Paper further alleged that to prevent the surrender, the militants opened fire and threw grenades at the group resulting in the deaths of 70 people, including 30 women and 5 children. However, neither Bhan Singh nor Longowal during their recounting of the events that took place on June 6 made any reference to either surrendering to the military or an attack on civilians by the militants.

The government issued White Paper alleged that on 8 June 1984, an unarmed army doctor was abducted by the militants and was hacked to death. However, Giani Puran Singh who was called by the military to act as a mediator to facilitate the surrender of four militants in the basement of the Bunga Jassa Singh Ramgharia, stated that the "so called doctor" had been killed along with two other army personnel when they ventured close to the militant's hiding place.

==== Indian Army ====
Former Indian Service Officer Ramesh Inder Singh, the then Deputy Commissioner (DC) of Amritsar in one of his interview with BBC said that even the Governor of (Indian) Punjab did not know that there would be military action and he indicated that the Operation was badly carried out and panic among foot soldiers was so evident that they were formalizing their plans on the bonnets of their vehicles.

Similar accusations of highhandedness by the army and allegations of human rights violations by security forces in Operation Blue Star and subsequent military operations in Punjab have been leveled by Justice V. M. Tarkunde, Mary Anne Weaver, human rights lawyer Ram Narayan Kumar, and anthropologists Cynthia Mahmood and Joyce Pettigrew.

Some of the human rights abuses alleged to have been committed by the Indian army were:

- In April 2017 Justice Gurbir Singh stated that the army's failure to provide any announcement to pilgrims before commencing Operation Blue Star was a human rights violation.
- The Indian army mistreated pilgrims who were detained immediately after the fighting stopped on June 6 by failing to provide them any water. Some pilgrims were reduced to collecting drinking water from the canals that contained dead bodies and were filled with blood.
- Ragi Harcharan Singh stated that on June 6 the Indian army gave its first announcement for evacuation since the commencement of Operation Blue Star. Singh states that he witnessed hundreds of pilgrims, including women, being shot at by the army as they emerged from hiding.
- A female survivor witnessed Indian soldiers line up Sikh men in a queue, tie their arms behind their backs with their turbans, beat them with rifle butts until they bled and then executed by being shot.
- Giana Puran Singh stated he along with 3–4 others were used as human shields for the protection of an officer who wanted to inspect the inside of the Darbar Sahib for anyone using a machine gun.
- A member of the AISSF stated that on June 6 those who surrendered before the army were made to lie down on the hot road, interrogated, made to move on their knees, bit with rifle butts and kicked with boots on private parts and their heads. The detainees were made to have their arms tied behind their backs with their own turbans and denied water. At about 7:00 pm the detainees were made to sit on the Parikrama near the army tanks. Many were injured as there was still firing from the side of the Akal Takht.
- Post-mortem reports showed that most of the dead bodies had their hands tied behind their backs, implying they had died after the army assault and not during. These bodies were in a putrid state at the time of post-mortem as they had been exposed in the open for 72 hours before being brought in.
- The Red Cross was stopped from aiding the wounded civilians by the army.
- Punjab officials who visited after the Operation complained to the army of 6 cases of rape during the Operation by soldiers that they had heard of.

The Indian Army responded to this criticism by stating that they "answered the call of duty as disciplined, loyal and dedicated members of the Armed Forces of India. ... our loyalties are to the nation, the armed forces to which we belong, the uniforms we wear and to the troops we command".

===== Alcohol provisioning =====
Soldiers, having free rein, had trampled through the complex with their shoes on, smoking, and roughly mistreating the pilgrims trapped inside. After the operation, it was noted by Tully and Jacob that: "The army certainly had plenty of drink available. A notification of the Government of Punjab's Department of Excise and Taxation allowed for the provision of 700,000 quart bottles of rum, 30,000 quart bottles of whisky, 60,000 quart bottles of brandy and 160,000 bottles of beer, all free of excise duty ... 'for consumption by the Armed Forces Personnel deployed in Operation Blue Star.'"

===== Looting =====
The premises had also reportedly been stripped of all possible valuables, from donation boxes to kitchen utensils from the complex's langar.

According to Jamwal, troops of the 26th Battalion of the Madras Regiment had engaged in looting the premises. The commanding officer was "severely admonished" by Jamwal and ordered to have the loot returned.

===== Honours to the soldiers =====
The soldiers and generals involved in the Operation were presented with gallantry awards, honours, decoration strips and promotions by the Indian president Zail Singh, a Sikh, in a ceremony conducted on 10 July 1985. The act was criticized by authors and activists such as Harjinder Singh Dilgeer, who accused the troops of human rights violations during the operation.

=== Strategy ===
Blue Star encompassed 41 other gurdwaras all over Punjab in which more than 3 army divisions were deployed. As later events conclusively proved, the operations was not only flawed in its very concept but marred by poor planning and execution. According to Khushwant Singh,

"As far as the competence of the Army the less said the better. In an age where a handful of Israeli or German commandos could, through a well-planned action overcome a well-entrenched enemy thousands of miles away from them, the best our generals could do was to storm the Temple complex with tanks and armoured cars, blast the Akal Takht to get at Bhindranwale and 200 of his men. In crossfire upwards of 5,000 people, a majority of them pilgrims, including women and children, lost their lives.... Far from doing a competent job, our army commanders botched up a simple operation."

As reported by Indian Army Major General Afsir Karim, among the main factors of planning and conduct which aggravated the impact of this operation, the foremost decision was to launch the assault on the day of the martyrdom day of Guru Arjan, the builder of the temple, described as "sheer perversity", as a large number of pilgrims were bound to be injured and killed. The date being chosen for its surprise factor, or the presence of pilgrims potentially preventing the militants from responding, showed "cynical disregard" for innocent lives, with "neither good soldiering nor honourable combat" on the part of the senior generals in charge of planning the operation. They would later "make various statements, invent excuses, and shade the truth to hide inconvenient facts". The incompetence resulting in the burning of the Sikh Reference Library was taken as "vengeful vandalism" by the Sikh masses. The additional Army action of Operation Woodrose, where 37 other gurdwaras were subjected to a combing operation, also put the Sikhs on notice and created an atmosphere of terror, widening the scope of the conflict.

There was "little doubt", according to Karim, that it was the operation, because of its lasting adverse effects on the Sikh masses, which put a majority of unemployed Sikh youth, disadvantaged by the economic results of the Green Revolution that the Dharam Yudh Morcha had been launched to ameliorate through the implementation of the Anandpur Sahib Resolution, on the road to insurgency. After the operation a large number crossed the border for training and weaponry, as an operation where "thousands of Sikh youth were humiliated, harassed, and physically hurt was bound to intensify the conflict." Previously the conflict had been limited to a few radical groups and scattered, small-scale incidents; after, it affected all of Punjab, with "organized insurgency not taking root in Punjab until after the operation."

==== Planning ====
The military operation was a disastrous political decision and severely bungled; Lt. Gen. S. K. Sinha would later characterize the operation as both a political and military blunder, and would cite Sundarji as flouting standard operating procedure laid out by Sinha, seeking army promotion, and to impress Indira Gandhi, who wanted to appear politically strong to her electorate after frustrations in Kashmir. He would also ascribe his dismissal by Gandhi to his attempts to present his views of the Akali problem, and his long personal friendships with Akalis, which he believed irritated Gandhi.

According to retired Lt. Gen. Shankar Prasad, "It was because of the disasters called Vaidya [who superseded Sinha] and Sundarji—who did not have the brains to pick on the plans left behind by Lt Gen. S.K. Sinha—that we had both a political folly compounded by a military botch-up." He would blame Sundarji more for the operation than Vaidya, who he says "was taken in by Sundarji's swagger," and that both "were being politically subservient to the Prime Minister... maybe they wanted governorships or ambassadorships after serving their time." Prasad also believed that the military high command should have refused to implement the order, and craft a more suitable operation in its place, instead of being pressured by deadlines from the political leadership.

Maj. Gen. Jamwal would also criticize Brar, calling the operation "badly and hastily planned and executed", having opined to Brar prior to the operation, and contending that Brar's frontal assault had played to the advantage of the fighters in the complex, who rendered the 10th Guards unable to advance. Jamwal had also warned that even as Brar insisted on the direct orders of Sundarji, "that when things will go wrong, it will be your neck in the noose not that of Lt Gen Sundarji's." Upon these revelations in the press, Brar would diminish Jamwal as a "bitter, jealous man" who had "obviously something lacking" to not be promoted past Major General.

==== Tactics ====
In the UK cabinet secretary's report, contrary to the advice of a British military advisor in February 1984 of surgical strike involving a helicopter-borne commando operation had advised in February 1984, the Indian Army went into the temple "sledgehammer-style", with massive casualties of civilians. The assault on the Golden Temple would be later recognized as a major blunder on the part of the central government even by Congress leaders.

=== British involvement ===
The accidental release of secret documents in the United Kingdom in 2014, after the 30-year rule, revealed that the Thatcher government was aware of the Indian government's intention to storm the temple and that a SAS officer was tasked to advise the Indian authorities on it, with the communications between Gandhi and Thatcher dated to February 1984, four months before the reportedly urgent and unavoidable Army action. According to a report by the Sikh Federation of UK, India was one of the biggest purchasers of military equipment for UK between 1981 and 1990. Most of the Foreign Office's documents on India from 1984 are classified in whole or in part.

== See also ==
- Kharku
- Khalistan movement
- Golden Temple
