= Sikhism in Jammu and Kashmir =

Religious belief in Jammu and Kashmir

The Sikh population in Jammu and Kashmir consists of native residents and communities originating from Punjab who later migrated to the region, especially during the period of Maharaja Ranjit Singh. There are also descendants of Kashmiri Pandits and Muslims who were initiated to Sikhism.

== Origins ==
The Sikhs of Kashmir, or Kashmiri Sikhs are believed to be residing in Kashmir since the first visit of Guru Nanak Dev in 1518. Later during the propagation of Sikh religion under subsequent Gurus, and their visits to Kashmir, a considerable population of Sikhs flourished there. During the Sikh rule, Maharaja Ranjit Singh also settled a huge number of Sikhs in Kashmir. These Sikhs predominantly speak Pahari Punjabi, which exhibits a distinct regional dialect, setting it apart from the Punjabi dialect spoken in Punjab itself.

== History ==
Sikhs have a historical presence in Jammu and Kashmir, with their roots dating back several centuries. The forebears of the Sikh community in the valley were natives to the areas of Poonch, Pothohar, Rawalpindi, Muzaffarabad, and Kashmir. These early Sikh settlers represented a diverse range of castes, primarily Saraswat Brahmin clans, including Dutt, Sasan, Sudan, Sadiwal, Raina/Reen, Ishar/Issar, Bali, and others. During the reign of Maharaja Ranjit Singh in the early 19th century, there was a migration of Sikhs from Punjab to Jammu and Kashmir. These Sikh migrants included Lubanas, Jatts (primarily Chahals, Deols, and Sandhus), Khatris (predominantly Chawlas).

In 1984, 1986 and 1989 there were riots by Hindus against Sikhs in Jammu and surrounding areas. Since the 1990s, there had been persecution of Sikhs by Islamic militia as well, though most Kashmiri Sikhs have not migrated out of Kashmir.

== Demography ==
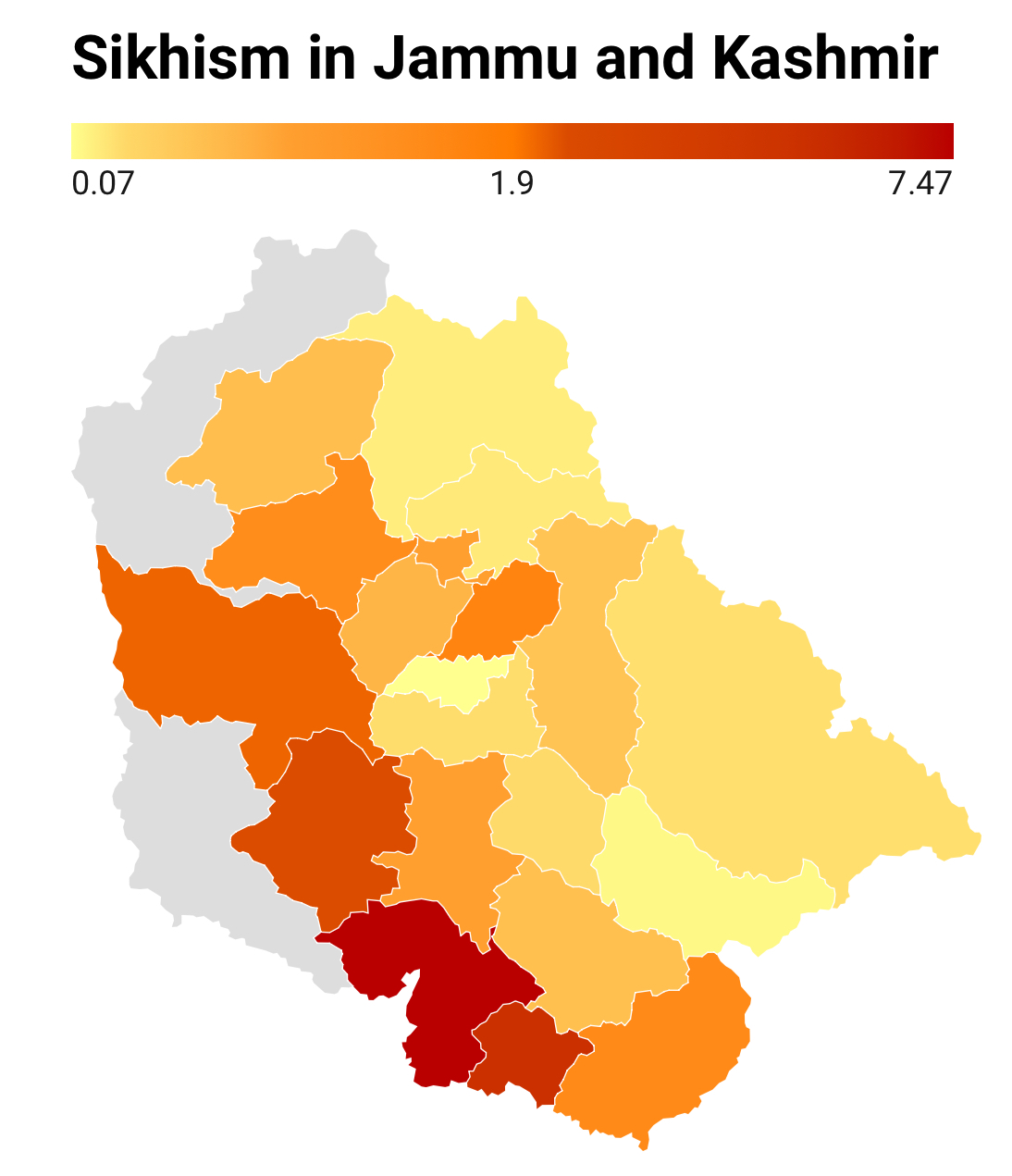
Sikhism percent in Jammu and Kashmir by district, 2011 census

In the 1951 census, the Punjabi-speaking community in Kashmir, which included both Sikhs and Hindus, numbered 1,827,971 individuals, accounting for approximately 40 percent or two out of every five people in the total recorded population of 4.6 million for the entire Kashmir region. However, there has been a consistent decrease in the Punjabi-speaking population, especially among the Sikh community, in Jammu and Kashmir since that time. According to the 2021 estimates, the Sikh population stands at 234,848 individuals, while the Hindu population is recorded at 3,566,674.

The Sikh population in Jammu and Kashmir is estimated to be between 100,000 (as reported by The Hindu on February 13, 1998) and 180,000 (as reported by The Tribune on October 4, 1998). This Sikh population constitutes approximately 1.3 percent of the overall population, which stands at 13 million (as per Kashmir.net, no specific date provided). According to The Tribune, a newspaper based in Chandigarh, the Sikh community in Jammu and Kashmir faces divisions due to the proliferation of community organizations, with a recent example being the split between the J&K Akali Dal and the Gurdwara Prabandhak Board (reported on October 4, 1998).

== Notable people ==
- Banda Singh Bahadur, a Sikh leader who led significant military campaigns against the Mughal Empire in the early 18th century.
- Akali Kaur Singh Nihang - Kaur Singh (formerly recognized as Puran Singh) stood as a distinguished figure among the prominent Sikh individuals of Jammu and Kashmir, renowned for his contributions as a religious preacher and scholar. He authored notable works such as Guru Shabad Ratan Prakash and various other literary endeavors.

== Religious institutions ==
Jammu and Kashmir is home to several historic and significant Sikh gurdwaras (places of worship), including the Chatti Patshahi Gurdwara in Srinagar and the Gurdwara Shri Guru Nanak Dev Ji in Jammu. These gurdwaras are not only places of worship but also centers of community and cultural activities for the Sikh population.
