= Timeline of the Air India Flight 182 affair =

On 23 June 1985, bombings of Air India Flight 182 and Narita Airport (the latter intended to simultaneously destroy Air India Flight 301, at altitude), resulted in the deaths of 331 people, of whom 268 were Canadian citizens. The bombings, which started with suitcase bombs being checked onto a pair of Canadian Pacific Airlines flights originating at Vancouver International Airport that day, was perpetrated by Canadian citizens who were members of Babbar Khalsa, a Sikh terrorist group. The mass murders launched several investigations, inquiries and trials. The botched trial of two of the perpetrators, Malik and Bagri, is known as the Air India Trial; events relating to the incident are listed below in chronological order.

- July 1985 – Canadian Prime Minister Brian Mulroney calls Indian Prime Minister Rajiv Gandhi to offer his condolences, but does not call the victims' families to do the same. This causes an uproar among Indo-Canadians who feel that although this is the deadliest terrorist act to date, it is not taken seriously because the victims although mostly Canadian were not Caucasian.
- 8 November 1985 – The RCMP charge Talwinder Singh Parmar and Inderjit Singh Reyat with weapons, explosives and conspiracy offenses after a raid on their homes. Reyat is convicted of the weapons offence and receives a fine of $2,000. Because of a lack of evidence, the charges against Parmar are dropped and no link to Air India is established.
- 22 January 1986 – The Canadian Aviation Safety Board determines that a bomb was responsible for bringing down Air India 182.
- 4 February 1986 – The Indian Government's Kirpal Commission of Inquiry reaches the same conclusion as the Canadian Aviation Safety Board.
- February 1988 – Inderjit Singh Reyat is arrested by West Midlands Police in Coventry, UK.
- 8 December 1989 – Following a lengthy court battle the British government agrees to extradite Reyat, who is a dual British-Canadian national, to Canada.
- 10 May 1991 – Inderjit Singh Reyat receives a ten-year sentence after being convicted of two counts of manslaughter and four explosives charges relating to the Narita Airport bombing.
- 9 to 15 October 1992 – Talwinder Singh Parmar interrogated by Punjab Police; apparently names Lakhbir Singh Rode as mastermind, and confesses to supplying the dynamite for the operation. The confession is destroyed, since Lakhbir is said to have been an Indian agent.
- 15 October 1992 – Talwinder Singh Parmar is reportedly killed by Indian Police during a gun battle in the village of Kang Arian in Punjab.
- 27 October 2000 – Ripudaman Singh Malik and Ajaib Singh Bagri are arrested by the RCMP. They are charged with 329 counts of first-degree murder in the deaths of the people on board Air India Flight 182, conspiracy to commit murder, the attempted murder of passengers and crew on the Canadian Pacific flight at New Tokyo International Airport, and two counts of murder of the baggage handlers at New Tokyo International Airport.
- 4 June 2001 – The British government gives Canada permission to charge Inderjit Singh Reyat in connection with the bombings.
- 6 June 2001 – Inderjit Singh Reyat is arrested by the RCMP facing charges of murder, attempted murder, and conspiracy in the Air India bombing.
- 10 February 2003 – Reyat pleads guilty to one count of manslaughter and a charge of aiding in the construction of a bomb. He was sentenced to five years in jail. At the time he was expected to provide testimony in the trial of Malik and Bagri but later claimed he couldn't remember.
- April 2003 – The trial of Malik and Bagri begins after being delayed by pre-trial motions and problems with defence counsel.
- 18 May 2004 – The Crown prosecution rests its case in the trial of Malik and Bagri after calling 80 witnesses.
- 31 May 2004 – Malik and Bagri's defence begins.
- 19 October 2004 – Closing arguments begin.
- 4 December 2004 – The judge presiding over the 'Air India Trial', Justice Ian Josephson, says the verdict will be delivered on 16 March 2005.
- 16 March 2005 – Justice Ian Josephson delivers the verdict for Ripudaman Singh Malik and Ajaib Singh Bagri: Not guilty on all counts.

I began by describing the horrific nature of these cruel acts of terrorism, acts which cry out for justice. Justice is not achieved, however, if persons are convicted on anything less than the requisite standard of proof beyond a reasonable doubt. Despite what appear to have been the best and most earnest of efforts by the police and the Crown, the evidence has fallen markedly short of that standard.

- 7 May 2005 Gurmant Grewal, M.P. tables a Motion in the House of Commons for the Air India Bombing Investigation. Gurmant Grewal on Supply | openparliament.ca
- 26 July 2007 The investigative magazine, Tehelka, releases reports that a retired police officer has maintained records of Parmar's confession identifying the mastermind as Lakhbir Singh Rode. Most of the confession is already known to RCMP, and the new aspects appear dubious.
- 14 April 2008 National Geographic Channel in the UK broadcast an Air Crash Investigation episode (Explosive Evidence) about Air India Flight 182.
- 18 September 2010 – Inderjit Singh Reyat is found guilty of perjury in the Air India Trial.
- 7 January 2011 – Reyat is sentenced to nine years imprisonment.
- 25 January 2013 – Reyat appeals his sentence to the Canadian Supreme Court; the appeal is rejected.
