= Hardial Singh Johal =

A chief engineer for the Vancouver School Board, Hardial Singh Johal was an avid follower of Talwinder Singh Parmar, and thus closely eyed in the investigation following the bombing of Air India Flight 182. He was alleged to have stored the suitcase explosives in the basement of a Vancouver school, and to have purchased the tickets for the flights on which the bombs were placed.

Moments after a wiretapped phonecall with Parmar on June 20, 1985, a man phoned Canadian Pacific Airlines where he spoke to ticket agent Martine Donahue, and purchased two tickets - one for a "Mohinderbel Singh" for Air India Flight 301 from Tokyo, and another under the name of "Jaswand Singh" for CP Air Flight 086, which was connecting to the Air India flight. The contact phone number left with the ticket agent became one of the first leads tracked by investigators, and was owned by Johal.

The initial phone conversation, as translated, included the following exchange;

Parmar: Did he write the story?
Johal: No he didn't.
Parmar: Do that work first.

It is believed that "writing the story" referred to purchasing the tickets for the flight, and after the tickets were purchased, Johal phoned Parmar back and asked if he could "come over and read the story he asked for", to which Parmar agreed.

In the documentary Air India 182 Mandip Singh Grewal, the son of Air India 182 victim Dajlit Singh Grewal, stated that he and his family met Johal at Vancouver International Airport on the day that his father departed for the flight connecting to Air India 182.

Johal's house was raided by the Royal Canadian Mounted Police (RCMP) on November 6, 1985 along with the residences of Talwinder Singh Parmar, Inderjit Singh Reyat, Surjan Singh Gill and Manmohan Singh.

On November 15, 2002, Johal died of natural causes at the age of 55.
