= Air India 182 (film) =

2008 documentary film directed by Sturla Gunnarsson

- Directed by: Sturla Gunnarsson
- Produced by: Sturla Gunnarsson; David York
- Cinematography: Kirk Tougas; Tony Westman
- Edited by: Nick Hector
- Music by: Jonathan Goldsmith
- Production company: 52 Media
- Distributed by: Canadian Broadcasting Corporation; 52 Media
- Release date: April 17, 2008 (HotDocs)
- Running time: 97 minutes
- Country: Canada
- Language: English

Air India 182 is a 2008 documentary directed by Sturla Gunnarsson, and produced by David York. It is about the Air India Flight 182 bombing in 1985. The Canadian Broadcasting Corporation commissioned the film, which originally had the preliminary title Flight 182. Gunarsson stated that he hoped the film would cause Canadians to contemplate domestic terrorism.

The film includes interviews from family members of the deceased, and other figures, including Ujjal Dosanjh, Eisha Marjara, Lata Pada, and Renée Sarojini Saklikar. One of the associate producers, Judy Koonar, is Gunarsson's wife and of Punjabi origin. The color white represents death in the Indian cultures, so the interviews were screened on a white background. The film also incorporates transcripts, re-enactments, and documents related to the case.

The film premiered at the Hot Docs Canadian International Documentary Festival in April 2008, and in June of that year it was screened at the Vancity Theatre in Vancouver. Dave Hayer attended the Vancouver screening. The CBC planned to air the documentary on June 22 with no commercials.

Gunarsson argued that there were Sikh victims and therefore, as paraphrased by Charlie Smith of The Georgia Straight, "this wasn't a case of Sikhs attacking Hindus, because there were Sikh passengers." Smith argued that the conclusion about the sectarian nature was opposite of that made by The Sorrow and the Terror: The Haunting Legacy of the Air India Tragedy.

== Cast ==
- Gurpreet Singh Chana – Inderjit Singh Reyat
- Baljinder Singh – Talwinder Singh Parmar
- Sarabjeet Singh – Hardial Singh Johal
- Ankush Kapoor – Surjan Singh Gill
- Rodney Ahluwalia – Rupudaman Singh Malik
- Justin Ward – Michael "Mike" Quinn (air traffic controller at Shannon Airport)
- Adam D. Millard – Doug Henderson
- Jodie Graham – Ray Kobze

Amateur actors play the victims and family members.

== Reception ==
Monika Bartyzel of Moviefone wrote that the recreations added to the film because they "keep the story clear" and add "tangible [scenes that make the film] real". She added that the scenes "[allow the audience] to become more intimately familiar with each person – terrorist, victim, and official – in a way that flushes out their stories."

The film was shortlisted for the Donald Brittain Award for Best Social or Political Documentary and won the Best Documentary Editing Award at the 24th Gemini Awards and the inaugural Director's Guild of Canada's Allan King Award for Excellence in Documentary in 2009.
