= Tara Singh Hayer =

Canadian journalist (1936–1998)

Tara Singh Hayer OBC
- Born: November 15, 1936; Paddi Jagir, Punjab, British India
- Died: November 18, 1998 (aged 62); Surrey, British Columbia, Canada
- Cause of death: Assassination by shooting
- Occupation: Newspaper publisher
- Known for: Founding the Indo-Canadian Times; and being the first journalist in Canada killed for their work
- Spouse: Baldev Kaur
- Children: 4, including Dave
- Awards: Order of British Columbia; Commemorative Medal for the 125th Anniversary of Canada

Tara Singh Hayer OBC (November 15, 1936 – November 18, 1998) was an Indian-Canadian newspaper publisher and editor who was murdered after his outspoken criticism of fundamentalist violence and terrorism. In particular, he was a key witness in the trial of the Air India Flight 182 bombing.

Hayer was the founder of the Indo-Canadian Times, the largest and oldest Punjabi-language weekly newspaper in Canada and the leading Punjabi-language newspaper in North America. The paper—distributed in Canada, the United States, and England—was regularly used by Hayer to speak out against violent extremist groups.

He is the first, and one of the few journalists in Canada, to have been killed specifically for his work.

== History ==
=== Personal life ===
Hayer was born in Paddi Jagir, a small village in Punjab, India. He emigrated to Canada in 1970, where he worked as a miner, teacher, truck driver, manager of a trucking firm, and journalist before establishing a community newspaper, the Indo-Canadian Times, in 1978. He is the father of Surrey MLA Dave Hayer.

=== Publishing career ===
Hayer established a community newspaper, the Indo-Canadian Times, in 1978. The Times would go on to be the largest and oldest Punjabi-language weekly newspaper in Canada and the leading Punjabi-language newspaper in North America. Throughout his career, Hayer often reported about the "tensions" between the Government of India and Sikhs, both in Canada and abroad, who promote a separate country status for the Punjab area of India which would be called Khalistan, a theocratic sectarian-based Sikh homeland.

Hayer was a strong supporter of the Khalistan movement. However, after the continuous terrorist acts by Khalistani extremists against Sikhs and non-Sikhs in Punjab and the later bombing of Air India Flight 182 in 1985, Hayer began to speak out against violence in the Sikh separatist movement. In other words, though supporting the overall idea of Khalistan, he rejected the promotion of it through violent means. Moreover, following the Air India bombing, Hayer became a community contact for Canadian Security Intelligence Service.

In January 1986, a bomb targeting Hayer was left on the doorstep of his family's print shop. Police were called after his son-in-law noticed the wires sticking out of a McDonald's bag. In 1987, Hayer was able to meet Prime Minister Brian Mulroney during the prime minister's address to the Canadian Multicultural Press Association.

In 1988, Hayer wrote various editorials in his newspaper about how, while visiting a friend in 1985 in London, England, months after the Air India bombing, he overheard a conversation taking place in the offices of the Punjabi-language newspaper Des Pardes in which accused bomber Ajaib Singh Bagri described to Tarsem Singh Purewal, the editor of Des Pardes, how the bomb was smuggled onto Flight 182. Hayer began reporting this in April 1988, when he first named Bagri in his publication: "If you remember the Air India flight that blew up in midair, the police connected to this could be keeping an eye on Bagri." Subsequently, in July, he referred to "Talwinder Singh [Parmar] and Bagri having a hand in this." He followed up with more specificity in the August edition: "In 1985 in England, Bagri was talking noisily about his involvement in the blowing up of the Air India airplane."

A week after publishing his August report, Hayer survived an attempt on his life that left him in a wheelchair. He was shot in his newspaper office by Harkirat Singh Bagga, a youth who later pleaded guilty to attempted murder. Bagga turned out to be one of the suspects behind the Air India bombing: the .357 Magnum that he used was provided by a California man who was also the owner of a gun found in the residence of Inderjit Singh Reyat, the only person convicted in the Air India bombing.

On October 15, 1995, Hayer swore an affidavit to the RCMP of the overheard conversation, which was made public (but not used as evidence). According to Hayer's account:

Bagri stayed talking to Purewal for about 1 hour during which time the subject of the Air India Flight 182 bombing came up. Purewal asked Bagri how he managed to do that. Bagri replied that they (the Babbar Khalsa) wanted the government of India to come on their knees and give them Khalistan. Bagri then said that if everything would have gone as planned the plane would have blown up at Heathrow airport with no passengers on it. But because the flight was a half hour or three quarters of an hour late, it blew up over the ocean. Purewal then asked how he managed to have the bomb inside the plane. Bagri said that when the device was ready, Surjan Singh Gill was supposed to take it to the airport but when it was ready and it was shown to him, he got scared and resigned from the Babbar Khalsa. Bagri then suggested to Talwinder Singh Parmar that they should kill Surjan Singh Gill but Parmar said no because that would bring suspicion on them and so they just warned Gill not to say anything. Bagri then said that he got someone else to take the bomb inside a suitcase to the Vancouver airport and put it on the plane.

Hayer's account was consistent with other evidence about the placing of the bomb. He repeated his account on videotape and indicated he was willing to testify.

On January 24 of the following year, Purewal was killed near the offices of Des Pardes, leaving Hayer as the only other witness.

== Assassination ==
If they get me, they get me. There's nothing I can do and I'm not going to stop my work.

— Tara Singh Hayer

On November 18, 1998, Hayer (aged 62) was shot to death as he arrived home in Guildford, Surrey, from his office. Already paralyzed from the 1988 assassination attempt, he was gunned down while transferring himself from his specially designed car to his wheelchair.

A week before his death, he said, "If they get me, they get me. There's nothing I can do and I'm not going to stop my work." The killing was dubbed "an assassination" by the RCMP immediately after it was discovered. No one was ever charged with Hayer's murder.

Despite the tragedy, Hayer's wife, Baldev, told their children that they must carry on with the newspaper; they went back to the Indo-Canadian Times office that very night to remake the front page with news of Hayer's murder.

Alexandra Ellerbeck, of the New York-based Committee to Protect Journalists, said that it is extremely rare for a journalist to be murdered in Canada or the United States. Similarly, retired RCMP deputy commissioner Gary Bass said the public loses sight of "the fact that he is probably still the only journalist in Canada that has been killed for what he was doing," a fact that "kind of gets glossed over."

=== Alleged negligence of police ===
Police have been accused of failing to provide Hayer with adequate protection, mismanaging his case, and dismissing the possibility of a link between Hayer's death and the Air India bombing.

On March 19, 1998, months prior to his murder, Hayer wrote to Chief Supt. Terry Smith, the head of Surrey RCMP, about his concerns over the slew of threats he was receiving:

Given that these threats are escalating and becoming more severe in nature, I respectfully request your assistance in the investigation of these threats, which I hope will cease as a result. I respectfully request that you take immediate action with this regard. Time is of the essence. I am not capable of defending myself as easily as I used to when I could walk.

Smith responded five days later:

I am concerned that you have not brought these matters to our attention previously, given that there seems to be an ongoing series of these incidents. We view these circumstances as most serious and if they are ignored or not reported, it makes our job exceedingly more difficult to complete. If you fear for your life, and you feel you are in immediate danger, you should be contacting our complaints line.

Accordingly, in her book Loss of Faith, Vancouver Sun reporter Kim Bolan suggests that Hayer's murder was preventable. Bolan argues that the RCMP ignored or bungled numerous clues that suggested the 1988 attempt on his life was part of a larger conspiracy. Bolan also argues that the RCMP's attempts to penetrate into radical Sikh organizations brought the police "up against powerful people with connections to the highest political levels in Canada." Writing in the National Post, Jonathan Kay noted that in December 1998, just a month after Hayer's funeral, Canadian Prime Minister Jean Chrétien appeared at a fundraising dinner attended by Ripudaman Singh Malik and various other Flight 182 suspects.

Similarly, following the Air India inquiry, Justice John C. Major's 2010 report described the police's efforts to protect their witness as feeble: "nowhere are the RCMP's failures to protect its potential witnesses more dramatic than in relation to Tara Singh Hayer." Major's report dedicates over 60 pages to a thorough analysis of Hayer's role as a key witness in the Air India case, the resulting threats and attacks on Hayer, and the RCMP's inability to provide Hayer and his family with the protection that he requested and evidently needed.

Moreover, while the police did place surveillance cameras around Hayer's house, they evidently did not capture any footage on the night Hayer was killed; in fact, the cameras had not been working for months, but were never fixed, nor was the family ever told that they were useless.

The report states that Hayer's son, Dave, testified that "his father felt that the failure of the police to take any action led to a greater and greater escalation of the threats. He was of the view that, if the police had laid even minor charges against the perpetrators, it might have helped to prevent this escalation. Instead, he felt, police did not understand the culture and just 'dismiss(ed) it.'"

Major concluded his report with the following:

[T]ragically, the murder of Tara Singh Hayer, while he was supposedly under the watch of the RCMP, not only snuffed out the life of a courageous opponent of terrorism, but permanently foreclosed the possibility of his assistance in bringing the perpetrators of the bombing of Flight 182 to justice.

=== Investigation ===
Following Hayer's assassination, the investigation into his 1988 attempted murder was reopened and new evidence gathered. As such, when charges for the Air India bombing were laid against Ajaib Singh Bagri and Ripudaman Singh Malik in 2000, Bagri was also charged in the 1988 plot against Hayer. Hayer's elder son, Dave Hayer gave his account of what he called a confession by one of the accused; however, his statement was ruled inadmissible as evidence. The charge against Bagri was later stayed, when the key witness said that he no longer wanted to testify.

Malik and Bagri were acquitted of all charges related to Air India in 2005. The Committee to Protect Journalists claims to have urged then-Canadian prime minister Jean Chrétien to ensure the aggressive investigation into Hayer's murder, as well as having written to then-Indian prime minister Atal Bihari Vajpayee asking him to cooperate fully with the investigation.

The RCMP subsequently heightened its investigation into the Hayer murder, launching Project Expedio in 2005.

As part of Project Expedio, investigators conducted 'Mr. Big' operations. The second of these operations used an undercover cop posing as a South-American drug lord to target a suspect in the bomb plot named Jean Gaetan Gingras. Gingras admitted to having arranged for a device to be placed at Hayer's office in January 1986 at the request of a Babbar Khalsa member in Montreal. However, he told the undercover cop that the bomb was just to send Hayer a message and that no one was supposed to get hurt.

In 2018, retired RCMP deputy commissioner Gary Bass said that Expedio came close to laying charges in the Hayer murder.

== Awards and recognition ==
In 1992, Hayer was honored with the Commemorative Medal for the 125th Anniversary of Canada and a Certificate of Appreciation from the Royal Canadian Mounted Police (RCMP). Among his other awards, he received the Journalist Award by the Municipality of Surrey for courageous and outstanding contribution to Punjabi journalism in Canada, and the International Award of Distinction for Journalism from the International Association of Punjabi Authors and Artists. In 1995, he received the Order of British Columbia.

In 1999, Canadian Journalists for Free Expression renamed its Press Freedom Award the "Tara Singh Hayer Press Freedom Award" in Hayer's honour. Each year, the award is given to a Canadian journalist who, through his or her work, has made an important contribution to reinforcing and promoting the principle of freedom of the press in Canada or elsewhere. The CJFE also has the "Tara Singh Hayer Award for Bravery in Journalism," which is typically awarded posthumously to murdered journalists, but not always.

In 2000, journalist Gordon Donaldson added Hayer to the Canadian News Hall of Fame, making him the first Canadian of non-English, non-French origin to be added to the Hall. In May that year, Hayer was also selected as one of the International Press Institute World Press Freedom Heroes of the past 50 years. One of the presenters of this award was American senator Ted Kennedy, and it was accepted by Dave Hayer and Isabelle Martinez Hayer on behalf of the Hayer family.

In 2010, former Supreme Court Justice John C. Major described Hayer as a "courageous opponent of terrorism."

== See also ==
- Air India Flight 182
- Ujjal Dosanjh
- Press freedom in Canada
- Freedom of expression in Canada
- List of unsolved murders (1980–1999)
- International Day to End Impunity for Crimes Against Journalists
