= Panchhat =

Panchhat Panshta
- Village
- Country: India
- State: Punjab
- District: Kapurthala
- Talukas: Phagwara

Population (2011)
  - Total: 4,477

Languages
  - Official: Punjabi (Gurmukhi)
  - Regional: Punjabi
- Time zone: UTC+5:30 (IST)
- PIN: 144408

Panchhat, commonly known as Panshta is a village in Phagwara tehsil in the Kapurthala district, Punjab, India. The nearest city, Phagwara, is about 22 km (14 mi) away.

== Notable people ==
- Talwinder Singh Parmar, founder of Babbar Khalsa International and mastermind of the 1985 Air India Flight 182 bombing
