= Tarsem Singh Purewal =

Indian journalist (1934–1995)

- Born: 10 June 1934
- Died: 24 January 1995 (aged 60); Southall, London, England
- Cause of death: Assassination by gunshot
- Occupation: Editor
- Employer: Des Pardes

Tarsem Singh Purewal (10 June 1934 – 24 January 1995) was an Indian editor for Des Pardes, a Punjabi-language weekly in Gurmukhi script, published in London, UK and aimed at the local Indian community. Purewal was shot and killed. The case remains unsolved.

== Career ==
Tarsem Singh Purewal was a writer and editor of Des Pardes which is Britain's largest circulation Punjabi language newspaper. He supported his Sikh homeland but, was critical of the tactics employed by the Sikh government.

== Death ==
Mentioned locations relative to London, England, United Kingdom.

On 24 January 1995, Tarsem Singh Purewal was fatally shot at point-blank range by unknown gunmen, on the street outside his London Office. He was 61 years old. Purewal was considered to be a potential Crown witness in the upcoming Air India trial, where militant Sikh nationalists stood accused of planting a bomb on an intercontinental flight resulting in the death of hundred of passengers. Purewal was gunned down before the trial could begin. Around the same time, Purewal had been receiving threats believed to be linked to articles he published accusing Jasbir Singh Rode, the general secretary of the International Sikh Youth Federation, of stealing public funds. Raghbir Singh was arrested on 29 March 1995, facing deportation from the UK.

=== Aftermath and suspects ===
The shooting had many of the characteristics of a professional assassination. Although the attack took place on a busy London street, the police struggled to find witnesses willing to come forward.

Purewal's murder remains unsolved. Also unsolved is the murder of Tara Singh Hayer, a close friend of Purewal, and fellow Sikh journalist, from Vancouver. Hayer was murdered in a similar manner to Purewal in 1998. Several journalists and members of the Sikh community believe the two were murdered to prevent them from testifying against the terrorists responsible for the Air India bombing.

Another theory is that Purewal was murdered by a family member of one of the rape victims whose identity he revealed in Des Pardes. Purewal upset Sikh community members by publishing the names of rape victims, their assailants, and adulterers. He both owned and edited the paper, which he started in 1965. Police sources said the rape reports were thought to have been based on court cases but because Des Pardes was at the time available only in Punjabi, authorities were initially unaware that the newspaper was publishing information in breach of court rules barring the disclosure of rape victims identities.

== See also ==
- Khalistan movement § Support from outside India
