= Talwinder Singh Parmar =

Sikh militant from India (1944–1992)

1st Chief of Babbar Khalsa
- In office 1979–1992
- Preceded by: Position established
- Succeeded by: Wadhawa Singh Babbar

Personal details
- Born: 26 February 1944 Panchhat, Kapurthala State, British India (now in Punjab, India)
- Died: 15 October 1992 (aged 48) Kang Araian, Phillaur, Punjab, India

Talwinder Singh Parmar (or Hardev Singh Parmar; 26 February 1944 – 15 October 1992) was a Sikh militant and the mastermind of the 1985 Air India Flight 182 bombing, which killed 329 people. It was the worst single incident of aviation terrorism in history until the September 11 attacks in the United States. In addition, another bomb was meant to explode aboard Air India Flight 301 in Japan the same day, but it exploded while the plane was still grounded, killing two people. Parmar was also the founder, leader, and jathedar of Babbar Khalsa International (BKI), a Sikh militant group involved in the Khalistan movement. He expanded BKI internationally into Canada and Germany.

In 1981, he was accused by India of killing 2 Punjab Police officers and was arrested in 1983 in West Germany. In an interview with Des Pardes Parmar would admit involvement in the murder of Lala Jagat Narian and numerous Nirankaris. He was released in 1984 after which he immediately returned to Canada. Parmar orchestrated the bombing of Air India Flight 182, killing 329, and an attempted bombing of Air India Flight 301, killing 2 bag handlers. While out on bail, in relation to the Air India bombing, Parmar would be arrested in connection to a planned bombing of an Air India plane in New York in 1986. He would flee to Pakistan in 1988 and was allegedly killed in a gun fight with Punjab Police on 15 October 1992. He was later named as the mastermind of the 1985 Air India bombing.

== Early life ==
Talwinder Singh Parmar was born in a Sikh family of village Panchhat, Kapurthala, Punjab, India on 26 February 1944. He immigrated to Canada in May 1970, and became a naturalized citizen of Canada. Parmar would marry and have 3 children by 1978.

== Militancy ==
As per The Tribune, Parmar and Sukhdev Singh took the pledge to take revenge on the Sant Nirankari Mission, a sub-sect of the Nirankari sect of Sikhism. The pledge followed the 1978 Sikh–Nirankari clash, which saw 13 Sikh killed and 150 injured, Nirankari were also expelled by the Akal Takht out of the Sikh fold. Sukhdev founded the organization Babbar Khalsa International (BKI) along with Parmar with the objective to secede from India and form the state of Khalistan for Sikhs. Babbar Khalsa's first goals were to kill Nirankaris indiscriminately, including the Nirankari head and the "Nirankari Seven Stars" who were the Sant Nirankari version of the Panj Pyare.

In the period following the Nirankari clash and until Operation Blue Star Parmar led BKI in committing a targeted killing program against Nirankaris and anyone suspected of supporting the Nirankaris. In 1984, BKI publicly claimed responsibility for killing 35 Nirankaris and later in the same year 78 Nirankaris.

On 9 September 1981, Lala Jagat Narain was assassinated. Jagat was a former Punjab Legislative Assembly member and a former Member of Parliament. He was also the founder of Hind Samachar. Jagat was an outspoken critic of Jarnail Singh Bhindranwale and of the Khalistan movement. Parmar claimed responsibility. Bhindranwale would be accused of the murder and offered himself to the police for arrest on 20 September 1981.

On the day of his arrest, three armed men, from BKI, on a motorcycle opened fire using machine guns in a market in Jalandhar in retaliation, killing four people and injured twelve. The next day, in another incident at Tarn Taran one Hindu man was killed and thirteen people were injured. On 14 October 1981 Bhindranwale would be released by Zail Singh.

=== Murder charges and arrest ===
On 19 November 1981, the Punjab Police were looking for Tarsem Singh Kalasinghian and his accomplices, when an encounter took place at Daheru village in Ludhiana district in which Police Inspector Pritam Singh Bajwa and Constable Surat Singh of Jalandhar were gunned down. All of the militants hiding in a house of Amarjit Singh Nihang managed to escape. Among those named in the First Information Report (FIR) were Parmar, Wadhwa Singh. Amarjit Singh Nihang, Amarjit Singh (Head Constable), Sewa Singh (Head Constable) and Gurnam Singh (Head Constable). This is believed to be the first act which gained BKI and its chief, Parmar, notoriety.

Parmar became BKI's leader in Canada in 1979. After Parmar's return to Canada in 1984 following his incarceration in West Germany for a year, he embarked on a nationwide tour to establish himself as the pro-leading Khalistani Sikh. On 15 July 1984, Parmar strongly urged Sikhs to "unite, fight and kill".

In 1982, India issued a warrant for Parmar's arrest for six charges of murder, stemming from the killing of police officers and an Interpol alert would be issued. In 1983, he was arrested in Germany on charges of murdering two police officers in Punjab in 1981. Parmar went on a hunger strike in jail for his right to wear a turban and have vegetarian meals. Parmar was acquitted by German authorities and then returned to Canada. India requested for his extradition from Canada, but the request was turned down, and Canada declined to extradite Singh to India.

On 4 April 1985, Parmar would be wiretapped by Canadian Security Intelligence Service (CSIS) where he discussed a plot to assassinate Indian Prime Minister Rajiv Gandhi in the US with one Jang Singh.

== Bombing of Air India 182 and 301 ==
On 23 June 1985, Air India Flight 182 was bombed. It was a part of an attempted double-bombing which included Air India Flight 301. In March 2005 judgment, Justice Josephson of the British Columbia Supreme Court concluded that one of the leaders of the conspiracy was Parmar. The plane was destined to make its route from Montreal, Canada to New Delhi, India, over the Atlantic Ocean. All 329 passengers were killed, including 268 Canadian, 27 British and 24 Indian citizens. It remains the worst terrorist attack in Canadian history and was the world's deadliest act of aviation terrorism until the September 11 attacks in 2001.

From the time of Parmar's return to Canada following his incarceration in West Germany, he was considered a person of interest to the Canadian authorities. Surveillance on Parmar began as early as 1982, with agents being sent to follow his movements. CSIS regared Parmar as the most dangerous Sikh in Canada by 1984. A warrant under the CSIS Act to intercept communications on Parmar was sought in a federal court and granted on 14 March 1985.

=== Planning ===
Parmar was believed to have been planning terror attacks targeting India as early as 1984 when he arrived in Canada. Between his arrival and the Air India bombing Parmar began recruiting for BKI across Canada and the United States. Parmar formed guerrilla warfare training camps in the United States.

In August 1984 known criminal, Gerry Boudreault, claimed to be offered $200,000 by Parmar to place a bomb on Air India 182 from Montreal.

"This guy met me with a suitcase... A Sikh. He opened it up and there it was stuffed with $200,000, and all I had to do was put a bomb on an Air India plane. "I had done some bad things in my time, done my time in jail, but putting a bomb on a plane … not me. I went to the police."

— Gerry Boudreault

In September 1984 a man named Harmail Singh Grewal, in an attempt to bargain down his sentence, offered to provide information to CSIS and the Royal Canadian Mounted Police (RCMP) about a plot to put a bomb on Air India 182 in Montreal. Grewal was dismissed by authorities as unreliable for which CSIS would later face criticism.

On 1 June, Air India headquarters from Bombay reported to the RCMP of intelligence to plant a time-bomb on an Air India flight timed to explode over Europe. Lieutenant-Governor of Ontario James Bartleman also testified that, as a senior intelligence official in the federal Department of External Affairs, he saw a security "intercept" with a specific warning of a threat against the airline on the weekend of the bombing.

On 4 June, a CSIS team followed Parmar as he travelled with an unidentified young man, known as "Mr. X.". The car was followed to Duncan and the home of Inderjit Singh Reyat. Reyat and Parmar were seen entering the woods where soon after, a large blast would be heard. Following this CSIS agents observed something being placed in Parmar's trunk and Mr. X and Reyat being dropped off at Reyat's residence. Invesitgators believe they were testing the detonation system which would be placed in Air India 182 and 301.

On 9 June, a police informer in Hamilton reported that Parmar and Ajaib Singh Bagri had visited the Malton Sikh Temple, warning the faithful that "it would be unsafe" to fly Air India. Vancouver police also monitored militants 11 days before the bombing. A leader of the International Sikh Youth Federation (ISYF) complained that no Indian consuls or ambassadors had yet been killed, but was given the response of, "You will see. Something will be done in two weeks."

Parmar and his accomplices used payphones and talked in code. Translators' notes of wiretapped conversations include the following exchange between Parmar and a follower named Hardial Singh Johal on 20 June 1985, the day the tickets were purchased:

Parmar: Did you write the story?
Johal: No, I didn't.
Parmar: Do that work first.

This conversation appears to be an order from Parmar to book the airline tickets. It is believed that "writing the story" referred to purchasing the tickets; afterward, Johal phoned Parmar back and asked if he could "come over and read the story he asked for", to which Parmar agreed.

Soon after a man calling himself "Mr. Singh" made reservations for two flights on 22 June: one for "Jaswant Singh" to fly from Vancouver to Toronto on Canadian Pacific Air Lines (CP) Flight 086 and one for "Mohinderbel Singh" to fly from Vancouver to Tokyo on Canadian Pacific Air Lines Flight 003 and connect to Air India Flight 301 to Delhi via Bangkok. At 02:20 UTC on the same day, another call changed the reservation in the name of "Jaswant Singh" from CP 086 to CP 060, also flying from Vancouver to Toronto. The caller further requested to be put on the waiting list for AI 181 from Toronto to Montreal and AI 182 from Montreal to Bombay. The next day, at 19:10 UTC, a man wearing a turban paid for the two tickets with $3,005 in cash at a CP ticket office in Vancouver. The names on the reservations were changed: "Jaswant Singh" became "M. Singh" and "Mohinderbel Singh" became "L. Singh". The reservation and purchase of these tickets together would be used as evidence to link the two flights to one plot.

M. Singh checked in his luggage for Air India 182, which contained the bomb, 3 hours before the flight and did not board. L. Singh did the same for Air India 301.

One telephone number left as a contact was Vancouver's Ross Street Sikh temple. The other number became one of the first leads tracked by investigators, and was traced to Johal, a janitor at a Vancouver high school. Johal was an avid follower of Parmar, and thus closely scrutinized in the investigation following the Air India bombing. He was alleged to have stored the suitcase explosives in the basement of a Vancouver school and to have purchased the tickets for the flights on which the bombs were placed. Mandip Singh Grewal recounted how he saw and recognized Johal as his school's janitor when he said goodbye to his father, one of the Flight 182 victims, at the airport on the day of the bombing.

=== Bombing ===
At 12:15 AM Air India 182 took off from Montreal and landed at Toronto. It then takes off headed London. 55 minutes before Air India 182 exploded the bomb set to explode on board Air India 301 exploded at the terminal in Narita International Airport due to a Parmar and co-conspirators not accounting for daylight saving time. Two Japanese baggage handlers were killed and four other people were injured. Air India 182 exploded off coast of Dublin over the Atlantic ocean. Everyone on board, 307 passengers and 22 crew, was killed, including 82 infants.

=== Aftermath ===
On 8 November Parmar was arrested by authorities and charged, but later these charges were dropped due to lack of evidence. The investigation into Parmar was highly botched by the CSIS and RCMP leading to Parmar never being convicted. Lots of evidence was erased and much was not brought into light unit an Inquiry by the Supreme Court of Canada which concluded Parmar was the mastermind.

== After Air India bombing ==
On 1 June 1986, 5 BKI members were arrested for plotting to bomb an Air India flight headed to New Delhi from New York City. The arrested were close associates of Parmar and he was later arrested in connection with the conspiracy, while out on bail, but later released.

Tara Singh Hayer began reporting in April 1988 of Parmar and Bagri's involvement in the Air India bombing. He was a witness to Bagri's admission of taking part in the bombing. He followed up with more specificity in the August edition: "In 1985 in England, Bagri was talking noisily about his involvement in the blowing up of the Air India airplane."

A week after publishing his August report, Hayer survived an attempt on his life that left him in a wheelchair. He was shot in his newspaper's office by Harkirat Singh Bagga, a youth who later pleaded guilty to attempted murder. Bagga was one of the suspects behind the Air India bombing. The .357 Magnum that he used was provided by a California man who was also the owner of a gun found in the residence of Reyat, the only person convicted in the Air India bombing. Parmar is believed to have been involved in the conspiracy against Hayer's life.

Throughout this period Parmar accumulated much wealth through the collection of donations and shaheedi funds (martyrdom funds). Parmar would purchase four separate homes.

In 1988 Parmar would flee to Pakistan.

Parmar returned to India. On 24 November 1990, at 9 am Parmar along with other militant groups part of the Sohan Singh Committee killed Superintendent of Police (Operations) Harjit Singh in a bomb blast at Tarn Taran. Sikh militants had been studying Harjit's travel routes for some time. A remote-controlled bomb had been placed on a road Harjit usually drove by to go to the doctor. When Harjit's lead security vehicles drove by and it was just his vehicle over the bomb it was detonated. In the explosion three of his security guards were killed and his vehicle was destroyed. A permanent curfew was put on the town after. Twenty-two days prior to his death Harjit had killed the chief of Bhindranwale Tiger Force of Khalistan (Sangha) (BTFK (S)) Sukhwinder Singh Sangha along with four other militants. Khalistan Liberation Force (KLF), Khalistan Commando Force (KCF), BKI, Sikh Students' Federation (SSF), and BTFK (S) members held a meeting afterward pledging to kill Harjit. Major Singh of KCF was given the lead role in the killing.

== Death ==
In August 1992 Parmar's associate Sukhdev Singh would be killed by Punjab Police who were crushing the insurgency in Punjab through Operation Rakshak II. Parmar was killed in an alleged encounter with the Punjab police on 15 October 1992 as he attempted to cross the Indian-Pakistan border into India. Evidence later came to light showing that Parmar had been in custody for nine days where he was interrogated and then killed, with the killing framed as an "encounter". Parmar had framed ISYF and Lakhbir Singh Rode as the mastermind of the Air India 182 bombing during interrogation.

== Legacy ==
In July 2023, posters of Parmar were seen in several places in Canada advertising a car rally in his honour. The posters referred to Parmar as a "shaheed" (martyr). The posters were widely condemned by the Canadian government and by many Sikh Canadians. The Canadian government called the posters "disgusting" and said that they "glorify violence and terrorism." Many Sikh Canadians also expressed their disgust at the posters, saying that they did not represent the views of the Khalistani. The Khalistan Liberation Force, a militant outfit, defended the posters, saying that they were honouring a "martyr" who had fought for the Sikh cause.
