= Renée Sarojini Saklikar =

Indian-born Canadian lawyer, poet and author

- Born: Pune, India
- Education: University of British Columbia (BA, LL.B); Simon Fraser University
- Occupations: Lawyer, writer
- Spouse: Adrian Dix

Renée Sarojini Saklikar is an Indian-born Canadian lawyer, poet and author. Raised in New Westminster in Greater Vancouver, she married Adrian Dix. Rob Taylor of Prism International wrote in 2013 that "If you've spent much time in Vancouver's literary community, you've probably heard of, or run into, Renée Saklikar."

== Personal life ==
She was born in Pune, India. After moving to Canada from India, Saklikar had lived in Newfoundland, then Montreal and Saskatchewan as well as other places where she did not spend as much time. She then moved to New Westminster.

Saklikar's father was the Rev. Vasant Saklikar, a minister of the United Church of Canada. He was a Hindu who, after arriving in Canada, converted to Christianity. Zebunnisa Jethwa and Umar Jethwa, Saklikar's aunt and uncle, perished on Air India Flight 182. A gynecologist and a surgeon, respectively, the two were Indians visiting relatives in the Vancouver area. Saklikar was one of the interview subjects of the film Air India 182, and her mother Bhanu Saklikar, was also interviewed.

She attended the University of British Columbia, getting a Bachelor of Arts in English literature, and then an LL.B. in 1990. In 1991 she was called to the British Columbia Bar. She had been trained as a barrister and solicitor.

== Writing career ==
Saklikar was originally a lawyer, but as she grew older she became a poet and writer. In 2010, she graduated from the Writers Studio of the Continuing Studies Department at Simon Fraser University; she stated that the Writers Studio had revealed to the world that she was a poet. Saklikar co-founded the Lunch Poems reading series of Simon Fraser University. As of 2014 she serves as an instructor and writing mentor for the SFU Continuing Studies department. Saklikar served as Poet Laureate for the City of Surrey, British Columbia, Canada from 2015-2018. As of February 2021, she serves on the boards of Turning Point Ensemble, Poetry Canada, the Surrey International Writers Conference and The Ormbsy Review.

== Awards ==
- Saklikar was awarded the Canadian Authors Association Award for Poetry in 2014 for her book, children of air india.
- Saklikar's book of poetry, children of air india, was a finalist for the Dorothy Livesay Poetry Prize (part of the BC and Yukon Book Prizes).
- The Revolving City: 51 Poems and the Stories Behind Them, which Saklikar co-edited, was shortlisted for the 2016 City of Vancouver Book Award.
- A chapbook, After the Battle of Kingsway, the bees, (above/ground press, 2016), was a finalist for the 2017 bpNichol award.
- Listening to the Bees received the Gold Medal for the 2019 Independent Publisher Book Awards in the Environment/Ecology category.

== Works ==
- children of air india: un/authorized exhibits and interjections (Nightwood Editions, 2013), a book of poetry
- air india [redacted]: silence & longing 30 years since flight 182: A collaboration with Turning Point Ensemble
- The Revolving City: 51 Poems and the Stories Behind Them (Anvil Press/SFU Public Square, 2015), co-edited by Wayde Compton and Renée Saklikar, was co-published by Anvil Press and SFU Public Square.
- Thot-J-Bap: A visual/poetry collaboration with Chris Turnbull (2016)
- Listening to the Bees (Nightwood Editions, 2018), co-written by Mark Winston and Renée Saklikar, published by Nightwood Editions.
- After the Battle of Kingsway, the bees (above/ground press, 2016), is a chapbook which contain parts of THOT-J-BAP, an epic sci-fi journey poem that Saklikar has been writing.
- Bee Studies: A collaboration with Turning Point Ensemble.
- thecanada?project - a lifelong poem chronicle about place, identity, language.

== See also ==
- Indo-Canadians in Greater Vancouver
