= Children of Air India =

2013 poetry collection by Renée Sarojini Saklikar

Children of Air India: Un/authorized Exhibits and Interjections
- Author: Renée Sarojini Saklikar
- Language: English
- Subject: Air India Flight 182 bombing
- Genre: Poetry
- Publisher: Nightwood Editions
- Publication date: 2013
- ISBN: 978-0-88971-287-4

Children of Air India: Un/authorized Exhibits and Interjections is a 2013 poetry collection by Renée Sarojini Saklikar, published by Nightwood Editions. The title refers to the bombing of Air India Flight 182 in 1985.

The book's launch was held at the Djavad Mowafaghian World Art Centre in the Goldcorp Centre for the Arts, located at Simon Fraser University Vancouver, on Wednesday November 13, 2013. The book, which examines the event itself and the impact on other persons, includes poems and written scenarios. Saklikar did not include names of many victims in her stories since her publisher had advised her not to include them. The name of one of her cousins, Irfan, is within the final version.

The book won the 2014 Canadian Authors Association Award for Poetry, and was a finalist for the 2014 Dorothy Livesay Poetry Prize, category BC Book Prize.
