= Lata Pada =

Indian-Canadian dancer and choreographer

Lata Pada (ಲತಾ ಪಾದ)
- Lata
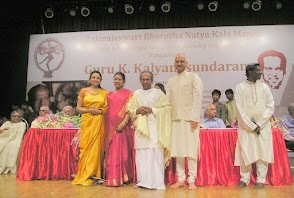
- Born: Lata; 7 November 1947 (age 79); Bombay, India
- Citizenship: Canadian
- Education: Learnt under master teachers Kalaimamani Kalyanasundaram, and Padmabhushan Kalanidhi Narayanan.; Elphinstone College in Mumbai
- Occupations: Dancer, Choreographer, Teacher and Author
- Known for: Bharatanatyam
- Spouse(s): Vishnu pada, Hari Ventakacharya
- Awards: 2008, she was made a Member of the Order of Canada, * On 18 June 2012, Pada was awarded the Queen Elizabeth II Diamond Jubilee Medal
- Website: www.sampradaya.ca

Lata Pada, (ಲತಾ ಪಾದ) CM (born 7 November 1947) is an Indian-born Canadian choreographer and Bharatanatyam dancer. Pada is the founder and artistic director of Sampradaya Dance Creations, a dance company that performs Indian dance. She is also the founder and director of Sampradaya Dance Academy, a leading professional dance training institution that is the only Indian dance school in North America affiliated with the prestigious, UK-based Imperial Society for Teachers of Dancing. Pada founded the dance company in 1990; Pada said that she founded the company because she wanted to showcase Bharatantyam dance as an art form throughout the world. Pada is known as an influential figure in Indian style dance in Canada.

== Early life and dance career ==
Born on 7 November 1947, Lata was the eldest of four children in a well-educated family. Her father was an electrical engineer in the Royal Navy, and her mother eventually had a career in insurance management.

At the age 13, Lata gave her solo debut recital known as the 'Arangetram'. Lata, who attended Elphinstone College in Mumbai, gave up her studies in science to pursue Indian dance, and trained under the gurus Kalaimamani Kalyanasundaram and Padmabhushan Kalanidhi Narayanan.

Pada married geologist Vishnu Pada (ವಿಷ್ಣು ಪಾದ) on 30 October 1964, when she was 17 years old. Marriage took place in Canada. Vishnu was graduated from McGill University in geology; when he came to India he saw Lata and the marriage negotiations were done. After coming to Thompson, Manitoba, Canada, where husband worked for Inco, she became a member of a sorority, and was able to combine her domestic duties with a social life and her artistic vocation. She and Vishnu were the first Indian family in the mining town.

== Career in Bharata natyam ==
Lata pada's career as a soloist began in 1965, the year after she immigrated to Canada. At this time, her work was largely traditional. However, when she lived in Indonesia for several years, Lata Pada became interested in cross-cultural collaboration and opened up her choreography to other influences. In 1979, she returned to Canada. Pada's solo dances featured bharata natyam in a traditional form and in a more contemporary style. In 1990, Pada founded Sampradaya Dance Creations in Toronto, Ontario, and Sampradaya Dance Academy in nearby Mississauga. Sampradaya Dance Creations presents a range of solo and ensemble choreography in both a classical and contemporary repertoire. The company is also engaged in education and community outreach.

Among the dance productions of Lata Pada on various themes, two productions highlighting women and identity are praiseworthy:

- 'Triveni', which relates Sita, Draupadi and Ahalya to generations of invisible, often silent, women, ever since.
- 'Sohrab: Mirage' (Sohrab, a Dari word, means mirage), that dwells on the experiences of Afghan women under the Taliban regime.

== Personal life ==
Lata and her husband, Vishnu Pada moved first to Indonesia before settling in Sudbury, Ontario, nearly 40 years ago. She devoted her life in looking after her husband, two daughters, and teaching dance. She was visiting India almost every year to train with her dance guru. In 1985 Lata Pada and her family decided to take an extended vacation to India. She travelled ahead of her family so that she could practice for a scheduled performance in Bangalore, and across India. Lata was in Mumbai rehearsing for her tour, while her husband and daughters stayed behind in Sudbury, Ontario because Brinda was graduating from high school. On 23 June, her husband and two daughters Arti and Brinda, who were due to join her, were on the Delhi-bound Air India flight 182 that crashed off the coast of Ireland.

Numbed with grief, she instinctively turned to her only remaining anchor, dance. On the larger canvas of universal grief, the two personal questions that ring through 'Revealed by Fire' are: "If you take away my husband, am I still a wife? If you take away my children, am I still a-mother."

Lata Pada became a spokesperson for the families of the victims. Lata Pada expressed disappointment in the Canadian government's investigation of the Air India incident.

Pada received a master's degree in fine arts from York University in 1997.

In September 2000, Lata Pada remarried Hari Venkatacharya who was later arrested for fraud in 2013.

Pada lives in Mississauga, near Toronto, Ontario.

== Awards, accolades ==
- In December 2008, Lata pada was made a Member of the Order of Canada for her contributions to the development of Bharatanatyam as a choreographer, teacher, dancer and artistic director, as well as for her commitment and support of the Indian community in Canada. Lata was also recently appointed as adjunct professor in the Graduate Faculty of Dance, York University, Toronto.
- She was one of the interview subjects of the documentary Air India 182. She was also interviewed for the Mayday episode on AI182.
- On 9 January 2011, Pada was conferred the Pravasi Bharatiya Samman Award, by the President of India. This award, instituted by the Government of India in 2003, recognizes outstanding contributions by overseas Indians in the diaspora.
- Lata was awarded the Pravasi Bharatiya Samman Award for her exemplary contributions in the field of dance, as well as for her unrelenting efforts in seeking a public inquiry into the 1985 bombing of Air India flight 182.
- Pada is the first performing artist to be given this prestigious honour in Canada.,
- On 18 June 2012, Pada was awarded the Queen Elizabeth II Diamond Jubilee Medal, for her outstanding contributions in promoting South Asian dance in Canada.

== See also ==
- Indo-Canadians in Toronto
- The biography of Lata pada, and her YouTube,
