= International Sikh Youth Federation =

Banned organisation in India

- ਇੰਟਰਨੈਸ਼ਨਲ ਸਿੱਖ ਯੂਥ ਫੈਡਰੇਸ਼ਨ
- Logo of the ISYF
- Leader: Jasvir Singh Rode
- Founded: 23 September 1984
- Dates active: 1984 – present
- Country: India
- Active regions: India, United Kingdom, Canada
- Ideology: Sikh nationalism; Khalistan movement; Separatism; Anti-Indian sentiment; Ethnonationalism; Anti-establishment; Religious nationalism
- Political position: Far-right
- Status: Active
- Size: Believed to have hundreds to possibly thousands of supporters worldwide

The International Sikh Youth Federation (ISYF) is a pro-Khalistan militant organisation that aims to establish an independent homeland for the Sikhs called Khalistan from the Punjab state of India. It is banned as a terrorist organisation under Japanese, Indian, Canadian and American counter-terrorism legislation. The Government of India has declared it a terrorist organisation. While banned, the organisation continues to receive significant financial support from Sikh diaspora people based in Canada, the United States, and the United Kingdom.

== Origin ==
International Sikh Youth Federation (ISYF) was formed on 23 September 1984 in Walsall, UK after the Operation Blue Star conducted by the Indian Military. It was founded by Jasbir Singh Rode, the nephew of Jarnail Singh Bhindranwale. Its first conference was held in Walsall, UK.

== History and activities ==
In 1984, the All India Sikh Students Federation (AISSF) started the ISYF in the United Kingdom as an international branch.

The 1985 bombing of Air India Flight 182 off Ireland, the deadliest aircraft terror attack until the September 11, 2001 attacks, and the attempted bombing of Air India Flight 301, were allegedly carried out by Sikh extremists. Inderjit Singh Reyat, a dual British-Canadian citizen and member of the ISYF, was found guilty of manslaughter for making the bombs and had to spend more than 20 years imprisoned in Canada, and is the only individual convicted in these attacks as of 9 Feb 2009.

ISYF members have engaged in terrorist attacks, assassinations, and bombings against both Indian figures and moderate Sikhs opposing them. The organisation has also collaborated and associated with other Sikh militant organisations, including Babbar Khalsa, the Khalistan Liberation Force, and Khalistan Commando Force.

Lord Bassam of Brighton, then Home Office minister, stated that ISYF members working from the UK had committed "assassinations, bombings and kidnappings" and were a "threat to national security." In 2001 it was proscribed as a terrorist organisation by the British government for its attacks.

ISYF head Lakhbir Singh Rode was accused by a chargesheet for a bomb blast in a Ludhiana Court on 23 December 2021. It resulted in 1 death and 6 injuries.

== Leadership ==
Jasbir Singh Rode was the nephew of Bhindranwale and member of fundamentalist Sikh organisation Damdami Taksal. After Operation Bluestar while in Pakistan Rode used the Sikh shrines at Pakistan to make anti-India speeches and provoked the audience to attack the Indian diplomats who were present. Rode then arrived in the United Kingdom in August 1984.

On 23 September 1984 the formation of International Sikh Youth Federation (ISYF) was announced by Harpal Singh and Jasbir Singh Rode. The group had a 51-member panel headed by Pargat Singh. But, by December 1984, Rode was expelled from the UK for publicly advocating violent methods in support of the Khalistan movement.

Rode was arrested by Indian authorities in Manila while seeking asylum in a chase spanning Thailand and the Philippines. He was imprisoned for two years in India. Upon his release, he moderated, now advocating pursuing constitutional changes within Indian framework. This mode disappointed many of his followers and created a rift in the UK branches roughly along north/south lines: the northern branches known as ISYF (Rode) followed Rode's moderate stance while the southern branches instead followed Dr. Sohan Singh.

The former leader of ISYF, Lakhbir Singh Rode, was sought for trial in India. He was wanted in cases of arms smuggling, conspiracy to attack government leaders in New Delhi, and spreading religious hatred in Punjab. As per Indian sources, he resided in Lahore, Pakistan after he had escaped to Pakistan due to his association with illegal activities in India while his family settled in Canada. He died of a heart attack in December 2023 in Pakistan's Lahore.

== Foreign support ==
=== Pakistan ===
There are allegations made by sources from the Indian based website the South Asian Terrorism portal that the ISYF has been supported by Pakistan's Inter-Services Intelligence organisation.

The Inter-Services Intelligence has long been accused of providing support to the ISYF. Following 1984, ISYF was established in the United Kingdom and later expanded its presence to Pakistan, where it received logistical and operational backing from the ISI. Over the years, the ISI reportedly facilitated training camps, supplied arms and ammunition, and funded ISYF operations. Indian intelligence reports have highlighted the role of the ISI in reviving militancy in Punjab by using Pakistan-based groups like ISYF and Babbar Khalsa International to conduct infiltration and attacks, particularly through the Jammu and Kashmir region.

In addition to direct support, the ISI is also believed to have brokered linkages between ISYF and pan-Islamist militant groups, most notably Lashkar-e-Taiba (LeT). The ISYF is reported to have been the first Sikh militant group to engage ideologues from Markaz-e-Dawat-ul-Irshad, LeT's parent organisation. These interactions, which began in the mid-1990s, evolved into joint training and operational collaborations. By the early 2000s, LeT and ISYF had reportedly established a shared base near Nankana Sahib in Pakistan’s Punjab province, with ISI backing. These alliances enabled joint planning of attacks and resource sharing, with meetings reportedly held in international locations such as Berlin to coordinate funding and logistics for future militant operations.

== Bannings ==
=== United Kingdom ===
In February 2001, the United Kingdom banned twenty-one groups, including the ISYF, under the Terrorism Act 2000. The ISYF was removed from the list of proscribed groups in March 2016 "following receipt of an application to deproscribe the organisation".

In a separate legal challenge by the leadership of the Sikh Federation (UK), including Bhai Amrik Singh, the Home Secretary confirmed on 14 December 2015 that she would be recommending to Parliament that the ban on the International Sikh Youth Federation (ISYF) should be removed (this was removed in March 2016).

=== India ===
In 2002, the ISYF was banned in India, under the Unlawful Activities (Prevention) Act designated as terrorist organisation by the Government of India. It remains banned in India since then.

=== Japan ===
The Japanese government banned it in 2002.

=== Canada ===
In June 2003, Canada banned the organisation. The Vancouver Sun reported in February 2008 that Singhs were campaigning to have both the Babbar Khalsa and International Sikh Youth Federation delisted as terrorist organisations. The article went on to state that the Public Safety Minister had never been approached by anyone lobbying to delist the banned groups and said, "the decision to list organisations such as Babbar Khalsa, Babbar Khalsa International and the International Sikh Youth Federation as terrorist entities under the Criminal Code is intended to protect Canada and Canadians from terrorism".

=== United States ===
The ISYF was added to the US Treasury Department terrorism list on 27 June 2002. In April 2004, the United States added four organisations, including the ISYF, to its terror list, allowing the US to deny entry (and to deport) any of its members.

== See also ==
- Khalistan movement
- Kharku
