= Kang Araian =

Kang Araian Kang Ariayan
- Village
- Location in Punjab, India Kang Araian (India)
- Coordinates: 31°03′49″N 75°44′25″E
- Country: India
- State: Punjab
- District: Jalandhar
- Tehsil: Phillaur

Government
  - Type: Panchayat raj
  - Body: Gram panchayat

Area
  - Total: 225 ha (560 acres)

Population (2011)
  - Total: 1,122; 594/528 ♂/♀
  - Scheduled Castes: 609; 316/293 ♂/♀
  - Total Households: 255

Languages
  - Official: Punjabi
- Time zone: UTC+5:30 (IST)
- Telephone: 01826
- ISO 3166 code: IN-PB
- Vehicle registration: PB-37
- Website: jalandhar.gov.in

Kang Araian is a village in Phillaur in Jalandhar district of Punjab State, India. It is located 10 kilometres (6.2 mi) from sub district headquarter and 60 kilometres (37 mi) from district headquarter. The village is administrated by Sarpanch an elected representative of the village.

== Demography ==
As of 2011, the village has a total number of 255 houses and a population of 1122 of which 594 are males while 528 are females. According to the report published by Census India in 2011, out of the total population of the village 609 people are from Schedule Caste and the village does not have any Schedule Tribe population so far.

== See also ==
- List of villages in India
