= Air India Flight 182 =

1985 aircraft bombing over the Atlantic Ocean

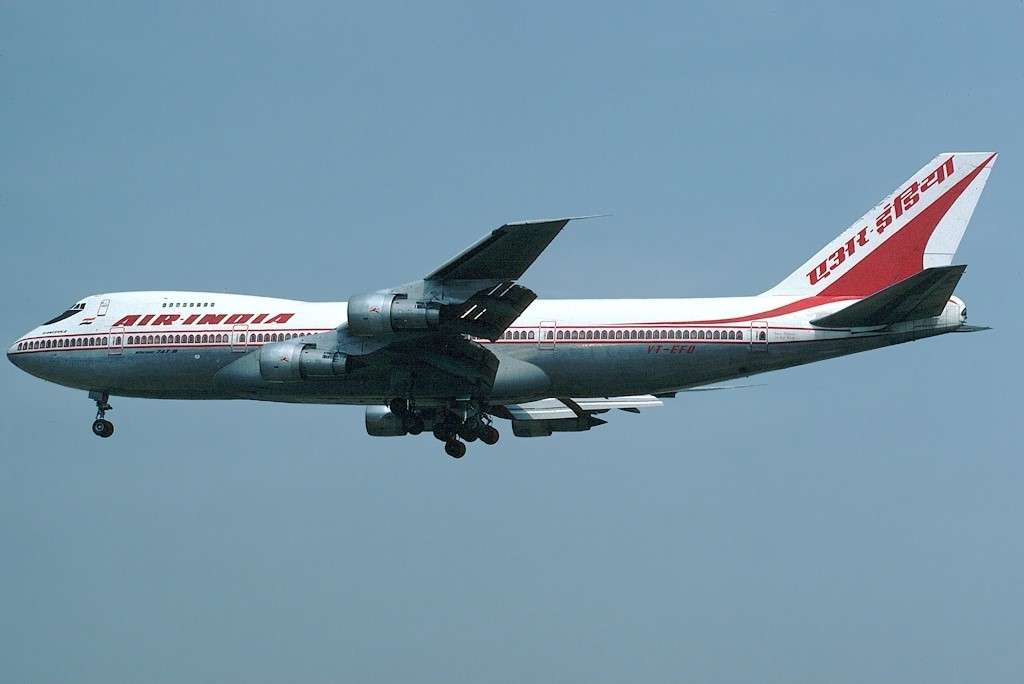
- VT-EFO, the aircraft involved, seen in 1984

Bombing
- Date: 23 June 1985
- Summary: In-flight breakup due to terrorist bombing by the Babbar Khalsa
- Site: Atlantic Ocean, 190 km (120 mi) WSW of Waterville, Ireland; 51°4′N 12°49′W

Aircraft
- Aircraft type: Boeing 747-237B (Note: The aircraft was a Boeing 747-200B model; Boeing assigns a unique code for each company that buys one of its aircraft, which is applied as a suffix to the model number at the time the aircraft is built, hence "747-237B" for a Boeing 747-200B built for Air India.)
- Aircraft name: Emperor Kanishka
- Operator: Air India
- IATA flight No.: AI182
- ICAO flight No.: AIC182
- Call sign: AIRINDIA 182
- Registration: VT-EFO
- Flight origin: Toronto Pearson International Airport, Toronto, Canada (as Flight 181)
- 1st stopover: Montréal–Mirabel International Airport, Mirabel, Quebec, Canada
- 2nd stopover: London Heathrow Airport, London, United Kingdom
- 3rd stopover: Palam International Airport, Delhi, India
- Destination: Sahar International Airport, Bombay, India
- Occupants: 329
- Passengers: 307
- Crew: 22
- Fatalities: 329
- Survivors: 0

Air India Flight 182 was a scheduled international flight from Toronto Pearson International Airport (as Air India Flight 181) to Mumbai’s Sahar International Airport with regular Mirabel-London-Delhi stops. On the morning of June 23, 1985, the Boeing 747 serving the Montreal-London segment exploded near the coast of Ireland from a bomb planted by Sikh terrorists from the Babbar Khalsa. All 329 people on board were killed including 268 Canadian citizens, 27 British citizens, and 22 Indian citizens. The bombing of Air India Flight 182 is the worst terrorist attack in Canadian history and was the world's deadliest act of aviation terrorism until the September 11 attacks in 2001. It remains the deadliest aviation incident in the history of Air India, and the deadliest no-survivor hull loss of a single Boeing 747. (Note: Japan Airlines flight 123 and Tenerife Airport Disaster also involved Boeing 747s and had higher casualties, however there were 4 survivors on JAL123, and the Tenerife Airport disaster involved collision of two 747s.)

The perpetrators are believed to be Inderjit Singh Reyat, a dual British-Canadian national, who pleaded guilty in 2003, and Talwinder Singh Parmar, who was one of the key individuals associated with the Khalistani separatist group, Babbar Khalsa. The plot included a second bomb, intended to explode on the same day and murder the occupants of Air India Flight 301 serving the Tokyo-Bangkok-Delhi route. Instead, it killed two baggage handlers at Tokyo's Narita International Airport when the bomb suitcase was being transferred from the original Canadian airplane to the Air India 747; fragments from this bomb proved Reyat's involvement. The two bombs had started their journey when checked onto a pair of Canadian Pacific Air Lines flights from Vancouver International Airport, one headed to Tokyo – for connection with Air India Flight 301, and one to Montreal – for connection with Air India Flight 182.

The plan's execution had transnational consequences and involved citizens and governments from five nation states. Babbar Khalsa was implicated but not confirmed to be responsible for the bombing. Although a handful of people were arrested and tried for the Air India bombing, the only person convicted was Inderjit Singh Reyat, who pleaded guilty in 2003 to manslaughter. He was sentenced to fifteen years in prison for assembling the bombs that exploded on board Air India Flight 182 and at Narita.

The subsequent investigation and prosecution lasted almost twenty years. This was the most expensive trial in Canadian history, costing nearly C$130 million. The two accused, Ripudaman Singh Malik and Ajaib Singh Bagri, were both found not guilty.

The Governor General-in-Council in 2006 appointed the former Supreme Court Justice John C. Major to conduct a commission of inquiry into the failure to prevent the terrorist acts, compounded by the failure to achieve convictions of any perpetrators beyond the bomb maker. His report, which was completed and released on 17 June 2010, concluded that a "cascading series of errors" by the Government of Canada, the Royal Canadian Mounted Police (RCMP), and the Canadian Security Intelligence Service (CSIS) had allowed the militant attack to take place.

== Background ==
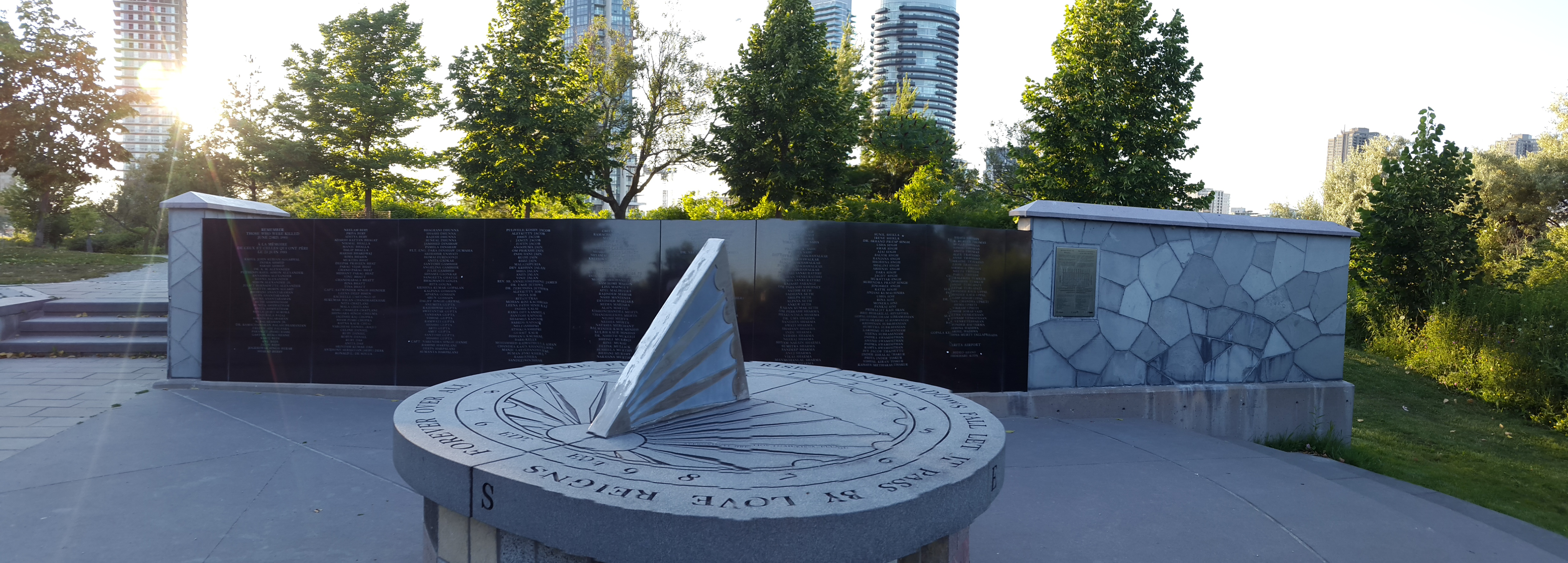
Air India 182 memorial, Toronto

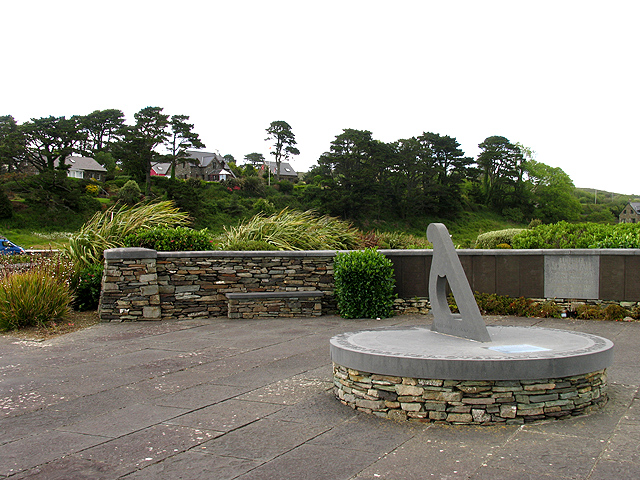
Memorial in Ahakista, Cork

During the 1970s, many Sikhs emigrated to western Canada. These included men who later became leaders and members of the Babbar Khalsa including Talwinder Singh Parmar, Ajaib Singh Bagri, Ripudaman Singh Malik and Inderjit Singh Reyat. By the 1980s, the area around Vancouver, British Columbia, had become the largest centre of Sikh population outside India.

In India on 13 April 1978 a convention organized by the Sant Nirankari Mission took place at the time of the important Sikh festival of Vaisakhi, a celebration of the birth of Khalsa. The convention was led by Gurbachan Singh, leader of the Sant Nirankari Mission, and was organized in Amritsar with permission from the Akali Dal-led government of the state of Punjab. The practices of the Sant Nirankari were considered heresy by the school of orthodox Sikhism expounded by Bhindranwale. A procession of about 200 Sikhs led by Bhindranwale and Fauja Singh of the Akhand Kirtani Jatha (AKJ) left the Golden Temple, heading towards the Nirankari Convention. In the ensuing violence, several people were killed: two of Bhindranwale's followers, eleven members of the Akhand Kirtani Jatha and three Nirankaris.

A criminal case was filed against 62 Nirankaris who were charged by the Akali-led government in Punjab with the murder of 13 Sikhs. The case was heard in the neighbouring Haryana state, and all the accused were acquitted, on the basis that they acted in self-defence. The Punjab government decided not to appeal the decision. As a result of the Nirankaris receiving positive attention in the media, some orthodox Sikhs claimed this to be a conspiracy to defame the Sikh religion. Bhindranwale increased his rhetoric against the perceived enemies of Sikhs. A letter of authority was issued by Akal Takht to ostracize the Sant Nirankaris and created an environment where some of his followers felt justified to kill the perceived enemies of Sikhism. The chief proponents of this attitude were the Babbar Khalsa founded by the widow, Bibi Amarjit Kaur of the Akhand Kirtani Jatha; the Damdami Taksal led by Jarnail Singh Bhindranwale, who had also been in Amritsar on the day of the attack on the convention; the Dal Khalsa, formed with the object of demanding a sovereign Sikh state; and the All India Sikh Students Federation, which was banned by the government.

The founders of this Panthan group (sect) in Vancouver vowed to avenge the deaths of Sikhs. Talwinder Singh Parmar led the militant wing of AKJ, which became the Babbar Khalsa, to attack the Nirankaris. On 24 April 1980 Gurbachan Singh, the Baba (head) of the Nirankaris, was killed. A member of the Akhand Kirtani Jatha, Ranjit Singh, surrendered and admitted to the assassination three years later, and was sentenced to serve thirteen years at the Tihar Jail in Delhi.

On 19 November 1981, Parmar was among the alleged militants who escaped from a shootout in which two Punjab Police officers were gunned down outside the house of Amarjit Singh Nihang in Ludhiana district. This added to the notoriety of Babbar Khalsa and its leader. He went to Canada. In 1982, India issued a warrant for Parmar's arrest for six charges of murder, stemming from the killing of the police officers. India notified Canada that Parmar was a wanted militant in 1981 and asked for his extradition in 1982. Canada denied the request in July 1982.

After an Interpol alert, Parmar was arrested while attempting to enter West Germany. West Germany chose to handle the case locally rather than transfer him over to India. Parmar went on a hunger strike to win his religious right to wear a turban and have vegetarian meals in the Düsseldorf jail. After India received information that Parmar had made assassination threats against Indira Gandhi, they found that Germany had decided that the evidence was weak.

In 1983, rebels led by Damdami Taksal Jathedar (leader) Jarnail Singh Bhindranwale occupied Akal Takht of Golden Temple and amassed weapons in the Sikh temple. They passed the Anandpur Sahib Resolution, which demanded that the state be given more powers from the Central government, and greater autonomy, by changes to the Indian constitution. The total number of deaths was 410 in violent incidents and riots while 1,180 people were injured. The Central government rejected the secessionist demands and on 3–6 June 1984, Prime Minister of India Indira Gandhi ordered Operation Blue Star, to remove the militants from the Golden Temple in which thousands of Sikhs were injured and killed as the Indian Army attacked the Golden Temple complex to remove Bhindrawale and his followers. Sikhs protested against the operation worldwide. On 31 October 1984, Indira Gandhi was assassinated by two of her Sikh bodyguards. In retaliation, the 1984 anti-Sikh riots, guided by certain Indian National Congress members, killed thousands of Sikhs in India.

=== Preparation ===
Parmar visited Inderjit Singh Reyat, a car mechanic and electrician who lived in Duncan, British Columbia, a small community north of Victoria on Vancouver Island. He asked him to construct a bomb; Reyat later claimed he had no idea for what it would be used. Reyat asked various people in the community about dynamite, saying he wanted to remove tree stumps on his property. Reyat also discussed explosives with a co-worker, while expressing anger at the Indian government and Indira Gandhi in particular.

Later that year, Ajaib Singh Bagri accompanied Parmar as his right-hand man in the militancy against the Indian government. Bagri worked as a forklift driver at a sawmill near the town of Kamloops. He was known as a powerful preacher in the Indo-Canadian community. The pair travelled across Canada to incite Sikhs against the Indian government for conducting Operation Blue Star. They used the meetings as fundraisers for Babbar Khalsa. A former head priest in Hamilton testified that Bagri said, "The Indian Government is our enemy, the same way the Hindu society is our enemy." Bagri told a congregation, "Get your weapons ready so we can take revenge against the Indian Government".

== Plot preparations ==
In late 1984, at least two informers reported to authorities on the first abortive plot to bomb Air India Flight 182, which then flew out of Montreal's Mirabel International Airport. In August 1984, the known criminal Gerry Boudreault claimed that Talwinder Parmar showed him a suitcase stuffed with US$200,000 (~$523,670 in 2025) payment if he would plant a bomb on a plane. He decided, "I had done some bad things in my time, done my time in jail, but putting a bomb on a plane ... not me. I went to the police." In September, in an attempt to get his sentence for theft and fraud reduced, Harmail Singh Grewal of Vancouver told the Canadian Security Intelligence Service (CSIS) and the Royal Canadian Mounted Police (RCMP) of the plot to bomb the flight from Montreal. Both reports were dismissed as unreliable. In June 1985, Paul Besso, an RCMP informant, claimed he had recorded Sikh militants on Vancouver Island discussing plans to bomb an Air India flight. Using an RCMP provided "body pack" and his wired van, Besso intended to record Sikh drug dealers but quickly realized they were militants. Besso claimed during a CBC interview that the entire meeting was recorded by Besso and provided to the RCMP a week before the bombing happened, with transcripts even stating that Air India was the target for the Sikh militants.

The moderate Sikh Ujjal Dosanjh had spoken out against violence by Sikh extremists. He was then injured in February 1985 by an assailant wielding an iron bar. His skull was broken severely and he required 80 stitches in his head. On 5 March 1985, three months before the bombing, the CSIS obtained a court order to place Parmar under surveillance for one year. Although the Babbar Khalsa had not yet been officially banned, the affidavit for surveillance stated, it "is a Sikh terrorist group now established in Canada", it "has claimed responsibility for more than forty assassinations of moderate Sikhs and other persons in the Punjab," and "penned its name to threatening letters [addressed to] ... high officials in India". The affidavit said that on 15 July 1984, Parmar urged the Coach Temple congregation of Calgary, Alberta, to "unite, fight and kill" to avenge the attack on the Golden Temple.

=== Explosives and clocks ===
In April 1985, a Canadian man familiar with explosives was asked by Reyat how much dynamite it would take to blow up a tree stump. Reyat asked numerous people in Duncan about explosives, and expressed the need for revenge. Reyat sought cases of dynamite and appeared willing to pay three times the normal price. He eventually confided to one acquaintance that it was not about stumps, but "trouble in the old country", that he needed "explosives to help my countrymen." One friend declined to get him dynamite, but did lend him a 400-page manual on mining with explosives.

On 8 May 1985, Reyat bought a Micronta digital automobile clock at the RadioShack store in Duncan. Designed for a 12-volt automobile electrical system, it could also be powered by a 12-volt lantern battery. The 24-hour alarm activated a buzzer. Reyat returned to the store a week later to buy an electrical relay, after asking how to get the buzzer signal to power another device. Wiretappers recorded nine telephone calls in one month between Reyat and Parmar's residence in Vancouver; Reyat called either from his residence or workplace on Vancouver Island. As a result of this activity, the government added Reyat to the list of persons being monitored for militant activities. The Canadian government would later accuse Reyat of lying in 2003, when at first he said he did not know for what the three clocks he had bought could be used. He later said Parmar needed an explosive device to blow up a bridge or something large in India, and that he needed timers for an explosive device. The relay could be used to trigger the detonator circuit for a blasting cap, which would provide the initial shock needed to detonate larger explosives, such as dynamite.

Reyat later visited a television repair shop, seeking help for a partially disassembled car clock wired to a lantern battery. He claimed that he needed help so that the buzzer stayed on rather than intermittently beeping, so that it would turn on a light in his camper to wake him up. The repairman knew Reyat did not own a camper. Justice J. Raymond Paris said at Reyat's 1991 trial that this was an odd use for a timer.

=== Bomb tests ===
By mid-May, Reyat had gone into the woods to test a device with a 12-volt battery, cardboard cylinder, gunpowder, and some dynamite, but the device failed to work. The wooded area was in proximity to Duncan and Paldi. Later, Reyat acquired between six and eight sticks of dynamite "to blow up unidentified stumps if need be in the future" from a Duncan well driller after visiting his house to fix a truck. He also obtained a few blasting caps days later. On 31 May 1985, Reyat brought his timer, attached to a boombox, into his shop so that his fellow employee at Duncan Auto Marine Electric could help him fix it for a friend, but he returned the radio after it did not work properly.

On 4 June, CSIS agents Larry Lowe and Lynn Macadams followed Parmar and a "youthful man" (identified only as "Mr. X", "Third Man" or "Unknown Male") as they went from Parmar's house to the Horseshoe Bay Ferry Terminal, rode the Nanaimo-bound ferry, and visited Reyat at his home and shop at Auto Marine Electric. The three drove to a deserted bush area, where Reyat was observed taking an object into the woods. Staying out of sight, the agents, who did not bring a camera, only heard a bang which sounded like a "loud gunshot". Later tests showed it could also have been an explosion, and later searches turned up remnants of an aluminium "electrical blasting cap". J.S. Warren, director-general of counter-terrorism at CSIS, would later ask the two CSIS agents on 16 July 1986 why they failed to ask the police to stop and question the suspects, or search the vehicle, which might have deterred the bombing plot. Warren also placed blame on the Royal Canadian Mounted Police, stating they also had the option to question the suspects but declined to do so for an unknown reason.

The next day, Reyat purchased a large Sanyo component tuner, model FMT 611 K, at Woolworths, and left his name and telephone number on the charge slip, which was later found in a search of his home. Reyat also bought smokeless gunpowder from a sporting goods store, signing "I. Reyat" on the explosives log. Study of debris from the Narita explosion would eventually show the bomb had been housed inside a Sanyo tuner with a serial number matching a model sold only in British Columbia, and used a Micronta clock as a timer, which powered a relay with an Eveready 12-volt battery to trigger blasting caps to set off a high explosive consistent with sticks of dynamite, all matching items purchased by Reyat. This would lead to his eventual conviction. As late as 2010, Reyat admitted only to buying and assembling some parts, but denied he ever made a bomb, knew what the bomb was to be used for, who was behind any plot, or that he ever asked or knew the name of the man who he said stayed in his house for a week completing construction of the explosive device after his device failed.

On 9 June 1985, a police informer in Hamilton reported that Parmar and Bagri had visited the Malton Sikh Temple, warning the faithful that "it would be unsafe" to fly Air India. Vancouver police also monitored militants 11 days before the bombing. A leader of the International Sikh Youth Federation complained that no Indian consuls or ambassadors had yet been killed, but was given the response of, "You will see. Something will be done in two weeks."

=== Tickets ===
The suspects in the bombing used pay phones and talked in code. Translators' notes of wiretapped conversations include the following exchange between Talwinder Parmar and a follower named Hardial Singh Johal on 20 June 1985, the day the tickets were purchased:

Parmar: Did you write the story?
Johal: No, I didn't.
Parmar: Do that work first.

This conversation appears to be an order from Parmar to book the airline tickets. It is believed that "writing the story" referred to purchasing the tickets; afterward, Johal phoned Parmar back and asked if he could "come over and read the story he asked for", to which Parmar agreed.

Moments after the wiretapped conversation, at 01:00 UTC, a man calling himself "Mr. Singh" made reservations for two flights on 22 June: one for "Jaswant Singh" to fly from Vancouver to Toronto on Canadian Pacific Air Lines (CP) Flight 086 and one for "Mohinderbel Singh" to fly from Vancouver to Tokyo on Canadian Pacific Air Lines Flight 003 and connect to Air India Flight 301 to Delhi via Bangkok. At 02:20 UTC on the same day, another call changed the reservation in the name of "Jaswant Singh" from CP 086 to CP 060, also flying from Vancouver to Toronto. The caller further requested to be put on the waiting list for AI 181 from Toronto to Montreal and AI 182 from Montreal to Bombay. The next day, at 19:10 UTC, a man wearing a turban paid for the two tickets with $3,005 in cash at a CP ticket office in Vancouver. The names on the reservations were changed: "Jaswant Singh" became "M. Singh" and "Mohinderbel Singh" became "L. Singh". The reservation and purchase of these tickets together would be used as evidence to link the two flights to one plot.

One telephone number left as a contact was Vancouver's Ross Street Sikh temple. The other number became one of the first leads tracked by investigators, and was traced to Hardial Singh Johal, a janitor at a Vancouver high school. Johal was an avid follower of Talwinder Singh Parmar, and thus closely scrutinized in the investigation following the Air India bombing. He was alleged to have stored the suitcase explosives in the basement of a Vancouver school and to have purchased the tickets for the flights on which the bombs were placed. Mandip Singh Grewal recounted how he saw and recognized Johal as his school's janitor when he said goodbye to his father, one of the Flight 182 victims, at the airport on the day of the bombing.

Reyat went to work on 21 June. Phone records show he called Johal at 7:17 p.m. A witness whose name was protected testified that Bagri asked to borrow her car the night before the bombing to take some suitcases to the airport, though he would not be flying with them.

== Aircraft ==
The aircraft operating the flight was a Boeing 747-237B registered VT-EFO and named Emperor Kanishka. The aircraft first flew on 19 June 1978 and was delivered to Air India in July 1978. On 28 January 1983, the aircraft operating as Air India Flight 306 was damaged following a ground collision with an Indian Airlines Airbus A300 at Palam Airport. The aircraft was repaired and returned to service.

== Bombings ==
On 22 June 1985, at 13:30 UTC (6:30 a.m. PDT) an unidentified man calling himself "Manjit Singh" (checked in as M. Singh) called to confirm his reservations on Air India Flight 181/182. He was told he was still wait-listed, and was offered alternative arrangements, which he declined. At 15:50 UTC (8:50 a.m. PDT), M. Singh checked into a busy line of 30 people for Canadian Pacific Air Lines (CP Air) Flight 60 from Vancouver to Toronto, which was scheduled to leave at 9:18 a.m. He asked agent Jeanne Bakermans to check his dark brown, hard-sided Samsonite suitcase, and have it transferred to Air India Flight 181 and then to Flight 182 to India. Bakermans initially refused his request to inter-line the baggage since his seat from Toronto to Montreal and from Montreal to Bombay was unconfirmed. He insisted, but the agent again rebuffed him, telling him, "Your ticket doesn't read that you're confirmed" and "we're not supposed to check your baggage through." The man said, "Wait, I'll get my brother for you." As he started to walk away, she relented and agreed to accept the bag, but told him he would have to check in again with Air India in Toronto. After the mass murders, Bakermans would realize this deception got the bag on its way to Air India Flight 182. The anxious man was never identified. A few minutes later, Bakermans also accepted the check in of a passenger with the ticketed name L. Singh (later thought to possibly be the fake M. Singh's fake brother) for CP Air Flight 003 to Tokyo, with a confirmed connection there to Air India Flight 301 to New Delhi; L. Singh's suitcase contained ‘a second bomb, with which the terrorists intended to destroy Air India Flight 301 while mid-air to New Delhi, simultaneously with the mid-air destruction of Air India Flight 182, but instead killed two baggage handlers in Japan as it was being transferred to Narita International Airport. At 16:18 UTC (9:18 a.m.), CP Air Flight 60 departed Vancouver without M. Singh having boarded.

Reyat would later testify that he travelled by ferry from Duncan to Vancouver that morning to work on his brother's truck. Phone records show someone called from his residence in Duncan to Johal's number at 10:50 a.m. and 4:00 p.m. later that day. Reyat was seen in the company of another East Indian man at the Auto Marine Electric store in Burnaby, near Parmar's house, between 10:00 a.m. and 11:30 a.m. He bought two 12 volt batteries similar to the one used in the explosive device tested in the woods, and they were to fit into a special metal bracket he had brought with him. Constable Clark-Marlowe later believed there was "ample time for Inderjit Singh Reyat to obtain the batteries at the Auto Marine Electric limited store in Burnaby, incorporate the batteries in the assembly of an explosive device and then have the device transported in a suitcase to the Vancouver airport".

At 20:22 UTC (4:22 p.m. EDT), Canadian Pacific Air Lines Flight 060 arrived in Toronto twelve minutes late. Baggage handlers were sorting out arriving and connecting baggage. Some of the passengers and baggage, including the bag M. Singh had checked in, were transferred to Air India Flight 182. In response to threats from Sikh terrorists, Air India had requested extra security, leading Canada to assign extra policemen in terminals in Toronto and Montreal, and all baggage was to be checked by X-ray or by hand. The x-ray machine broke down that day, however, so inspectors used a portable PDD-4 explosive sniffer. An Air India security officer had demonstrated that it made a loud scream when a lit match was held an inch away, and showed that it should be used around the edge of the bag being tested. Between 5:15 and 6:00, the sniffer was heard to beep at a soft-sided maroon suitcase with a zipper going all around; it beeped in a low volume near the zipper lock. Because Air India baggage checkers were not instructed on how to react to only a short beep, they allowed the bag to pass on its way. Later investigation would determine that the two containers that could have contained M. Singh's bag were placed close to the sensitive electronic bay of the aircraft.

At 00:15 UTC (8:15 p.m., 22 June) on 23 June, Air India Flight 181, a Boeing 747-237B named Emperor Kanishka, departed Toronto Pearson International Airport for Montréal–Mirabel International Airport. The aircraft was an hour and 40 minutes late because a "fifth pod" (a spare engine) was installed under the aircraft below the left wing to be flown to India for repairs and maintenance. Some of the parts had to be stored in the rear cargo compartment. The 5th pod engine was a serviceable spare engine that had been on lease to Air Canada after one of their Boeing 747s suffered an engine failure on the way to India. That engine received a post lease inspection and was declared serviceable by Air Canada personnel.

The plane arrived in Montréal-Mirabel International Airport at 01:00 UTC (9:00 p.m., 22 June). There, it became Flight 182. Flight 182 departed for London Heathrow Airport, en route to Palam International Airport, Delhi, and Sahar International Airport, Bombay. The plane had 329 people on board: 307 passengers and 22 crew. Captain Narendra Singh Hanse (56) served as the captain, with Captain Satwinder Singh Bhinder (41) as the first officer and Dara Dumasia (57) as the flight engineer. Many of the passengers were going to visit family and friends.

At 07:09:58 GMT (8:09:58 a.m. Irish time), the crew of the Boeing 747 "squawked 2005" (a routine activation of its aviation transponder) as requested by Shannon Airport Air Traffic Control (ATC), then disappeared from the radar screens five minutes later. At 07:14:01 GMT (8:14:01 a.m. Irish time), a bomb hidden in a Sanyo tuner in a suitcase in the forward cargo hold exploded while the plane was at 31,000 feet (9,400 m) at 51°3.6′N 12°49′W. It caused explosive decompression and the break-up of the aircraft in mid-air. The wreckage settled in 6,700 feet (2,000 m) deep water off the south-west Irish coast, 120 miles (190 km) offshore of County Cork. No "mayday" call was received by Shannon ATC. ATC asked aircraft in the area to try to contact Air India, to no avail. By 07:30:00 GMT, ATC had declared an emergency and requested nearby cargo ships and the Irish Naval Service vessel LÉ Aisling to look out for the aircraft.

Meanwhile, sometime before 20:22 UTC (1:22 p.m. PDT), L. Singh (also never identified) checked in for the 1:37 p.m. CP Air Lines Flight 003 to Tokyo with one piece of luggage, which was to be transferred to Air India Flight 301 to Bangkok. However, L. Singh did not board the flight. The second bag checked in by L. Singh went on Canadian Pacific Air Lines Flight 003 from Vancouver to Tokyo. There were no x-ray inspections of luggage on this flight. Its target was Air India Flight 301, due to leave with 177 passengers and crew bound for Bangkok-Don Mueang, but 55 minutes before the Flight 182 bombing, it exploded at the terminal in Narita International Airport. Two Japanese baggage handlers were killed and four other people were injured.

== Recovery of wreckage and bodies ==
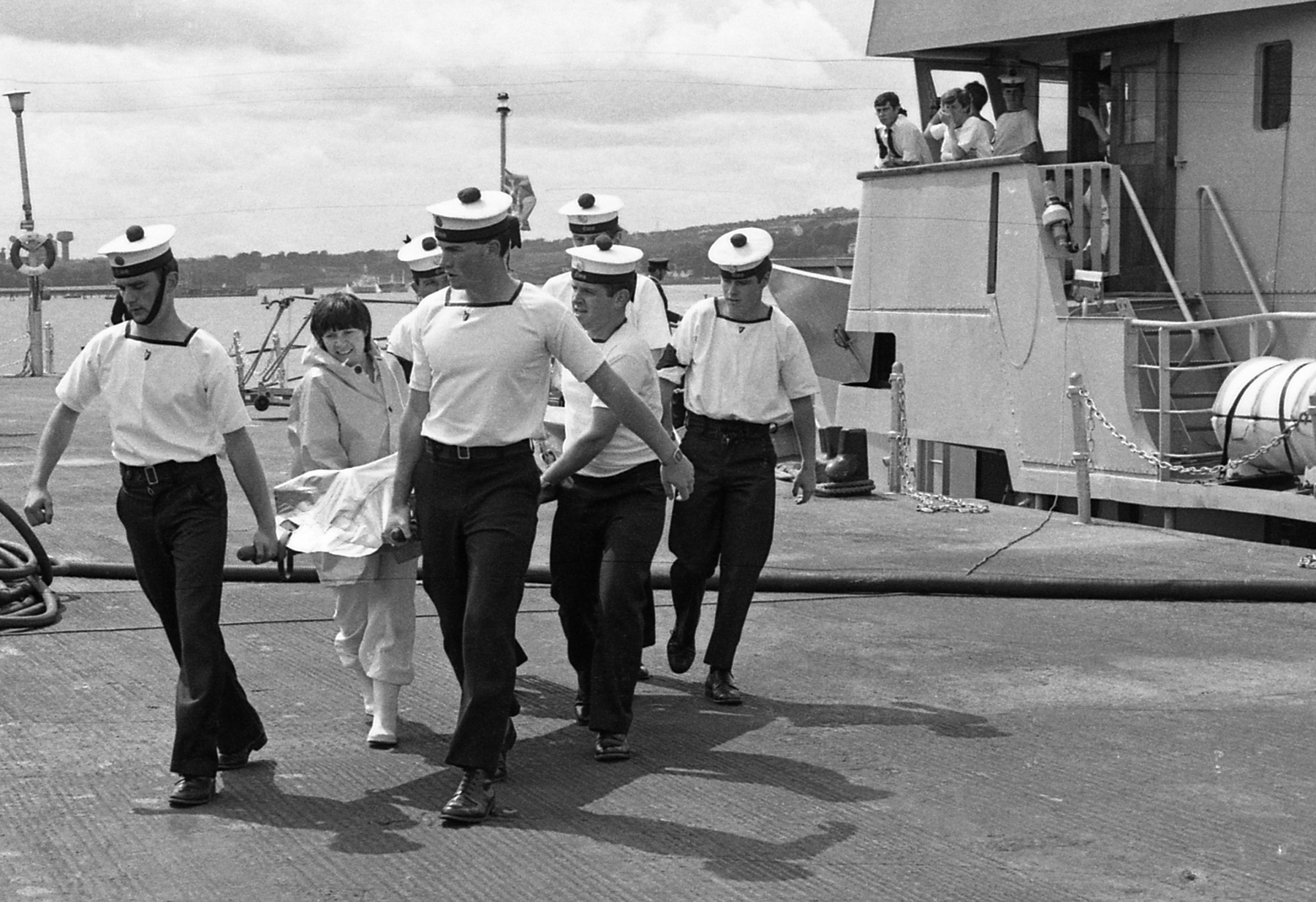
Irish Naval Service recovering bodies from the Air India Flight 182 disaster

By 09:13 UTC, the cargo ship Laurentian Forest (MV Cape Lobos) discovered wreckage of the aircraft and many bodies floating in the water. India's civil aviation minister announced the possibility that the plane had been destroyed by a bomb, and the cause was probably some sort of explosion. Previous 747s had been damaged or destroyed on the ground, and Korean Air Lines Flight 007 had been shot down by fighter jets, but this was the first jumbo jet downed by a bomb on board.

The bomb killed all 22 crew and 307 passengers. Of those, 132 bodies were recovered; 197 were lost at sea. Eight bodies exhibited "flail pattern" injuries, indicating that they had exited the aircraft before it hit the water. This was a sign that the aircraft had broken up in mid-air. Twenty-six bodies showed signs of hypoxia (lack of oxygen). Twenty-five, mostly victims who were seated near windows, showed signs of explosive decompression. Twenty-three had signs of "injuries from a vertical force". Twenty-one passengers were found with little or no clothing. One official quoted in the report stated:

"All victims have been stated in the PM reports to have died of multiple injuries. Two of the dead, one infant and one child, are reported to have died of asphyxia. There is no doubt about the asphyxial death of the infant. In the case of the other child (Body No 93) there was some doubt because the findings could also be caused due to the child undergoing tumbling or spinning with the anchor point at the ankles. Three other victims undoubtedly died of drowning."

Two of these drowning victims, a pregnant woman in her second trimester and her unborn son, were described by John Hogan in testimony given at a coroner's inquest convened in Cork on 17 September 1985:

The other significant findings were large amounts of frothy fluid in her mouth and nostrils, and all of the air passages and the lungs were water-logged and extremely heavy. There was water in the stomach and the uterine. The uterus contained a normal male foetus of approximately five months. The foetus was not traumatized and in my opinion death was due to drowning.

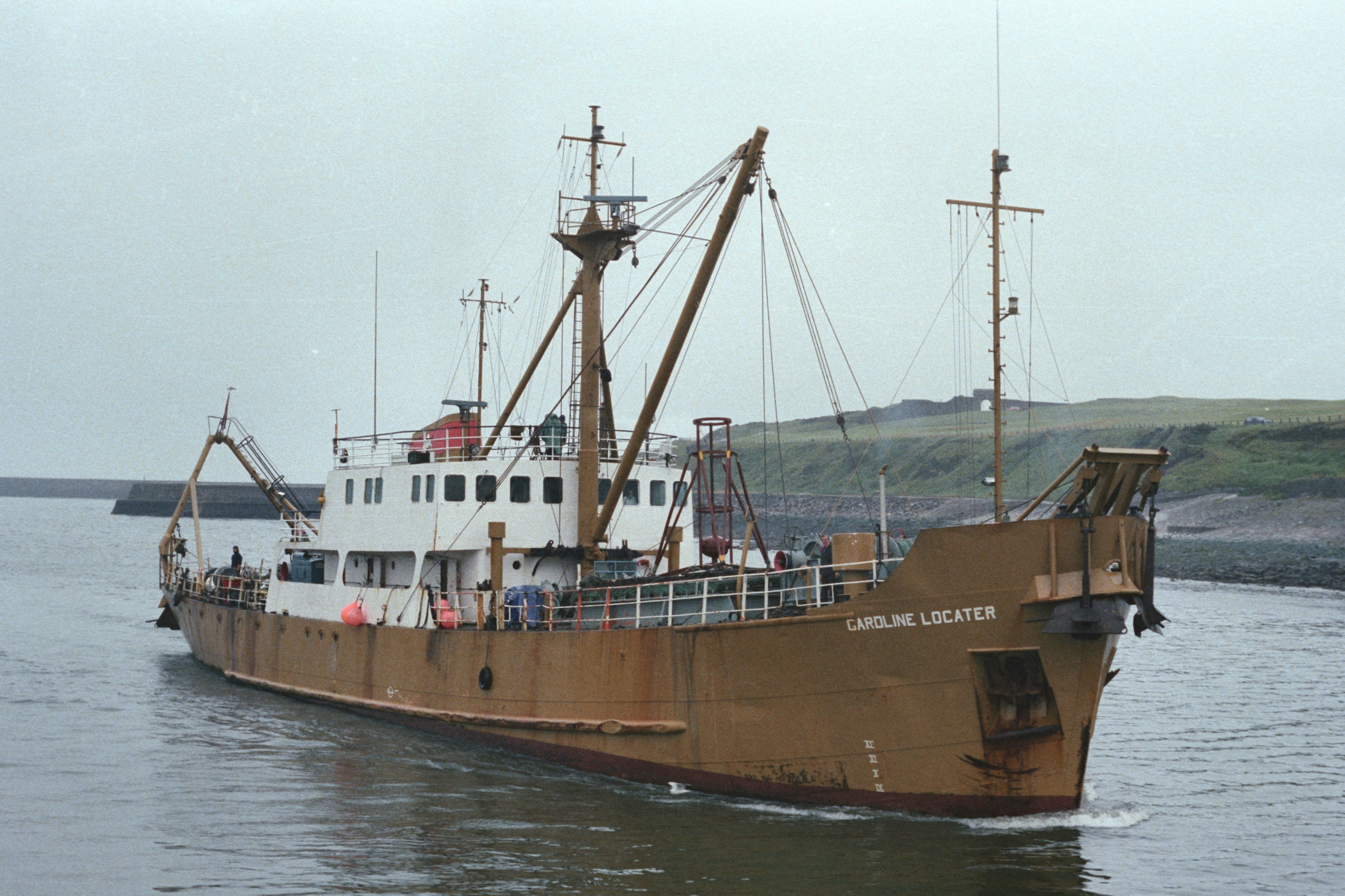
Gardline Locater

Additional evidence to support a bombing was retrieved from the broken-up aircraft, which lay on the sea bed in the Atlantic ocean at a depth of 6,700 feet (2,000 m). The British vessel Gardline Locater, equipped with sophisticated sonar, and the French cable-laying vessel Léon Thévenin, with its remotely operated underwater vehicle Scarab 1, were dispatched to locate the flight data recorder (FDR) and cockpit voice recorder (CVR) boxes. The boxes would be difficult to find and it was imperative that the search commence quickly. By 4 July, Gardline Locator detected signals on the sea bed. On 9 July, Scarab 1 pinpointed the CVR and raised it to the surface. The next day, the FDR was also located and recovered. In 1985, the Canadian Coast Guard Ship (CCGS) John Cabot participated in the investigations, mapping the underwater wreckage of the aircraft.

=== Victims ===
Nationality	Passengers	Crew	Total
Canada	268	—	268
United Kingdom	27	—	27
India	—	22	22
United States	10	—	10
Undetermined	2	—	2
Total	307	22	329

A casualty list was published by the Canadian Broadcasting Corporation. The victims included 268 Canadians, 27 Britons, 22 Indians, 10 Americans, and 2 people of undetermined nationality. Canadians of Indian descent made up the majority of the passengers.

Between 82 and 86 passengers were children, including six infants. There were 29 entire families on the plane. Two children not on board had both parents on board, resulting in them becoming orphaned. There were six sets of parents who lost their children, and an additional 32 people not on the aircraft who had the remaining members of their families on board.

Most of the victims resided in southern Ontario and were Hindus. Some of the victims were Sikhs; around 35 passengers were Sikhs from Greater Montreal. In terms of metropolitan areas, the Greater Toronto Area was the home of the majority of the passengers, with Greater Montreal also having the next largest number of passengers. Some passengers originated from British Columbia. Gurpreet Singh wrote in the Georgia Straight that "B.C. has far fewer Air India victims' families than Ontario." Forty-five passengers were employees of Air India or relatives of Air India employees. Notable passengers and crew included Inder Thakur, an Air India purser and former actor along with his wife and son; and Yelavarthy Nayudamma, a scientist and chemical engineer.

Among the passengers on Flight 182, 105 had boarded the flight at Mirabel Airport, while 202 had boarded at Toronto Pearson International Airport. The report stated that interlining passengers boarding Flight 181 in Toronto who became passengers on Flight 182 included ten passengers connecting from Vancouver, five passengers from Winnipeg, four passengers from Edmonton, and two passengers from Saskatoon. It stated that all of these passengers had taken flights on Air Canada, and no interlining passengers boarded Flight 182 in Montreal. In the documentary Air India 182, Renée Sarojini Saklikar stated that her aunt and uncle had taken a Canadian Pacific Air Lines flight from Vancouver to connect to Air India 182; the two were on AI182 while it was in Montreal. The flight crew and cabin crew of Flight 182 had boarded in Toronto and commanded the segment of Flight 181 from Toronto to Montreal.

The majority of the victims and families were from English-speaking households. One victim's family encountered difficulties obtaining inquiries and having memorial service content in French.

== Investigations ==
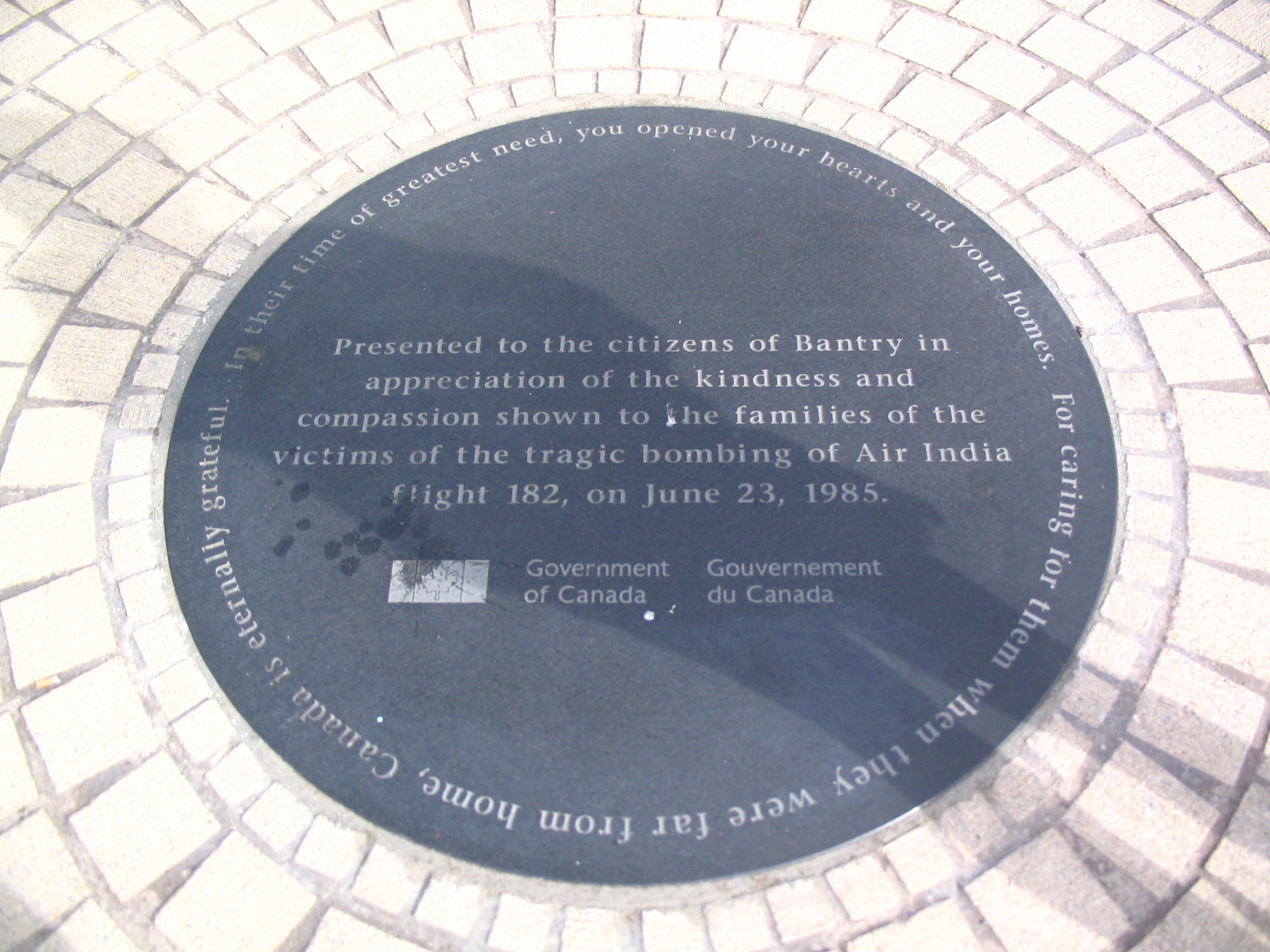
A commemorative plaque presented to the citizens of Bantry, Ireland, by the government of Canada for the residents' kindness and compassion to the families of the victims of Air India Flight 182

Within hours, Canada's Indian community was a focus of attention as victims and among hints that officials were investigating connections to the Sikh separatists who had threatened and committed acts of violence in retaliation against Hindus.

In the subsequent worldwide investigations over six years, many threads of the plot were uncovered. Based on recovery of wreckage and bodies from the surface, it was decided to retrieve wreckage and recorders from the bottom of the sea. That voice and flight recorders were cut out at the same time, and damage to parts recovered from the forward cargo bay consistent with a blast, established that it was probably a bomb near the forward cargo hold that brought the plane down suddenly. The flight was also soon linked to the earlier bombing in Japan which had also originated from Vancouver; tickets for both flights had been purchased by the same person, and in both cases the planes were carrying bags without the passenger who checked them in.

One of the problems the investigators thought may have been the reason of the supposed crash was that the aircraft was carrying a spare engine to a maintenance facility. Therefore, there would have been more weight on one side. This reason was ruled out as the flight recorders relayed information of the rudder position which assists in the carrying of a 5th engine.

No bomb parts were recovered from the ocean, but investigations of the blast at Tokyo established that the bomb had been placed in a Sanyo stereo tuner of a series that had been shipped to Vancouver in Canada. The RCMP assigned no less than 135 officers to check every store that could have sold Sanyo tuners, leading to the discovery of a recent sale to mechanic Inderjit Singh Reyat in his hometown of Duncan, British Columbia. RCMP contacted the CSIS and found they were already investigating the Sikh activists; RCMP learned that CSIS already had wiretaps and had observed Reyat and Parmar at the test blast near Duncan, and had recovered blasting cap shunts and a paper bundle wrapper from a blasting cap. A search recovered the receipt for a Sanyo Tuner Model FMT-611K with invoice with his name and phone number, along with sales of other bomb components. It was not until January 1986 that Canadian investigators at the Canadian Aviation Safety Board concluded that a bomb explosion in the forward cargo hold had downed the airliner. On 26 February 1986, Supreme Court Judge Kirpal of India presented an inquiry report based on investigation conducted by H.S. Khola (the "Khola Report"). The report also concluded that a bomb originating in Canada brought down the Air India flight.

Based on observations, wiretaps, searches and arrests of persons believed to be participants, the bombing was determined to be the joint project of at least two Sikh militant groups with extensive membership in Canada, the United States, Britain and India. Militant Sikhs were angered by the destruction of the Golden Temple and deaths of Sikhs during India's ground assault on separatists, as well as the 1984 anti-Sikh riots.

=== Suspects ===
The multiple suspects in the bombing were members of a Khalistani group called the Babbar Khalsa (banned in Europe and the United States as a proscribed militant group) and other related groups who were at the time agitating for a separate Sikh state (called Khalistan) in Punjab, India.

- Talwinder Singh Parmar (26 February 1944 – 15 October 1992) – a Canadian citizen born in Punjab and living in British Columbia, was a high-ranking official in the Babbar Khalsa. His phone was tapped by CSIS for three months before the bombing. He was originally believed to have been killed during a gunfight between officers of the Punjab Police and six Sikh militants. According to the First information report by the Punjab Police, Parmar was killed by AK-47 fire from a rooftop at 5:30a.m on 15 October 1992. However, this account is disputed by post-mortem report suggesting he was killed between 12a.m and 2a.m. However, the investigative newsmagazine Tehelka alleged that Parmar was executed without trial after 4 days of interrogation and torture by the Punjab Police on 15 October 1992. Tehelka also stated that Parmar believed he was framed for the attack, alleging Lakhbir Singh Rode planned the Air India 182 bombing. Contrary to what Tehelkha suggested in the same article, the RCMP did not believe Rode had any role in the bombing and established Parmar as one of the masterminds behind the bombing.
- Inderjit Singh Reyat (born 11 March 1952) – was born in India, but moved to the United Kingdom with his family in 1965 and later to Canada in 1974, and holds dual British and Canadian citizenship. He worked as an auto mechanic and electrician in Duncan, British Columbia on Vancouver Island. Investigation of the bombing in Tokyo led to discovery that he had bought a Sanyo radio, clocks and other parts found after the blast. He was convicted of manslaughter for constructing the bomb. As part of a deal, he was to testify against others, but as he declined to implicate others, he would be the only suspect convicted in the case. Reyat was released to halfway house in 2016 and now fully released with some restrictions since early 2017 to his family's home in BC.
- Ajaib Singh Bagri (born 4 October 1949) – a mill worker living in Kamloops. During the founding convention of the World Sikh Organization in New York in 1984, Bagri gave a speech in which he proclaimed that, "until we kill 50,000 Hindus, we will not rest."
- Ripudaman Singh Malik (4 February 1947 – 14 July 2022) - a Vancouver businessman who was involved with opening Khalsa Credit Union and Khalsa Schools. He was charged in 2000 but acquitted in 2005. In July 2022, Malik was murdered in Surrey, British Columbia. The RCMP arrested two individuals in his murder, who later pled guilty to second-degree murder.
- Surjan Singh Gill (born 19 October 1942) – was living in Vancouver as the self-proclaimed consul-general of Khalistan. Some RCMP testimony claimed he was a mole who left the plot just days before its execution because he was told to pull out, but the Canadian government denied that report. He later fled Canada and was believed in August 2003 to be hiding in London, England.
- Hardial Singh Johal (20 November 1946 – 15 November 2002) – a follower of Parmar who was active in the Gurdwaras where Parmar preached. On 15 November 2002, Johal died of natural causes at age 55. His phone number was left when ordering the airline tickets, he was seen at the airport the day the luggage was loaded, and he had allegedly stored the suitcases containing the bombs in the basement of a Vancouver school, but was never charged in the case.
- Daljit Sandhu – named by a Crown witness as the man who picked up the tickets. During the trial, the Crown played a video from January 1989 in which Sandhu congratulated the families of Indira Gandhi's assassins and stated that "she deserved that and she invited that and that's why she got it." Sandhu was cleared by Judge Ian Josephson in a 16 March judgment.
- Lakhbir Singh Rode – the leader of the Sikh separatist organization International Sikh Youth Federation. In September 2007, the commission investigated reports, initially disclosed in the Indian investigative news magazine Tehelka, that Parmar had allegedly confessed and named the hitherto-unnamed Lakhbir Singh Rode as the mastermind behind the explosions. This claim appears to be inconsistent with other evidence known to the RCMP.

On 17 August 1985, Reyat became a third suspect once the receipt for the tuner was found with his name. On 6 November 1985, the RCMP raided the homes of Parmar, Reyat, Gill and Johal. In a 4 1/2-hour interview, Reyat denied all knowledge of the test blast or even Parmar. After he was told the CSIS had seen both of them, he changed his story that Parmar really wanted to build a device powerful enough so that he could take the device back to India to destroy a bridge. He explained that the gunpowder in the test was a failure, as the device fizzled. The search of Reyat's house produced a carton with an unusual green tape also found in the Narita blast and a can of Liquid Fire-brand starting fluid matching fragments found at the blast site, along with blasting caps and dynamite, including a pound of dynamite in a bag taken out its original tube casing, though none was consistent with blast residue. Reyat insisted only the clock, relays and tuner had been purchased for other than "benign purposes". There was insufficient evidence to hold Parmar as charges were dropped days later.

Bagri would later state before his later trial that he knew he was probably a suspect by October 1985, but insisted he would have faced charges if there were any evidence he had anything to do with the bombing. It was established by November that it was a man with a Sikh name who probably checked the bag in Vancouver that caused the crash. Parmar was not seen in Canada after sometime in late 1986. He ultimately returned to India, where he was killed in a shootout with police in 1992.

=== Trials ===
Authorities initially lacked evidence to link Inderjit Singh Reyat directly to either the Narita or Air India blasts and pursue a conspiracy to commit murder charge. Instead, Reyat pleaded guilty on 29 April 1986 to possession of an explosive substance and possession of an unregistered firearm. His sentence was a light $2,000 fine. Just three months later, Reyat moved his family from Canada to Coventry, near Birmingham, in the UK. Reyat was soon hired at a Jaguar factory where he worked for nearly two years.

Mounties working with prosecutor Jardine and RCMP and Japanese experts eventually determined the components of the bomb from fragments and matched them with items that Reyat possessed or had purchased. Prosecutor Jardine visited Tokyo five times to meet with Japanese authorities, and Canada formally asked that evidence to be sent to Canada. Still lacking sufficient evidence for a murder charge, Jardine recommended two manslaughter charges and five explosives-related counts, resulting in a request to Britain to extradite Reyat, who was arrested on 5 February 1988 as he was driving to the Jaguar car plant. After lengthy proceedings to extradite him from Britain, Reyat was flown to Vancouver on 13 December 1989 and his trial began 18 September 1990. On 10 May 1991, he was convicted of two counts of manslaughter and four explosives charges relating to the Narita Airport bombing. He was sentenced to 10 years' imprisonment.

Fifteen years after the bombing, on 27 October 2000, RCMP arrested Malik and Bagri. They were charged with 329 counts of first-degree murder in the deaths of the people on board Air India Flight 182, conspiracy to commit murder, the attempted murder of passengers and crew on the Canadian Pacific flight at Japan's New Tokyo International Airport (now Narita International Airport), and two counts of murder of the baggage handlers at New Tokyo International Airport. It became known as the "Air India Trial".

On 6 June 2001, RCMP arrested Reyat, who was about to finish his earlier 10-year-sentence, on charges of murder, attempted murder, and conspiracy in the Air India bombing. On 10 February 2003, Reyat pleaded guilty to one count of manslaughter for aiding in the construction of a bomb. He was sentenced to five years in prison. The court claimed Reyat was guilty of helping make the bomb, but that he lacked any knowledge of how it would be used and lacked an intent to kill. He was expected to provide testimony in the trial of Malik and Bagri, but prosecutors were vague.

The trial of Malik and Bagri proceeded between April 2003 and December 2004 in Courtroom 20, more commonly known as "the Air India courtroom". At a cost of $7.2 million, (~$11.4 million in 2025) the high-security courtroom was specially built for the trial in the Vancouver Law Courts. On 16 March 2005, Justice Ian Josephson found the two accused not guilty on all counts because the evidence was inadequate:

I began by describing the horrific nature of these cruel acts of terrorism, acts which cry out for justice. Justice is not achieved, however, if persons are convicted on anything less than the requisite standard of proof beyond a reasonable doubt. Despite what appear to have been the best and most earnest of efforts by the police and the Crown, the evidence has fallen markedly short of that standard.

In a letter to the Attorney General of British Columbia, Malik demanded compensation from the Canadian government for wrongful prosecution in his arrest and trial. Malik owes the government $6.4 million and Bagri owes $9.7 million in legal fees. On 14 July 2022, Ripudaman Singh Malik, one of the men acquitted in the 1985 Air India militant bombings, was shot to death in Surrey, B.C.

=== Reyat's perjury trial ===
In February 2006, Inderjit Singh Reyat was charged with perjury with regard to his testimony in the trial. The indictment was filed in the Supreme Court of British Columbia and lists 27 instances in which Reyat allegedly misled the court during his testimony. Reyat had pleaded guilty to constructing the bomb, but denied under oath that he knew anything about the conspiracy.

In the verdict, Justice Josephson said:

I find him to be an unmitigated liar under oath. Even the most sympathetic of listeners could only conclude, as do I, that his evidence was patently and pathetically fabricated in an attempt to minimise his involvement in his crime to an extreme degree, while refusing to reveal relevant information he clearly possesses."

On 3 July 2007, with perjury proceedings still pending, Reyat was denied parole by the National Parole Board, which concluded he was a continued risk to the public. The decision meant Reyat had to serve his full five-year sentence, which ended 9 February 2008.

Reyat's perjury trial began in March 2010 in Vancouver, but was abruptly dismissed on 8 March 2010. The jury was dismissed after "biased" remarks were made about Reyat by a woman juror.

A new jury was chosen. In September 2010, according to the Lethbridge Herald newspaper, jurors were told Reyat had lied 19 times under oath. On 19 September 2010, Reyat was convicted of perjury.

On 7 January 2011, he was sentenced to 9 years in prison by Justice Mark McEwan, who remarked that Reyat "behaved nothing like a remorseful man unwittingly implicated in mass murder," adding that, "[i]n the witness box, Mr. Reyat behaved like a man still committed to a cause which treated hundreds of men, women and children [as] expendable." In February 2011, Reyat filed an appeal stating that the judge "erred in law, misdirected the jury and failed to tell jurors there was no evidence to support portions of the Crown's closing address," and called it "harsh and excessive," asking for a new trial.

In January 2013, the Supreme Court of Canada rejected Reyat's bid to appeal his perjury conviction. The country's top court did not disclose its reasons as per customary practice.

In March 2014, the British Columbia Court of Appeal dismissed Reyat's appeal that the 9-year length of the sentence, the country's longest sentence for perjury, was unfit. The court ruled the gravity of the perjury in such a case was without comparison.

==== Parole ====
On 28 January 2016, Inderjit Singh Reyat was released on parole. He was released from a halfway house less than 13 months later, on 14 February 2017, with restrictions.

== Mistakes and missed opportunities ==
=== Previous warning ===
The Canadian government had been warned by the Indian R&AW about the possibility of militant bombs aboard Air India flights in Canada, and over two weeks before the crash, CSIS reported to the RCMP that the potential threat to Air India as well as Indian missions in Canada was high.

In June 1985, there was an Air India telex message that suggested planes could be targeted by "time delay devices." Lieutenant-Governor of Ontario James Bartleman also testified that, as a senior intelligence official in the federal Department of External Affairs in 1985, he saw a security "intercept" with a specific warning of a threat against the airline on the weekend of the bombing.

=== Destroyed evidence ===
In his verdict, Justice Ian Josephson cited "unacceptable negligence" by CSIS when hundreds of wiretaps of the suspects and other informants were destroyed. Of the 210 wiretaps that were recorded during the months before and after the bombing, 156 were erased. These tapes continued to be erased even after the militants had become the primary suspects in the bombing.

Because the original wiretap records were erased, they were inadmissible as evidence in court. CSIS claimed the wiretap recordings contained no relevant information, but an RCMP memo states that "There is a strong likelihood that had CSIS retained the tapes between March and August 1985, that a successful prosecution of at least some of principals in both bombings could have been undertaken." "The CSIS investigation was so badly bungled that there was a near mutiny by CSIS officers involved in the probe," said the agent who destroyed the tapes once he had been granted anonymity in January 2000 by Globe and Mail journalists. One agent "said he felt compelled to destroy the tapes (that were in his possession) because he was morally obliged to do everything in his power to protect the safety of his sources. '[I] decided it was a moral issue... If their identity had become known in the Sikh community, they would have been killed. There is no doubt in my mind about that.' "

=== Murdered witnesses ===
Tara Singh Hayer, the publisher of the Indo-Canadian Times and a member of the Order of British Columbia, provided an affidavit to the RCMP in 1995 claiming that he was present during a conversation in which Bagri admitted his involvement in the bombings. While at the London offices of fellow Sikh newspaper publisher Tarsem Singh Purewal, Hayer claimed he overheard a meeting between Purewal and Bagri in which Bagri stated that "if everything had gone as planned the plane would have blown up at Heathrow airport with no passengers on it. But because the plane was a half-hour to three quarters of an hour late, it blew up over the ocean." On 24 January that same year, Purewal was killed near the offices of the Des Pardes newspaper in Southall, England, leaving Hayer as the only other witness.

On 18 November 1998, Hayer was shot dead while getting out of his car in the garage of his home in Surrey, British Columbia. Hayer had survived an earlier attempt on his life in 1988, but was paralyzed and used a wheelchair. As a consequence of his murder, the affidavit was inadmissible as evidence. This was later cited as a reason why the suspects in the bombing were eventually acquitted in 2005.

=== CSIS connection ===
During an interview with Bagri on 28 October 2000, RCMP agents described Surjan Singh Gill as an agent for CSIS, saying the reason that he resigned from the Babbar Khalsa was because his CSIS handlers told him to pull out.

After the subsequent failure of CSIS to stop the bombing of Flight 182, the head of CSIS was replaced by Reid Morden. In an interview for CBC Television's news program The National, Morden claimed that CSIS "dropped the ball" in its handling of the case. A Security Intelligence Review Committee cleared CSIS of any wrongdoing. However, that report remains secret to this day. As of June 2003, the Canadian government continued to insist that there was no mole involved.

== Public inquiry ==
On 1 May 2006, the Crown-in-Council, on the advice of Prime Minister Stephen Harper, announced the launch of a full public inquiry into the bombing, headed by retired Supreme Court Justice John Major, to investigate the events surrounding the bombing and the subsequent investigation, as well as to identify gaps in Canada's security and intelligence system.

Initiated later in June, the Commission of Inquiry into the Investigation of the Bombing of Air India Flight 182 was to examine how Canadian law restricted funding terrorist groups, how well witness protection is provided in terrorist cases, if Canada needed to upgrade its airport security, and if issues of co-operation between the RCMP, CSIS, and other law enforcement agencies had been resolved. It was to also provide a forum wherein families of the victims could testify on the impact of the bombing and would not repeat any criminal trials.

The inquiry's findings were published on 17 June 2010 in its final report, Air India Flight 182: A Canadian Tragedy. The report was 4,000 pages long, with 5 volumes and 64 recommendations. Major concluded that a "cascading series of errors" by Crown ministries, the RCMP, and CSIS allowed the militant attack to take place. He called for the Canadian government's National Security Advisor to be given responsibility for preventing conflict between agencies, as well as calling for a national director of terrorism prosecutions, a new coordinator of witness protection for terrorism cases, and broad changes to close the gaps in airport security.

As per recommendation of the inquiry, Stephen Harper announced in the media, a week after the report and on the 25th anniversary of the disaster, that he would "acknowledge the catastrophic failures of intelligence, policing and air security that led to the bombing, and the prosecutorial lapses that followed" and deliver an apology on behalf of the government of Canada.

== Legacy ==
=== "A Canadian tragedy" ===
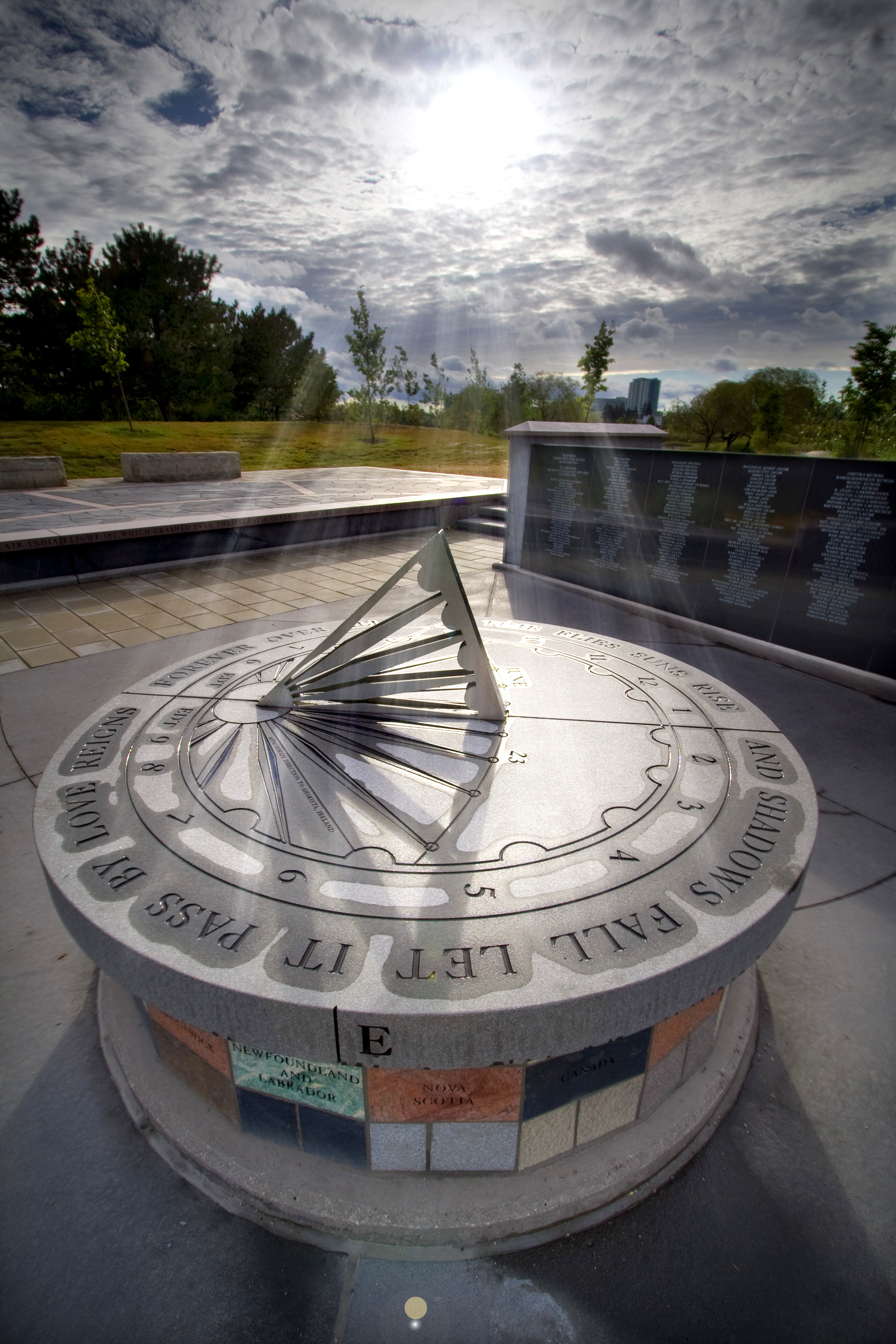
Air India Flight 182 memorial in Toronto, Ontario

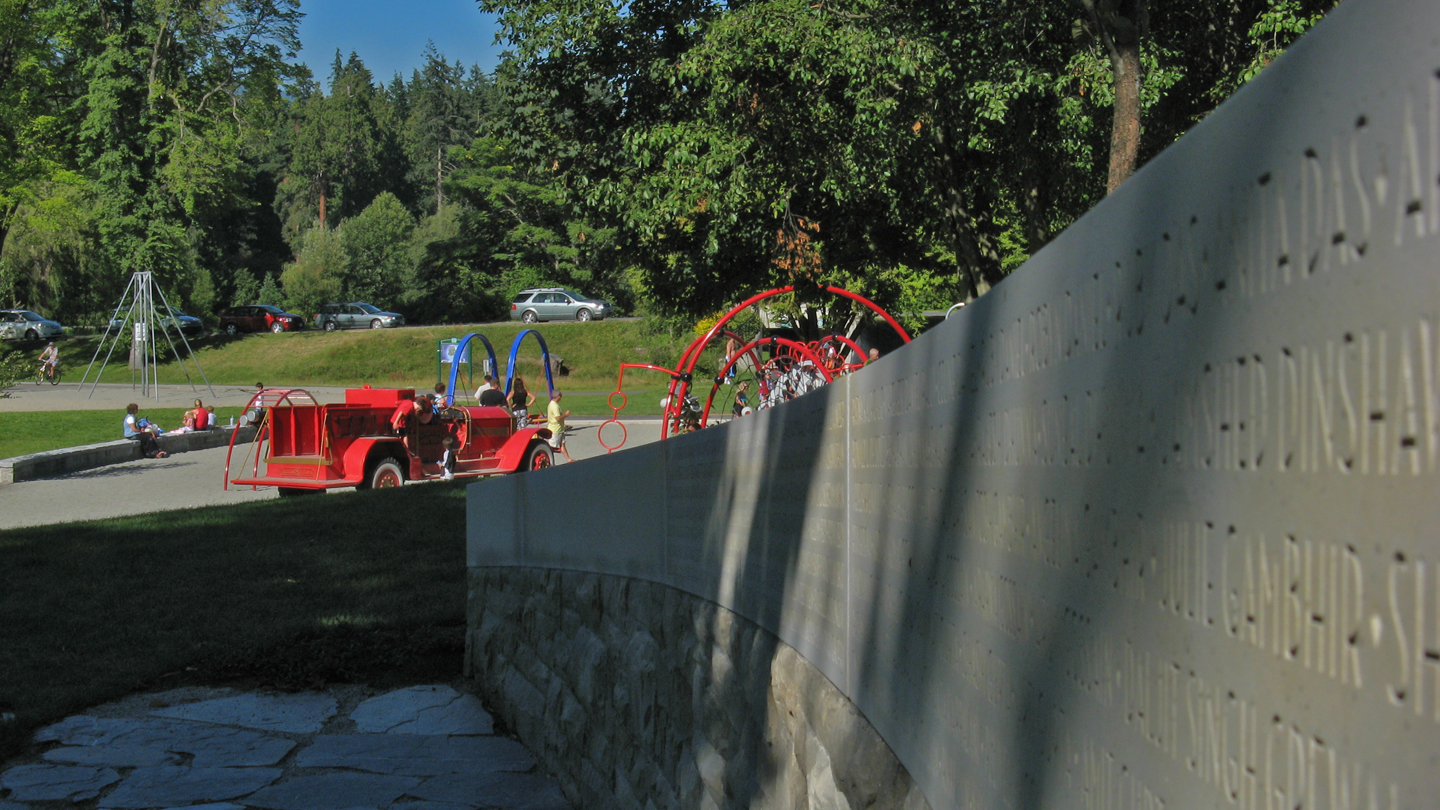
Monument and playground in Stanley Park, Vancouver, commemorating victims of Flight 182, dedicated July 2007

On 23 June 2005, 20 years after the downing of Air India Flight 182, Prime Minister Paul Martin attended a memorial service in Ahakista, West Cork, Ireland, with victims' families to grieve. This would be the first time a Canadian prime minister had visited the Irish memorial, which was built after the bombing. Governor General Adrienne Clarkson, on the advice of Martin, declared the anniversary a national day of mourning. During the anniversary observances, Martin said that the bombing was a Canadian problem, not a foreign problem, saying,

Make no mistake: The flight may have been Air India's, it may have taken place off the coast of Ireland, but this is a Canadian tragedy.

Ujjal Dosanjh, the moderate Sikh who had been attacked in a prelude to the Air India bombing, was by this time a member of Martin's cabinet as federal Minister of Health, and had previously in the interim been Premier of British Columbia.

==== Memorials ====
Memorials were erected in Canada and elsewhere to commemorate the victims. In 1986, a monument was unveiled in Ahakista, Ireland, on the first anniversary of the bombing.

Subsequently, a groundbreaking occurred on 11 August 2006 at a playground that would form part of a memorial in Stanley Park, Vancouver, British Columbia.

Another memorial was unveiled on 22 June 2007 in Humber Bay Park East, Toronto, Ontario; many of the bombing victims had lived in Toronto. The memorial features a sundial, the base of which consists of stones from all provinces and territories of Canada, as well as the countries of the other victims, and a wall, oriented toward Ireland and bearing the names of the dead.

A third Canadian memorial opened in Ottawa in 2014. A fourth memorial was unveiled in Lachine, Montreal on the 26th anniversary of the tragedy. There are no memorials in India as of yet.

In 2024, Khalistani supporters disrupted memorials to the Air India victims, and carried signs promoting the conspiracy theory that the Indian government was involved in the bombing, in close proximity to the victims' families. They occasionally clashed with mourners.

== Public memory ==
=== 2006 ===
Monique Castonguay, whose sister-in-law, Rachelle Castonguay, was one of the murder victims, testified at the public Commission of Inquiry in October 2006. During her testimony, she revealed that many non-Asian Canadians, including journalists, that the family had talked to since the Canadian terrorists had murdered 331 people in the coordinated terrorist bombings 21 years earlier – including 268 Canadian citizens, were surprised to learn that "there were white people on board" Air India Flight 182. Castonguay called this "an example of the racial stereotyping that afflicted many non-Asian Canadians" with regard to the bombings.

=== 2007 ===
In May 2007, Angus Reid Strategies released the results of public opinion polling of whether Canadians viewed the Air India bombing as a Canadian or Indian tragedy and whom they blamed: 48% of respondents considered the bombing as a Canadian event, while 22% thought it was a mostly Indian affair; 34% of those asked felt both CSIS and airport security personnel deserved a great deal of the blame in addition to 27% who believed the RCMP were largely to blame; 18% mentioned Transport Canada.

Ken MacQueen and John Geddes of Maclean's said that the Air India bombing has been referred to as "Canada's 9/11." They disagreed, however, stating the following:

In truth, it was never close to that. The date, 23 June 1985, is not seared into the nation's soul. The events of that day snuffed out hundreds of innocent lives and altered the destinies of thousands more, but it neither shook the foundations of government, nor transformed its policies. It was not, in the main, even officially acknowledged as an act of terrorism.

=== 2023 ===
In 2023, 38 years after the attack, an Angus Reid Institute study discovered that nine out of ten Canadians had little to no knowledge of the attack, and only one in every five Canadians correctly classified the bombing as one of the worst acts of mass murder in Canadian history.

In the study, participants were questioned about their familiarity with the bombs planted by separatist Sikh extremists advocating for a separate Sikh state in Punjab, India. The results indicated that 61% of respondents claimed to have limited knowledge on the matter, while 28% admitted to having no knowledge at all.

According to the study, it appears that the recent attack has had minimal influence on individuals who were born after the Air India bombings. The research reveals that 58% of people aged 35 and younger were unaware of the militant attack altogether. This suggests that only a small portion, around one in 10 respondents, possessed a substantial understanding of the events and their consequences. Among those who were aware, merely 34% correctly acknowledged that the culprits behind the attack were not convicted of murder in a court of law.

=== 2025 ===
In 2025, 40 years after the attack, a poll by the Angus Reid Institute revealed that a majority of Canadians said the attack was not being treated as a "national tragedy".

=== Recognition in media ===
In film and television:

- CBC Television announced the start of filming for Flight 182, a documentary about the tragedy directed by Sturla Gunnarsson. Its title was changed to Air India 182 before premiering at the Hot Docs Canadian International Documentary Festival in Toronto in April 2008. It subsequently premiered on CBC Television in June.
- The crash was featured in season 5 of the Canadian-made, internationally distributed documentary series Mayday, on the episode "Air India: Explosive Evidence".

Many journalists have commented on the bombing throughout the decades since it occurred.

- In 2006, International bestselling author Anita Rau Badami published Can you hear the nightbird call?, a fiction novel that explored the lives and events leading up to the Air India bombing, which incorporated factual details of the tragedy.
- Eight months after the bombing, The Province newspaper reporter Salim Jiwa published Death of Air India Flight 182.
- Loss of Faith: How the Air-India Bombers Got Away With Murder was published by the Vancouver Sun reporter Kim Bolan in May 2005.
- Jiwa and fellow reporter Don Hauka published Margin of Terror: A reporter's twenty-year odyssey covering the tragedies of the Air India bombing in May 2007.
- In her short story, "The Management of Grief," Indian-born American writer Bharati Mukherjee uses fiction to explore the enduring grief of relatives of Air India 182 victims. "The Management of Grief" was originally published in the fiction collection The Middleman and Other Stories. Mukherjee also co-authored The Sorrow and the Terror: The Haunting Legacy of the Air India Tragedy (1987) with her husband, Clark Blaise.
- Inspired by mainstream Canada's cultural denial of the Air India tragedy, Neil Bissoondath wrote The Soul of All Great Designs.
- In 2013, Canadian poet Renée Sarojini Saklikar created a collection of memorial and response poems, Children of Air India: Un/authorized Exhibits and Interjections.
- The Air India bombing is central to the plot of the novel All Inclusive by Toronto-based author Farzana Doctor.
- Dr. Chandra Sankurathri, husband and father of Air India victims, wrote an autobiography called Ray of Hope.
- In 2021, former CBC reporter, Terry Milewski authored, "Blood for Blood: Fifty Years of the Global Khalistan Project", where he extensively examines the worldwide Khalistan movement, its strong desire for retribution, and the inadequate support provided by India's allies in the West. He also outlines the progression and decline of diaspora militants such as Talwinder Singh Parmar.

=== Other recognition ===
The Pada memorial awards at Laurentian University were established in honour of victim Vishnu Pada, the husband of Lata Pada, Indian-born Canadian choreographer and Bharatanatyam dancer.

The University of Manitoba created the Donald George Lougheed Memorial Scholarship in honour of Air India victim Donald George Lougheed. It is awarded to computer engineering students.

Laxminarayan and Padmini Turlapati, the parents of victims Sanjay and Deepak Turlapati, created the Sanjay Deepak Children Trust.

The Sankurathri Foundation was established by Dr. Chandra Sekhar Sankurathri in Kakinada, Andhra Pradesh in memory of his wife Manjari, son Sri Kiran and daughter Sarada, victims of the Air India Flight 182. SF implements educational programs through Sarada Vidyalayam, health care programs through Sri Kiran Institute of Ophthalmology and disaster relief programs through Spandana.

== See also ==
- Airline hijacking:
  - 1971 Indian Airlines hijacking
  - Indian Airlines Flight 814
  - Pan American World Airways Flight 103
  - TWA Flight 847
- 1984 anti-Sikh riots
- Indo-Canadian organized crime
- Sikhism in Canada
- Terrorism in Canada
