= Lakhbir Singh Rode =

Indian Khalistani separatist (c.1952–2023)

Lakhbir Singh Rode (c. 1952 – 1 December 2023) was an Indian Khalistani separatist and the nephew of Jarnail Singh Bhindranwale.

Rode headed the International Sikh Youth Federation (ISYF), which has branches in over a dozen countries in western Europe and Canada. Rode was also affiliated with the Khalistan Zindabad Force. He is also known as Lakhbir Singh, Singh Lakhbir Rode, or Singh Lakhbir. He was suspected to be living in Lahore, Pakistan.

== Biography ==
Rode is said to have been one of the main organisers of a KZF/ISYF cell at Birganj on the India-Nepal border.

In 1998, he was arrested at Teku, near Kathmandu, Nepal, with 20 kg of RDX explosives, and apparently confessed that the RDX was given to him by a councillor in the Pakistani Embassy in Kathmandu.

In July 2007, the investigative weekly Tehelka reported that the militant Talwinder Singh Parmar, in a confession to the Punjab police days before his death on 15 October 1992, had identified Rode as the mastermind behind the Air India 182 bombing on 23 June 1985. However, this has been disputed by Canadian investigators, who say they had talked to Rode and that he is unlikely to be the mastermind behind the plot, now established to have been Talwinder Singh Parmar together with Inderjit Singh Reyat.

Until his death, Rode was sought for trial in India, being wanted for arms smuggling, conspiracy to attack government leaders in New Delhi, and spreading religious hatred in Punjab.

Rode died of a heart attack in Pakistan on 1 December 2023, at the age of 71.
