= Ian Josephson =

Canadian judge

Ian Bruce Josephson is a Justice of the Supreme Court of British Columbia. He gained national attention overseeing the trial of two persons accused of bombing Air India Flight 182, the largest mass-murder in Canadian history.

Josephson articled at the Nelson law firm of Stewart Enderton, and became notable in 1975 for being named a Provincial Court judge at the age of only 29. Nine years later he was named associate chief judge, and in 1988 became chief judge. In 1989 he was appointed to the County Court of Westminster, and in 1990, with the merging of British Columbia's court system, he was renamed as a judge of the province's Supreme Court

In 2012, Ripudaman Singh Malik, a former suspect in the Air India case who was found not guilty by Judge Josephson, wanted the B.C. government to pay for $9.2 million that he had to spend to defend himself in the Air India terrorism case. Malik was shot and killed on July 14, 2022, in Surrey, British Columbia.

Judge Josephson presided over the case of the 1995 Gustafsen Lake Standoff. Calls for a public inquiry were made in response to his sentencing.
