= Surjan Singh Gill =

Canadian terrorism suspect

Surjan Singh Gill was a suspect in the bombing of Air India Flight 182, and has been alleged to have been a possible Canadian Security Intelligence Service (CSIS) informant .

Gill referred to himself by the self-proclaimed title of "Consular General of Khalistan", and was a member of Babbar Khalsa until three days before the bombing. It has been suggested that CSIS wanted to pull "their man" out of the group as soon as they realised that a serious plot was underway and about to take place.

Although a central figure in the investigation, Gill was never charged and disappeared after flying to the United Kingdom.
