= 1985 Narita International Airport bombing =

1985 terrorist attack in Tokyo, Japan

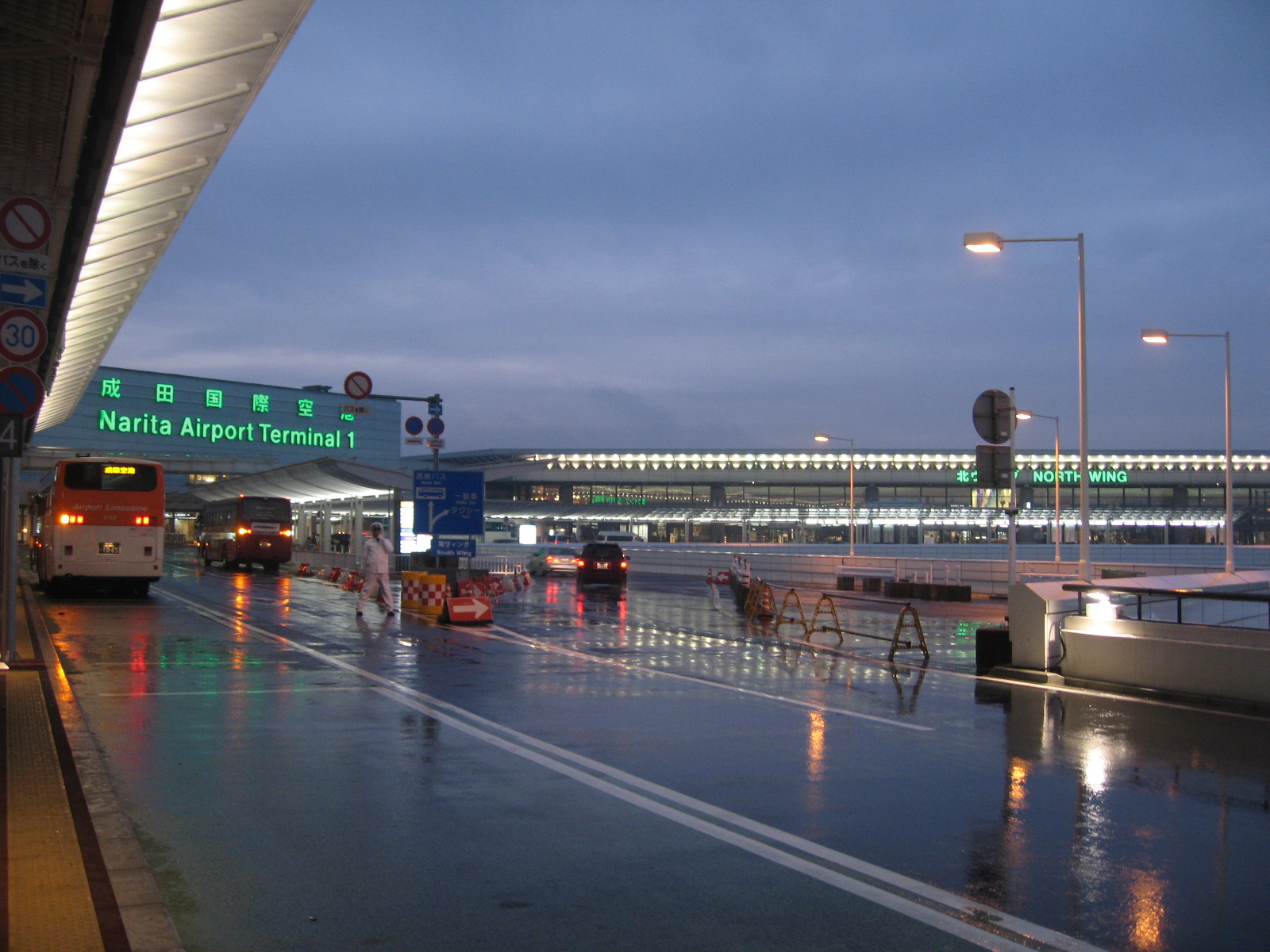
- Narita International Airport, Terminal 1. The main site where the bombings happened.
- Location: Narita International Airport, Greater Tokyo Area, Narita, Chiba, Japan
- Date: June 23, 1985; 15:19 JST (UTC+9)
- Target: Air India Flight 301
- Weapon: Bombs
- Deaths: 2
- Injuries: 4
- Victim: Baggage handlers killed
- Perpetrator: Inderjit Singh Reyat
- Motive: Khalistani terrorism

The 1985 Narita International Airport bombing was the attempted terrorist bombing of Air India Flight 301, which took place on June 23, 1985. A bomb hidden in a suitcase transiting through Narita International Airport, then known as New Tokyo International Airport, exploded at 06:19 in a baggage handling room, killing two baggage handlers and injuring another four. The bomb exploded prematurely while the plane was still grounded. The attack at Narita was part of an attempted double-bombing orchestrated by Talwinder Singh Parmar, a Canadian national, and the Khalistani terrorist organization, Babbar Khalsa. The bombs were made by Inderjit Singh Reyat.

The suitcase bomb originated in Vancouver, Canada, and arrived in Tokyo on CP Air Flight 003. It was transiting Narita Airport to be loaded onto Air India Flight 301, which flew from Tokyo to Bangkok and then on to Delhi, India.

The initial plan was for the Air India Flight 301 bomb to explode at the same time as the one that had been planted aboard Air India Flight 182. However, Flight 182's bomb exploded over the Atlantic Ocean off the southwest tip of the coast of Ireland, just one hour after 301's bomb, because the plan had failed to take into account that Japan did not observe daylight saving time. As a result the bomb at the Narita Airport exploded while 301 was still grounded, earlier than the perpetrators had planned. Had the plan worked the bomb would have exploded inside Air India Flight 301 on its way to Bangkok instead of inside the airport.

Extensive analysis by the Japanese investigators identified bomb parts through serial numbers and narrowed the pieces to less than 2000 possible electronic tuners of an older model shipped to Vancouver, Canada, allowing Canadian police to identify a single person who had bought this older model recently. At the same time in the inquiry to the Air India Flight 182 bombing, investigators had identified that the man checked-in luggage without boarding the plane. Inderjit Singh Reyat, who lived in Duncan, British Columbia, was convicted in a Canadian court. He was found guilty in 1991 of the Narita bombing. In 2003, shortly before the start of the Air India trial, he made a plea bargain on reduced charges and a promise of testimony against other suspects. He made the bombs used in both attacks.

== Timeline of the incident ==
On 22 June 1985, the bags of a passenger named L. Singh were checked in at Vancouver for Canadian Pacific Airlines (CP Air) 003 to New Tokyo International Airport in Narita, Japan, near Tokyo. This bag was interlined to Air India Flight 301 leaving for Don Mueang International Airport in Bangkok, Thailand. L. Singh was assigned seat 38H.

At 20:37 UTC, CP Air Flight 003 (named Empress of Australia), departed Vancouver; no L. Singh was on board.

At 05:41 UTC (now June 23), CP Air 003 arrived in Tokyo Narita 14 minutes early.

At 06:19 UTC, a piece of luggage that had come from CP Air 3 exploded as it was being transferred to Air India Flight 301; the explosion killed two Japanese baggage handlers (Hideo Asano and Hideharu Koda) in Narita Airport and injured four other people.

At 07:14 UTC, Air India Flight 182 exploded in mid-air off the west coast of Ireland, falling into the sea. All 329 people on board were killed. Investigation by Canada has revealed connections between the two bombings.

At 08:05 UTC, Air India Flight 301 left Narita and arrived in Thailand unscathed and with no incidents.

February 1988 – Inderjit Singh Reyat is arrested by West Midlands Police in Coventry, United Kingdom.

8 December 1989 – The British government agrees to extradite Reyat to Canada, following a lengthy court battle and trial.

10 May 1991 – Inderjit Singh Reyat receives a ten-year sentence after being convicted of two counts of manslaughter terms and four explosives charges relating to the Narita Airport 1985 bombing.

== Second bombing ==
Fifty-five minutes after, at 08:14 Irish time, Air India Flight 182 exploded mid-air and plunged into the Atlantic Ocean off the west coast of Ireland, killing 329 people. Canadian security forces believe that the incidents were related, as noted in a 2010 report by a government commission. They were supposedly both developed by Babbar Khalsa, the Sikh separatist group operating in Canada. Investigators believe the bombings were intended to be simultaneous, but the terrorist planners were not aware that while Canada observes daylight saving time, Japan does not.

== Trials ==
The trial for the Narita bombing took place in Canada in 1991. The only man convicted of any involvement in the bombings was Inderjit Singh Reyat, a British Columbia resident who had built the bombs used. He received a ten-year sentence of two counts of manslaughter and four explosives charges after being found guilty in May 1991 of the Narita bombing in federal court in Vancouver, British Columbia.

In 2003, weeks before the start of the Air India Flight 182 trial, Reyat made a deal with prosecutors. In exchange for pleading guilty to the charge of manslaughter in the Flight 182 bombing, he was sentenced to five years in prison. He also had to testify against the two other men tried in Canada for these incidents, Ripudaman Singh Malik and Ajaib Singh Bagri. Justice Ian Josephson acquitted them, as he believed that the prosecutors had not been able to meet the standard of proof "beyond a reasonable doubt."

In reading the verdicts of Malik and Bagri, Justice Josephson commented about Reyat's testimony at their trial:

Even the most sympathetic of listeners could only conclude, as do I, that his evidence was patently and pathetically fabricated in an attempt to minimize his involvement in his crime to an extreme degree, while refusing to reveal relevant information he clearly possesses. His hollow expression of remorse for his crime must have been a bitter pill for the families of the victims.

In 2006 Crown Counsel in British Columbia announced they would be charging Reyat with perjury, based on his testimony at the Air India Flight 182 trial. It is alleged that he committed perjury 27 times during his testimony. In 2008, the court granted bail; he had already served 20 years in jail since his first arrest. The trial on perjury charges was scheduled for 2009. He was convicted of perjury in 2011 and sentenced to nine years, with 17 months' credit for time already served.
