= Street Legal (Canadian TV series) =

Canadian legal drama television series

- Genre: Legal drama
- Starring: Sonja Smits; C. David Johnson; Eric Peterson; Cynthia Dale
- Country of origin: Canada
- No. of seasons: 9
- No. of episodes: 132

Production
- Running time: 60 minutes
- Production company: Canadian Broadcasting Corporation

Original release
- Network: CBC Television
- Release: January 6, 1987 – April 8, 2019

Street Legal is a Canadian legal drama television series that aired on CBC Television from 1987 to 1994, followed twenty-five years later by a six-episode season with a substantially different cast. Street Legal was the longest-running one-hour scripted drama in the history of Canadian television, holding the record for twenty years before being surpassed by the 139th episode of Heartland on March 29, 2015.

== Synopsis ==
Street Legal focused on the professional and private lives of the partners in a small Toronto law firm. The primary stars were Sonja Smits, Eric Peterson and C. David Johnson. The cast also included Julie Khaner, Albert Schultz, Cynthia Dale, Maria del Mar, Ron Lea, Anthony Sherwood and Diane Polley.

The series was distinctively Canadian, particularly in the use of Canadian court customs and procedures. Much of the show's music was composed by Eric Robertson who was nominated for a Gemini Award in 1987 for his work on the show.

== Cast and characters ==
In the early episodes, the show's three core characters were Carrie Barr (Smits), Leon Robinovitch (Peterson) and Chuck Tchobanian (Johnson), partners in the small downtown Toronto law firm of Barr, Robinovitch and Tchobanian. The three did not necessarily always see eye to eye on things: Tchobanian was a flashy, confident and conservative lawyer who was most interested in taking high-profile cases that would get his name into the media; Robinovitch was an activist labour lawyer who believed in defending the little guy and mounted a campaign for Mayor of Toronto during the series run; Barr was a soft-spoken and initially naïve young lawyer who was sometimes forced to mediate between her more opinionated partners. According to series producer Maryke McEwen, "if you want to label the characters I'd call them Liberal, Conservative and NDP."

Characters introduced later included Mercedes (Sealy-Smith), the firm's no-nonsense office manager; Olivia Novak (Dale), an aggressive, risk-taking new lawyer with the firm who was a foil for Carrie and a love interest for Chuck; Alana Newman (Khaner), a judge who was married to Leon; Rob Diamond (Schultz), who joined the firm as a junior lawyer; Dillon Beck (Sherwood), a crown prosecutor who married Carrie; and Laura Crosby (del Mar), a new lawyer who joined the firm after Carrie was killed by a drunk driver.

In the 2019 revival, Olivia loses her job with a Bay Street firm, and joins RDL Legal, a boutique firm with whom she was formerly competing to land a major case.

=== Original cast ===
- Sonja Smits as Carrington "Carrie" Barr (Seasons 1-6)
- C. David Johnson as Charles "Chuck" Tchobanian (Seasons 1-8)
- Eric Peterson as Leon Robinovitch (Seasons 1-8)
- Cynthia Dale as Olivia Novak (Seasons 3-8)
- David James Elliott as Nick Del Gado (Seasons 3-5)
- Julie Khaner as Alana Newman Robinovitch (Seasons 4-8)
- Anthony Sherwood as Dillon Beck (Seasons 4-8)
- Albert Schultz as Rob Diamond (recurring Season 6, regular Seasons 7-8)
- Maria del Mar as Laura Crosby (Seasons 7-8)
- Ron Lea as Brian Malony (Season 8)
- Alison Sealy-Smith as Mercedes (occasional Seasons 6-7, regular Season 8)

=== 2019 revival cast ===
- Cynthia Dale as Olivia Novak
- Cara Ricketts as Lilly Rue
- Steve Lund as Adam Darling
- Yvonne Chapman as Mina Lee
- Jo Vannicola as Sam
- Emmanuel Kabongo as Roman Mussi
- Patrick Labbé as Derek Leiber

== Show history ==
The original series pilot aired on CBC Television in 1986 as Shellgame, a television film written by William Deverell which starred Brenda Robins as a lawyer defending accused murderer André (Germain Houde). The film was not well received by audiences or critics, however, and the project was retooled and recast before premiering as a series in 1987.

The series debuted on January 6, 1987, with a six-episode run that season. Maryke McEwen was the executive producer. Early critical response to the series frequently compared it to the contemporaneous American series L.A. Law, with some reviewers even coining the dismissive epithet T.O. Law. The series then returned for a longer second season in September 1987.

From the third through the seventh seasons, Brenda Greenberg was first senior producer, then executive producer, with Nada Harcourt taking over for the final season.

The show's last regular weekly episode aired on February 18, 1994.

Production wrapped up with the two-hour television film Last Rights, which aired on November 6, 1994. Loosely based on the case of Sue Rodriguez, an assisted suicide activist who died a week before Street Legal's final regular episode aired, the film centred on Olivia's criminal trial after helping a terminally ill friend (Brent Carver) commit suicide. The film drew 1.6 million viewers.

== Revival ==
The concept for a 2019 revival of Street Legal was first discussed during a lunch including Cynthia Dale and Sally Catto, CBC's general manager of programming. During a subsequent lunch, producer Bernie Zukerman and Catto began to plan specifics for a relaunch. The revival centres on Olivia Novak (Dale), joining a small boutique law office, RDL Legal, after losing her job with a powerful Bay Street firm. In addition to Dale reprising her original role, the cast also includes Cara Ricketts, Steve Lund and Yvonne Chapman. Eric Peterson and Anthony Sherwood made guest appearances reprising their roles as Leon Robinovitch and Dillon Beck, but were not part of the full-time cast. Actors Allan Hawco, Patrick Labbé, Leni Parker, Rosemary Dunsmore and Tom McCamus also appeared in supporting roles.

The new season of six episodes premiered on March 4, 2019, on CBC Television. After each episode was broadcast, it also became available for viewing on the CBC Gem streaming service. The primary theme of the six episodes is the opioid crisis in Canada, including a class action lawsuit against a major pharmaceutical company that manufactures a highly addictive drug.

In April 2019, the CBC announced that the reboot would not be renewed for a second season. The ninth season premiered on June 21, 2021, on Ovation in the United States and was also released on the Ovation NOW app streaming service in the "Mystery Alley" channel section early before its premiere.

== Episodes ==
Season	Episodes	Originally released	
Season	Episodes	First released	Last released
1	6	January 6, 1987	February 17, 1987
2	13	September 27, 1987	December 30, 1987
3	19	October 7, 1988	February 24, 1989
4	16	October 13, 1989	February 9, 1990
5	16	October 5, 1990	February 1, 1991
6	18	October 4, 1991	January 31, 1992
7	18	October 4, 1992	January 31, 1993
8	20	October 8, 1993	November 6, 1994
9	6	March 4, 2019	April 8, 2019

=== Season 1 (1987) ===
No. overall	No. in season	Title	Directed by	Written by	Original release date
1	1	"Birds of a Feather"	Alan Erlich	Tom Scheinbeck	January 6, 1987
Carrie, Chuck, and Leon try to maintain their practice after losing their most lucrative accounts.
2	2	"Even Lawyers Sing the Blues"	Randy Bradshaw	Don Truckey, Larry Gaynor	January 13, 1987
Leon tries to help an old girlfriend whose illegitimate daughter was fathered by a prominent member of the parliament.
3	3	"A Little Knowledge"	Marc Strange	Ian Sutherland	January 20, 1987
Carrie represents a man accused of killing his wife, but soon finds out about his motives for hiring her.
4	4	"Sting Like a Butterfly"	Sturla Gunnarsson	Don Truckey	January 27, 1987
Chuck's lack of knowledge poses a problem for backing the comeback of an aging boxer.
5	5	"Matter of Honour"	Mort Ransen	Marc Strange	February 10, 1987
Chuck represents a 12-year-old boy who is accused of murdering his stepfather, and who witnessed the suspicious death of his father.
6	6	"Tango Bellarosa"	Randy Bradshaw	Ian Adams, Marc Strange	February 17, 1987
A shocked Carrie learns that the client applying for U.S. citizenship identifies the immigration official as an Argentine torturer.

=== Season 2 (1987) ===
No. overall	No. in season	Title	Directed by	Written by	Original release date
7	1	"Baby Talk"	Randy Bradshaw	David Cole	September 27, 1987
Carrie represents a surrogate lesbian mother who chooses to keep the baby.
8	2	"Assault"	Eleanore Lindo	Don Truckey	September 30, 1987
A client's husband, charged with wife beating, sexually assaults Carrie.
9	3	"Desperate Alibi"	Alan Erlich	Paul Aitken	October 7, 1987
Chuck represents a teen accused of killing a gay man who refuses to disclose the names of the real attackers.
10	4	"Judgement Call"	Allan Kroeker	Marc Strange	October 14, 1987
The suicide of Carrie's client strikes her with guilt.
11	5	"Fever of the Blood"	Steve DiMarco	Brian Kit McLeod	October 21, 1987
Leon represents a doctor charged with negligence.
12	6	"Star Struck"	Allan Kroeker	Don Truckey	October 28, 1987
Leon's client fights to reclaim her medical research from an American company who intends to use it for a Star Wars program.
13	7	"Mr. Nice Guy"	Don McCutcheon	David Cole	November 4, 1987
Carrie tries to save the lives of her client's family.
14	8	"Just One Kiss"	Paul Shapiro	Robert Sandler	November 18, 1987
Chuck is accused of sleeping with a client's wife.
15	9	"Romeo and Carol"	Eleanore Lindo	Malcolm MacRury, Don Truckey, Paul Aitken, Peter Mitchell	November 25, 1987
Leon represents a mentally-handicapped couple who are forbidden from living together.
16	10	"Lost and Lonely Hearts"	James Swan	Jerome McCann	December 2, 1987
Chuck's client sues her dating service.
17	11	"Take My Jokes, Please"	Alan Simmonds	Malcolm MacRury	December 16, 1987
Leon represents a comic in a divorce case.
18	12	"Gold Rush"	Eleanore Lindo	Don Truckey	December 23, 1987
Chuck is involved in a shady gold-mining company.
19	13	"I'll Be Home for Christmas"	Randy Bradshaw	David Cole	December 30, 1987
Leon represents an old client accused of destroying a Christmas display.

=== Season 3 (1988–89) ===
No. overall	No. in season	Title	Directed by	Written by	Original release date
20	1	"A Powerful Prison Story"	Brad Turner	Malcolm MacRury, Don Truckey, Paul Aitken, Peter Mitchell	October 7, 1988
21	2	"The Waiting Chair"	Alan Simmonds	Malcolm MacRury, Don Truckey, Paul Aitken, Peter Mitchell	October 14, 1988
22	3	"Elliot vs. McTavish"	Alan Simmonds	Malcolm MacRury, Don Truckey, Paul Aitken, Peter Mitchell	October 21, 1988
23	4	"State of Mind"	Stefan Scaini	Malcolm MacRury, Don Truckey, Paul Aitken, Peter Mitchell	October 28, 1988
24	5	"The Homecoming"	Brad Turner	Malcolm MacRury, Paul Aitken, Peter Mitchell	November 4, 1988
25	6	"Mondo Condo"	Eleanore Lindo	Malcolm MacRury, Don Truckey, Paul Aitken, Peter Mitchell	November 11, 1988
26	7	"Murder by Video"	Brad Turner	Robert Sandler	November 18, 1988
27	8	"Whose Woods Are These"	Stefan Scaini, Beverley Cooper	Robert Sandler	November 25, 1988
28	9	"Act of Silence"	Steve DiMarco	Malcolm MacRury, Don Truckey, Jerome McCann	December 2, 1988
29	10	"Equal Partners"	Stacey Stewart Curtis	Malcolm MacRury, Leila Basen	December 9, 1988
30	11	"Cat and Mouse"	Richard Benner	Barry Stevens	December 16, 1988
31	12	"Basketball Story"	Gilbert M. Shilton	Malcolm MacRury, Paul Aitken, Peter Mitchell	January 6, 1989
32	13	"Principles"	Allan Harmon	Malcolm MacRury, Paul Aitken, Peter Mitchell, Ian Sutherland, William Kuhns	January 13, 1989
33	14	"Brotherhoods"	Peter Yalden-Thompson	Rebecca Schechter	January 20, 1989
34	15	"Beauties and Beasts"	Eleanore Lindo	Katherine Neilsen	January 27, 1989
35	16	"In Search of a Dream"	Stefan Scaini	Malcolm MacRury, Drew Hayden Taylor	February 3, 1989
36	17	"Slipping Through the Cracks"	Richard Benner	Peter Lauterman, Angelo Stea	February 10, 1989
37	18	"Conflict of Interest"	Stacey Stewart Curtis	Rebecca Schechter	February 17, 1989
38	19	"World-Class City"	Stefan Scaini	Barry Stevens	February 24, 1989

=== Season 4 (1989–90) ===
No. overall	No. in season	Title	Directed by	Written by	Original release date
39	1	"Soul Custody"	Gilbert M. Shilton	Guy Mullally, Richard Oleksiak	October 13, 1989
40	2	"Partners and Other Strangers"	Brad Turner	Peter Lauterman, Angelo Stea	October 20, 1989
41	3	"Without Prejudice"	Gilbert M. Shilton	Guy Mullally, Barry Stevens	October 27, 1989
42	4	"See No Evil"	Jorge Montesi	Guy Mullally, Rebecca Schechter	November 3, 1989
43	5	"The Cradle Will Rock"	Stefan Scaini	Malcolm MacRury	November 10, 1989
44	6	"Complex Offer"	Allan Harmon	Guy Mullally, John Nicolls	November 17, 1989
45	7	"Film Noir"	Eleanore Lindo	Guy Mullally, Richard Oleksiak	November 24, 1989
46	8	"Confession"	Brad Turner	Guy Mullally, Paul Aitken	December 1, 1989
47	9	"Home"	Steve DiMarco	Guy Mullally, Roy Sallows	December 8, 1989
48	10	"Blue Collar"	Allan Harmon	Barry Stevens	December 15, 1989
49	11	"Security Exchange"	Stacey Stewart Curtis	Guy Mullally, Robert Sandler	January 5, 1990
50	12	"The Bracelet"	Sturla Gunnarsson	Guy Mullally, Michael Leo Donovan	January 12, 1990
51	13	"Leon's Story"	Bruce Pittman	Guy Mullally, Robin White	January 19, 1990
52	14	"Wedding"	Stacey Stewart Curtis	Malcolm MacRury	January 26, 1990
53	15	"Godfather of Mimico"	Michael Franks	Guy Mullally, Peter Lauterman, Angelo Stea	February 2, 1990
54	16	"Suite Sixteen"	Stefan Scaini	Guy Mullally	February 9, 1990

=== Season 5 (1990–91) ===
No. overall	No. in season	Title	Directed by	Written by	Original release date
55	1	"Holy Thursday"	Allan Harmon	Guy Mullally	October 5, 1990
56	2	"Spare Parts"	George Bloomfield	Guy Mullally, Robert Sandler	October 12, 1990
57	3	"Double Agenda"	Brad Turner	Guy Mullally, Barry Stevens, Richard Oleksiak	October 19, 1990
58	4	"Shadow Boxing"	Jorge Montesi	Guy Mullally, Rebecca Schechter	October 26, 1990
59	5	"Standard of Care"	Eleanore Lindo	Guy Mullally, Barry Stevens	November 2, 1990
60	6	"The Psychic"	Randy Bradshaw	Guy Mullally, Paul Aitken	November 9, 1990
61	7	"Softsell"	Mitchell Gabourie	Guy Mullally, Peter Lauterman, Angelo Stea	November 16, 1990
62	8	"Divine Image"	Stacey Stewart Curtis	Guy Mullally, Barry Stevens	November 23, 1990
63	9	"Sanctuary"	Stefan Scaini	Guy Mullally, Catherine Denson	November 30, 1990
64	10	"Lies"	Douglas Jackson	Guy Mullally, Barry Stevens, Sammi Fareed Ahmed	December 7, 1990
65	11	"Tyger, Tyger"	Allan Harmon	Guy Mullally, Gary Freedman	December 14, 1990
66	12	"Murder"	Stacey Stewart Curtis	Guy Mullally, Toby Mullally	January 4, 1991
67	13	"The Cookies Crumble"	Douglas Jackson	Guy Mullally, A.J. Bickerton, Neil Kozloff, Michael Betcherman	January 11, 1991
68	14	"The Prosecution"	Stacey Stewart Curtis	Guy Mullally, Rebecca Schechter	January 18, 1991
69	15	"Election Day"	Eleanore Lindo	Guy Mullally, Barry Stevens	January 25, 1991
70	16	"The Truth"	George Bloomfield	Catherine Denson	February 1, 1991

=== Season 6 (1991–92) ===
No. overall	No. in season	Title	Directed by	Written by	Original release date
71	1	"The Legacy of Stanley Wall"	Stacey Stewart Curtis	Guy Mullally, Sondra Kelly	October 4, 1991
TBA	2	"The Harley"	George Bloomfield	Guy Mullally, Barry Stevens	October 11, 1991
72	3	"Presumed Toxic"	Stacey Stewart Curtis	Guy Mullally, Rebecca Schechter	October 18, 1991
73	4	"Reasonable Doubt"	George Bloomfield	Guy Mullally, Sondra Kelly	October 25, 1991
74	5	"Shades of Difference"	Brad Turner	Guy Mullally, Sondra Kelly, A.J. Bickerton, Neil Kozloff	November 1, 1991
75	6	"Questions of Dignity"	Stacey Stewart Curtis	Guy Mullally, Bruce Martin	November 8, 1991
76	7	"Sing for Me, Olivia"	Eleanore Lindo	Guy Mullally, Sondra Kelly, Gary Freedman	November 15, 1991
77	8	"Keeping Secrets"	Stacey Stewart Curtis	Guy Mullally, Catherine Denson	November 22, 1991
78	9	"The Good Lawyer"	Eleanore Lindo	Guy Mullally, Toby Mullally	November 29, 1991
79	10	"Hollywood North"	George Bloomfield	Guy Mullally, Rebecca Schechter	November 29, 1991
80	11	"Eye of the Beholder"	Allan Harmon	Guy Mullally, Sondra Kelly	December 6, 1991
81	12	"Too Many Cooks"	George Bloomfield	Guy Mullally, Leila Basen	December 13, 1991
83	13	"On Women and Independence"	Steve DiMarco	Guy Mullally, Sondra Kelly, Barry Stevens, Gary Freedman	December 20, 1991
84	14	"Children's Hour"	Stefan Scaini	Guy Mullally, Rebecca Schechter	January 6, 1992
85	15	"Breach of Trust"	Steve DiMarco	Guy Mullally, A.J. Bickerton, Neil Kozloff	January 10, 1992
86	16	"November"	Stefan Scaini	Guy Mullally, Toby Mullally	January 17, 1992
87	17	"After the Fall"	Stacey Stewart Curtis	Guy Mullally, Sondra Kelly, Rebecca Schechter	January 24, 1992
88	18	"The Phoenix"	Stacey Stewart Curtis	Guy Mullally, Sondra Kelly, Rebecca Schechter	January 31, 1992

=== Season 7 (1992–93) ===
No. overall	No. in season	Title	Directed by	Written by	Original release date
89	1	"BRT and Associates: A New Beginning"	Stacey Stewart Curtis	Guy Mullally, Sondra Kelly	October 30, 1992
90	2	"Affairs of the Heart"	Eleanore Lindo	Guy Mullally, Sondra Kelly	November 6, 1992
91	3	"Break-ups and Mergers"	Stacey Stewart Curtis	Guy Mullally, Sondra Kelly, Bruce Martin	November 13, 1992
92	4	"Persistence of Vision"	Stefan Scaini	Guy Mullally, Sondra Kelly, Leila Basen	November 20, 1992
93	5	"It's a Wise Child"	Stacey Stewart Curtis	Guy Mullally, Sondra Kelly, A.J. Bickerton, Neil Kozloff	November 27, 1992
94	6	"Rules of the Game"	Steve DiMarco	Guy Mullally, Sondra Kelly, Bruce Martin	December 4, 1992
95	7	"Never Say Die"	Allan Harmon	Guy Mullally, Sondra Kelly, Michael Betcherman	December 11, 1992
96	8	"Lefter Than Thou"	Milan Cheylov	Guy Mullally, Sondra Kelly, Barry Stevens	December 18, 1992
97	9	"Believe the Children"	Stefan Scaini	Guy Mullally, Sondra Kelly, Paul Ledoux	January 1, 1993
98	10	"Thicker Than Water"	Allan Harmon	Guy Mullally, Sondra Kelly, Giles Blunt	January 8, 1993
99	11	"Best Interest of the Child"	Milan Cheylov	Guy Mullally, Sondra Kelly, James Nadler	January 15, 1993
100	12	"Pride and Prejudice"	Harvey Frost	Guy Mullally, Sondra Kelly, Michael Betcherman	January 22, 1993
101	13	"Forgiveness"	Eleanore Lindo	Guy Mullally, Sondra Kelly, Maureen McKeon	January 29, 1993
102	14	"Sex and Death"	Stacey Stewart Curtis	Guy Mullally, Sondra Kelly, Barry Stevens	February 5, 1993
103	15	"Conduct Unbecoming"	Milan Cheylov	Guy Mullally, Sondra Kelly, James Nadler	February 12, 1993
104	16	"The Price"	Stacey Stewart Curtis	Guy Mullally, Sondra Kelly, Maureen McKeon	February 19, 1993
105	17	"Strange Bedfellows"	Steve DiMarco	Guy Mullally, Sondra Kelly, Maureen McKeon	February 26, 1993
106	18	"Faking It"	Stacey Stewart Curtis	Guy Mullally, Sondra Kelly, Maureen McKeon	March 5, 1993

=== Season 8 (1993–94) ===
No. overall	No. in season	Title	Directed by	Written by	Original release date
107	1	"Strictly Business"	Milan Cheylov	Sondra Kelly, Maureen McKeon	October 8, 1993
108	2	"Hasta La Vista"	Harvey Frost	Sondra Kelly, Maureen McKeon, Ann MacNaughton	October 15, 1993
109	3	"Truth or Dare"	Milan Cheylov	Sondra Kelly, Maureen McKeon, Donald Martin	October 22, 1993
110	4	"But Not Forgotten"	Stacey Stewart Curtis	Sondra Kelly, Dave Cole, Maureen McKeon, A.J. Bickerton, Neil Kozloff	October 29, 1993
111	5	"Black and White in Color"	Harvey Frost	Sondra Kelly, Dave Cole, Michael Betcherman	November 5, 1993
112	6	"Fit Punishment"	Milan Cheylov	Sondra Kelly, Dave Cole, Maureen McKeon, David Barlow	November 12, 1993
113	7	"What's Love Got to Do with It?"	Stefan Scaini	Dave Cole, Rebecca Schechter	November 19, 1993
114	8	"Truth, Lies and Consequences"	Harvey Frost	Guy Mullally, Sondra Kelly, Dave Cole, Donald Martin	November 26, 1993
115	9	"Do the Right Thing"	Milan Cheylov	Dave Cole, Maureen McKeon, Michael Betcherman	December 3, 1993
116	10	"Feared by the Bad, Loved by the Good"	Stefan Scaini	Dave Cole	December 10, 1993
117	11	"The Cost of Love"	Harvey Frost	Dave Cole, Maureen McKeon	December 17, 1993
118	12	"Fair Is Foul"	Stacey Stewart Curtis	Dave Cole, Rebecca Schechter	January 7, 1994
119	13	"The Firm"	Steve DiMarco	Dave Cole, Maureen McKeon, Hart Hanson	January 14, 1994
120	14	"Persons Living or Dead"	Harvey Frost	Dave Cole	January 21, 1994
121	15	"Crossroads"	Milan Cheylov	Dave Cole, Maureen McKeon, Paul Hay	January 28, 1994
122	16	"The Morning After"	Steve DiMarco	Dave Cole, Ann MacNaughton	February 4, 1994
123	17	"No Holds Barred"	Milan Cheylov	Dave Cole, Maureen McKeon	February 11, 1994
124	18	"The Long and Winding Road"	Stacey Stewart Curtis	Dave Cole	February 18, 1994
125	19	"Last Rites: Part 1"	Stacey Stewart Curtis	Maureen McKeon, David Barlow	November 6, 1994
126	20	"Last Rites: Part 2"	Stacey Stewart Curtis	Maureen McKeon, David Barlow	November 6, 1994

=== Season 9 (2019) ===
No. overall	No. in season	Title	Directed by	Written by	Original release date	Canada viewers (millions)
127	1	"Glass Floor"	Sturla Gunnarsson	Bruce M. Smith	March 4, 2019	0.37
128	2	"Moving Day"	Sturla Gunnarsson	Lynne Kamm, Deborah Nathan	March 11, 2019	0.34
129	3	"Neighbours"	Sturla Gunnarsson	Nikolijne Troubetzkoy	March 18, 2019	0.30
130	4	"Homecoming"	Chloé Robichaud	Nicolas Billon	March 25, 2019	0.20
131	5	"Cracks"	Chloé Robichaud	Lynne Kamm	April 1, 2019	0.27
132	6	"Leap"	Chloé Robichaud	Bruce M. Smith	April 8, 2019	0.25

=== Production ===
The creators of the 2019 series were Bruce M. Smith and Bernie Zukerman. Smith and Zukerman were also the executive producers. The series was co-produced by IGP Productions and Broken Clown Company. Cynthia Dale and Rayne Zukerman were producers. Filming of the six episodes was completed primarily in Montreal with some work done in Toronto.
