= Diplomatic Immunity (1991 Canadian film) =

- Directed by: Sturla Gunnarsson
- Written by: Steve Lucas
- Produced by: Sturla Gunnarsson; Steve Lucas
- Starring: Wendel Meldrum; Ofelia Medina; Michael Hogan
- Edited by: Jeff Warren
- Distributed by: Astral Films (Canada); Alliance Films (United States)
- Release date: 4 October 1991
- Running time: 93 minutes
- Country: Canada
- Language: English
- Budget: $2.68 million

Diplomatic Immunity is a Canadian political thriller film, released in 1991. It marked the narrative feature film debut of Sturla Gunnarsson.

== Plot ==
Kim Dades, a Canadian diplomat working in El Salvador on a foreign aid program, who discovers that a community housing project paid for by the Canadian government has been overrun by the Salvadoran army.

== Production ==
=== Development ===
Sturla Gunnarsson and Steve Lucas met each other in 1978, and created After the Axe. In 1980, Gunnarsson met a refugee who fled Augusto Pinochet's Chile after being tortured. Gunnarsson met other Latin American refugees torture victims, including a Salvadoran woman, which inspired him to make a documentary entitled Torture. Elements of the Salvadoran woman's story were included in the final product.

The film was in development hell for nine years. Gunnarsson and Lucas received a $3,000 grant from the National Film Board of Canada's Ontario region in 1981, to determine if they could make the film. They submitted a 90 page report in June 1981, but the NFB's Ontario region declined to invest in the film. They turned to the NFB's Studio B and received support from Peter Katadotis, the head of English-language production, and Robert Verrall. Gunnarsson and Lucas received $20,000 in funding to continue research.

Gunnarsson and Lucas travelled to Mexico City, where they spent four months, in February 1983. They learned Spanish and met leaders of the Farabundo Martí National Liberation Front. The setting of the film changed from South America, to Central America, and then to a fictional country. The Department of External Affairs gave them access to the Canadian embassy in Mexico City. Claudette Deschenes, the embassy's immigration officer, organized a trip to El Salvador after Canada started accepting refugees from the country.

=== Financing ===
After the Axe was nominated at the 55th Academy Awards. Paramount Pictures and Columbia Pictures offered Gunnarsson and Lucas development deals worth $20,000-25,000. They turned down the offer, but they regretted it, with Lucas stating it was "a bit stupid", as the film would have been made six year earlier and had distribution if they accepted according to Gunnarsson. The NFB was unable to financially support the project due to numerous cost overruns, including The Wars.

Gunnarsson and Lucas formed Metropolis Motion Pictures in February 1984, and Bob Linnell, of the Canadian Film Development Corporation, gave them $15,000 to write a first draft. Lucas wrote the draft over the course of six months and under the titles of Torture and Strictly Business. Linnell gave them $27,000 to write another draft, but Gunnarsson and Lucas did not like either draft. Jim Burt, an executive at the Canadian Broadcasting Corporation, gave financial support to the project as the CFDC could not fund 100% of development costs. The third draft was written under the title Vested Interests and Gunnarsson said it was "the worst of them all".

$75,000 had been spent on the project after five years of development by June 1986. The CBC withdrew its support, but the Ontario Film Development Corporation and the CFDC replaced them. Lucas wrote another draft, with the aid of Paul Shapiro as story editor, under the title Diplomatic Immunity. The film had a project budget of $2.5 million and production financing ended in March 1990. The project received financing from the OFDC, NFB, CBC, Channel 4, and Astral. The final budget had $271,000 from the NFB.

Bill Niven introduced Gunnarsson to Michael Donovan, the executive producer of CODCO, in 1988. Donovan read the film's script and agreed to become its executive producer for a fee of $125,000. Donovan suffered from food poisoning in Mexico City and fought off three robbers in a beach hut outside of Acapulco while on a research trip with Gunnarsson.

In fall 1989, Lucas completed another draft and submitted it to Telefilm. They requested $900,000, but Telefilm offered $1 million if another draft was written. Another draft was written during Christmas 1989 and was accepted by Telefilm. Bill House, the head of Telefilm in Ontario, was critical of the proposed budget of $2.7 million citing the earthquake and military scenes as too demanding for it.

The final budget received contributions of $1 million from Telefilm, $450,000 from OFDC, $350,000 from the CBC, $300,000 from Channel 4, $271,350 from the NFB, $100,000 from Astral, and $210,704 through deferrals.

=== Filming ===
Martha Burns and Kate Nelligan were considered for the lead role, but Wendel Meldrum was selected in December 1989, after fifty other actresses were auditioned. The film was rewritten twice within five months of Meldrum being hired.

Michael McDonald was hired as line producer after Motion Picture Guarantors requested that a high-ranking line producer to oversee the project's expenditures. Gunnarsson and McDonald went to Mexico to start pre-production in May 1990. They negotiated with the actors and technicians' unions and Gunnarsson stated that they had "the most-iron clad contracts in the universe" as their definitions of daytime and nighttime hours meant they would require overtime pay once production started. The increased spending in Mexico threatened the film's state financing, as a certain percentage had to be spent in Canada. Donovan told Gunnarsson to cut the budget as they would not be able to raise more money. The shooting schedule was shortened from six weeks to five weeks.

In May 1990, Donovan planned on taking $850,000 from Rogers Telefund, rather than the Royal Bank of Canada, to use for interim financing as Rogers Telefund had a lower interest rate and no fees. However, a shortage at Rogers Telefund meant that it could only offer $425,000 and Donovan instead received the loan from the Royal Bank.

The film was shot north of Mexico City in conjunction with Estudios América. Footage was shot in Mexico, but was transported to Canada for development before returning on video. Rosalie Salazar, the Mexican production manager, believed that one of her enemies placed a spell on the film, She stated that only an anti-hex could cure the film and McDonald hired a witch.

The film was dedicated to Beto Arellanos, a Mexican gaffer who was killed in a car accident during production.

=== Editing ===
The first assembly cut of the film was made over the course of eight weeks in the summer of 1990 by Gunnarsson and Jeff Warren. Lucas was pleased with the assembly cut, but criticized the rough cut as "one of the most painful days of my life". Lucas saw the second rough cut as an improvement, but that the third cut was worse and "the picture didn't work".

Gunnarsson stated that test screenings reported that the audience "said it was great once it started", but that they could not follow the story and hated the lead character. He considered adding in a framing device, which was present in earlier drafts. Lucas stated that the film would either have to be narrated by Meldrum or have a frame device state that the lead character was not meant to be liked. They chose to have a character played by Michael Hogan portray the lead character as not a "bleeding heart" or "liberal".

A fourth rough cut with a voice over was shown in October while the opening framing device was shot on 11 November in Toronto. The film was completed by December. Wayne Case, the senior vice president of distribution of Astral's Toronto division, was disappointed with Canadian films due to their good performances at festivals, but poor box office earnings. He was one of the first people to see the final cut of the film and was enthusiastic and "for a change actually enjoyed a Canadian movie".

== Release ==
Channel 4 paid around $200,000 for the film's television distribution rights in the United Kingdom, along with $100,000 of equity in the film, and the CBC paid $350,000 for the rights in Canada. Astral Films paid $450,000 for the Canadian distribution rights, but this voided the contract with the CBC. Astral Films had 75% of the distribution acquisition cost reimbursed by Telefilm Canada. The net cost of acquiring the rights was $25,000 for the company and they earned $43,000 from video cassette sales.

The film was submitted for 1991 Cannes Film Festival pre-selection committee in the hopes of gaining positive news coverage that would aid its box office earnings. Diplomatic Immunity, The Pianist, and The Adjuster were chosen for Canada's entry to Cannes, but Diplomatic Immunity was eliminated by the finalist panel. By the time of its elimination it was too late for the film to be submitted for a lesser category. Serge Losique selected the film to be one of two Canadian films shown at the Montreal World Film Festival.

Metropolis wanted Astral to premiere the film nationally in major cities, but Astral declined due to the financial risk. The film was released in four theatres, one English and three French, on 4 October 1991. The theatrical release occurred two months after its showing at the Montreal World Film Festival as Astral was searching for a distributor for the United States.

The film earned $4,794 in its opening weekend and $7,486 in its opening week. In its second week it was reduced to theatres in French-speaking Longueuil and Laval. The film was also shown in Toronto and Vancouver. It was shown on the CBC in November 1992, and was invited to 15 film festivals by March 1993.

Robert Lantos and Victor Loewy, the heads of Alliance Films, watched the film in the summer of 1991. Lantos stated that "compared to the shit that's been produced in this country in the last couple of years, this is almost a masterpiece". Lantos liked the film and wanted to acquire its distribution rights, but Gunnarsson first offered it to Miramax and Films Transit, but Films Transit refused to conduct a theatrical release for the United States. Alliance acquired the rights, but did not theatrically show the film.

== Reception ==
The film garnered four Genie Award nominations at the 12th Genie Awards in 1991: two for Best Supporting Actor (Hogan and Riley), one for Best Supporting Actress (Medina), and one for Best Original Score (Jonathan Goldsmith).

Ofelia Medina's performance in the film was praised by critics while Meldrum was criticized, including by Astral.

== Works cited ==
- Posner, Michael (1993). Canadian Dreams: The Making and Marketing of Independent Films. Canadian Independent Film Caucus. ISBN 1550541145.
