= War Story (TV series) =

Canadian television documentary series

- Directed by: Barry Stevens; Nick Hector
- Music by: David Wall
- Country of origin: Canada
- Original language: English

Production
- Producers: David York; Barry Stevens; Bryn Hughes
- Cinematography: Michael Boland; Michael Grippo
- Editors: Nick Hector; David Kazala

Original release
- Network: History
- Release: 8 November 2012 – 11 November 2016

War Story is a Canadian television documentary series, which has aired on History since 2012. Airing between six and thirteen episodes per season, the series examines stories of Canada's military participation in war.

The first three seasons were general examinations of war, with individual episodes focusing on stories from World War II, the Korean War and the Vietnam War, while the fourth season, titled War Story: Afghanistan, focused exclusively on the more recent War in Afghanistan.

At the 2nd Canadian Screen Awards in 2014, director Barry Stevens won the award for Best Direction in a Documentary Series for the first-season episode "Ortona: The War Inside". At the 5th Canadian Screen Awards in 2017, War Story: Afghanistan won the award for History Documentary Program or Series, and Stevens won the award for Best Direction in a Documentary Series for the episode "The Long Way Home". Andrew Theobald was also nominated for the Barbara Sears Award for Editorial Research for the episode "The Long Way Home".

== Episodes ==
=== Season 1 ===
No.	Title	Directed by	Original airdate
1	"Bomber Command - Hitting Back"	Barry Stevens	8 November 2012
In 1940, with Britain and the Commonwealth virtually fighting alone against the Nazi onslaught, Germany began widescale bombing of British cities. The British survived this brutal assault, and, by 1942, Bomber Command, under the direction of Air Marshal Sir Arthur Harris, commenced strategic bombing of German cities. For the British and Canadian aircrews flying the bombers, these may have been revenge attacks, but they were also a grim task to which they were entirely committed in the service of winning the war. The campaign took a tremendous toll, a cost also borne by the Germans on the ground. Hitting Back takes the viewer through a strategic bombing sortie, as experienced by the Allied personnel on the ground and in the air, German defenders, and survivors of the attacks. Bomber Command aircrew woke every morning and prepared for night operations and the many dangers they promised. Aircrew selected for action controlled their fears as best they could, particularly if the target proved to be the heart of German industry in the Ruhr, sardonically nicknamed "Happy Valley." The German defences, a network of radar stations, 88mm anti-aircraft guns, searchlights, and night fighters, inflicted terrible casualties on the attacking bombers and their crews, almost half of whom who were killed or wounded on operations. By 1944-45, Bomber Command routinely dispatched 1,000 or more bombers against German targets every night that weather conditions allowed. The devastating consequences of attacks - like No. 5 Bomber Group's raid against Darmstadt on the night of 11–12 September 1944 - for both for the young men in the skies and the people on the ground, are vividly reflected upon in this film.
2	"Bomber Command - Getting Home"	Barry Stevens	8 November 2012
Getting home was never easy for bomber crews: Flying with Bomber Command was the most dangerous service in the Allied forces during the Second World War. Of the 125,000 men who served in bomber aircrew, 55,000 were killed, including nearly 10,000 Canadians. Indeed, a majority of bomber aircrew did not survive the 30 sorties needed to complete an operational tour. Getting Home continues the incredible story of Bomber Command begun in Hitting Back. Bomber Command operated mainly at night, striking German cities and industrial infrastructure. The British and Canadian aircrew, including pilots, bomb aimers, and gunners - overwhelmingly young men in their late teens and early twenties - were well aware that their odds of survival were slim. German defenders, including even younger men manning anti-aircraft guns, and determined night fighter pilots, ensured that those odds did not improve. Bomber Command personnel pressed on regardless, for even when a target was attacked, as recalled in Hitting Back, the trip home to England remained fraught with danger. In stricken aircraft, often sheltering comrades who had been mortally wounded, desperate bomber crews scanned the skies for German fighters. Even if the German defences could be evaded, emergency landings involved leaking fuel, unexploded bombs, or the absence of landing gear. Tens of thousands of airmen also baled out of doomed bombers, becoming prisoners of war, or being lynched on landing by furious German civilians. In this film, Bomber Command personnel and German veterans look back on the losses they suffered, providing an intimate, personal, examination of one of the Second World War's most protracted and deadly campaigns.
3	"Kap'Yong"	Barry Stevens	9 November 2012
On 22 April 1951, the invading Chinese Army threatened Seoul, capital of South Korea. The Chinese forces had pushed back the United Nations defenders, but they still had to confront a heavily outnumbered Canadian infantry battalion of determined volunteers. Kap'yong is simultaneously one of the finest small unit actions in Canadian history and a forgotten battle in a war that has never received due attention in Canada. In Kap'yong: The Forgotten Battle, Canadian and Chinese veterans reflect on those fateful events of over 60 years ago. The Canadian defenders at Kap'yong comprised the 700 men of 2nd Battalion, Princess Patricia's Canadian Light Infantry (2 PPCLI), raised specifically for service in Korea. The volunteers included young men eager for adventure, as well as many Second World War veterans. One of the latter, Colonel Jim Stone, a soldier renowned for his toughness, commanded the battalion. The Canadians were united in their ignorance of Korea and their shock at the poverty and chaos that greeted them when the arrived in the war-ravaged peninsula in December 1950. Although the American-led United Nations forces, reeling from North Korean/Chinese offensives, ordered the Canadians to move immediately to the front line, Colonel Stone refused, insisting that his troops needed more training. Those troops validated his stand through their excellent performance at Kap'yong. On 22 April 1951, the Chinese People's Volunteer Army's Spring Offensive had already made impressive gains. South Korean forces were in panicked retreat, the Chinese had shattered the British forces in their path, and the Communist attackers had forced a tough Australian battalion off of Hill 504. Only 2 PPCLI barred their route to Seoul through the Kap'yong Valley. Atop Hill 677, the feature's metric height, the Canadians awaited the advance of the Chinese, fully aware that retreat was not an option. Moving silently through the night, the attackers, who outnumbered the Canadians almost ten-to-one, swarmed the Canadian positions. In close quarters fighting that included bayonet actions, the Patricias' "A," "B," and "C" Company, with the aid of the Support Company, repulsed the Chinese. "D" Company bore the brunt of the assault, however, and also held the key to the outcome. Surrounded, the lead platoon, under command of Lieutenant Mike Levy, took the extraordinary move of calling in artillery on their position. The accurate fire of the New Zealand gunners finally broke the Chinese attack and inflicted hundreds of casualties on the Communist forces. The Patricias lost a dozen men of their own, but they held: Seoul remained free. While 2 PPCLI became the first Canadian unit to be awarded the prestigious United States Presidential Unit Citation, there would be no domestic recognition for the victors when they returned home. The Forgotten Battle sheds much needed light on the vital action at Kap'yong.
4	"Bomb Girls Remembered"	Barry Stevens	9 November 2012
During the Second World War, 250,000 Canadian women helped to build the arsenal of democracy. There was a two-tiered motivation for these workers from across Canada, mainly young women outside of the home for the first time, to seek employment in the arms industry. The government's official line asserted that women in industry released men for front line military service, but deeper and more personal motivations, namely a desire to help win the war and bring those same men home as soon as possible, prevailed. These young women met the challenges of factory work and helped to win the Second World War, and by doing so, paved the way for future generations.
5	"Sicily - The First Campaign"	Barry Stevens	10 November 2012
The Sicily Campaign began with the largest seaborne invasion in history on 9–10 July 1943. The Allied forces of Britain, Canada, and the United States, in the first direct invasion of Axis territory, sought to knock Italy out of the war and attack Germany from the south. Prior to Sicily, the Second World War Canadian Army had only seen combat at Hong Kong and Dieppe, both unmitigated disasters. The Canadian units that took part in the campaign - the 1st Canadian Infantry Division and the 1st Canadian Armoured Brigade, a combined 25,000 men containing formations from all across the country - had been in Britain since December 1939, and they were eager to test themselves in combat. After nearly four years of waiting, how would they respond to the real thing? In this film, the men who were there tell us in their own words. The Allies did not enjoy complete air and naval superiority, endangering the landings. The Canadians came ashore at Pachino, on the southeastern most tip of the island. The Italian defenders generally offered token resistance, if any, but the German formations, notably the 15th Panzer Grenadier Division and the Hermann Goering Panzer Division, fought ferociously to delay the Allies and inflict as many casualties as possible. The sweltering Sicilian summer, coupled with the island's mountainous terrain and poor infrastructure - the temperature routinely exceeded 40 degrees and movement was almost entirely on foot or by mule - heavily influenced the fighting: No other Canadian soldiers fought in conditions of this kind during the Second World War. Acting as the left flank of the British 8th Army, the Canadians distinguished themselves at Modica, Leonforte, and Agira. The most celebrated action of the campaign occurred on 20–21 July, when The Hastings and Prince Edward Regiment boldly scaled Monte Assoro under cover of darkness, surprised the German defenders, seized the summit, and held it against 11 concerted German counterattacks. It took the Allies 38 days to overcome the fierce German opposition and secure the island. In the meantime, Benito Mussolini was deposed and the new Italian government proposed peace talks with the Allies. The Canadians had marched over 200 kilometres and played a pivotal role in the victory, but at the cost of 2,310 casualties, including 562 dead. However, the Germans re-grouped and prepared to make their next stand across the Strait of Messina. The battles for Ortona and Rome would follow.
6	"Ortona - The War Inside"	Barry Stevens	10 November 2012
7	"The Road to Rome"	Barry Stevens	10 November 2012
From Ortona, the Canadians moved across the Italian peninsula to the Liri Valley, the mountainous area to the south of the Italian capital of Rome. With the Hitler Line shattered by Canadian infantry, the tankers of the 5th Canadian Armoured Division surprised the Germans with an audacious crossing of the Melfa River, but their American allies were given the prize of liberating the eternal city. The Road to Rome examines the incredible experiences of Canadian veterans, the victories and horrors of armoured combat, and the pivotal value, far too often neglected, of the overall Italian Campaign. The Americans and British had sought to capture Rome in January 1944, surprising the Germans with an amphibious landing at Anzio. The Germans quickly countered that attack, pinning down the Anzio troops. By May 1944, hundreds of thousands of Allied attackers, German defenders, and Italian civilians had been killed in the vicious series of battles for Monte Cassino. On 18 May, the Poles finally captured the summit of that ruined monastery. On 23–24 May, the Canadian Corps smashed through the Hitler Line, just north of Monte Cassino, opening up Highway 6, the most direct route to Rome, just 100 kilometres away. Before the Germans could consolidate yet another defensive line, the 5th Canadian Armoured Division and the tanks of Lord Strathcona's Horse, the 8th New Brunswick Hussars, and the British Columbia Dragoons spearheaded the Allied advance. A reconnaissance troop from Lord Strathcona's Horse, under command of Lieutenant Ed Perkins, audaciously established a bridgehead over the Melfa River, later built up with Sherman tanks and infantry from "A" Company, The Westminster Regiment, through surprise and desperate fighting. The firm leadership and skill of Lieutenant Perkins and Major John Mahony of the Westminsters, decorated with the Victoria Cross for his actions, held off repeated German counterattacks, in spite of heavy losses. Beyond the Melfa, terrain remained a problem, as did German resistance from Panther and Tiger tanks, but the Canadians - including many tank crews in combat for the first time - relentlessly pushed forward in fighting in which no quarter was granted. Suddenly, on 31 May, Allied high command ordered the Canadian armour to halt: The Americans paraded into Rome unopposed on 4 June, enraging the Canadians, who believed the Americans took undue credit for their accomplishments. The German Tenth Army escaped to fight again along the Gothic Line and, on 6 June, the Allies launched the D-Day landings in Normandy, rendering the Italian Campaign a sideshow. The term "D-Day Dodgers" soon entered the vernacular as an expression describing those serving in Italy after the Normandy invasion. Self-applied by Italian Campaign veterans, the sardonic term encapsulated the lack of attention paid to their contributions, including eleven months of combat from Sicily to the road to Rome before 6 June 1944.
8	"Out of the Clouds - Paratroopers in Normandy"	Barry Stevens	11 November 2012
In Normandy, the 1st Canadian Parachute Battalion proved itself to be in the vanguard of the best-trained and toughest units in the Allied forces. Established in 1942 - predominantly recruited from the cream of young and adventurous volunteers who boasted long experience in manual labour and contact sports - on the early morning of D-Day, 6 June 1944, the paratroopers, the only Canadian unit in the 6th British Airborne Division, were dropped behind enemy lines in Nazi-occupied France, equipped only with what they could carry. They fought surrounded by the enemy, with no guarantee that reinforcements would ever reach them. In spite of heavy casualties, they met all of their objectives and successfully held the eastern flank of the invasion, ensuring the Germans did not break through to counter-attack the Allied landing beaches. The paratroops were different, as their maroon berets, jump boots, and unique insignia testified. Out of the Clouds - the battalion's motto - follows a group of men from across Canada who innocently signed up for the most gruelling training program in the world. That innovative program emphasized independence, physical endurance, and realistic preparation for jumping into combat - with, unlike their brothers in the American paratroopers, no reserve parachute. The battalion's baptism of fire came the night before D-Day when American, British, and Canadian paratroopers jumped into Normandy, the first troops into occupied France. The Canadians' job: Protect the eastern flank of the coming amphibious landings and prevent the Germans from getting to the beaches. Things did not go as planned. In the darkness, confusion, and German anti-aircraft fire, the transport pilots widely scattered the paras beyond their intended drop zone outside the small Norman village of Varaville. Dozens of men drowned when they landed in flooded fields and it took the survivors hours to find their comrades. In spite of these difficulties, groups of paras banded together and carried out their objectives, destroying bridges over the Dives River at Varaville and Robehomme. After doing so, the paras moved to the vital Le Mesnil crossroads, where they dug in and stubbornly held the position under constant German fire. On 12 June, six days after D-Day, the paras, along with British troops who had reached their positions from Sword Beach, repulsed the most serious German counterstroke with the aid of naval artillery. In spite of their heavy losses - from 6 June through to September 1944, the battalion lost nearly two-thirds of its strength - their skill and limitless pride saw the paras through: They would soon be in action again.
9	"Across the Rhine - Paratroopers in Germany"	Barry Stevens	11 November 2012
In mid-September 1944, the remnants of the battered 1st Canadian Parachute Battalion returned to England from Normandy. After their success on the continent, experiences detailed in Out of the Clouds: Paras in Normandy, the Canadian veterans felt they deserved a chance to rest and reorganize. However, their new commanding officer, Lieutenant-Colonel Jeff Nicklin, a former star with the Western Canada Rugby Football Union's Winnipeg Blue Bombers, was a hard-driving disciplinarian. Worn down by a training regimen they regarded as punishing and unfair, the exhausted soldiers demonstrated their collective unhappiness with a three-day hunger strike. Their well-respected British Brigadier, James Hill, promptly straightened out the situation. Following an eventful interlude in Belgium and The Netherlands from 2 January to 23 February 1945 - making the battalion the only Canadian unit to fight in the Battle of the Bulge - the paras prepared for the final push into Germany itself. By March 1945, the Nazis were reeling from combined Soviet and Western Allied offensives, but on the western front the Rhine River loomed as a daunting natural obstacle. On the morning of 24 March, the Allies launched the largest airborne operation in history, Varsity, with the Canadians dropping in the vicinity of Hamminkeln, Germany. The paras welcomed a daylight attack, even though this made them easy targets for Germans on the ground. Indeed, although they quickly met their objectives and took hundreds of German prisoners, Lieutenant-Colonel Nicklin was killed in action. The Canadians were then handpicked for an extraordinary operation - in the final days of the war, the Soviet Red Army's advance threatened to push all the way to Denmark, in spite of a prior agreement to the contrary. The paras raced to the Baltic Sea atop British tanks to stop their ostensible ally from seizing the port of Wismar. On the way, their route was clogged with small cells of Nazi fanatics who resisted to the end, armed German soldiers eager to surrender en masse, civilians desperate to escape the vengeful Soviets, and the emaciated survivors of Bergen-Belsen Concentration Camp. On 2 May 1945, the Canadians reached Wismar, only two hours ahead of the Soviets, and promptly set up defensive positions. The initial contact proved extremely tense; any hot-headed move by either side could have started the Third World War. Thanks to a surfeit of resolve, careful diplomacy, Russian-speaking Canadian soldiers - and drinking - the paras settled things down. V-E Day, 8 May, brought celebratory swimming in the Baltic. On 21 June, the battalion returned to Canada, the first formed unit back from the fighting. Preparations soon began for the paras to take part in the war against Japan, but when that conflict ended in August, the men truly returned home, although they never forgot the pivotal role they played in Allied victory.
10	"Vengeance: The Jewish Partisans' War"	Barry Stevens	11 November 2012
In 1941, life as the Jews of Eastern Poland knew it was brought to an abrupt and brutal end. Entire populations were wiped out, but nearly 30,000 Jews escaped the ghettos and work camps. Taking to the nearby forests, they joined the growing underground resistance army, actively fighting the Nazis. Vengeance reveals this little known chapter in history through four such partisans who tell their incredible stories of losing everything and fighting back. Norman, Sara, Faye and Eugene grew up close to the Russian border in villages across Poland and Lithuania, where Jews and gentiles lived side by side. Once Germany invaded Russia, however, neighbours turned into enemies, villages into ghettos. After being herded into the ghetto, Norman hid for an entire day in a hole left from an artillery shell. If he was going to die, he says, he wanted to die fighting. He made it to the woods, but never saw his family again. Faye, a photographer, was ordered by the ghetto commissar to develop photographs of mass graves containing the bodies of her entire family. She wanted revenge. There were over 100,000 partisans across 16 countries throughout Europe. Formed into brigades, they lived in shelters built of logs and branches. For food, medical supplies and ammunition, they launched raids on local villages or Nazi headquarters. Fear of discovery was constant and local collaborators were everywhere, but they persevered. In Vengeance, these partisans describe how they sabotaged Nazi missions, blew up railroad tracks, looked after one another and killed, proving that survival is the ultimate revenge.

=== Season 2 ===
No.	Title	Directed by	Original airdate
1	"Behind Enemy Lines"	Barry Stevens	8 November 2013
Members of the Belgian and French Resistance risk everything to help Canadian airmen evade Nazi capture.
2	"Buchenwald Airmen"	Barry Stevens	8 November 2013
Allied airmen are shot down over occupied France, betrayed to the Nazis, and incarcerated in Buchenwald Concentration Camp.
3	"Prisoners of the Sun"	Barry Stevens	9 November 2013
Canadian soldiers become prisoners of the Japanese after the fall of Hong Kong, but they never stop fighting.
4	"Not One Step Back"	Barry Stevens	9 November 2013
Searing personal reflections of Germans and Soviets who fought at Stalingrad, the bloodiest battle in history.
5	"Hell No, We Won't Go"	Barry Stevens	10 November 2013
American draft resisters who came to Canada during the Vietnam War reflect on their actions, and the consequences.
6	"Next Stop Vietnam"	Barry Stevens	10 November 2013
Canadian combat veterans of the Vietnam War affirm their dramatic and virtually unknown experiences.
7	"Peril on the Sea"	Barry Stevens	11 November 2013
Canadian sailors overcome inexperience, the elements, and German submarines to win the Battle of the Atlantic and keep the British Isles alive.
8	"The Last Ship: The Sinking of the Esquimalt"	Barry Stevens	11 November 2013
HMCS Esquimalt is torpedoed off Halifax by a German submarine, leaving the survivors to the frigid waters of the North Atlantic.

=== Season 3 ===
No.	Title	Directed by	Original airdate
1	"Dieppe Survived"	Barry Stevens	8 November 2014
Canadian soldiers tell amazing stories of survival and POW ordeals after the disastrous 1942 Dieppe raid.
2	"D-Day + One"	Barry Stevens & Nick Hector	9 November 2014
The untold story of the day after D-Day when Canadian troops got furthest into France and had to defend the Allied invasion from a vicious German counterattack.
3	"Whistle for a Tiffy"	Barry Stevens & Nick Hector	9 November 2014
Canadian Typhoon pilots tell gripping stories of the rocket-firing "Tiffy," the iconic fighter-bomber credited with stopping the Nazis in Normandy.
4	"Falaise: The Corridor of Death"	Barry Stevens & Nick Hector	10 November 2014
Canadian soldiers have the pivotal job of closing the trap on a whole German army in Normandy, but the Falaise Gap proves to be a brutal battlefield.
5	"Where Hell Is: The Leopold and Scheldt"	Barry Stevens & Nick Hector	10 November 2014
Canadian soldiers run into a horrific killing zone in the Scheldt Estuary where the Germans have been ordered to fight to the death.
6	"Liberation"	Barry Stevens & Nick Hector	11 November 2014
In Spring 1945, the long-suffering Dutch people - including Jews in hiding - eagerly await their Canadian liberators - but the Germans don't give up easily.

=== Season 4 ===
No.	Title	Directed by	Original airdate
1	"Going to War"	Barry Stevens & Nick Hector	11 November 2015
2	"Cradle of the Taliban"	Barry Stevens & Nick Hector	11 November 2015
3	"The White School"	Barry Stevens & Nick Hector	11 November 2015
4	"Operation Medusa"	Barry Stevens & Nick Hector	11 November 2015
5	"Hearts and Minds"	Barry Stevens & Nick Hector	11 November 2015
6	"The Long Way Home"	Barry Stevens & Nick Hector	11 November 2015

=== Season 5 ===
No.	Title	Directed by	Original airdate
1	"War Story: The Damage Done"	Barry Stevens & Nick Hector	11 November 2016
