= Emmanuel Kabongo =

Canadian actor, producer (born 1986)

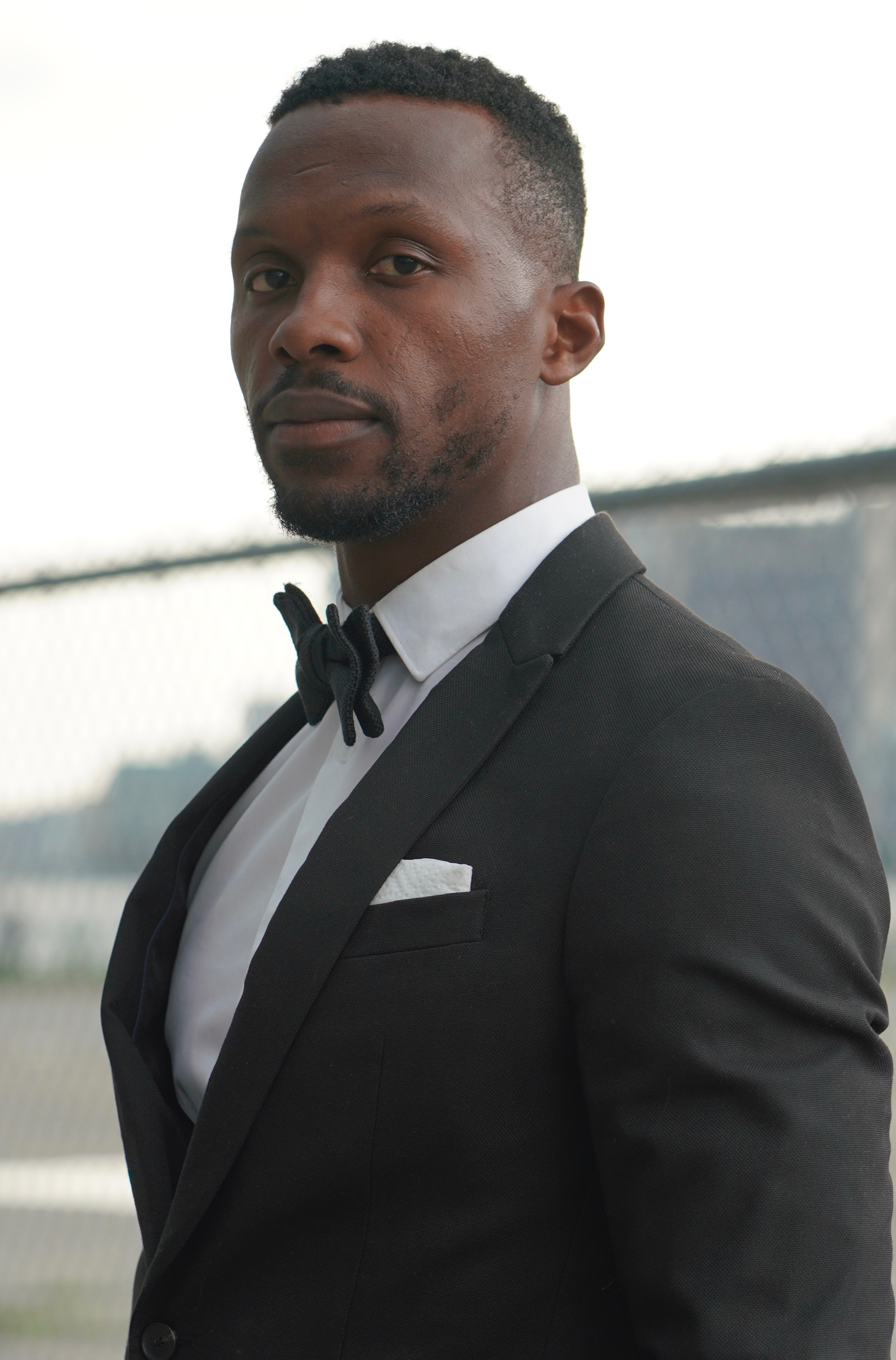
- Kabongo in 2020
- Born: Emmanuel Kabongo; December 25, 1986 (age 39); Lubumbashi, Zaire
- Education: Canadian Film Centre
- Occupations: Actor, producer
- Years active: 2009–present

Emmanuel Kabongo (born December 25, 1986) is a Canadian actor and producer. Born and raised in Zaire, now present day Democratic Republic of the Congo, Kabongo immigrated to Canada and began his acting career as an extra before achieving recognition for his performance as the lead protagonist in the Toronto-based web series Teenagers (2014–2017), for which he earned his first Canadian Screen Award nomination in 2016. Kabongo also co-produced Teenagers.

Kabongo has starred in feature films such as The Animal Project (2013), Pompeii (2014), Antibirth (2016), Brown Girl Begins (2017), Simulant (2023), and Sway (2024), the latter of which he also co-produced.

On television, Kabongo has been featured in series such as Murdoch Mysteries (2013), Frankie Drake Mysteries (2017–2019), Rookie Blue (2013–2014), Quantico (2015), 21 Thunder (2017), Taken (2018), Departure (2019), Ransom (2019), Hudson & Rex (2019), NCIS: Hawaiʻi (2022), and Outer Banks (2023), among others.

Throughout his career as an actor, Kabongo has earned three Canadian Screen Award nominations. (Note: Kabongo was nominated in 2016 for his performance in Teenagers, in 2022 for his performance in the television film Death She Wrote, and in 2023 for his performance in Chateau Laurier.)

== Early life ==
Kabongo was born and raised in Lubumbashi, a city in the Democratic Republic of the Congo (which was then known as Zaire), before relocating with his family to South Africa during the war. He has four brothers, including basketball player Myck Kabongo, and one sister.

In the 1990s, Kabongo immigrated to Toronto with his family. Kabongo's father often worked as an extra, which exposed Kabongo to show business at a young age. In school, Kabongo played competitive basketball; he later turned down a basketball scholarship from the University of New Brunswick to pursue acting. Kabongo also struggled with scoliosis in his youth.

Before he began pursuing acting, Kabongo worked several jobs, including at a daycare, a Foot Locker, at the Canadian National Exhibition, and vacuuming floors and cleaning toilets at a train station.

== Career ==
Kabongo began his acting career in 2009, working as an extra on Canadian television series such as Nikita and Flashpoint. One of Kabongo's early background actor jobs was on the hit 2004 film Mean Girls. Kabongo's first role in a full-length feature film came in 2013 with the release of Ingrid Veninger's independent film The Animal Project. The film premiered at the Toronto International Film Festival and received generally positive reviews. He completed an actor's residency at Norman Jewison's Canadian Film Centre in 2015. In 2014, Kabongo portrayed a gladiator in Paul W. S. Anderson's romantic historical disaster film Pompeii. The film won the Academy of Canadian Cinema and Television's Golden Screen Award for 2014 as the year's top-grossing Canadian film.

Throughout the 2010s and 2020s, Kabongo guest-starred in a variety of television programs, including Call Me Fitz (2012), Murdoch Mysteries (2013), Rookie Blue (2013–2014), Quantico (2015), Taken (2018), Departure (2019), Ransom (2019), Hudson & Rex (2019), NCIS: Hawaiʻi (2022), and Outer Banks (2023), among others.

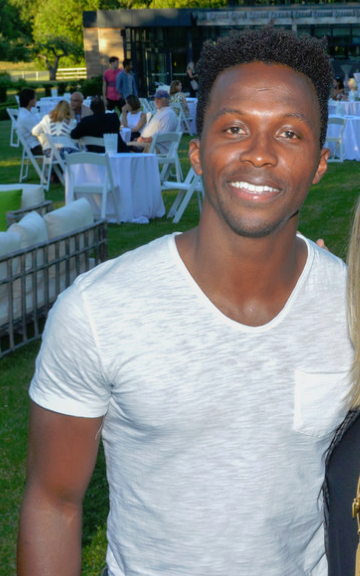
Kabongo in 2016

With filmmaker Houston Bone (then credited as M. H. Murray), Kabongo co-produced the first season of the web series Teenagers. In 2013, Bone approached Kabongo with the scripts and asked him to help produce the series; they subsequently cast the rest of the characters together using only actors from Toronto. Louis Chunovic of Playback published a piece on the series, writing that "the young creators of Teenagers had to have plenty of luck, pluck, talent, and grit to get this far. And that portends a Hollywood ending". Kabongo also starred as the lead male protagonist in the series. Teenagers received positive reviews from critics and was frequently compared to the Degrassi franchise and the UK television series Skins. The series amassed millions of views on YouTube over the course of three seasons. For his performance in the second season of Teenagers, Kabongo earned his first Canadian Screen Award nomination in 2016.

In 2016, Kabongo produced and starred in A Man's Story, a short film for which he received funding from bravoFACT. The short film premiered at the ReelWorld Film Festival. That year, he also played a supporting role in Antibirth, which premiered at the Sundance Film Festival and was released on September 2, 2016, in the U.S., by IFC Midnight.

In September 2016, CBC announced it had commissioned a one-hour drama series that follows the star players of an under-21 soccer academy in Montreal, titled 21 Thunder, with Kabongo slated to star as one of the lead characters, an Ivory Coast mid-fielder named Junior Lolo. The series premiered in Canada on July 31, 2017, to generally positive reviews. Also that year, Kabongo appeared in three episodes of the CBC series Frankie Drake Mysteries as a boxer named Moses, and he starred opposite Mouna Traoré in Brown Girl Begins, a post-apocalyptic science fiction film directed by Sharon Lewis.

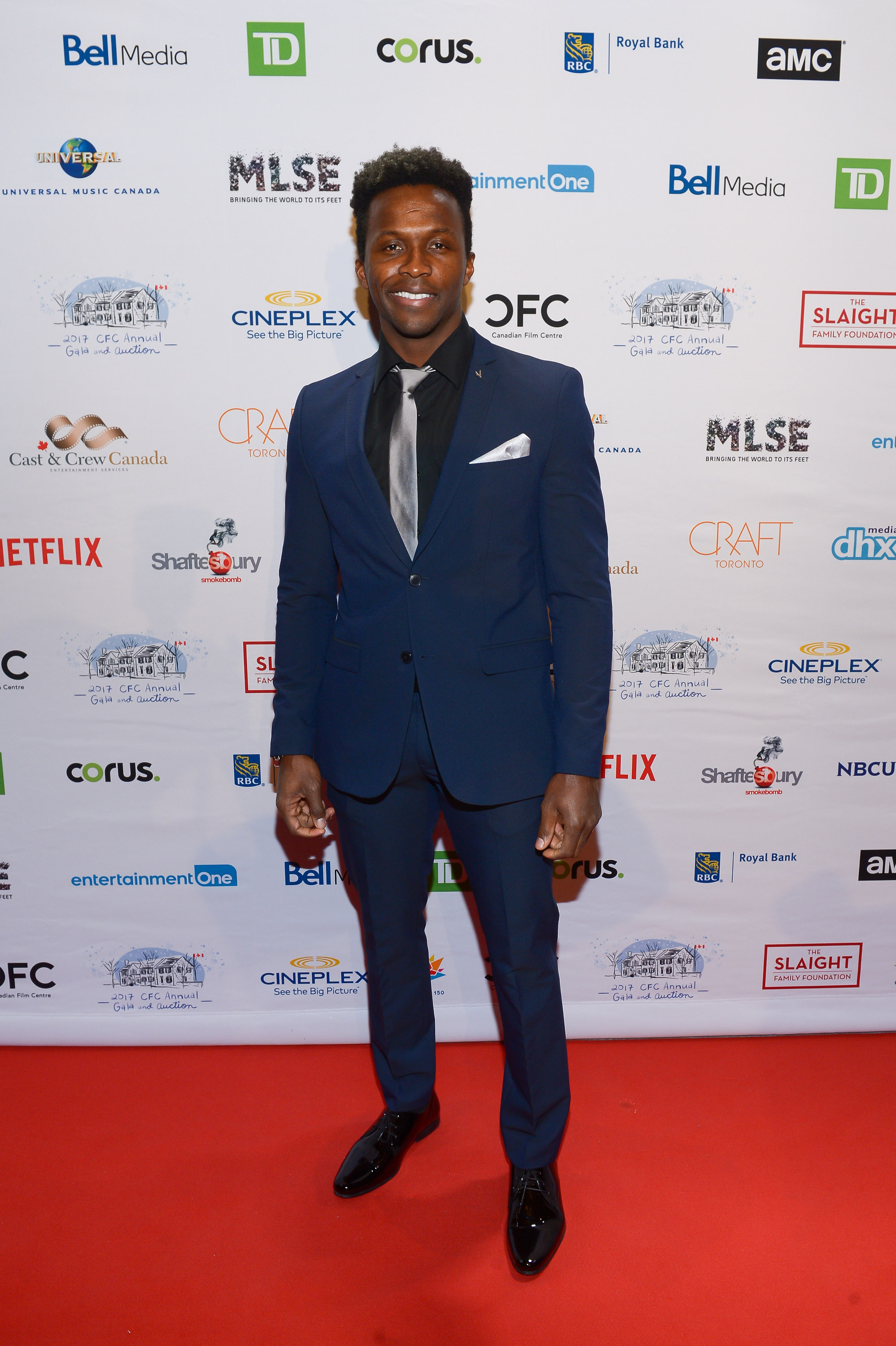
Kabongo at a Canadian Film Centre event in 2017

In 2020, he starred in an episode of the CBS All Access series Star Trek: Discovery as V’Kir. That year, he also played a supporting role in the Canadian political comedy film Québexit, which premiered at the Cinéfest Sudbury International Film Festival in September 2020.

Kabongo received a second Canadian Screen Award nomination in 2022, for his leading performance in the television film Death She Wrote. He received a third nomination in 2023 for this supporting performance in the web series Chateau Laurier. He won several other awards for his performance in Chateau Laurier at web series festivals.

In 2022, he was cast in April Mullen’s sci-fi thriller, Hello Stranger. That film, later retitled Simulant, was released theatrically in Canada by Mongrel Media on April 7, 2023. Kabongo was featured in the film alongside a cast that included Sam Worthington and Simu Liu.

In 2024, Kabongo starred in and produced the low-budget independent drama feature film Sway. Kabongo described the film as a "wild rollercoaster." The film premiered at the 2024 Pan African Film Festival in the U.S., and held its Canadian premiere the following week at the 2024 Toronto Black Film Festival with two sold out screenings. It also screened in the Borsos Competition program at the 2024 Whistler Film Festival.

== Influences ==
Kabongo found early acting inspiration in action films from the 1990s that his mother showed him as a child. In an interview with CBC Arts, Kabongo said that "taking acting serious came from watching how my mom reacted to films of the '90s ... [She] loves Denzel, Van Damme, Sylvester Stallone... My mom watched all those movies growing up, and knowing how that made her feel, I just wanted to do the same thing for her." Kabongo has cited Leonardo DiCaprio, Tom Hardy, Mahershala Ali, Viola Davis, and Daniel Day-Lewis as acting inspirations.

== Personal life ==
Kabongo is a Christians. Kabongo was active during the protests following the police murder of George Floyd in summer 2020. In an interview with Harry Rosen, he said that "it’s important to me as a Black man to stand up for what is right, supporting the cause against police brutality."

== Awards ==
Year	Association	Category	Nominated work	Result
2013	African Entertainment Awards	Best African Actor	Self	Won
2014	Los Angeles Web Series Festival	Outstanding Drama Series	Teenagers	Won
2014	Black Canadian Awards	Best Male Actor	Self	Nominated
2015	Black Canadian Awards	Best Male Actor	Self	Nominated
2016	Reelworld Film Festival	Impact Award	A Man's Story	Won
2016	4th Canadian Screen Awards	Best Performance in a Program or Series Produced for Digital Media	Teenagers	Nominated
2017	International Academy of Web Television	Best Male Performance – Drama	Teenagers	Nominated
2017	AfroGlobal Television Excellence Awards	Rising Star Award	Self	Won
2019	ReelWorld Film Festival	Trailblazer Award	Self	Won
2022	10th Canadian Screen Awards	Lead Actor, Television Film or Miniseries	Death She Wrote	Nominated
2023	11th Canadian Screen Awards	Supporting Performance, Web Program or Series	Chateau Laurier	Nominated

== Filmography ==
=== Film ===
Year	Title	Role	Notes
2009	The Red Pearl	John	Minor role
2011	Night Express	Crazy Billy	Minor role
2013	The Animal Project	Ray	Main role
2014	Pompeii	African Gladiator	Minor role
2016	The Other Half	Officer James	Supporting role
2016	Antibirth	Luke	Supporting role
2016	A Man's Story	Kam Eganda	bravoFACT short film, lead role, also producer
2017	Brown Girl Begins	Tony	Lead role
2018	Extracurricular	Mike Vanden	Supporting role
2019	Run This Town	Abe	Supporting role
2020	Québexit	James Brodie	
2021	Death She Wrote	Rand Tollson	
2023	Simulant	Joshua	
2023	Write Place, Write Time	Daniel Rose	
2024	Sway	Sway	Also producer
2024	Beautiful Wedding	Buzz	
2025	It Comes in Waves	Coach Patterson	

=== Television ===
Year	Title	Role	Notes
2010	Breakout	George Hyatt	1 episode
2010	Forensic Factor	Jack	1 episode
2010	Flashpoint	Kevin	1 episode
2010	Nikita	Safwani's Bodyguard No. 4	1 episode
2011	Christmas Magic	Chef No. 1	Television film
2011	InSecurity	Shinka	1 episode
2012	Cybergeddon	FBI agent No. 1	2 episodes
2012	Call Me Fitz	Joe	1 episode
2013	Murdoch Mysteries	Al	1 episode
2013	Mayday	First Officer Beyene	1 episode
2013	Black Actress	Jessie	1 episode
2014	Defiance	EMC Soldier	1 episode
2014	The Ron James Show	Actor	2 episodes
2013–2014	Rookie Blue	Shay Bishop	2 episodes
2014–2017	Teenagers	T	Main role, web series
2015	Hemlock Grove	Marshall	2 episodes
2015	Quantico	Kamran Tahan	1 episode
2017	21 Thunder	Junior Lolo	Main role
2017–2019	Frankie Drake Mysteries	Moses	5 episodes
2018	Evolve: Year Zero	Blue	Main role, web series
2018	Darken: Before the Dark	Artemis	Web series
2018	Kristal Clear	Benjamin	Web series
2018	Taken	Domingo	1 episode
2019	Street Legal	Roman Mussi	2 episodes
2019	Ransom	Tyler LeFebure	4 episodes
2019	Departure	Orderly	3 episodes
2019	Hudson & Rex	Valentine Anson	2 episodes
2019	V-Wars	Jack Fields	2 episodes
2020	Star Trek: Discovery	V’Kir	1 episode
2021	Death She Wrote	Rand Tolson	Television film
2021	True Story	Man	2 episodes
2022	The Kings of Napa	Everett James	1 episode
2022	NCIS: Hawaiʻi	Pirate 2	1 episode
2022	Chateau Laurier	Gabriel Sabot	Web series
2023	Outer Banks	Raj	3 episodes
2025-	Murdoch Mysteries	Ephraim Currant	Recurring role
