= 88 (film) =

- Directed by: April Mullen
- Screenplay by: Tim Doiron
- Story by: April Mullen; Tim Doiron
- Produced by: April Mullen; Tim Doiron
- Starring: Katharine Isabelle; Christopher Lloyd; Kyle Schmid; Tim Doiron; April Mullen; Jesse McCartney; Michael Ironside
- Cinematography: Brooks Reynolds
- Edited by: Karl T. Hirsch
- Music by: Benoit Grey
- Production company: Wango Films
- Distributed by: Millennium Entertainment
- Release date: 6 January 2015 (US)
- Running time: 88 minutes
- Country: Canada
- Language: English

88 is a 2015 Canadian thriller film directed by April Mullen and written by Tim Doiron. It stars Katharine Isabelle as a woman whose plans for revenge become derailed when she suffers a fugue state and must piece together her memories. It was released in the United States on 6 January 2015 and 8 May 2015 in Canada.

== Plot ==
Confused and not sure where she is, Gwen comes out of a daze in a diner. She is surprised to find a pistol in her bag, and she accidentally shoots a waitress when the police confront her. Fleeing the diner, she returns to a hotel room that matches a key in her possession, though she can not remember any details of it. In her room, she finds a dead body, later revealed to be Winks, her best friend. A man shows up at the room and threatens to kill her, only to himself be killed by a man named Ty, who insists that they made plans to kill an underworld boss named Cyrus at the diner. Gwen, who does not remember Ty or their plans, denies that she would ever kill anyone, but she agrees to leave with him.

Flashbacks reveal that Gwen blames Cyrus for the death of her boyfriend, Aster. After Gwen sees Cyrus with a dead woman, later revealed to be Ty's sister, Cyrus orders both Gwen and Aster killed. In the present, Gwen and Ty go to Lemmy, an illegal arms dealer, to procure new weapons. Before they can do so, Sheriff Knowles tracks them down, and Lemmy initiates a firefight. Lemmy is killed, and Ty is wounded as he escapes. Gwen, too frightened to take part, is arrested. Knowles attempts to piece together what is happening, and Gwen says that she has been framed by Cyrus. More interested in Cyrus than her, Knowles offers to make a deal with her if she can deliver Cyrus. At the same time, Ty assaults the police station and kills several police officers. As Gwen flees the station with Ty, she objects to any further killing, but Ty is killed in a crossfire.

Gwen experiences further flashbacks, which reveal that she was responsible for several deaths while in a fugue state, including Winks' murder. Winks gave Ty and Gwen information on Cyrus' location, but Gwen became suspicious when Winks expressed concern for her welfare. Confused by these memories and still not understanding her own motives, Gwen returns to her quest to kill Cyrus. After she fails to talk her way out of the situation, she shoots and kills a police officer when he stops her for speeding. Confronting Cyrus, she blames him for all the deaths, but Cyrus denies responsibility. At his prodding, she remembers accidentally shooting Aster herself as she attempts to warn him of Cyrus' order. To give Gwen a chance of escaping prosecution, Cyrus tells her to blame him for the death and commits suicide by shooting himself in his mouth in front of her.

The final scene is a flashback and returns to the diner, where Gwen prepares to ambush Cyrus. As Aster's favorite song plays on the jukebox, Gwen becomes distraught and enters a daze.

== Cast ==
- Katharine Isabelle as Gwen / Flamingo
- Christopher Lloyd as Cyrus
- Kyle Schmid as Aster
- Tim Doiron as Ty
- April Mullen as Lemmy
- Jesse McCartney as Winks
- Michael Ironside as Sheriff Knowles
- Anthony Ulc as Jessop
- Mickey Moon as Izzy
- Michael Orr as Dushane
- Dax Ravina as Charlie
- Haley Shannon as Dakota

== Production ==
In October 2013, The Hollywood Reporter reported that Lloyd joined the production. Lloyd said that he enjoyed working with Mullen and Doiron on their previous picture, Dead Before Dawn and was excited to play a villainous character. The initial idea for the story came from a dream that Mullen had. The idea had been in existence for a long time, but Mullen and Doiron wanted to establish a reputation through focusing on comedies before they ventured into a new genre. The script was first written in sequence, then adjusted to better represent the protagonist's fugue state. Shooting took place in Niagara Falls, Ontario, Canada. They visited what they called "underbelly locations". Mullen considered it important to shoot on location. She used practical effects on set. Shooting took place between October and November 2013.

== Release ==
Millennium Entertainment released the film on home video in the United States on 6 January 2015. A Canadian release was planned for March 2015. The film has its world premiere at the Glasgow Film Festival. Mullen planned a special screening in Niagara Falls, Ontario.

== Reception ==
David Berry of the National Post rated it zero stars and called it a clichéd film that overexplains its plot. Though calling the film a calling card for the filmmakers, Liam Lacey of The Globe and Mail rated it 2.5/4 stars and wrote, "The busy loop-the-loop plot and parade of goofy lowlifes preclude any real emotional investment in the material". Linda Barnard of The Toronto Star rated it 2/4 stars and wrote that the film's deliberate quirkiness makes it annoying, despite showing "visual promise". Mike Unsinger of The Georgia Straight wrote, "As much as the final payoff doesn't seem worth the time invested, at least no one can say 88 doesn't shoot high." Tyler Foster of DVD Talk rated it 2.5/5 stars and wrote, "88 isn't bad; it's more overly ambitious, trying to do so much it ends up overwhelmed by technique rather than story and characters." Gordon Sullivan of DVD Verdict wrote, "Fans of Katherine Isabelle and Christopher Lloyd might enjoy seeing some of the insane antics their characters get up to, but most viewers will want to give this revenge thriller a pass."
