= Monsoon (2014 film) =

- Film poster
- Directed by: Sturla Gunnarsson
- Produced by: Ina Fichman
- Cinematography: Van Royko
- Edited by: Nick Hector
- Music by: Andrew T. MacKay
- Production companies: Intuitive Pictures; Point du Jour; Monsoon Ontario
- Distributed by: KinoSmith; Point du Jour International
- Release date: 7 September 2014 (TIFF)
- Running time: 108 minutes
- Countries: Canada; France
- Language: English/Hindi/Assamese/Malayalam/Marathi

Monsoon is a 2014 Canadian documentary film by Sturla Gunnarsson about the monsoon weather system in India.

The film was shot in India in the extra-high-definition 4K format with Red Epic cameras.

The film was included in the list of Canada's Top Ten feature films of 2014, selected by a panel of filmmakers and industry professionals organized by TIFF. Subsequently the film finished first in the audience balloting, of the features in "Canada's Top Ten".

The film had a theatrical run in 2015; meanwhile Gunnarsson was quoted as being in discussions with an American distributor, following Monsoon's United States premiere at the 2015 Palm Springs International Film Festival.
