= Sway (2024 film) =

2024 film by Charlie Hamilton and Zachary Ramelan

- Theatrical release poster
- Directed by: Charlie Hamilton; Zachary Ramelan
- Screenplay by: Charlie Hamilton
- Produced by: Emmanuel Kabongo; Daniel Govia; Chris Morsby; James E.D. Stewart
- Starring: Emmanuel Kabongo; Mishael Morgan; Lovell Adams-Gray
- Cinematography: Chris Morsby
- Edited by: Sydney Cowper
- Music by: Terry Benn; Michelle Osis
- Production companies: UnSeen Piktures; Make the Films; Magic Button Films
- Release dates: February 8, 2024 (PAFF); February 6, 2026 (Canada)
- Running time: 99 minutes
- Country: Canada
- Language: English

Sway is a 2024 Canadian thriller film directed by Charlie Hamilton and Zachary Ramelan and written by Hamilton. The film stars Emmanuel Kabongo as James "Sway" Drayton, a Black community leader whose life begins to unravel after he is blackmailed by a woman after a one-night stand, and his brother is simultaneously abducted by a mysterious gang who are threatening his family.

== Cast ==
The cast is led by Emmanuel Kabongo who stars as James "Sway", and also includes Mishael Morgan, Lovell Adams-Gray, Karl Campbell, Brittany Raymond, Paul Amos, Blake Johnston, Tony Ofori, Prosha Hussein, Ashton Ayres, Carlisle J. Williams, Conni Miu, Husnain Sher and Chad Andrews.

== Production ==
The film marked Kabongo's feature film debut as a producer. It was shot in 2023, in the Regent Park neighbourhood of Toronto, Ontario.

== Distribution ==
The film premiered on February 8, 2024 at the Pan African Film Festival in Los Angeles, and premiered in Canada on February 17 at the Toronto Black Film Festival with two sold out screenings. It also screened in the Borsos Competition program on December 7 at the Whistler Film Festival.
