= Wiebo's War =

- Directed by: David York
- Produced by: David York; Bryn Hughes; Nick Hector; Bonnie Thompson
- Cinematography: Kirk Tougas
- Edited by: Nick Hector
- Music by: Jonathan Goldsmith
- Release date: October 14, 2011
- Running time: 93 minutes
- Country: Canada
- Language: English

Wiebo's War is a 2011 Canadian documentary about eco-warrior Wiebo Ludwig, directed by David York.

== History ==
Ludwig was first approached by York in 2008. Filming began in late 2008 and continued into 2010, with York living as a guest in the isolated Ludwig family compound in the community of Trickle Creek, approximately 450 kilometres northwest of Edmonton, Alberta. The film documents a stillbirth and a string of miscarriages among Ludwig family members, as well as livestock deaths, which Ludwigs attribute to sour gas from nearby gas wells. In one scene, Ludwig home video shows Wiebo holding the stillborn infant, while in another, a family member ignites water from the kitchen tap. During filming in early 2010, Ludwig was arrested as a suspect in bombings of sour-gas installations in nearby British Columbia. The film also explores Ludwig's religious views, with excerpts from a four-hour conversation between the atheist film director and Wiebo and his sons, who tell York that he is living in a "terrible darkness."

== Release ==
Wiebo's War had its world premiere at the Thessaloniki Documentary Festival and its North American premiere at the 2011 Hot Docs Canadian International Documentary Festival. The film opened theatrically in Canada on October 14, 2011, in Ottawa, Ontario.

== Credits ==
Wiebo's War is produced by David York, Bryn Hughes and Nick Hector for 52 Media and Bonnie Thompson for the National Film Board of Canada (NFB). The executive producers are David Christensen (NFB) and David York (52 Media).
