= Force of Nature: The David Suzuki Movie =

- Film poster
- Directed by: Sturla Gunnarsson
- Produced by: Sturla Gunnarsson; Yves J. Ma
- Starring: David Suzuki
- Cinematography: Tony Westman
- Edited by: Nick Hector
- Production companies: Legacy Lecture Productions; National Film Board of Canada
- Release date: September 11, 2010 (TIFF)
- Running time: 112 minutes
- Country: Canada
- Language: English

Force of Nature: The David Suzuki Movie is a 2010 Canadian documentary film, directed by Sturla Gunnarsson. The film profiles Canadian science broadcaster and environmental activist David Suzuki.

The film premiered at the 2010 Toronto International Film Festival, where it won the People's Choice Award for Documentaries. At the Cinéfest Sudbury International Film Festival, it won the award for Best Documentary.

== Reception ==
On the review aggregator website Rotten Tomatoes, 84% of 19 critics' reviews are positive, with an average rating of 7.1/10.
