= The Man Who Saved Christmas =

2002 American television movie

- DVD cover
- Written by: Joseph Maurer
- Directed by: Sturla Gunnarsson
- Starring: Jason Alexander; Kelly Rowan; Ari Cohen; C. David Johnson; Jayne Eastwood; Daniel Kash; Jake Brockman; Kenneth Welsh; Edward Asner
- Theme music composer: Jonathan Goldsmith

Production
- Producer: Randi Richmond
- Cinematography: Paul Sarossy
- Running time: 100 minutes

Original release
- Network: CBS
- Release: December 15, 2002

The Man Who Saved Christmas is a film based on the true story about the efforts of toymaker Alfred Carlton Gilbert (portrayed by Jason Alexander) of the A. C. Gilbert Company to continue making toys during World War I. First broadcast on CBS television in 2002, it was released on DVD and Blu-ray in 2008.

== Plot ==
During the First World War, A. C. Gilbert, a successful toymaker, is requested by the government to re-tool his factory to help produce goods for the war effort. After speaking with his father and his son, Gilbert initially agrees to this, but comes to regret his decision.

Things get the better of Gilbert as he learns that his brother Frank has been declared missing in action in the war. This and other factors cause Gilbert to confront the government over plans to encourage people not to celebrate Christmas in order to save resources for the war effort. Gilbert successfully lobbies the government to allow him (and other toy manufacturers) to resume the production of toys, in particular the building toy known as an Erector Set, for Christmas, thus earning Gilbert the name "The man who saved Christmas."

Ultimately, Gilbert's brother Frank returns from the war in time to celebrate Christmas.

== Cast ==
- Jason Alexander as Alfred Gilbert
- Kelly Rowan as Mary Gilbert
- Ari Cohen as Frank Gilbert
- C. David Johnson as Sam Ryder
- Jayne Eastwood as Mrs. Gilbert
- Daniel Kash as Hiram Harris
- Jake Brockman as Al Gilbert Jr.
- Kenneth Welsh as Newton Baker
- Edward Asner as Charles Gilbert

== Production notes ==
The erector sets used in the film were the later, smaller versions not made until 1924 and not the original, larger pieces made from 1913–1923.

== See also ==
- List of Christmas films

== Location ==
The Gilbert family home was shot in Spadina House, located next to Casa Loma in Toronto with the Distillery District used for external locations.
