= Wander (film) =

- Theatrical release poster
- Directed by: April Mullen
- Written by: Tim Doiron
- Produced by: Tim Doiron; Andre Relis; Chad A. Verdi; April Mullen; Jason Allison; Mary Aloe; Douglas Falconer; James van der Woerd
- Starring: Aaron Eckhart; Katheryn Winnick; Heather Graham; Tommy Lee Jones
- Cinematography: Gavin Smith; Russ De Jong
- Edited by: Luke Higginson
- Music by: Alexandra Mackenzie
- Production companies: Wango Films; VMI Worldwide; Verdi Productions; Don Kee Productions; Roband Productions
- Distributed by: Saban Films
- Release dates: September 11, 2020 (Deauville Film Festival); December 4, 2020 (United States)
- Running time: 94 minutes
- Countries: Canada; United States
- Language: English

Wander is a 2020 American thriller film directed by April Mullen and written by Tim Doiron. It stars Tommy Lee Jones, Aaron Eckhart, Katheryn Winnick, Heather Graham, and Roger Dorman. The story focuses on two conspiracy theorists and their investigation of a murder. Wander was released in the United States on December 4, 2020.

== Plot ==
Arthur Bretnik is a mentally unstable conspiracy theorist and private investigator whose daughter was killed in a vehicle accident. Prior to becoming a conspiracy theorist, he was a detective who investigated the unusual death of an individual whose chest appeared to have something explode out of it, and whose body was later stolen from the morgue. Bretnik and his friend Jimmy Cleats host a podcast that discusses conspiracy theories.

One of the podcast's listeners, Elena Guzman, hires Bretnik to investigate the death of her daughter Zoe in the small town of Wander, New Mexico, which she believes was a covered-up murder. When he arrives, he meets Sheriff Luis Santiago and attempts to investigate the incident, but becomes convinced that he is being followed and that the death may be part of the same "conspiracy cover up" that caused the death of his own daughter years prior. Bretnik's suspicions reach their peak when, after believing he is being followed by two men in an old Jeep Cherokee, he discovers they are in fact transporting a woman's body. When Bretnik goes to investigate, he discovers an underground laboratory where people are trapped and implanted with microchips.

Cleats arrives to investigate with Bretnik, and they discover that Elena and Zoe's identities are fake and that they are actually Sofia and Martina Lopez, missing persons. The two set out to investigate. When Bretnik and Cleats arrive at Sophia's, she attacks Bretnik and claims Cleats is involved before her microchip suddenly explodes, killing her. Cleats claims the "involvement" she mentioned is that he got her to report the death to Bretnik for money, and the two bury Sofia's body in the desert. Bretnik and Cleats then decide to investigate the garage, but, before going, Bretnik places an envelope in a mailbox. Bretnik and Cleats then sneak into the garage to record proof of the laboratory and expose it to the public. Meanwhile, Bretnik's lawyer, Shelly Luscomb, discovers Bretnik's empty trailer and determines he has traveled to Wander.

As Bretnik and Cleats enter the laboratory, the film cuts forward to show Bretnik being involved in a shootout before being apprehended by FBI Agent Nick Cassidy, who arrives with Shelly. Bretnik is questioned, where he explains what happened after he and Cleats arrived at the garage.

When Bretnik and Cleats entered the laboratory, Bretnik learned the microchips are being used to control immigrants, minorities, and the lower class. However, the laboratory was attacked by one of the men from the Jeep, and Cleats was shot. Bretnik was saved by a woman named Elsa Viceroy, apparently from the CIA, and the two met with Sheriff Santiago, who was revealed to also be working against the microchip operation. Elsa and Santiago explained that the victim whose body was stolen from the morgue, as well as Martina, were both embedded with microchips.

Bretnik, Elsa, and Santiago planned to assassinate Victor Canton, the inventor of the microchips, who was on a rare visit to Wander. Sheriff Santiago met with the inventor and the men from the Jeep at the garage, while Elsa and Bretnik moved to ambush them. Elsa shot the others, including Sheriff Santiago, before allowing Bretnik to avenge the deaths of his family and Cleats; Bretnik shot Canton multiple times, killing him. Elsa then told Bretnik to wipe the data from the computer inside the garage before leaving. Upon exiting the garage, Bretnik was apprehended by Agent Cassidy.

In the present, Shelly informs Bretnik that the medication he takes for his mental trauma causes anxiety and delusions, and tells him that the garage was fully derelict and empty, the morgue he investigated and found bodies in was not in use for years, and that Cleats' decapitated body was found in Bretnik's car. Bretnik, unable to believe whether the events in Wander were true or simply his own delusions, and faced with the possibility that he killed his friend, breaks down.

Bretnik is placed in a holding cell awaiting placement in a mental institution. He is met in his cell by Elsa and an alive-and-well Cleats. They explain to Bretnik that the entire investigation was part of their plan: Bretnik was being used all along as a way to tie up loose ends. Bretnik's mental state ensured he would continue to investigate and allowed them to pin any blame on the events in Wander on him.

In the mental facility, Bretnik barricades himself in his room and digs in his chest with a stolen pen. As he lies on the floor bleeding, he laughs and smiles; in his hand is his own microchip, proving his earlier fears that he had a microchip placed within himself.

Meanwhile, the envelope Bretnik mailed earlier is sent to Shelly. Inside the envelope is all of the evidence and photographs Bretnik took of the laboratory, which could allow the conspiracy to be exposed.

== Cast ==
- Aaron Eckhart as Arthur Bretnik
- Katheryn Winnick as Elsa Viceroy
- Heather Graham as Shelly Luscomb
- Tommy Lee Jones as Jimmy Cleats
- Raymond Cruz as Sheriff Luis Santiago
- Brendan Fehr as Nick Cassidy
- Roger Dorman as Leiland Ashgrave
- Nicole Steinwedell as Tanya
- Jennifer Paredes as Waitress

== Production ==
It was announced in April 2019 that Aaron Eckhart had been cast to star in the film, which would be directed and co-written by April Mullen. In June, Katheryn Winnick was added to the cast, with Heather Graham joining in July. In August, Tommy Lee Jones, Raymond Cruz and Brendan Fehr had been cast.

Filming began in July 2019 in Carrizozo and Ruidoso, New Mexico.

== Release ==
In September 2020, Saban Films acquired the North American distribution rights to the film. It was released on December 4, 2020.

== Reception ==
Rotten Tomatoes, a review aggregator, gave the film an approval rating of 32% based on 22 reviews and an average rating of 5.1/10. The critic's consensus reads: "Wander benefits from Aaron Eckhart's strong leading performance, but his efforts aren't enough to support the story's increasingly cuckoo twists and turns." Metacritic reports a score of 54 out of 100 based on four critic reviews, indicating "mixed or average reviews". Glenn Kenny of RogerEbert.com compared it negatively to Memento (2000), saying that it lacks that film's "fully fleshed out story".
