= C. David Johnson =

Canadian actor (born 1955)

- Born: Christopher David Johnson; November 29, 1955 (age 70); Montreal, Quebec
- Occupation: Actor
- Years active: 1986–present
- Known for: Street Legal
- Spouse: Diane D'Aquila (m. 1987–1992)
- Website: http://www.cdavidjohnson.com/

Christopher David Johnson (born November 29, 1955) is a Canadian actor best known for his role of Chuck Tchobanian on the dramatic television series Street Legal.

== Early life ==
Johnson was born and raised in Montreal, Quebec. He attended Stanstead College, the University of New Brunswick and the Vancouver Playhouse Acting School.

== Career ==
Johnson rose to popularity when he landed the leading role of Charles 'Chuck' Tchobanian on the dramatic television series Street Legal in 1987. The show went on to become one of the most successful TV series in Canadian history. It ran for eight years and Johnson received four consecutive Gemini nominations for Best Performance by an Actor in a Continuing Leading Dramatic Role.

Following the success of Street Legal, Johnson was cast as a regular on the family series Mysterious Island. In 1998 he starred alongside Ted Danson, Jennifer Jason Leigh and Brian Dennehy in the feature film Thanks of a Grateful Nation, an examination of the aftermath of Operation Desert Storm and its effects on the men and women who served in the Gulf War.

Johnson has guest starred on numerous TV series including The Best Years, Zoe Busiek: Wild Card, The Dresden Files and starred in several television movies including The Julie Posey Story (on Lifetime), The Man Who Saved Christmas with Jason Alexander and Ed Asner (CBS) and Terminal Invasion (Sci-Fi Channel).

He has been an occasional guest host of the current events program As It Happens on CBC Radio One.

Johnson made his professional theatre debut with Theatre New Brunswick where he starred in such productions as Cat on a Hot Tin Roof, Misery, Sleuth and in Peter Pan as Captain Hook. He has performed for over thirty years in theatres across Canada and has appeared on the stages of prominent Canadian theatre companies. He has worked extensively at the National Arts Centre in Ottawa. At Soulpepper in Toronto, he won rave reviews for his performances in such productions as The Way of the World, Jitters, and The Play's the Thing for which he received a Dora Award nomination. At the Stratford Festival, Johnson played Captain Von Trapp in The Sound of Music. Among his other noteworthy roles there, he also played Speed, the clownish servant in Two Gentlemen of Verona.

In 2010, he made his Broadway debut as Bob in the musical Priscilla: Queen of the Desert.

In 2019, he appeared in the television series Diggstown.

== Filmography ==
Year	Title	Role	Notes
1987–1994	Street Legal	Charles 'Chuck' Tchobanian	Main role
1988	A New Life	Walter	
1995	Kung Fu: The Legend Continues	Lance Deverell	Episode: "Kung Fu Blues"
1995	Mysterious Island	Jack Pencroft	Recurring role
1999	I Was a Sixth Grade Alien	Principal Grand	15 episodes
2001	The Safety of Objects	Wayne Christianson	
2002	Terminal Invasion	David Higgins	TV movie
2002	The Man Who Saved Christmas	Sam Ryder	TV movie
2005–2008	Delilah & Julius	N/A (voice)	31 episodes
2007	The Dresden Files	Charles Harding	Episode: "The Boone Identity"
2016	Law & Order: Special Victims Unit	Mark Carson	Episode: "Broken Rhymes"
2017	The Blacklist	Caleb Hess	Episode: "The Endling (No. 44)"
2019–2022	Diggstown	Reggie Thompson	Recurring role
2022–2025	Law & Order	Trial Judge Harold Leone	2 episodes
