= Nick Hector =

Canadian filmmaker and educator

- Occupations: Professor; Film Editor; Film Producer
- Years active: 1986 - present

Nick Hector is a British Canadian film producer and editor, and professor of film production at the University of Windsor.

== Career ==
Hector collaborated with Canadian filmmaker Allan King and exclusively cut his films during the last decade of King's career. He won a Gemini Award for editing King's TIFF "Top Ten Canadian Film" Dying at Grace, which the Toronto International Film Festival described as “one of the best ever made in this country”. In 1996 he won the Hot Docs "Best Editing" award for Yvan Patry’s Hand of God. He received a Gemini in 1998 for his work on Yvan Patry’s Hot Docs Best of Festival and Chalmers Award winner Chronique d’un genocide announce. In 2009, he won a Gemini for editing Sturla Gunnarsson’s Air India 182, making him the only editor to be awarded three Gemini Awards for documentary.

Hector's credits include Tim Southam’s Genie-nominated Drowning in Dreams; John Haslett Cuff’s Gemini-winning Crimes of the Heart; Min Sook Lee’s Hogtown: The Politics of Policing and Allan King’s Memory for Max, Claire, Ida and Company. He edited Sturla Gunnarsson's documentary about David Suzuki, Force of Nature: The David Suzuki Movie, which won the People’s Choice Documentary Award at the 2010 Toronto International Film Festival, the Canadian Cinema Editors Award for Best Documentary Editing and also the Directors Guild of Canada's Allan King Award for Excellence in Documentary Filmmaking. In 2014 Hector cut Gunnarsson's TIFF Canadian Top Ten Audience Award winner Monsoon. Most recently, Hector was awarded a Canadian Screen Award for editing the Canadian instalment of Ridley Scott's Life in a Day franchise Canada in a Day.

In addition, Hector served as a co-producer for the documentaries The Perfect Story, Prey, Sharkwater Extinction, Wiebo's War, Thay - The Teacher, War Surgeon, Actuality, and the award-winning El Chogui. He served as series producer for Birth Stories and Love is Not Enough and co-director of the CSA Award-winning series War Story. Hector was nominated for a 2012 Genie Award - Best Feature Documentary for Wiebo's War.

In 2018, Hector completed the movie Sharkwater Extinction after the death of Rob Stewart.

Hector is a member of the Directors Guild of Canada, Canadian Cinema Editors, British Film Editors and American Cinema Editors and holds a Doctorate in Fine Art from the University of Hertfordshire.

== Filmography ==
Year	Title	Role	Notes
1989	Electronic Jam	Editor, Sound Editor	Finalist - Gemini Award for Best Documentary Sound
1991	Nuit et silence	Editor, Sound Editor	Finaliste - Prix Gémeaux meilleur montage documentaire
1996	Hand of God	Editor	HotDocs Award for Best Documentary Editing
1997	Chronique d'un genocide	Editor	Gemini Award for Best Documentary Editing; Finaliste - Prix Gémeaux meilleur montage documentaire
1999	The Dragon's Egg	Editor	Finalist - Gemini Award for Best Documentary Editing
2002	El Chogui	Producer, Editor	Contra el Silencio todas las Voces (Mexico) Award for Best Documentary; La Festival Medias Nord-Sud (Switzerland) Award for Best Independent Film; Los Angeles Latino International Film Festival Award for Best Documentary; San Francisco Latino Film Festival Award for Best in Festival; La Cinemafe Film Festival (New York) Special Jury Prize
2003	Inside Information	Editor	Finalist - Gemini Award for Best Documentary Editing
2003	Dying at Grace	Editor	Gemini Award for Best Documentary Editing; Directors Guild of Canada Award for Best Documentary Team
2005	Memory for Max, Claire, Ida and Company	Editor	Finalist - Gemini Award for Best Documentary Editing; Finalist - Directors Guild of Canada Award for Best Documentary Team
2006	EMPz 4 Life	Editor	Finalist - Directors Guild of Canada Award for Best Documentary Team
2009	Air India 182	Editor	Gemini Award for Best Documentary Editing
2010	Experimental Eskimos	Editor	Directors Guild of Canada's Allan King Award
2011	Force of Nature: The David Suzuki Movie	Editor	Canadian Cinema Editors Award for Best Documentary Editing; Directors Guild of Canada's Allan King Award
2012	Wiebo's War	Producer, Editor	Finalist - Genie Award - Best Feature Documentary; Finalist - Directors Guild of Canada's Allan King; Finalist - Canadian Cinema Editors Award for Best Documentary Editing
2013	Echoes	Editor	Canadian Cinema Editors Award for Best Documentary Editing
2014	War Story	Co-director, Editor	Finalist - Canadian Screen Award for Best Documentary Editing
2015	Monsoon	Editor	Polly Krakora Award for Artistry in Film; Finalist - Canadian Cinema Editors Award for Best Documentary Editing; Finalist - Directors Guild of Canada's Allan King Award
2016	This Changes Everything	Editor	Finalist - Directors Guild of Canada Award for Best Documentary Editing
2017	Canada in a Day	Editor	Canadian Screen Award for Best Documentary Editing
2017	Unfractured	Editor	Finalist - Directors Guild of Canada Award for Best Documentary Editing
2017	How to Prepare for Prison	Editor	Finalist - Canadian Cinema Editors Award for Best Documentary Editing
2018	Sharkwater Extinction	Producer, Editor	Canadian Cinema Editors Award - Best Documentary Editing; Finalist - Directors Guild of Canada Award for Best Documentary Editing
2019	Prey	Co-producer, Editor	HotDocs Special Jury Prize - Canadian Feature; Canadian Cinema Editors Award - Best Feature Documentary Editing; Finalist - Canadian Screen Award - Best Feature Documentary Editing; Finalist - Directors Guild of Canada Award for Best Documentary Editing
2020	Fight to the Finish	Co-producer, Editor	Finalist - Canadian Screen Award - Best History Documentary
2022	The Perfect Story	Co-producer, Editor	Best Canadian Documentary - Calgary International Film Festival; Finalist - Directors Guild of Canada Award for Best Documentary Editing; Finalist - Canadian Cinema Editors Award for Best Documentary Editing; Finalist - Canadian Screen Award - Best Documentary Program
2023	The Man Who Stole Einstein's Brain	Editor, Story Editor	Finalist - Canadian Screen Award - Best History Documentary; Finalist - Canadian Screen Award - Best Documentary Film Editing
2025	Shamed	Editor	Finalist - Directors Guild of Canada Award for Best Documentary Editing
