= The Animal Project =

2013 film

- Film poster
- Directed by: Ingrid Veninger
- Written by: Ingrid Veninger
- Starring: Aaron Poole; Hannah Cheesman; Emmanuel Kabongo
- Cinematography: Cabot McNenly
- Release dates: 11 September 2013 (TIFF); 6 June 2014 (Canada)
- Running time: 90 minutes
- Country: Canada
- Language: English

The Animal Project is a 2013 Canadian drama film written and directed by Ingrid Veninger and starring Aaron Poole, Hannah Cheesman, and Emmanuel Kabongo. It debuted at the Contemporary World Cinema section at the 2013 Toronto International Film Festival.

== Cast ==
- Aaron Poole as Leo
- Hannah Cheesman as Alice
- Jessica Greco as Pippa
- Emmanuel Kabongo as Ray
- Joey Klein as Saul
- Sarena Parmar as Mira
- Johnathan Sousa as Jason
- Jacob Switzer as Sam
- Jo Vannicola as Morag
- Lindsay Owen Pierre as Matteo

== Production ==
Music for the film is by Nick Storring, creating his first feature film score. Due to the film's "naturalistic tone", he notes there's little music. Storring wrote on his blog that Veninger and he "tried numerous types of things with different scenes, and in some of those cases the decision was ultimately no music at all." Friendly Rich & The Lollipop People appear in the film with "Sei Spento il Sole".

== Reception ==
In a story about Canadian films at TIFF in 2013 when the film premiered, Maclean's dubbed Veninger "Toronto’s reigning queen of DIY cinema".

== Release ==
The film premiered at the Contemporary World Cinema section at the 2013 Toronto International Film Festival.

The film has also screened at the St. John's International Women's Film Festival, with a one-hour "making of" talkback section. In November, it will screen at the Denver Film Festival.

== Critical reception ==
Professional ratings
Review scores
Source	Rating
The Globe and Mail	2/4 stars
National Post	2.5/4 stars
NOW Magazine	4/4 stars
Toronto Star	3/4 stars

NOW Magazine commented that "It may not be the sort of hyper-personal near-meta-fiction Veninger defined her career with, but The Animal Project seems to similarly prod the relationship between interiority and outside world." In a review, the magazine gave it their highest rating, "NNNN", declaring it a transitional project for the director, who "upped her game without abandoning any of her characteristic whimsy." They note the film has a narrative story unlike her previous films, and a "more formal visual style".

Highlighting actor Aaron Poole in an article, Torontoist suggested that the film was "heavy with emotional baggage but imbued with a lightness that comes from being partially improvised," suggesting it might "demonstrate a different side of Poole." Ilse de Mucha Herrera for The Arts Scene website suggested that the film is "nothing short of delightful", a "refreshing" film with "a script full of passion with relatable characters and creative sequences," rating it 4/5.

Isabel Cupryn of Canadian Film Review commented: "With pure honesty and unwavering compassion for its characters, it's hard not to fall in love with this quiet, thoughtful film. The Animal Project is like its creator Ingrid Veninger — genuine and true to its heart."

Weekly newspaper The Grid suggested that the use of costumes is "less striking than it's intended to be", but "the good moments... linger vividly in the rearview mirror," offering it 7/10.

Pop culture website Dork Shelf suggested "the scattered moments of human observation that make up the film are almost always careful and poignant," but the overall film premise and characters' "revelatory experiences" "never [feel] genuine." Canadian entertainment website Scene Creek also gave a less than enthused review, 2 out of 5 stars. Critic Danielle La Valle praised the father and son conflict, suggesting it should have been the film's focus, praising Jacob Switzer's "great skill and understatement" in the role. The review cites the dysfunction of Leo needing to disguise himself and offer free hugs at his son's high school, in order to feel comfortable hugging him. She suggests that the concept of obliterating comfort zones with the costumes is incorrect, as the outfits would add a layer of comfort through anonymity.

Toronto Star connected the film with six other Canadian films screening at the festival, all with themes of identity. Critic Linda Barnard deemed it 3/4 stars.

Yahoo! TIFF Blog writer Will Perkins named it among the top five Canadian films screening at the festival.
