= Antibirth =

2016 film by Danny Perez

- Theatrical release poster
- Directed by: Danny Perez
- Screenplay by: Danny Perez
- Produced by: Cole Payne; Natasha Lyonne; Roger M. Mayer; David Anselmo; Justin Kelly; Rob Weston
- Starring: Natasha Lyonne; Chloë Sevigny; Meg Tilly; Mark Webber
- Cinematography: Rudolf Blahacek
- Edited by: Aden Bahadori
- Music by: Eric Copeland; Jonathan J.K. Kanakis
- Production companies: Traverse Media; Hideaway Pictures; WeatherVane Productions; Straightwire Entertainment Group
- Distributed by: IFC Midnight
- Release dates: January 25, 2016 (Sundance); September 2, 2016 (United States)
- Running time: 94 minutes
- Countries: United States; Canada
- Language: English

Antibirth is a 2016 psychedelic body horror film written and directed by Danny Perez, produced by Cole Payne, David Anselmo, Rob Weston and Jeff Rice. It stars Natasha Lyonne, Chloë Sevigny, Meg Tilly, Mark Webber, Maxwell McCabe-Lokos and Emmanuel Kabongo. The film follows a drug-addled woman in a remote Michigan town who becomes pregnant after taking a strange drug. The film premiered at the Sundance Film Festival in January 2016. The film was released in the United States on September 2, 2016, by IFC Midnight.

== Plot ==
Lou (Natasha Lyonne) is a hard-partying stoner who lives in a run-down trailer outside a rural Michigan town where women have recently been going missing. She awakens one morning after a party at an abandoned warehouse and finds herself experiencing bizarre symptoms akin to those experienced during pregnancy. Her friend, Sadie (Chloë Sevigny), believes she is pregnant and not telling her about it, despite Lou's claims that she had no sex with anyone in nearly a year. Lou also believes that it is impossible for her to get pregnant after an upsetting incident six months earlier when she miscarried in a club while on the toilet. After getting a ride from her friend Luke (Emmanuel Kabongo) to her cleaning job at a motel, she encounters an eccentric stranger, Lorna (Meg Tilly), who is staying in one of the hotel rooms.

Meanwhile, Gabriel (Mark Webber), Sadie's drug dealer and boyfriend, is keeping hidden in his apartment a woman who had a grotesque physical reaction to a new drug Gabriel and his friend Warren have been selling to locals. It is revealed that Sadie, who had a child many years ago, is trying to reunite with her estranged offspring, though Gabriel is doubtful it will ever happen. In addition to running drugs (including unstable, experimental drugs, some of which turned an underling's skin inside out), Gabriel works as a pimp; during an encounter between a sex worker and a client, a strange man, apparently familiar to Gabriel and later revealed to be Isaac, watches the intercourse take place, noting his interest in the encounter.

One afternoon, Lou loses consciousness and has bizarre hallucinations in which figures from Funzone, a local family entertainment center, give her a vaginal exam. She awakens to find her stomach protruding, and a blister formed on her foot, which leaks a clear fluid after she cuts it open with a knife. When Lou regains consciousness, Lorna arrives at her trailer unannounced, and asks her if she's experienced a series of odd symptoms and mental fogginess; she claims to be clairvoyant, and noticed that Lou seemed troubled when she had met her at the motel. The two have lunch at the Funzone, and Lorna confesses that she was abducted by an unknown entity while enrolled in the military, an event which led to her being discharged when she questioned her authorities. Lou confronts Warren, who works at the Funzone, about the night before she began experiencing her symptoms; he admits that Gabriel has been "trading" women, mostly runaways, to a mysterious man named Isaac in exchange for drugs to sell.

At her trailer, Lorna shows Lou a scar on her forearm, where she claims an implant was inserted and then forcibly removed while she was in the military. Sadie arrives the next day, and suggests Lou see a doctor, but Lou insists she is not pregnant. Lou, Sadie, and Lorna go to the abandoned warehouse where the party had occurred the night before her symptoms began. There, she has a flashback of being injected with a drug by Gabriel at the party. Sadie confesses that Gabriel had used Lou as a test subject for the new drug—an experimental hormone for women—that he has been selling.

Back at Lou's trailer, Lorna attempts to give Lou a Caesarian section to remove the growth in her stomach. Instead, Lou gives birth to a grotesque, animated disembodied head. Just after the birth, Gabriel and Isaac arrive at the trailer along with another SWAT member who shoots Lorna. Isaac reveals that the military is investigating a way to create a new race that can survive the toxic atmosphere of space (which he has been to several times) and that her lifestyle of hard-drinking and drug use, as well as his secretly pumping toxins into her home, provided an ample womb for their experiment. He tells Lou that she can help him build a new, superior race, but she refuses to continue. As he explains this, arms begin to emerge from her vagina, followed by the whole of her skeleton, leaving her flesh an empty shell. The headless creature attacks and kills both Gabriel and Isaac. A SWAT member enters the trailer after hearing a commotion, and sees the trailer covered in blood, as the full-bodied creature stands in the kitchen, holding its head in its hands.

== Cast ==
- Natasha Lyonne as Lou
- Chloë Sevigny as Sadie
- Meg Tilly as Lorna
- Mark Allen Webber as Gabriel
- Maxwell McCabe-Lokos as Warren
- Emmanuel Kabongo as Luke
- Neville Edwards as Isaac
- Morgan Bedard as Jake
- Corey Pascall as Jackson
- Lili Francks as Anha
- Marie-Josee Dionne as Trish
- Jessica Greco as Donna

== Production ==
The movie started from a desire by Perez to do something more focused on narrative than his usual work. In designing the feature, Perez sought to work with a female lead, telling Daily Dead "narratively and visually I'm more interested in that." He created a script to deliberately "subvert a lot of female archetypes", specifically subverting the idea of how pregnancy is usually depicted as "this image of women as glowing in gestational bliss and being so happy". "No one really talks about the more gruesome aspects of pregnancy and what it does to the body." In creating the narrative, Perez was also inspired by various conspiracy theory enthusiasts as well as "weird UFO YouTube videos".

From the beginning, Perez wrote the film with Natasha Lyonne in mind, whom he was personally friends with, with her officially signing on in May 2014 along with Chloë Sevigny.

== Release ==
The film had its world premiere at the 2016 Sundance Film Festival on January 25, 2016. Shortly after, IFC Midnight acquired distribution rights to the film. The film was released in a limited release and through video on demand on September 2, 2016. It was also shown at the After Dark Film Festival in Toronto, Canada. The movie premiered on Netflix in the United States on January 30, 2017.

=== Critical reception ===
On review aggregator website Rotten Tomatoes, the film holds an approval rating of 68% based on 34 reviews, and an average rating of 5.4/10. The website's consensus reads, "Antibirth's outstanding performances anchor its wilder flights of fancy, making this surreal horror outing from writer-director Danny Perez more than a garish curiosity." On Metacritic, the film has a weighted average score of 56 out of 100, based on 12 critics, indicating "mixed or average" reviews.

Bloody Disgusting gave the film a positive review, calling it "good old body horror movie. It's got the suggestion of pregnancy, so you're dealing with the undertones of a woman's mixed feelings about her own capacity to give life, but if you don't want to go there it's really just gross as hell." The Guardian also gave the film a positive review, drawing comparisons to The Big Lebowski and David Cronenberg's The Brood. The New York Times described the film as resembling a "meth fever dream."

Consequence of Sound gave the film a negative review, saying, "There are at least six different movies in Antibirth, and none of them work in tandem."

== Home media ==
The film was released on Blu-ray and DVD on February 7, 2017, by Scream Factory.
