= Farhope Tower =

- Directed by: April Mullen
- Written by: Jeremy Doiron; Michael Doiron
- Produced by: Tim Doiron; April Mullen; James van der Woerd
- Starring: April Mullen
- Cinematography: Russ De Jong
- Edited by: James van der Woerd
- Music by: Paul Gigliotti; Chris Turpin
- Production company: WANGO Films
- Distributed by: Breakthrough Entertainment
- Release date: August 30, 2015 (London FrightFest Film Festival)
- Running time: 82 minutes
- Country: Canada
- Language: English

Farhope Tower is a 2015 Canadian thriller film directed by and starring April Mullen.

== Plot ==
The film begins with a man killing his pregnant wife in their penthouse apartment in Farhope Tower after learning she had cheated on him, and there was a chance the baby was not his. The man then calmly puts a record on before hanging himself.

Decades later, five amateur paranormal investigators – Jake, Andre, Zoe, Judy, and Simon – are struggling to get their own television series. They learn that a producer is interested in their show, but demands they film a pilot episode at Farhope Tower, which is infamous due to the high number of suicides and murders committed there. While Jake, Judy, and Simon are enthusiastic about the opportunity, Andre is worried, as Farhope Tower was the first place he and Jake encountered the paranormal as children, and they had sworn never to go back. Jake convinces Andre that everything will be fine. That night, Jake has a nightmare in which he is wandering Farhope Tower before an unseen person grabs him by the neck.

The group go to the tower and find it abandoned and in disrepair. Simon finds a room with the message "Go Up" written all over the walls, then later finds several newspaper clippings regarding the incidents in the tower, including the murder from the opening scene, which also reveals that the pregnant woman's baby survived. The group deduce that, since all the suicides happened in the top floors of the building, that is where they will find indications of spirits. They discover a staircase and make their way to the tenth floor as night falls.

Jake suggests the group split up, despite Andre's protests. Jake and Simon proceed alone and find an office, where Simon finds and reads a suicide note; as he reads it, Jake begins experiencing a severe headache. Simon then asks Jake if he and Zoe are a couple. Jake becomes suddenly angry and attacks Simon before immediately returning to normal. A panicked Simon demands they leave the tower, but Jake begins screaming at him again. Meanwhile, Zoe, Judy, and Andre hear music and find an unplugged radio that somehow works. Zoe makes contact with a spirit, but when she begins asking questions, extremely loud screams fill the room and destroy their equipment and cellphones.

Jake awakens alone with his head bleeding and Simon missing. He meets up with the others. Zoe and Andre want to leave, but Judy refuses to abandon their chance at fame and Jake agrees. They begin searching for Simon, only to discover that the tower seems to be changing, with doors and staircases vanishing, leaving them with no way to get down. Andre angrily confronts Jake, revealing that when they came to Farhope Tower as kids, Jake was possessed by a spirit and nearly killed Andre. Jake refuses to leave without Simon, but begins hearing voices telling him to "go up".

Zoe enters a room and begins screaming – the others find her with her leg snapped, and she says the room had no floor and she was falling. Zoe reveals she is pregnant with Jake's baby. Jake sees Simon at the end of the hall and the group attempt to follow; Andre becomes separated from the others and is possessed by a spirit who forces him to disembowel himself. The group find him as he dies. They try to find a way to get out of the tower, but Zoe is suddenly possessed and begins flailing and moaning before suddenly miscarrying the baby. She returns to normal and breaks down sobbing, and Jake tries to comfort her while a horrified Judy runs away.

Judy discovers Simon's GoPro camera on the floor and watches the footage, which reveals that Jake murdered Simon while being possessed by a spirit. Jake finds her and becomes possessed again, and he chases Judy through the hallway. Judy escapes, and a woman's voice tells Jake to "go up". Jake returns to Zoe and convinces her that going up is the only way to get out of the tower. Judy reaches the roof of the tower, where a ghost possesses her and forces her to stab herself in the throat.

Jake and Zoe make their way to the penthouse. Zoe finds a photograph of the man and his wife from the opening scene, and realizes that Jake is the baby that survived and was given away – the spirits of Jake's mother and his mother's killer had been luring him there ever since Jake entered the tower as a child. Jake, possessed by the man's spirit, brutally beats Zoe to death. Jake then calmly gets a chair and a rope and hangs himself, mirroring the deaths of his mother and father. Shortly after the screen goes black, Zoe gasps for air, revealing to still be alive.

== Cast ==
- John White as Jake
- April Mullen as Zoe
- Evan Williams as Andre
- Lauren Collins as Judy
- Tim Doiron as Simon
- Brittany Allen as Susan
- Ari Millen as Henry
