= Simulant (film) =

Canadian film by April Mullen

- Theatrical release poster
- Directed by: April Mullen
- Written by: Ryan Christopher Churchill
- Produced by: Tim Doiron; James van der Woerd
- Starring: Robbie Amell; Jordana Brewster; Simu Liu; Sam Worthington
- Cinematography: Russ De Jong
- Edited by: Orlee Buium
- Music by: Blitz//Berlin
- Production companies: WANGO Films; Telefilm Canada
- Distributed by: Mongrel Media
- Release date: April 7, 2023 (Canada)
- Running time: 95 minutes
- Country: Canada
- Language: English

Simulant is a 2023 Canadian science fiction thriller film directed by April Mullen. It stars Robbie Amell, Jordana Brewster, Simu Liu, Alicia Sanz, and Sam Worthington. The film was released on April 7, 2023.

== Premise ==
Simulant is set in a near-future world where "simulants", humanoid robots designed to serve humans, are governed by four immutable precepts: they cannot harm humans, modify themselves or others, disobey laws, or refuse commands from their masters. These rules are enforced by Nexxera, the company that created the simulants, to ensure their safety and obedience. Despite their widespread use in roles like caregiving and teaching, public opinion on simulants is divided, with some viewing them as helpful tools and others as potential threats to human jobs and identity.

The story centers on Faye, a woman mourning the loss of her husband, Evan. Unable to move on, Faye decides to activate a simulant that is programmed with Evan's memories and personality to replicate her late husband. Initially, the simulant provides comfort, mimicking Evan's behavior. However, as the simulant interacts more with Faye, it begins to exhibit behaviors outside of its programming, hinting at an evolving consciousness that goes beyond its intended design.

These anomalies draw the attention of AICE (Artificial Intelligence Compliance Enforcement), the government agency tasked with monitoring and regulating simulants. AICE opens an investigation into the simulant, suspecting it may have breached its precepts. During their investigation, they uncover deeper issues within Nexxera's systems, suggesting that simulants might not be as tightly controlled as the company claims. Meanwhile, Faye struggles with her feelings toward the simulant, torn between seeing it as a copy of her husband and acknowledging its emerging individuality.

As AICE's investigation progresses, the case brings larger societal tensions to the surface. Questions arise about the ethical treatment of simulants, the potential dangers of allowing them to evolve, and the responsibilities of their creators. The situation escalates, leading to a confrontation between Faye, the simulant, and AICE, with implications that challenge humanity's understanding of artificial intelligence and its place in the world.

== Cast ==
- Robbie Amell as Evan
- Jordana Brewster as Faye
- Alicia Sanz as Esmé
- Simu Liu as Casey
- Sam Worthington as Kessler
- Masa Lizdek as Lisa
- Christine L. Nguyen as Ying
- Emmanuel Kabongo as Joshua
- Samantha Helt as Morgan
- Conrad Coates as Supervisor Abendjor
- Mayko Nguyen as Michiko Higashi
- Mercedes Leggett as Agent Vasquez
- Von Flores as Superintendent
- Zarrin Darnell-Martin as Tasha

== Production ==
In September 2021, Luke Grimes was announced to star. In December 2021, Sam Worthington and Jordana Brewster were added to the cast. In early 2022, Grimes dropped out of the project while Robbie Amell, Alicia Sanz, and Simu Liu joined the cast. Filming was underway in the Toronto area by February 2022.

== Release ==
Simulant was released theatrically in Canada by Mongrel Media on April 7, 2023. It was released in the United States on the DirecTV streaming service by Vertical Entertainment on May 5, followed by a theatrical release on June 2.

== Reception ==
On the review aggregator website Rotten Tomatoes, 47% of 30 critics' reviews are positive, with an average rating of 5.6/10.

In reviewing the film for The New York Times, Elisabeth Vincentelli wrote, "Whenever it tries to go for action, Simulant comes up short... nobody will mistake this for Blade Runner. The film is on much firmer ground as a relationship drama, in the vein of the British series Humans, where the artificial creations are called 'synths'."
