= April Mullen =

Canadian actress and filmmaker

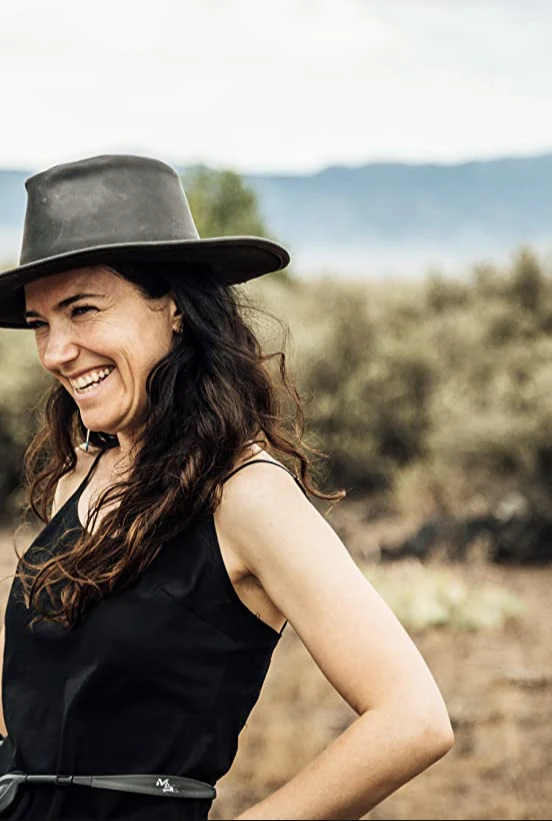
Mullen on set in 2020

April Mullen (/ˈmʊlən/) is a Canadian director, actress, and producer.

== Career ==
In 2012, Mullen became the first woman to direct a live action, fully stereoscopic 3D feature film, Dead Before Dawn (2012). In 2015, she directed the neo-noir exploitation feature film 88 (2015).

In 2016, Mullen directed Below Her Mouth in 2016, which was an official selection at the 2016 Toronto International Film Festival. She was one of several honorees of the Birks Diamond Tribute celebrating Canadian women in film during the 2016 festival. The Globe and Mail profiled her "female gaze" on the film. Following the 2016 festival, she signed with Verve.

In 2017, Mullen directed the action feature film Badsville. In 2020, she directed the thriller feature film Wander. In 2023, she directed the sci-fi film Simulant.

== Personal life ==
She grew up in Niagara Falls, Ontario, and now lives in Los Angeles.

== Accolades ==
Mullen was added to the Niagara Falls Arts and Culture Wall of Fame in 2016.

== Filmography ==
Year	Role	Actor	Director	Producer	Screenwriter	notes
2000	The Ladies Man	Young Love				Movie
2003	1-800-Missing	Cara Crenshaw				Television
2004	72 Hours: True Crime	Rachel Emery				Television
2004	Cavedweller	Dede				Movie
2004	Suburban Madness	Jesse James				TV film
2005	Rose	Vanisha				TV film
2005	A History of Violence	youth at diner				Movie
2007	Rock, Paper, Scissors: The Way of the Tosser	Holly Brewer	Yes	Yes	Yes	Movie
2009	Howie Do It	Actress				TV series, 8 episodes
2010	GravyTrain	Miss Uma Booma	Yes	Yes		Movie
2011	Scare Tactics	Actress				Television
2011	Papillon	The Nun				Television
2012	Good God	Kathy Duncan				TV series, 10 episodes
2012	Dead Before Dawn	Becky Fords	Yes	Yes		Movie
2013	Making of Dead Before Dawn 3D			Yes		short form documentary
2015	88	Lemmy	Yes		Yes	Movie
2015	Farhope Tower	Zoe	Yes			Movie
2016	Aftermath		Yes			Television
2016	Real Detective		Yes			TV documentary
2016-2017	Killjoys		Yes			Television
2016	Below Her Mouth		Yes			Movie
2017	Badsville		Yes			Movie
2017	Bellevue		Yes			Television
2017	Wynonna Earp		Yes			Television
2018	Imposters		Yes			Television
2018	Legends of Tomorrow		Yes			Television
2018	Lethal Weapon		Yes			Television
2018-2019	The Rookie		Yes			Television
2019	Ransom		Yes			Television, 1 episode
2020	Wander		Yes			Movie
2023	Simulant		Yes			Movie

== See also ==
- List of female film and television directors
- List of LGBT-related films directed by women
