= Sturla Gunnarsson =

Icelandic-Canadian film director (born 1951)

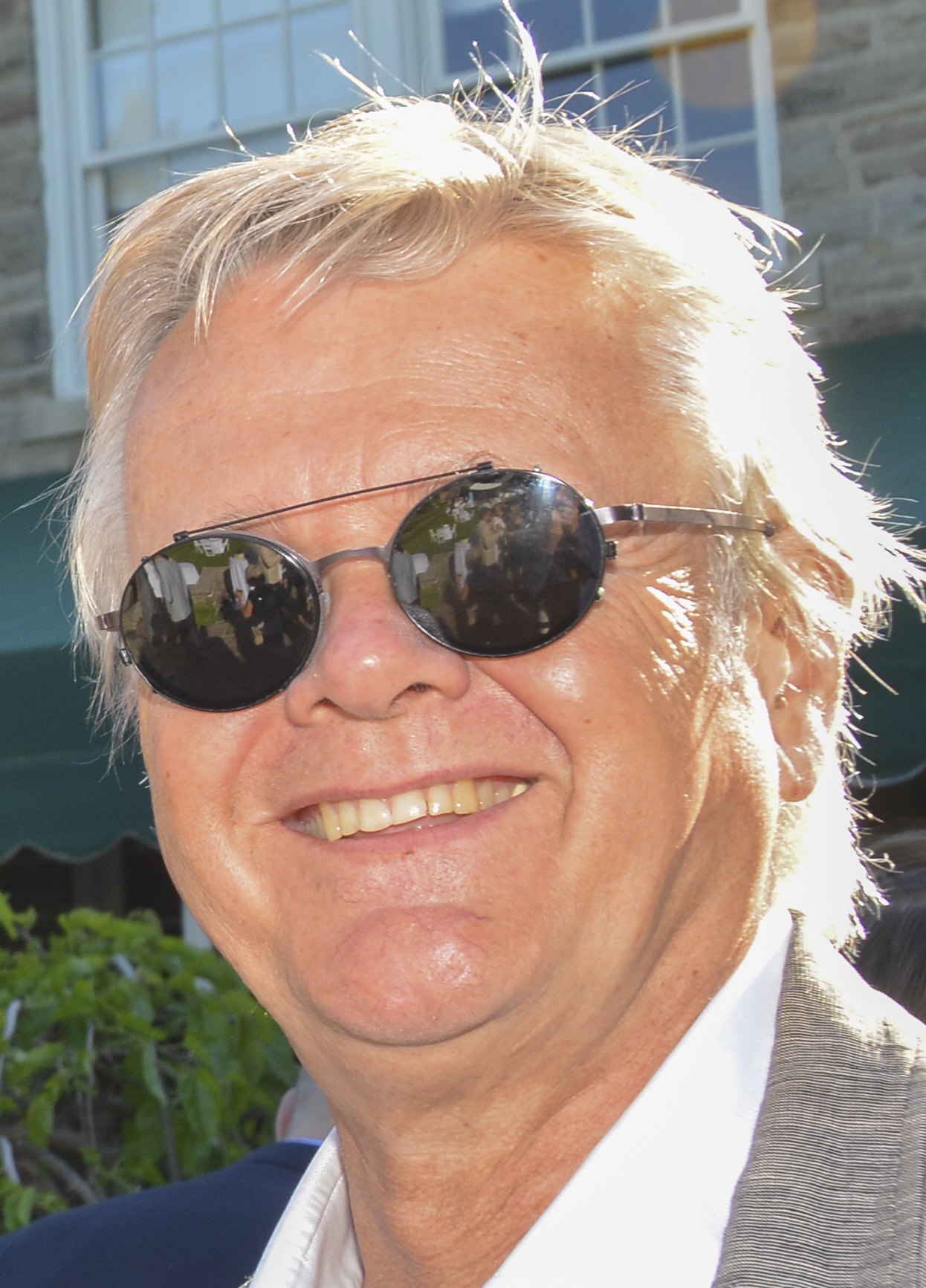
- Born: August 30, 1951 (age 75); Reykjavík, Iceland
- Occupations: Film director, film producer
- Years active: 1981–present
- Website: www.sturlagunnarsson.com

Sturla Gunnarsson (born August 30, 1951) is an Icelandic-Canadian film and television director and producer.

Gunnarsson was born in Reykjavík in 1951. He moved to Vancouver, British Columbia, with his parents when he was seven years old. As he grew up he became interested in filmmaking and went to the University of British Columbia where he completed undergraduate studies in English literature and graduate work in film studies. Part of the graduate program requires the production of a film. His student film, A Day Much Like the Others, went on to win the Norman McLaren Award at the Canadian Student Film Festival, as well as an award at the European Student Film Festival. It was also screened at New York City's Museum of Modern Art.

With his formal education behind him, Gunnarsson moved to Toronto and worked initially at the National Film Board (NFB). His first NFB project, After the Axe, received an Academy Award nomination for Best Documentary Feature. He has since won a number of awards including Emmy Award, Genie Award and Gemini Awards, a Prix Italia, and the Prix Villes de Cannes.

His documentary about David Suzuki, Force of Nature: The David Suzuki Movie, won the People's Choice Documentary Award at the 2010 Toronto International Film Festival.

In 2018, Gunnarsson worked with film and story editor Nick Hector to complete the movie Sharkwater Extinction after the death of Rob Stewart.

== Features and TV movies ==
- A Day Much Like the Others (1979)
- After the Axe (1982-P)
- Final Offer (TV 1985-P)
- Where Is Here? (1987-P)
- Diplomatic Immunity (1991-P)
- North of 60 (1993)
- Scales of Justice (1991–95, TV): Episodes "Regina v Stewart", "Regina v Truscott", "Regina v Gamble & Nichols"
- The Diary of Evelyn Lau (TV 1993)
- We the Jury (TV 1996)
- Mother Trucker: The Diana Kilmury Story (TV 1996)
- Gerrie & Louise (1997)
- Joe Torre: Curveballs Along the Way (TV 1997)
- Such a Long Journey (1998)
- Dangerous Evidence: The Lori Jackson Story (TV 1999)
- Ricky Nelson: Original Teen Idol (TV 1999)
- Scorn (TV 2000)
- Rare Birds (2001)
- The Man Who Saved Christmas (TV 2002)
- 100 Days in the Jungle (TV 2002)
- Above and Beyond (TV 2005)
- Beowulf & Grendel (2005-P)
- Air India 182 (TV documentary 2008)
- Force of Nature: The David Suzuki Movie (2010)
- Ice Soldiers (2013)
- Monsoon (2014)

== Awards ==
- International Emmy Award in 1997, for Gerrie & Louise
- Genie Award in 1986, for Final Offer
- Gemini Awards
- Prix Italia
- Prix Villes de Cannes
- Cadillac People's Choice Documentary Award at the Toronto International Film Festival in 2010, for Force of Nature: The David Suzuki Movie
- Canada's Top Ten Film Festival People's Choice Award, awarded in January 2015 for Monsoon
