= Dead Before Dawn =

Dead Before Dawn 3D
- Film poster
- Directed by: April Mullen
- Written by: Tim Doiron
- Produced by: April Mullen; Tim Doiron
- Starring: Devon Bostick; Martha MacIsaac; Christopher Lloyd; Brandon Jay McLaren; Brittany Allen; April Mullen; Tim Doiron; Kyle Schmid
- Cinematography: Daniel Grant
- Edited by: Luke Higinson
- Music by: James Robertson
- Production company: WANGO Films
- Distributed by: Gaiam Vivendi (US)
- Release date: October 11, 2012
- Running time: 88 minutes
- Country: Canada
- Language: English
- Box office: $608,881

Dead Before Dawn (also known as Dead Before Dawn 3D) is a 2012 Canadian adventure-horror comedy film directed by April Mullen, written by Tim Doiron, and starring Devon Bostick, Martha MacIsaac, and Christopher Lloyd. It introduces "zemons", a combination of zombie and demon. It is Canada's first stereoscopic live-action 3D feature film, and Mullen is the first woman to direct a live-action, fully stereoscopic 3D feature film.

== Plot ==
Casper Galloway, an overcautious boy, has become afraid of anything dangerous since the day his father died in an accident at the Occult Barn, his grandfather Horus's shop. When Horus receives a lifetime achievement award, Casper mans the shop so Horus can collect the trophy. Horus warns "no one is to come within spitting distance" of an urn kept on a high shelf topped with a skull. Horus goes on to explain that Casper's great grandfather Gilbert Galloway imprisoned a malevolent spirit inside the urn and it will curse the person that lets it out.

Charlotte, the girl Casper has a crush on, visits and he tries impressing her with a free purchase for loyal patronage to the Occult Barn. However, more of their friends arrive and make the situation worse. Casper takes down the urn to show off to Charlotte and clumsily drops it. Casper tries warning them of the danger, but they laugh at him, thinking him to be paranoid. Skeptical, they invent a curse of their own: anyone with whom they make eye contact with after 10pm (since midnight is cliche) will kill themselves and come back as a "zemon", a zombie possessed by the evil demonic spirit entrapped in the urn. The zemons spread their infection through hickeys rather than bites, and those infected kill themselves and become zemons. As an additional rule, if someone gives a zemon a French kiss, the zemon will become their slave. They are given until morning to undo the curse, or else they're cursed for eternity. However, they neglect to come up with an easier way to break the curse.

When Casper spends the entire evening preparing for the curse, his concerned mother believes him to be on drugs. Once 10 o'clock comes, Casper decides the curse is fake, makes eye-contact with his mother, and explains something happened at the Occult Barn, ending her worries. At a football game, players and cheerleaders begin killing themselves, and Casper and his friends realize the curse they made up has come true. Casper finds his mother dropped a toaster into the bathtub with her, and he flees when she comes back a zemon. Luckily, she's hit by a car, but Casper accidentally makes eye-contact with a passenger, forcing him to run again. He bumps into his best friend Becky, whose boyfriend had turned into a zemon earlier that night, and she says she now believes that the curse is coming true and that Casper was right. The two of them realize that the others are still at the football game and rush to their rescue. Once they arrive, Casper and Becky see the field covered with the bodies of the game's attendees and their friends are the only ones standing. The zemons awaken shortly after and chase down the group. They track down Casper's friend Seth, another member of the gang, to warn him about the curse. Seth, who had ignored the curse, reveals to the others that he had made eye-contact with everyone he met that night, thus speeding things up. The zemons manage to catch up to the group and attempt to attack them in Seth's house, but Casper and his friends escape in Seth's Winnebago.

Everyone plans to search the Occult Barn's books for the way to break the curse. Horus returns, horrified to learn of the idiocy that occurred in his absence. Before he can explain how to undo the curse, he succumbs to it and jams his trophy into his skull; however, he tells them they have to dig. They retrieve the items needed to seal the spirit again: the ashes from the previous urn (which Casper had stored in his backpack), a human skull (one of which, according to Dazzle, is in the anthropology classroom at their college), a heart (which they dissect from a toad), an urn (later replaced by one of Seth's mugs after Dazzle succumbs to the zemon curse and breaks it), and the watch belonging to Horus's father (which they have to get out of his grave). However, most of the group is killed by the zemons along the way (or in Seth's case, gets knocked unconscious), leaving only Casper and Charlotte. A final line in the instructions reveals that Casper must give his life to undo the curse. He sets off a grenade, ready to die, but instead time rewinds to the moment right before the urn broke; everyone retains memory of what happened, ensuring they don't cause another curse.

When Casper and Charlotte graduate, they visit Horus and explain that they wish to become Occult Barn employees to pay for their new place. Overjoyed, Horus decides to take his first vacation ever; his attire suggests, he is going to Hawaii. After he leaves, the couple make out and accidentally knock down the urn. Horrified, they state, "We're so dead."

== Cast ==
- Devon Bostick as Casper Galloway
- Christopher Lloyd as Horus Galloway
- Martha MacIsaac as Charlotte Baker
- Brandon Jay McLaren as Ricky "Dazzle" Darlington
- April Mullen as Becky Fords
- Brittany Allen as Lucy Winthrop
- Kyle Schmid as Patrick Bishop
- Tim Doiron as Seth Munday
- Kevin McDonald as Professor Reginald Duffy
- Ellen Dubin as Beverly Galloway
- Rossif Sutherland as Burt Rumsfeld
- Dru Viergever as Zemon Josh
- Max Topplin as Dave
- Boyd Banks as Gas Station Attendant

== Production ==
The film was shot entirely stereoscopic 3D in 20 days in and around the Niagara Region of Canada in 2011. For their environmentally friendly practices, the film was awarded the Green Screen Award by Planet in Focus. April Mullen used a new, immersive approach to the 3D found in the film. WANGO Films focused heavily on 3D throughout the conception of the idea; writing the script, choosing the locations, deciding blocking, designing the shots and makeup all with the 3D in mind. The film was shot on two Red One cameras.

== Release ==
The film has sold internationally and Gaiam Vivendi picked up all rights in the United States. The film premiered in North America at the Tiff Next Wave Film Festival. It was released to Canadian theaters and on video on demand 2 August 2013, and it was theatrically released in America on 6 September 2013. It was released on home video 1 October 2013.

== Reception ==
Lauren Taylor of Bloody Disgusting rated it 1.5/5 stars and wrote that the film has "moments of hilarity" but is "more concept than substance." Anthony Arrigo of Dread Central rated it 2/5 stars and wrote, "Dead Before Dawn makes a commendable effort to introduce something new to the world of zombies, but those fresh concepts quickly lose their luster under the weight of a nonsensical script and hackneyed characters that will hold little value to audiences." Gary Goldstein of the Los Angeles Times called it a "grade-Z horror comedy" that "makes the Scary Movie spoofs look positively brainy." HorrorNews.net called it "a fresh perspective on a popular horror theme". Frank Scheck of The Hollywood Reporter stated that "the broad, sophomoric gags generate few if any real laughs".

=== Awards ===
The film won the Perron Crystal Award while in Belgium for Best Live Action 3D feature film. The award was given by the Stereo Media Film Festival in conjunction with the International 3D Society.
