= After the Axe =

1982 film directed by Sturla Gunnarsson

- Film poster
- Directed by: Sturla Gunnarsson
- Written by: Steve Lucas
- Produced by: Sturla Gunnarsson; Arthur Hammond; Steve Lucas
- Narrated by: Roger Mattiussi
- Cinematography: Andreas Poulsson
- Edited by: Roger Mattiussi
- Production company: National Film Board of Canada
- Release date: 1982
- Country: Canada
- Language: English
- Budget: $452,017

After the Axe is a 1982 Canadian drama film about executive firings directed by Sturla Gunnarsson.

== Summary ==
The film explores the experiences of managers getting fired and the emergence of a new industry specialized in handling such terminations.

Wilson, a senior marketing executive, is laid off from a food company after fifteen years of good service. Losing his status and security, he is relegated to the role of dependent house husband, resented by his children and shunned by former colleagues.

== Cast ==
- James B. Douglas as Biff Wilson
- Janine Manatis as Wife
- Anne Christison as Daughter
- Randy Solomon as Son
- Roger Mattiussi as Narrator (voice)
- Eric Barton as Himself (relocation counsellor)
- Jim Paupst as Himself
- Stanley Warshaw as Himself (Forty Plus Club, N.Y.C.)

== Production ==
The film was a co-production between the Canadian Broadcasting Corporation and National Film Board of Canada and was filmed in 1981. It had a budget of $452,017 (equivalent to $1,499,418 in 2025.

== Reception ==
Writing in Cinema Canada, Gary Lamphier stated that Gunnarsson and Lucas "establish Biff's decline and subsequent resurrection with economy and a sense of style."

It was nominated for an Academy Award for Best Documentary Feature. Despite its Oscar nomination in the documentary category, After the Axe is closer to a docufiction film, made with the cooperation of members of the Canadian business community, which provided locations and helped script scenes during filming. The film's protagonist, D.R. "Biff" Wilson, is a composite character based on the filmmakers' conversations with fired executives, while the other Canadian executives play themselves.

== See also ==
- Docufiction
- List of docufiction films
- The War Game - Peter Watkins's 1965 Oscar-winning Cold War docufiction

== Works cited ==
- Evans, Gary (1991). In the National Interest: A Chronicle of the National Film Board of Canada from 1949 to 1989. University of Toronto Press. ISBN 0802027849.
