= Barry Stevens (filmmaker) =

Canadian filmmaker

Barry Stevens (born 1952) is a Toronto-based writer and filmmaker.

In 1997 he co-wrote (with Steven Silver) the International Emmy Award-winning documentary Gerrie & Louise, about the South African Truth Commission. Since this time he has devoted himself almost exclusively to documentary work, writing and directing several critically acclaimed documentaries including Offspring (2001) which won the Donald Brittain Award, the IDFA Audience Award, and was nominated for an Emmy and a Grierson, The Bomber's Dream (2006), Bio-Dad (2009) and Prosecutor (2010).

Through the making of Offspring and Bio-Dad, which chronicled the search for his own sperm-donor father, Stevens discovered he was one of 1000 potential offspring of Dr. Bertold P. Wiesner, who ran a London-based fertility clinic between 1943 and 1962.

== Awards and nominations ==
=== For Diary of Evelyn Lau ===
- 1995: Gemini Award for "Best writing in a Dramatic Program or Mini-Series"

=== For Gerrie and Louise ===
- 1998: (with Steven Silver) Gemini Award for "Best Writing in a Documentary Program or Series"
- 1998: (with Steven Silver) Writers Guild of Canada Award

=== For Offspring ===
- 2001: Amsterdam International Film Festival Audience Award
- 2001: Nominated for Chicago International Film Festival Gold Hugo Award for "Best Documentary"
- 2002: Writers Guild of Canada Award

=== For The Bombers Dream ===
- 2007: Writers Guild of Canada Award for "Best Writing in a Documentary"

=== For War Story ===
- 2014: 2nd Canadian Screen Awards for "Best Direction in a Documentary Series" ("Ortona: The War Inside")
- 2017: 5th Canadian Screen Awards for "Best Direction in a Documentary Series" ("The Long Way Home")
