= The Edge of Sleep (podcast) =

Thriller podcast

- Genre: Thriller; science fiction
- Language: English

Creative team
- Written by: Jake Emmanuel; Willie Block
- Directed by: Jake Emmanuel

Cast and voices
- Starring: Mark Fischbach

Production
- Production: QCode; Wood Elf
- Length: 25–30 minutes

Publication
- No. of seasons: 1
- No. of episodes: 8
- Original release: September 24, 2019 – present

The Edge of Sleep is a thriller podcast written by Jake Emanuel and Willie Block and started in 2019. It is produced by QCode and stars Mark Fischbach, known online as "Markiplier." It has been adapted into a novel and a television series.

== Background ==
The show is produced by QCode and stars Mark Fischbach. The first season debuted on September 24, 2019, and ended on November 5, 2019. The supporting cast included Alex Essoe, Cara Santana, Victor Rasuk, Marcia Cross, Pat Healy, Michael Yama, Joshua Burge, Chris Mulkey and Rob Morrow. The first season consisted of eight episodes with an average length of 25 minutes each. The show follows a night watchman named Dave Torres who attempts to survive a mysterious global crisis where anyone who goes to sleep dies. The show has a similar premise to Invasion of the Body Snatchers.

In April 2022, a second season of the podcast was announced with an expected release sometime that year. However, production has not begun as of 2024, with series writer Jake Emmanuel saying on Twitter "production has been hard to pin down simply because of everyone’s schedules" as well as revealing the second season is "fully written" and will be "11 episodes long."

== Adaptations ==
=== Novelization (2023) ===
In June 2023, a novelization titled The Edge of Sleep: A Novel was published, written by Emanuel, Block, and Jason Gurley, which expands on the universe of the podcast with new characters and perspectives.

=== Television series (2024) ===
In April 2021, QCode partnered with New Regency to adapt The Edge of Sleep into a television series. The show was filmed in Vancouver in the summer of 2021 and was released on October 15, 2024 on Prime Video. Fischbach reprises his role as Dave, with Lio Tipton as Katie, Eve Harlow as Linda, and Franz Drameh as Matteo. The show is directed by Corey Adams.

On September 30, 2024, Mark Fischbach announced a release date of October 18 through a video on his YouTube channel, but was unable to reveal where it would be released. On October 15, the show was released early on Amazon Prime Video, prompting Fischbach to issue a new video on his YouTube channel announcing it was out. Marketing for the show began on the original scheduled release date of October 18.

Supporting cast members include Carlo Rota, Lisa Durupt, Luis Javier, Connor Kendall, Marci T. House, Clay St. Thomas, Patti Allan, Makia, Danny Dworkis, Braden Overwater, Trezzo Mahoro, Ivan Pecuh, Greg Stewart, and Zinaid Memisevic in a posthumous appearance.

== Characters ==
=== Main characters ===
Dave Torres
Played by Mark Fischbach (Note: Credited as 'Markiplier' in the television series) (podcast and TV series); Sander Argabrite (young, podcast) and Connor Kendall (young, TV series)
A nightwatchman for Daxalab who has been plagued by disturbing dreams since childhood, which have manifested as violent physical actions but may hold the key to solving what is happening to cause people to die in their sleep.

Katie Dowd
Played by Alex Essoe (podcast); Lio Tipton (TV series)
Dave's estranged ex-girlfriend. She is a recovering drug addict who left Dave after a particularly traumatic incident with Dave during one of his nightmares.

Matteo León
Played by Victor Rasuk (podcast); Franz Drameh (TV series)
Dave's co-worker and best friend at Daxalab, and a former US Air Force veteran.

Linda Russo
Played by Cara Santana (podcast); Eve Harlow (TV series)
A nurse at the Santa Mira Hospital and sole survivor after all other staff die in their sleep, who joins Dave and Matteo as they attempt to find out what is causing the deaths. She formerly worked for the pharmaceutical company Cynagen.

=== Recurring characters ===
Dr. Luis Castaneda
Played by Carlo Rota (TV series)
A doctor specialising in studying dreams, who developed the Dream Chamber and attempted to treat a young Dave Torres.

Safet (Note: 'The Old Man' in the podcast)
Played by Michael Yama (podcast); Luis Javier (TV series)
The leader of a mysterious sect known by Dave as the "Dream People". He was not named during the podcast.

Tracey Torres
Played by Marcia Cross (podcast); Lisa Durupt (TV series)
Dave's mother. She took Dave to a sleep specialist during childhood to get to the root of his parasomnia.

Ruth Nelson
Played by Patti Allan (TV series)
An elderly patient with terminal cancer at Santa Mira Hospital and mother of one of Katie's friends.
