= The Edge of Sleep =

The Edge of Sleep may refer to:

- The Edge of Sleep (podcast), a thriller podcast that started in 2019
- The Edge of Sleep (TV series), a 2024 TV series that adapts the podcast
- The Edge of Sleep: A Novel, a 2023 book based on the podcast
