= Markiplier =

American YouTuber (born 1989)

- Fischbach in 2022
- Born: Mark Edward Fischbach; June 28, 1989 (age 37); Honolulu, Hawaii, U.S.
- Education: Milford High School; University of Cincinnati (dropped out)
- Occupations: YouTuber; actor; film director; screenwriter; producer
- Spouse: Amy Nelson (m. 2025)

YouTube information
- Channel: Markiplier
- Years active: 2012–present
- Genres: Let's Play; comedy; vlog
- Subscribers: 39 million
- Views: 24 billion
- Markiplier's voice Fischbach's voice, as heard in his video My longest hello everybody ever. Recorded June 28, 2017
- Last updated: October 31, 2026

Mark Edward Fischbach (/ˈfɪʃˌbɑːk/ FISH-bahk; born June 28, 1989), known professionally as Markiplier, is an American YouTuber, filmmaker, and actor. One of the most popular YouTubers on the platform, he is known for his "Let's Play" videos of indie horror games. He was listed by Forbes as the third-highest-paid content creator on the platform in 2022, and has won four Streamy Awards and a Golden Joystick Award. He has spun off his YouTube fame into a notable media career, venturing into acting and filmmaking.

After joining YouTube in 2012, Fischbach became popular on the platform with Let's Plays of Amnesia: The Dark Descent and the Five Nights at Freddy's series; as of August 7th, 2026, his channel has over 38.8 million subscribers. He signed with talent agency William Morris Endeavor in 2016. While with the agency, he released a clothing line, wrote and directed the YouTube Original series A Heist with Markiplier (2019) and In Space with Markiplier (2022), and hosted or co-hosted two podcasts, which reached No. 1 on Spotify.

In 2023, Fischbach signed with United Talent Agency and was nominated for a Children's and Family Emmy Award. He starred in the series The Edge of Sleep (2024) and made his theatrical debut directing, producing, writing, and starring in the horror film Iron Lung (2026).

== Early life and education ==
Mark Edward Fischbach was born on June 28, 1989, in Honolulu, Hawaii. His father, Cliffton Morris Fischbach Jr., was a German American military officer who met his mother, Sunok Frank, while stationed in South Korea. Fischbach's maternal grandfather was a North Korean defector, and his maternal family history is covered in the 2022 documentary film Markiplier from North Korea.

After Fischbach was born, the family moved to Cincinnati, Ohio, but his parents divorced when he was still young. Fischbach graduated from Milford High School in 2007 and enrolled at the University of Cincinnati in a biomedical engineering program. His father died in 2008 when Fischbach was 18 years old. Fischbach met Wade Barnes in sixth grade and roomed with Bob Muyskens in his freshman year of college—they would both become his long-term friends and collaborators.

In 2012, Fischbach was beset by many different issues: he went through a breakup, was laid off from his job, moved to an apartment after his mother kicked him out of her house, had an emergency appendectomy, and went into debt. After being hospitalized because of an adrenal tumor, he "decided that he wanted to do something else."

== Career ==
=== YouTube ===
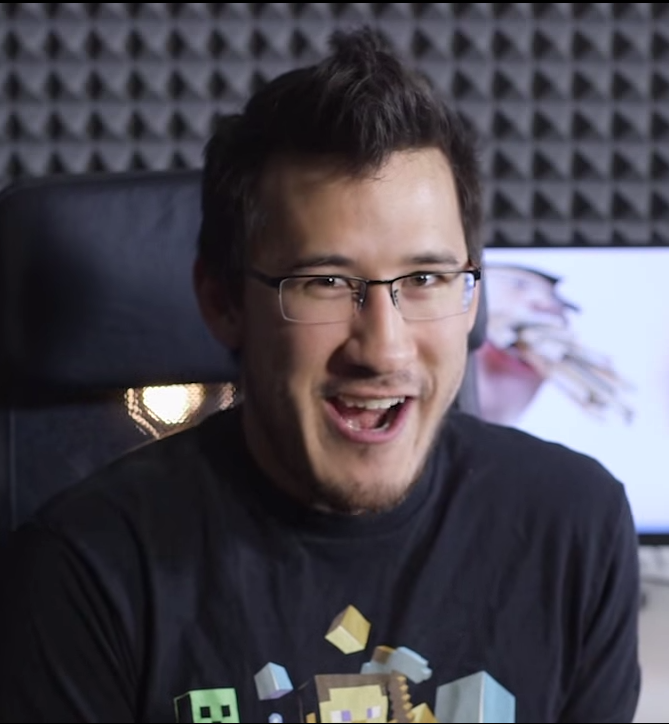
Fischbach in 2014

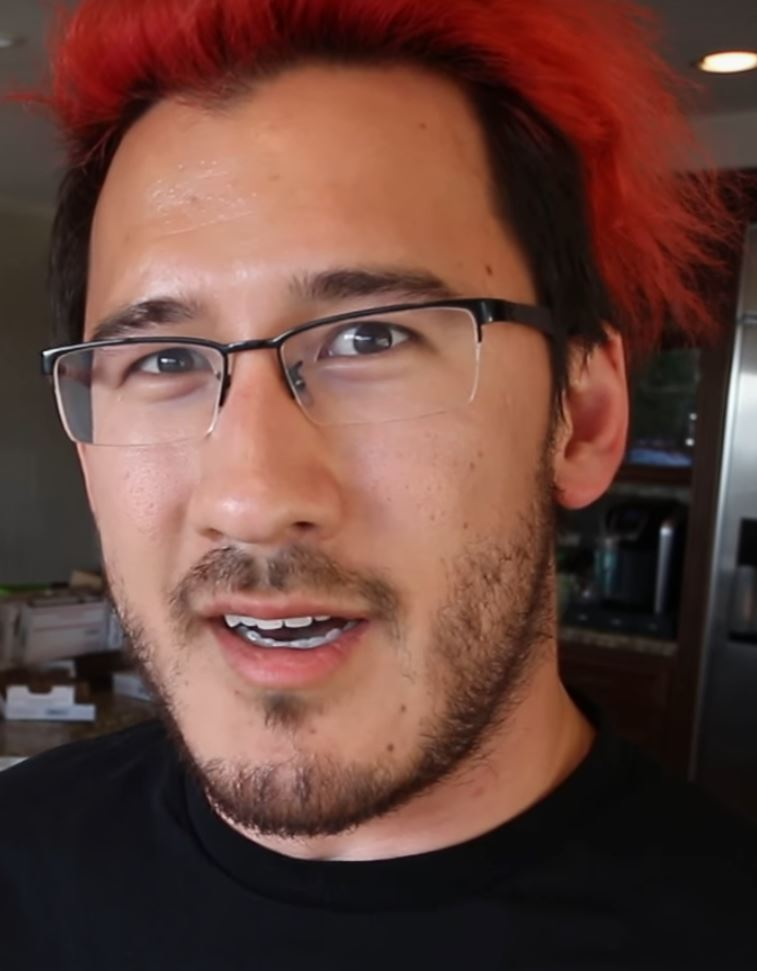
Fischbach in 2016

Fischbach registered his first YouTube channel on March 6, 2012. He originally intended to upload comedy sketches and action videos. He named the channel "Markiplier", a portmanteau of Mark and multiplier, as he would be portraying all the characters in the sketches. Fischbach later said it was a "really dumb name". However, Fischbach also had a lifelong interest in video games and decided to make gaming videos while the trend was growing. His first series was a Let's Play of Amnesia: The Dark Descent (2010), and the channel reached over 94,000 subscribers within the year.

YouTubers with over one thousand subscribers were then eligible to earn money under YouTube's AdSense program. However, Fischbach had problems with his AdSense account which prevented him from monetizing his videos, and he was forced to move to his current channel in April, originally named "markiplierGAME", now named "Markiplier". He dropped out of college the same year to support his growing online career, only two semesters away from graduating. In early 2014, Fischbach moved to Los Angeles to be closer to potential business opportunities.

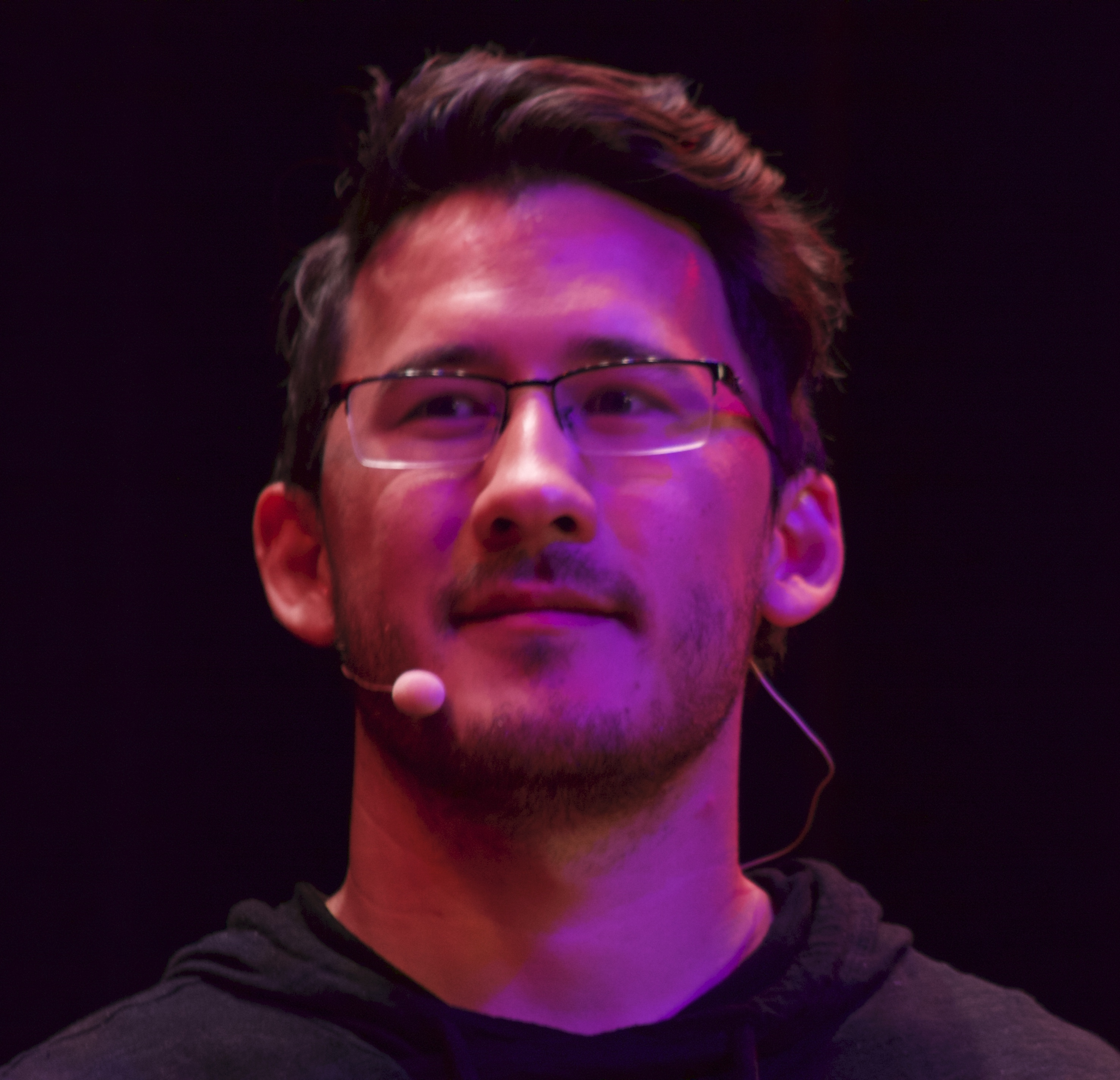
Fischbach in 2015

Fischbach and Janet Varney co-hosted the 2015 South by Southwest Gaming Awards, and he was featured in YouTube Rewind. He was ranked sixth in a list of the twenty most influential celebrities among teenagers in the United States. Fischbach and fellow YouTuber Jenna Mae appeared on Jimmy Kimmel Live! in September 2015, following backlash Kimmel received regarding jokes he made about YouTube and Let's Play videos.

Fischbach began living with fellow YouTubers Daniel Kyre and Ryan Magee, who ran the YouTube channel Cyndago. In September 2015, Kyre was found in critical condition after attempting suicide in his room. He was hospitalized but was taken off life support two days later. Cyndago was disbanded, and Fischbach went on hiatus from YouTube for a month before returning on October 5. He reached ten million subscribers on the 14th.

In November 2016, Fischbach signed with talent agency William Morris Endeavor (WME). His first project with WME was his "You're Welcome Tour" in Spring 2017, in which Fischbach and four other YouTubers—Muyskerm, Barnes, Tyler Scheid, and Ethan Nestor—performed 31 shows across the United States and Europe. Fischbach had said to Variety that he was interested in more traditional entertainment. Taking five months to plan, he incorporated musical, comedy, and improv elements and audience participation in the tour. In January 2018, Fischbach began producing exclusive content for Twitch as part of a deal with Disney Digital Network.

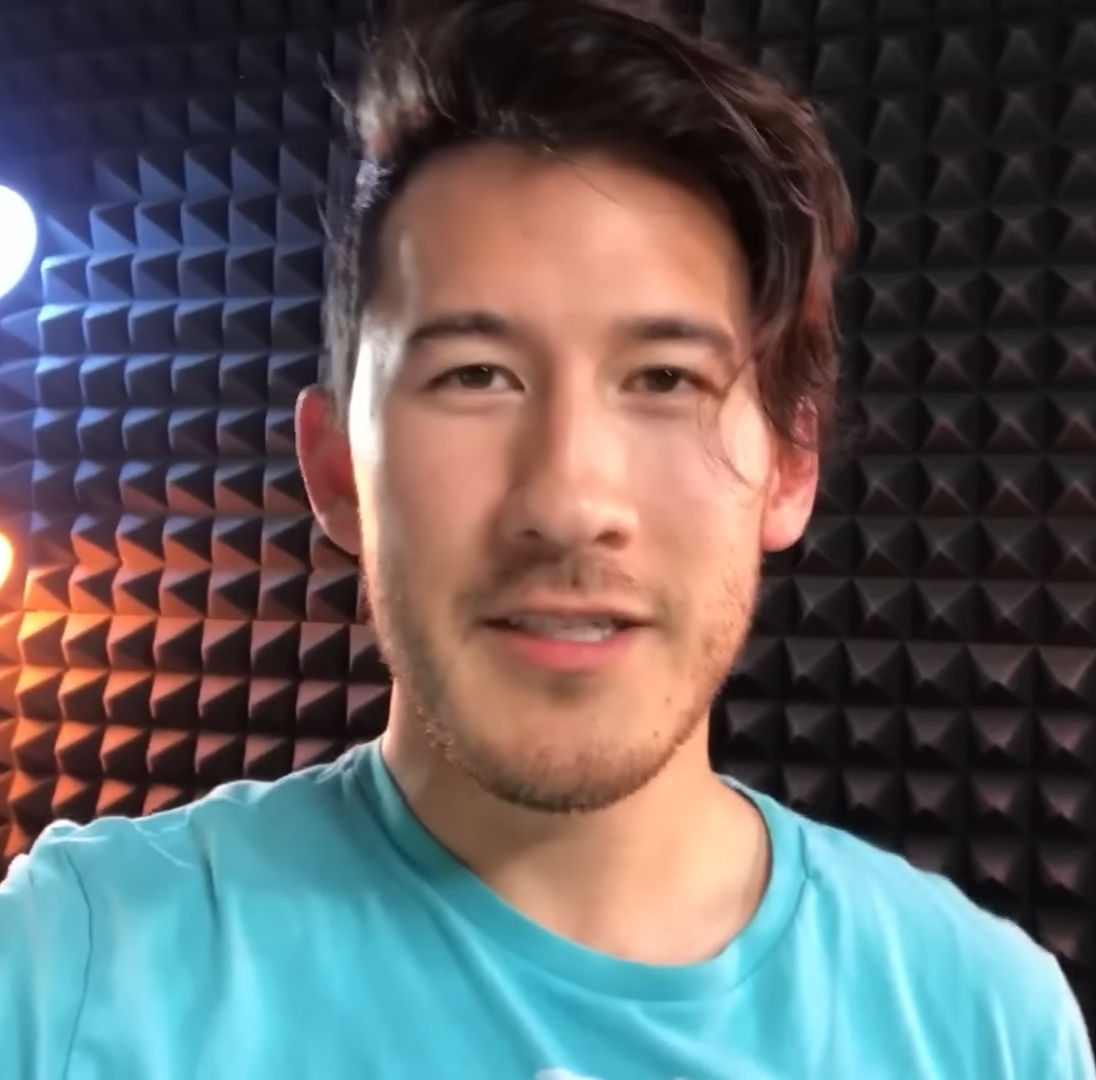
Fischbach in 2017

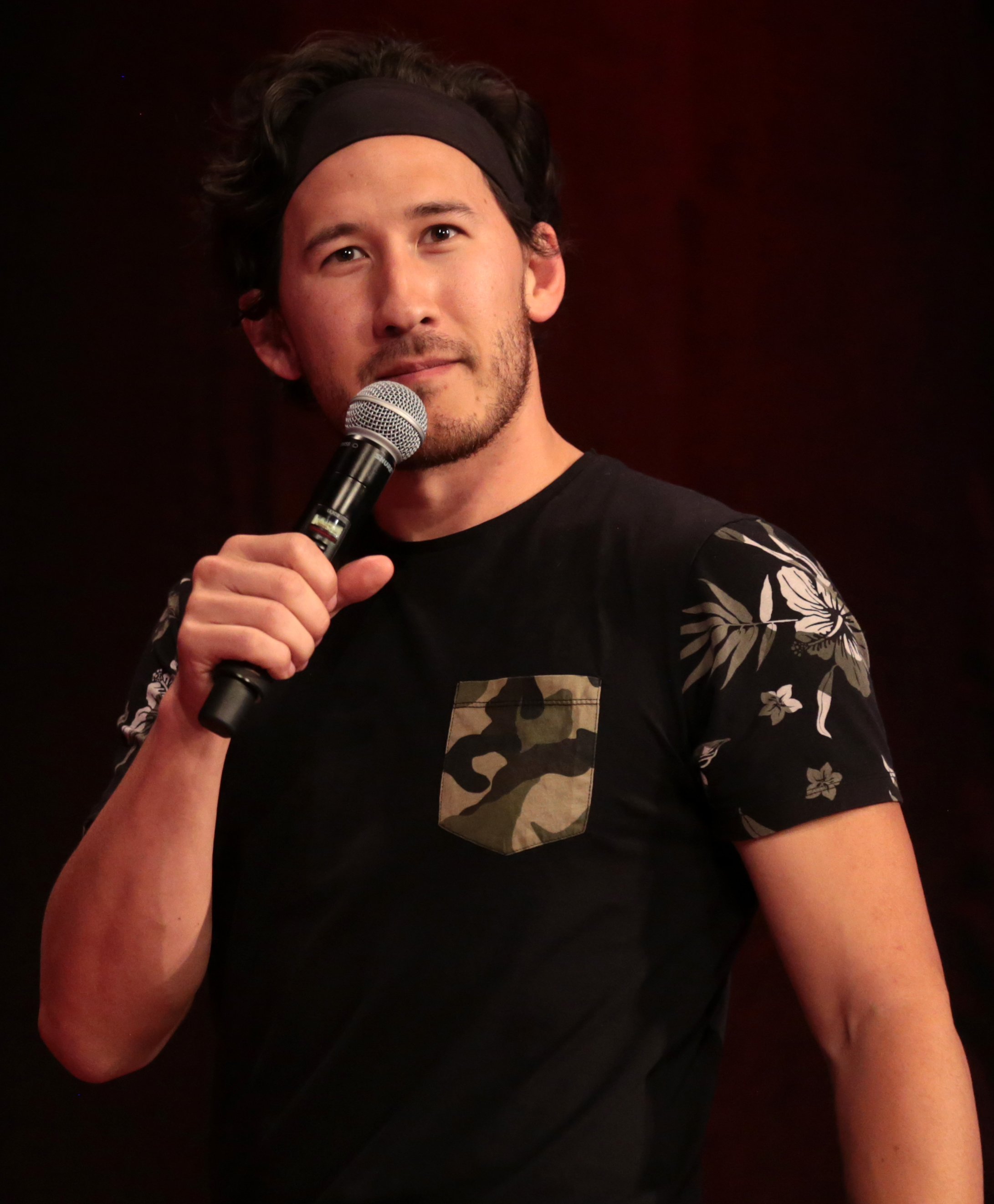
Fischbach in 2018

His YouTube channel reached 20 million subscribers in March, before going on another hiatus in June to mourn his step-niece Miranda Cracraft, who had been killed in a car accident at the age of nineteen, raising over $79,000 for her funeral through GoFundMe.

In October 2019, an interactive special, A Heist with Markiplier, was released as his first YouTube Original. Produced by Fischbach and Rooster Teeth, the special follows two burglars—the viewer and Fischbach—and contains 31 possible endings. Fischbach had released a similar project titled A Date with Markiplier in 2017.

On November 15, 2019, Fischbach launched a new channel with fellow YouTuber Ethan Nestor (formerly known online as CrankGameplays) called Unus Annus (Latin for "one year"), a channel that planned to upload a video every day for one year, after which the channel would be deleted along with its videos. The channel rose to early success, gaining 1 million subscribers in its first five days and 4.56 million in its last few minutes, and over 11.5 million video views in its first week. Following a final 12-hour live stream that peaked at over 1.5 million concurrent viewers, the channel was deleted by Fischbach and Nestor on November 14, 2020, at 12:00 a.m. PST.

=== Film, television and podcasts ===
Since 2017, Fischbach has voiced the character 5.0.5 in the Cartoon Network series Villainous. Fischbach starred and co-produced a podcast drama called The Edge of Sleep, which follows a night watchman who discovers that everyone who fell asleep the previous night died and must try to stay awake. The first project from QCode's Wood Elf label, (Note: While considered a podcast label under QCode, Nicholas Quah of Vulture described Wood Elf as an "audio company formed by a group of digital creators" including Fischbach, Matthew Patrick and Rhett & Link.) The Edge of Sleep, debuted September 2019, and was renewed for a second season set for 2023. Fischbach reprises his role in a television remake produced by New Regency, in which Lio Tipton and Eve Harlow also star. It was released in 2024 and debuted in Amazon Prime Video's Top 10 charts.

Fischbach, alongside Barnes and Muyskens, hosts the podcast Distractible. Also produced by Wood Elf, it rose to No. 1 on Spotify and Apple Podcasts' charts when it was launched in May 2021. Fischbach and Scheid also launched Go! My Favorite Sports Team in February 2022, a comedy podcast where the enthusiast Scheid and the unknowledgeable Fischbach discuss sports.

The two-part In Space with Markiplier (2022) was again produced by Fischbach and Rooster Teeth as his second interactive YouTube Original. The viewer takes on the role of the captain of a collapsing spaceship, with Fischbach playing its head engineer. In Space was nominated for Outstanding Interactive Media at the first ceremony of the Children's and Family Emmys Awards.

Deadline announced at the start of March 2023 that Fischbach had signed with United Talent Agency (UTA). A week later, it was announced at Spotify Stream On that Spotify would exclusively host new video episodes of Distractible and Go! My Favorite Sports Team. Fischbach also said he was working on an upcoming film. On April 21, Deadline announced that Fischbach had begun production on a film adaptation of the 2022 indie horror game Iron Lung by David Szymanski. Fischbach directed, produced, wrote, and financed Iron Lung himself. The film stars him and Caroline Rose Kaplan and was released on January 30, 2026. It grossed $13 million in its opening week at the US box office.

== Other ventures ==
=== Activism and philanthropy ===
Fischbach has participated in multiple charity live streams and fundraisers. The majority of his fundraising has been for cancer charities in honor of his father, who died of lung cancer in 2008. In 2017, Forbes reported that Fischbach and his fans raised around $3 million for charity through these events. In March 2018, in celebration of reaching 20 million subscribers, Fischbach announced he would donate all proceeds from a 48-hour sale of his "Tasteful Nudes" Charity Calendar to the Cancer Research Institute; he raised over $490,000 for the charity and won the 2020 Oliver R. Grace Award.

=== Business ===
Fischbach joined the board of comic book publisher Red Giant Entertainment in November 2014. In June of that year at San Diego Comic-Con, he co-hosted a panel with figures from the company, including CEO Benny R. Powell, and writers David Campiti, Mort Castle, David Lawrence, and Brian Augustyn. In 2016, it was announced that he would appear in his own line of comics.

In October 2018, Fischbach and fellow YouTuber Seán McLoughlin launched the clothing line Cloak, aimed at the gaming community. Streamer Imane Anys joined Cloak as a partner and creative director in 2020.

In August 2026, Fischbach filed a declaration with the Securities Exchange Commission that he bought approximately US$ 9.3 million worth of shares of GoPro, approximately 8.5% of the available shares, making him the largest individual shareholder. Fischbach professed support for the company's products.

=== OnlyFans ===
The success of the Tasteful Nudes Calendar inspired Fischbach to start an account on OnlyFans, whose proceeds would be split evenly between the Cincinnati Children's Hospital and the World Food Programme. He announced a set of conditions that had to be met first before launching the page: The first condition was that the Distractible podcast had to become the most popular podcast on Apple Podcast and Spotify, and the second condition was that the Go! My Favorite Sports Team podcast, which he created with Scheid, had to become the most popular sports podcast in the United States and the rest of the world. The third and final condition was that fans had to pay an admission fee of $12 for his documentary Markiplier From North Korea, a documentary based on his mother's life story about him getting back in touch with the rest of his family.

The conditions were met faster than he was prepared for. On November 2, 2022, he announced in a YouTube video that he was going to create the page at the end of the month, after making an initial batch of "tasteful nudes" and obtaining the "Markiplier" handle from an impersonator. The page was launched on December 9, 2022, and the influx of traffic caused the site to crash.

== Artistry ==
=== Content ===
Fischbach is best known for his Let's Plays of indie horror games. He uploaded his first Let's Play of the 2014 survival horror game Five Nights at Freddy's (FNaF) on August 13, 2014. As of February 2026, the video has over 127 million views, making it his most viewed Let's Play. The game was released just five days prior to Fischbach's video and quickly saw viral success after Fischbach and other YouTubers made videos playing it. Viewers were drawn by the hilarity of their "over-the-top" reactions. Fischbach's videos included his struggles to beat the game's hardest mode and decipher the complicated hidden story, which the resulting franchise is now known for. For over a decade, Fischbach has consistently made Let's Plays of every entry in the FNaF series. They are some of his most viewed and rewatched videos. He is highly engaged with the franchise's fandom, which has an overlap with his own. Fischbach is sometimes referred to as the "King of FNaF", due to his accomplishments in the games.

He made a guest appearance in the launch trailer for Five Nights at Freddy's AR: Special Delivery (2019). In 2023, /Film's B. J. Colangelo wrote that Fischbach was the main contributor to FNaF's rise to popularity. Fischbach confirmed he was asked to appear in the 2023 film adaptation of the video game but was unable to do so due to scheduling conflicts with his Iron Lung adaptation. In one of MatPat's Film Theory videos, it was confirmed that Fischbach was supposed to play the night security guard that was killed by the animatronics in the film's opening scene.

=== Collaborations ===
Fischbach has collaborated on sketch comedy and gaming videos with a number of fellow YouTubers, including Ethan Nestor, Jacksepticeye, LordMinion777, Muyskerm, PewDiePie, Matthias, Game Grumps, Cyndago, Yamimash, jacksfilms, CaptainSparklez, Egoraptor and LixianTV, the last of whom currently works as his editor. He has also collaborated with celebrities such as Jack Black and Jimmy Kimmel.

== Personal life ==
Fischbach says that he is "not religious" and does not attend church. His older brother, Tom, is a comic artist who created the long-running webcomic Twokinds. On September 20, 2025, Fischbach married his longtime girlfriend, Amy Nelson, after being together for ten years. In December 2025, Fischbach's mother, Sunok Frank, published a book about her family history titled Markiplier From North Korea. Fischbach and his wife have two dogs, Chica and Sandy.

== Filmography ==
=== Film ===
Year	Title	Director	Writer	Producer	Editor	Notes
2019	A Heist with Markiplier	Yes	Yes	No	No	Interactive film
2022	In Space with Markiplier	Yes	Yes	Executive	No	Interactive film
2026	Iron Lung	Yes	Yes	Executive	Yes	

==== Acting roles ====
Year	Title	Role	Notes	Ref.
2015	Smosh: The Movie	Himself	Cameo appearance	
2019	A Heist with Markiplier	Various	Interactive film	
2022	In Space with Markiplier	Various	Interactive film	
2022	Markiplier from North Korea	Himself	Documentary film	
2026	Iron Lung	Simon	Main role	

=== Television ===
Year	Title	Role	Notes	Ref.
2016	Gamer's Guide to Pretty Much Everything	Himself	Guest star	
2017–2021	Villainous	5.0.5 / Black Hot	Main role	
2024	The Edge of Sleep	Dave	Main role	

=== Web series ===
Year	Title	Role	Notes	Ref.
2014	Annoying Orange	Marc Marinara / Mini Shark	2 episodes	
2015–2018	YouTube Rewind	Himself	4 episodes	
2016	Scare PewDiePie	Himself	1 episode	
2017	Who Killed Markiplier?	Himself / Colonel / Mayor	4 episodes	

=== Music videos ===
Year	Artist	Title	Role
2014	Bart Baker	"Wiggle Parody"	Jeff Wiggle
2015	Ninja Sex Party	"Cool Patrol"	Cool Patrol Leader
2016	Ninja Sex Party	"6969"	Field reporter

=== Podcasts ===
Year	Title	Role	Notes	Ref.
2018–2021	3 Peens in a Pod	Himself		
2019–present	The Edge of Sleep	Dave	Co-producer; main role	
2021–present	Distractible	Himself		
2022–present	Go! My Favorite Sports Team	Himself		
2024–present	PowerWash Pals	Himself	Based on YouTube series	

=== Video games ===
Year	Title	Role	Ref.
2014	SpeedRunners	Himself	
2015	PewDiePie: Legend of the Brofist	Himself	
2020	AFK Arena	Himself	
2023	Dislyte	Himself	
2026	Mewgenics	Cats	

== Awards and nominations ==
Year	Nominated	Award	Result	Ref.
2015	The Game Awards	Trending Gamer	Nominated	
2015	Streamy Awards	Gamer	Nominated	
2016	Streamy Awards	Gamer	Nominated	
2016	Shorty Awards	Tech and Innovation: Gaming	Nominated	
2016	Make-A-Wish Foundation Award Ceremony	Celebrity of the Year	Won	
2017	Streamy Awards	Gamer	Nominated	
2017	Shorty Awards	Tech and Innovation: Gaming	Nominated	
2017	Golden Joystick Awards	Best Streamer/Broadcaster	Won	
2018	Kids' Choice Awards	Favorite Funny YouTube Creator	Nominated	
2018	Forbes 30 Under 30	Games	Included	
2020	Streamy Awards	Show of the Year (A Heist with Markiplier)	Nominated	
2020	Streamy Awards	Scripted Series (A Heist with Markiplier)	Won	
2020	Cancer Research Institute	Oliver R. Grace Award for Distinguished Service in Advancing Cancer Research	Won	
2021	Streamy Awards	Best Collaboration (with CrankGameplays for "Unus Annus")	Won	
2021	Streamy Awards	Gamer	Nominated	
2022	Streamy Awards	Show of the Year (In Space with Markiplier)	Nominated	
2022	Streamy Awards	Scripted Series (In Space with Markiplier)	Won	
2022	Streamy Awards	Gamer	Won	
2022	Children's and Family Emmy Awards	Outstanding Interactive Media (In Space With Markiplier)	Nominated	
2023	Streamy Awards	Gamer	Nominated	
2024	Kids' Choice Awards	Favorite Male Creator	Nominated	

== See also ==
- List of YouTubers
