= Nazneen Contractor =

Canadian actress (born 1982)

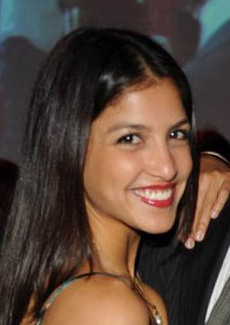
- Nazneen Contractor, 2009
- Born: 26 August 1982 (age 44); Mumbai, Maharashtra, India
- Occupation: Actress
- Years active: 2000–present
- Spouse: Carlo Rota (m. 2010)
- Children: 2

Nazneen Contractor (born August 26, 1982) is an Indian actress known for her role as Layla Hourani on CBC's The Border, Zara Hallam on Ransom and as Kayla Hassan on 24 in 2010. She also guest-starred in the Letterkenny International Women’s Day special as Professor Tricia. Since 2024, she has been recurring as District Attorney Justine Turner on General Hospital.

== Early life ==
Contractor was born in Bombay to Parsi parents. She and her family moved to Nigeria when she was 7 and finally settled in Toronto, where she spent the majority of her childhood and young adulthood.

== Personal life ==
After the Canadian drama series The Border finished production in 2009, she moved to Los Angeles and married British-born actor Carlo Rota on April 1, 2010. They have a son and a daughter.

== Relatives ==
Nazneen Contractor is a granddaughter of Meher Rustom Contractor (1918–1992), an Indian puppeteer and author.

Indian cinematographer, photographer, and author Navroze Contractor (1944–2023) was Nazneen's uncle.

== Filmography ==
=== Film ===
Year	Title	Role	Director(s)	Notes
2006	We R Friends	—N/a	Jaidev Chakraborty	Drama Film
2008	Thursday Market	Mariyah	—N/a	Short film
2011	Seance the Summoning	Eva	Alex Wright	Horror thriller film
2013	Star Trek Into Darkness	Rima Harewood	J.J. Abrams	Science fiction film
2013	Reel Life	Maddy	Laurence Relton	Short film
2014	Parts Per Billion	Justine Prest	Brian Horiuchi	Romantic film
2017	Roman J. Israel, Esq.	Melina Nassour (Ass't. D.A.)	Dan Gilroy	Crime drama film
2021	Trigger Point	Janice Carmichael	Brad Turner	Action thriller film
2021	Spiral	Chada	Darren Lynn Bousman	Horror thriller film

=== Television ===
Year	Title	Role	Notes
2000	Starhunter	Ire	Episode: "Siren's Song"
2001	Relic Hunter	Princess Alia	Episode: "The Star of Nadir"
2002	The Matthew Shepard Story	Shima	Made-for-TV movie directed by Roger Spottiswoode
2002–03	Street Time	Various	4 episodes
2006	The Papdits	Sita Papdit	Made-for-TV movie directed by Niall Downing
2008	Othello the Tragedy of the Moor	Bianca	Made-for-TV movie directed by Zaib Shaikh
2008–09	The Border	Layla Hourani	Main role
2010	Love Letters	Melissa	Made-for-TV movie directed by Tim Southam
2010	Rules of Engagement	Suneetha	4 episodes
2010	24	Kayla Hassan	Recurring role
2010	Lone Star	Sarah	Episode: "Pilot"
2011	The Paul Reiser Show	Kuma D'Bu	3 episodes
2012	Pegasus vs. Chimera	Princess Philony	Made-for-TV movie directed by John Bradshaw
2012	XIII: The Series	Elsy	Episode: "Battlezone"
2012	Last Resort	Reena Kapur	Episode: "Cinderella Liberty"
2013–14	Revenge	Jess	2 episodes
2014	Bones	Sari Nazeri	Episode: "The Source in the Sludge"
2014	Person of Interest	Maria Martinez	Episode: "Allegiance"
2014	Covert Affairs	Sydney/Stephanie	Recurring role
2015	Scorpion	Sima/Fatima	Episode: "Charades"
2015	Castle	Layla Nazif	Episode: "Private Eye Caramba!"
2015	Stalker	Adele Marshall	Episode: "The News"
2015	Dying Light	Jade (voice)	9 episodes
2015	Satisfaction	Guest	2 episodes
2015	The 46 Percenters	Kiri	Made-for-TV movie directed by Andy Ackerman
2015	Heroes Reborn	Farah	Recurring role
2016	The Carmichael Show	Fahmida	Episode: "New Neighbors"
2016	Chicago P.D.	Dawn Harper	Episode: "Justice"
2017	Tiny House of Terror	Jackie	Made-for-TV movie directed by Paul Shapiro
2017	Major Crimes	Nancy Ryan	Recurring role
2017	Starhunter Redux	Guest	Episode: "Siren's Song (Redux)"
2017–18	Stretch Armstrong and the Flex Fighters	Riya Dashti/Blindstrike, various others (voice)	Main role
2017–19	Ransom	Zara Hallam	Main role
2018	Hawaii Five-0	Emma Warren	Episode "Aia i Hi'ikua; i Hi'ialo"
2018–20	Star Wars Resistance	Synara San (voice)	Recurring role
2019	Law & Order: Special Victims Unit	Nahla Nasar	Episode: "Assumption"
2019	Mickey Mouse Mixed-Up Adventures	Daavan Dut (voice)	Episode: "A Gollywood Wedding"
2019–20	The Loud House	Ruby (voice)	2 episodes
2020	The Christmas Ring	Kendra Adams	Made-for-TV Movie directed by Troy Scott
2020	The Expanse	Ashanti Avasarala	Episode: "Churn"
2021	A Winter Getaway	Courtney	Made-for-TV Movie directed by Steven R. Monroe
2021	Stillwater	Queen Tortoise/Hedgehog Guest 1	Episode: "The Unexpected Gift/Celebration Song"
2022	The Perfect Pairing	Cristina	Made-for-TV Movie directed by Don McBrearty
2022	FreakAngels	Sirkka	9 episodes
2022	Letterkenny	Professor Tricia	Episode: "Letterkenny Celebrates International Women's Day"
2022	Charmed	Inara	3 episodes
2022	Scentsational Christmas	Ellie	Made-for-TV Movie directed by Robert Vaughn
2022–25	Children Ruin Everything	Dawn	Regular supporting role
2024	Love on the Danube: Love Song	Sarah Matthews	Made-for-TV movie directed by Terry Ingram
2024	Holidazed	Stacey	Miniseries
2024–Present	General Hospital	Justine Turner	Recurring Role
2025	The Love Club	Nila	4 episodes
2025	Criminal Minds	Michelle	Episode: "Tara"
2025	Heartland	Taya Miller	Episode: "Suspicious Minds"
2025	NCIS	FBI Senior Agent Beth Rollins	Episode: "Gone Girls"
2025	Boston Blue	District Attorney, Nadra Ali	Episode: "Collateral Damage"

=== Podcast ===
Year	Title	Role	Notes
2024	The Seneschal	Guest	Voice

=== Video games ===
Year	Title	Role	Notes
2015	Dying Light	Jade / various others (voice)	
2023	Diablo IV	Lord of Hatred DLC (voice)	
2023	MythForce	Maggie	
