= Ransom (TV series) =

2017 crime drama television series

- Genre: Crime; Suspense drama
- Created by: David Vainola; Frank Spotnitz
- Starring: Luke Roberts; Nazneen Contractor; Brandon Jay McLaren; Sarah Greene; Karen LeBlanc
- Composer: Guillaume Roussel
- Countries of origin: Canada; France; United States; Germany
- Original language: English
- No. of seasons: 3
- No. of episodes: 39

Production
- Executive producers: Frank Spotnitz; David Vainola; Jennifer Kawaja; Julia Sereny; Valerie Pechels; Odile McDonald
- Production location: Toronto
- Production companies: Entertainment One; Big Light Productions; Sienna Films; Wildcats Productions; Corus Entertainment

Original release
- Network: Global (Canada); TF1 (France); CBS (United States); VOX (Germany)
- Release: January 1, 2017 – May 25, 2019

Ransom is an internationally co-produced drama television series created by David Vainola and directed by Frank Spotnitz, starring Luke Roberts, that began airing on CBS. Ordered straight-to-series with 13 episodes on June 6, 2016, the series is a co-production between Canada's Global, France's TF1, the United States' CBS, and Germany's RTL, while the latter is airing the series on its sister network VOX. The series premiered on Global and CBS on January 1, 2017.

On May 17, 2017, CBS announced that Ransom was cancelled in the United States. A day later, RTLGroup also reported that they left the project after low ratings in Germany. It was reported on the same day that the other broadcasters behind the series were attempting to fund a second season. In late June, various sources reported that Global and TF1 ordered a second season, to be produced without the former partners. Production was set to start in late July 2017. On October 10, 2017, CBS and Global officially announced that Ransom had been renewed for a 13-episode second season, which premiered on April 7, 2018, on CBS in the United States. On July 16, 2018, CBS and Global announced that the series has been renewed for a 13-episode third season, which premiered on February 16, 2019.

On July 3, 2019, CBS announced that the series had been cancelled after three seasons.

Ransom was the first newly American scripted series that debuted on its Saturday night schedule since The District was cancelled in 2004.

== Premise ==
The series follows Eric Beaumont, an experienced crisis and hostage negotiator, and his team, who solve kidnap and ransom cases involving the most dangerous criminals in the world.

The series is inspired by the real life negotiators Laurent Combalbert and Marwan Mery.

== Cast ==
=== Main ===
- Luke Roberts as Eric Beaumont, an experienced crisis and hostage negotiator. He grew up in Chicago, where his mother, a surgeon, still lives.
- Nazneen Contractor as Zara Hallam, the team's lead investigator
- Brandon Jay McLaren as Oliver Yates, a psychological profiler
- Sarah Greene as Maxine Carlson (season 1–2), a crisis and hostage negotiator who acts as Beaumont's second. She takes leave from the team during the second season after being forced to use lethal force against a perpetrator to save Oliver.
- Karen LeBlanc as Cynthia Walker (season 2–3), a crisis and hostage negotiator who works with Eric on a case during the second season, and eventually joins the team as Maxine's replacement as Beaumont's new second-in-command.

=== Recurring ===
- Emma de Caunes as Nathalie Denard, Eric's ex-wife and the CEO of an insurance company
- Carlo Rota as Damian Delaine, an enemy from Eric Beaumont's past
- Natalie Brown as Kate Barrett (season 3), an FBI agent and Eric's girlfriend
- Emmanuel Kabongo as Tyler LeFebure (season 3)

== Filming ==
The first season was filmed in Toronto, Canada and Nice, France. Toronto stood in for locations in North America. Eight episodes were shot in Toronto and five were shot in Nice.

The second season began shooting in Toronto and Budapest, Hungary in November 2017, with production expected to finish in May 2018.

The third season was filmed in Budapest, Hungary.

== Episodes ==
Season	Episodes	Originally released	
Season	Episodes	First released	Last released
1	13	December 25, 2016 (Canadian online preview); January 1, 2017 (premiere)	April 15, 2017
2	13	April 7, 2018	June 30, 2018
3	13	February 16, 2019	May 25, 2019

=== Season 1 (2017) ===
No. overall	No. in season	Title	Directed by	Written by	Original release date	Prod. code	US viewers (millions)
1	1	"The Return"	Richard Lewis	Story by : David Vainola & Frank Spotnitz; Teleplay by : David Vainola	December 25, 2016 (Canadian online preview); January 1, 2017 (premiere)	RAN101	6.652 (US); 1.001 (CA)
Eric is asked to use his insight to resolve a difficult kidnap and ransom case, and save lives; new team member Maxine Carlson is eager to prove herself, but her dangerous secret from the past lurks.
2	2	"Grand Slam"	Jon Jones	Sara B. Cooper	January 7, 2017	RAN103	3.282 (US); 0.95 (CA)
When up-and-coming baseball player Jaquan is diagnosed with a rare form of leukemia, he is desperate to find a bone marrow donor. However, when a match is found, it comes with a ransom demand of $6 million. Eric and the team are called in to negotiate, but negotiations are made difficult when it turns out that the donor match is one of Jaquan's fans and her sister, who was kidnapped by the mother to a young boy with a rare disease. She demands the money which she plans to use for her son's treatment, not caring about anyone else but her sick son.
3	3	"The Box"	Érik Canuel	Ben Harris	January 21, 2017	RAN102	3.605 (US)
When two bank robbers walk into a bank and take everyone inside hostage, Eric and his team race to figure out how to negotiate with bank robbers who won't make any demands, before one of the hostages bleeds to death. Their job is complicated when the bank robbers demand the names of the owners of the bank's safety deposit boxes, and all the evidence seems to point to some sort of conspiracy revolving around the crime that one of the bank robbers went to prison for.
4	4	"Joe"	James Genn	Sarah Dodd	January 28, 2017	RAN107	3.28 (US); 0.944 (CA)
An engineer working for a company that manufactures collision avoidance software for cars is kidnapped.
5	5	"The Enemy Within"	Eleanore Lindo	Ben Schiffer	February 4, 2017	RAN111	3.29 (US)
Eric is brought in by his old boss from the FBI to negotiate with an extremist from a racist group threatening to set off bombs all over New York.
6	6	"Celina"	François Velle	Ben Schiffer	February 11, 2017	RAN106	3.204 (US)
A French couple hire the team to rescue their kidnapped surrogate baby that has a dangerous medical condition.
7	7	"Regeneration"	James Genn	David Vainola	February 18, 2017	RAN109	3.141 (US)
Maxine has her first negotiation when Eric and other guests at a retreat are taken hostage by the leader of a fanatical militia group.
8	8	"Say What You Did"	Paul A. Kaufman	David Vainola	February 25, 2017	RAN104	3.899 (US)
The daughter of a high ranking government official, and member of a persecuted minority in her home country, is kidnapped and ransomed, but not for money, rather something much more personal. Eric and the team are tasked with getting her back, but they need to work out who is really in the wrong here. Eric's daughter goes awry.
9	9	"Girl on a Train"	Frédéric Forestier	Rachel Anthony	March 4, 2017	RAN108	3.108 (US); 0.926 (CA)
A couple in France turn to Eric and his team to rescue their daughter who was abducted from a train and may have been sold into human trafficking.
10	10	"The Artist"	Frédéric Forestier	Annmarie Morais	March 11, 2017	RAN105	2.724 (US)
Eric and the team begin negotiating the return of valuable paintings stolen from an art gallery, but the situation gets muddled when the thief then kidnaps a gallery staffer.
11	11	"The Castle"	François Velle	Sarah Dodd	March 25, 2017	RAN112	2.96 (US); 0.908 (CA)
Five teenagers are lured to a French castle while playing a smartphone game. The Ransom team must negotiate their release.
12	12	"Refuge"	Laurence Katrian	Mark Greig	April 8, 2017	RAN110	3.094 (US)
The team go from one job straight to another one when a family is kidnapped in Genova. However, Eric and the team become suspicious when they learn that the husband has been kidnapped before. As they race to save the couple and their daughter, the team learn something interesting about both the kidnappers and one of the victims.
13	13	"Bulletproof"	Laurence Katrian	Ben Harris	April 15, 2017	RAN113	2.698 (US)
Eric is forced to work with an old adversary to prevent a hacker from setting off explosions around the world if the NSA doesn't grant access to confidential files.

=== Season 2 (2018) ===
No. overall	No. in season	Title	Directed by	Written by	Original release date	Prod. code	US viewers (millions)
14	1	"Three Wishes"	James Genn	Frank Spotnitz	April 7, 2018	RAN201	2.644
After Eric's daughter is kidnapped, he must complete three ransom demands from his rival, Damien Delaine, to save his daughter's life.
15	2	"Alters"	James Genn	David Vainola	April 14, 2018	RAN203	2.548
Eric and Zara are drawn into a hostage crisis when they meet with the owner of a forensic accounting firm.
16	3	"Secrets and Spies"	Eleanor Lindo	Kyle Hart	April 21, 2018	RAN204	2.860
Eric and Oliver plunge into a world of espionage when a CIA spy disguised as an American diamond broker is kidnapped in Vienna; meanwhile Oliver gets an interesting job offer.
17	4	"A Free Man in Paris"	Eleanor Lindo	Sandra Chwialkowska	April 28, 2018	RAN202	2.503
When a former Guantanamo guard is taken hostage by terrorists, Eric is surprised when he learns that his best chance of saving the man’s life is to work with a former Guantanamo detainee who is now working with the captors.
18	5	"Undercover"	James Genn	Alison Lea Bingeman & Frank Spotnitz	May 5, 2018	RAN205	2.734
As Eric negotiates the release of an arms dealer's son from a kidnapper, he uncovers a larger plot to destroy hundreds of lives. Also, Zara is shaken when she must work with an abusive ex-colleague in order to prevent this terrorist attack.
19	6	"Legacy"	James Genn	Lynne Kamm	May 12, 2018	RAN206	2.407
Eric must rescue his mother after she is kidnapped by a criminal needing her services as a surgeon. Doing so forces Eric to reconcile with his estranged father, and figure out the intentions of the criminal's family.
20	7	"Anatomy of a Lost Cause"	Eleanor Lindo	Richard Zajdlic	May 26, 2018	RAN207	2.113
When a hostage is killed in the midst of a high-stakes negotiation, Eric is charged with aiding and abetting a kidnapper, and he faces self-doubt in the wake of his fatal error.
21	8	"The Fawn"	Eleanor Lindo	Steve Cochrane	June 2, 2018	RAN208	2.251
Eric tries to gain some insight from a convicted serial killer, on a new case. A copycat murderer begins to replicate their methods, causing concerns among investigators.
22	9	"Hardline"	Sturla Gunnarsson	Tamara Moulin	June 9, 2018	RAN209	2.253
Eric is tasked with attempting to have the daughter of a prominent politician freed. It could prove difficult, as the Dutch prime minister's daughter is famous for not paying ransoms.
23	10	"Radio Silence"	Sturla Gunnarsson	Avrum Jacobson & Vincent Shiao	June 16, 2018	RAN210	2.573
Eric has to negotiate with a suicidal co-pilot while on a plane with his daughter. Meanwhile, Oliver and Zara try to work things out from the ground.
24	11	"The Client"	Norma Bailey	Kyle Hart	June 23, 2018	RAN211	2.283
Eric works with the children of two hostages who were taken by a mob boss in order to keep them alive.
25	12	"Promised Land"	Bruce McDonald	Avrum Jacobson	June 30, 2018	RAN212	2.438
Eric negotiates with illegal immigrants who have taken a farmer hostage, but he discovers that the migrants took the farmer hostage so that they could pay a ransom to a more dangerous captor.
26	13	"Semaphore"	Bruce McDonald	David Vainola	June 30, 2018	RAN213	2.190
Eric's old enemy, Damien Delaine threatens to brainwash Evie and turn her into a killer. The only way Eric can stop Damian is by helping him destabilise the world economy.

=== Season 3 (2019) ===
No. overall	No. in season	Title	Directed by	Written by	Original release date	Prod. code	US viewers (millions)
27	1	"Justice"	James Genn	Frank Spotnitz	February 16, 2019	RAN301	2.167
Eric and the Crisis Resolution team are brought in to negotiate a blood money payoff when a man is murdered and the killer threatens to kill his wife, too.
28	2	"Black Dolphin"	James Genn	Sandra Chwialkowska	February 23, 2019	RAN302	2.716
The FBI asks Eric to convince the brainwashed survivor of an internet predator to reveal the identity of the person who incites vulnerable people to harm themselves.
29	3	"Indiscretion"	Eleanor Lindo	Kyle Hart	March 2, 2019	RAN303	2.732
The team search for a high-end escort, who is caught between a dangerous drug dealer and a vengeful cop with a vendetta. When the police find incriminating evidence, they think the situation is worse than they imagine.
30	4	"It's a Ravenzo"	Eleanor Lindo	Steve Cochrane	March 9, 2019	RAN304	2.480
Eric and the team enter the world of Italian fashion royalty when they are hired to negotiate the safe return of a world-famous designer's kidnapped wife.
31	5	"Life and Limb"	Charles Officer	Tamara Moulin	March 16, 2019	RAN305	1.874
When a kidnapper from a past case returns and threatens to harm a child, the team is forced to confront the consequences of Eric's policy of letting perpetrators go free.
32	6	"Stay of Execution"	Charles Officer	Joseph Kay	March 30, 2019	RAN306	2.097
When a death row inmate gets a `ransom' letter offering him exonerating evidence for $500,000, the team has 48 hours to verify that the information is real.
33	7	"Prima"	Paul Fox	Aisha Porter-Christie	April 13, 2019	RAN307	2.969
When a Russian Prima ballerina and her rival are kidnapped, the team navigate the competitive world of ballet in order to find the women and return them to safety.
34	8	"Dark Triad"	Paul Fox	Sandra Chwialkowska	April 20, 2019	RAN308	2.245
The FBI brings in the Crisis Resolution team to negotiate with a formidable sociopath who is targeting diabetics and giving them tainted insulin.
35	9	"Broken Record"	Sturla Gunnarsson	Roslyn Muir & David Vainola	April 27, 2019	RAN309	2.795
When a disgraced negotiator impersonates Eric, the team races to recover a kidnapped hotel owner, the ransom money and Eric's tarnished reputation.
36	10	"Unfit"	Sturla Gunnarsson	Faisal Lutchmedial & Tamara Moulin	May 4, 2019	RAN310	2.113
A baby is stolen by a notorious serial kidnapper. The team must find out why the baby was targeted and locate him before it is too late and he is taken out of the country.
37	11	"Truth & Reconciliation"	Eleanor Lindo	Steve Cochrane	May 11, 2019	RAN311	2.037
When Eric and his new girlfriend, Kate, head to a gala at the American Embassy in Bogotá, they become embroiled in an assassination attempt, and Kate is the prime suspect.
38	12	"Playing God"	Eleanor Lindo	Kyle Hart	May 18, 2019	RAN312	2.244
The Crisis Resolution team is called in after a bombing at a genetics company makes a woman lose her memory. The team must figure out if she is a victim or the culprit.
39	13	"Story for Another Day"	April Mullen	David Vainola	May 25, 2019	RAN313	1.990
When Cynthia and her younger brother, Tyler, are abducted by a criminal Tyler is indebted to, Eric and the team are forced to break all the rules to find them.

== Home media ==
In Australia (Region 4), Via Vision Entertainment will release "The Complete Series" boxset on October 21, 2020.

== Reception ==
On Rotten Tomatoes season 1 has an approval rating of 47% based on reviews from 15 critics. The website's consensus states: "Ransom is a typical network procedural that lacks any originality or excitement."
