= Cathy Schulman =

American film producer (born 1965)

- Born: 1965 (age 60–61)
- Occupation: Film producer
- Years active: 2000–present

Cathy Schulman (born 1965) is an American film producer.

A graduate of Yale University, Schulman's screen credits include Isn't She Great, Sidewalks of New York, Employee of the Month, Crash, The Illusionist, Darfur Now and Dark Places. She was the executive producer of the Lifetime TV series Angela's Eyes, which went on to be distributed worldwide.

The film Crash earned Schulman a nomination for the BAFTA Award for Best Film. She won the Academy Award for Best Picture as well as the Independent Spirit Award for Best First Film for the movie. She is the CEO and President of Welle Entertainment, a development and production company committed to producing film, television, and media that appeals to diverse audiences, with an emphasis on women and girls.

== Filmography ==
She was a producer in all films unless otherwise noted.

=== Film ===
Year	Film	Credit
2000	Isn't She Great	Associate producer
2001	Sidewalks of New York	
2002	You Stupid Man	
2003	Tears of the Sun	Associate producer
2004	Employee of the Month	
2004	Godsend	
2004	Crash	
2005	Thumbsucker	Executive producer
2006	The Illusionist	
2011	Salvation Boulevard	
2013	Horns	
2014	The Voices	Executive producer
2014	When the Game Stands Tall	
2015	Dark Places	
2016	The Edge of Seventeen	Executive producer
2017	The Space Between Us	Executive producer
2017	The Foreigner	
2019	Five Feet Apart	
2019	Otherhood	
2022	The Woman King	
2022	Memory	
TBA	Machine Man	

Production manager

Year	Film	Role
2016	Bad Moms	Executive in charge of production

Thanks

Year	Film	Role
1996	Manny & Lo	Special thanks
1998	The Misadventures of Margaret	Thanks
2015	Parched	The producers wish to thank
2015	Hardcore Henry	Special thanks

=== Television ===
Year	Title	Credit	Notes
2006	Angela's Eyes	Executive producer	
2006	The Papdits	Executive producer	Television pilot
2022	The First Lady	Executive producer	
