= Trigger Point =

2021 Canadian film by Brad Turner

- Theatrical release poster
- Directed by: Brad Turner
- Written by: Michael Vickerman
- Produced by: Thomas Vencelides
- Starring: Barry Pepper; Eve Harlow; Carlo Rota; Laura Vandervoort; Jayne Eastwood; Nazneen Contractor; Greg Bryk; Rainbow Sun Francks; Colm Feore
- Cinematography: Brett Van Dyke
- Edited by: David Thompson
- Music by: Andrew Lockington; Michael White
- Production companies: High Park Entertainment; Landmark Studio Group; Peace River Pictures
- Distributed by: Screen Media Films
- Release dates: April 16, 2021 (United States and Canada); April 23, 2021 (VOD)
- Running time: 85 minutes
- Country: United States
- Language: English
- Box office: $29,262

Trigger Point is a 2021 American action-thriller film directed by Brad Turner. It stars Barry Pepper, Eve Harlow, Carlo Rota, Laura Vandervoort, Jayne Eastwood, Nazneen Contractor, Greg Bryk, Rainbow Sun Francks, and Colm Feore. The plot follows a retired special operative who returns to the organization to help his former boss find his missing daughter. Trigger Point was theatrically released by Screen Media Films on April 16, 2021. The film was met with negative reviews from critics.

== Plot ==
In New York, an assailant shoots and kills various people with a silencer.

One year later, retired United States special operative Nicolas Shaw lives a quiet life in hiding. In flashbacks, Shaw partially remembers being tortured by an unknown perpetrator who forced him to give out the names of his colleagues, who were shot by the assailant, before being framed for the assassinations. After being confronted by a member of the agency he was once a part of, Shaw meets with Elias Kane, his former boss, who tells him that his daughter, Monica, has been kidnapped by a perpetrator named Quinton.

While investigating, Shaw manages to rescue Monica after escaping a shootout with the guards. However, Shaw is soon held at gunpoint by Monica, who reveals she and her father were trying to capture Shaw to retrieve encrypted information. After taking away her firearm, Shaw takes Monica into a forest, where it is revealed that she has been shot. At a house, Shaw tells Monica that Quinton was the unknown perpetrator who made him give out the identities of his colleagues by drugging him; Monica tells Shaw that, in fact, he gave out the names before he was tortured and that the drug caused him to forget the events. Soon after, Monica escapes and reunites with her father, where the pair learn Shaw erased the encrypted information.

Back in the town where he was living in hiding, Shaw begins to decode a copy of the information. Meanwhile, Kane begins to track Shaw by visiting the diner and bookstore Shaw frequently visited, where he meets Janice, the waitress Shaw flirted with, and shoots the bookstore owner who knows about Shaw's true identity. After decoding the information, Shaw learns it was Kane who tortured him, drugging him to forget his memories but failing to retrieve Quinton's information.

Kane takes Janice hostage and Monica is told by Shaw about her father's true intentions. Finding Janice in Kane's car, Shaw begins to track down Kane. In a shootout, the pair are led to a pier, where Monica arrives, having learned that Kane was the one who caused the death of her lover Javier, and Shaw shoots and kills Kane before Monica does.

Days later, at a school, Shaw meets with a teacher who was also one of his former colleagues. As she reveals that she knew about Kane's plan all along, the pair discuss the possibility of a larger conspiracy before Shaw pulls out a gun. Outside, the bookstore owner and Shaw speak on the phone before Shaw tells her that he will leave town for a "few business days".

== Cast ==
- Barry Pepper as Nicolas Shaw
- Colm Feore as Elias Kane
- Eve Harlow as Monica Kane
- Carlo Rota as Dwight Logan
- Laura Vandervoort as Fiona Snow
- Jayne Eastwood as Irene Cole
- Nazneen Contractor as Janice Carmichael
- Greg Bryk as Richard Pool
- Rainbow Sun Francks as "Mouthpiece"
- Karen Robinson as Quinton

== Production ==
Trigger Point was originally going to begin production in early 2020, but filming was put on hold due to the COVID-19 pandemic. On October 13, 2020, it was announced that Barry Pepper and Colm Feore had joined the cast of the film. Principal photography began on October 26, 2020, in the midst of the pandemic, and concluded on December 6 after filming in Huron County, Hamilton, and Bayfield, Ontario. The film is the first major motion picture to be shot in Bayfield.

== Reception ==
=== Box office ===
In its opening weekend, the film earned $29,262 from 77 theaters.

=== Critical response ===
On the review aggregator website Rotten Tomatoes, 33% of 15 reviews are positive, with an average rating of 4.6/10. Glenn Kenny, writing for RogerEbert.com, gave the film half a star out of four. In his review, Kenny criticized the film's title, its overuse of exposition to explain plot points, and the "nurturing [of] some deeply-held racial and sexist resentments" from the screenwriter, referring to the film itself as a "cinematic bag of pain". In their mixed review for MovieWeb, Julian Roman noted the "brisk pacing and sharp violence" in the film and its "somewhat cinematic flow", but also mentioned his disappointment in the low runtime. From Comic Book Resources, Cynthia Vinney had a similar assessment and gave negative remarks to its length and acting, but said the overall story had "enough action to be diverting".

== Possible sequels ==
Director Brad Turner told the Clinton News-Record that Trigger Point could potentially serve as the first film in a trilogy: "It was written as a beginning of a series of movies and so far the concept is for two more, but it could easily go on for a few more depending on the success of it." On CTV News, executive producer Eric Birnberg said, that the trilogy could be similar to the John Wick franchise with the use of "common elements".
