= David Vainola =

Canadian television and film writer and producer

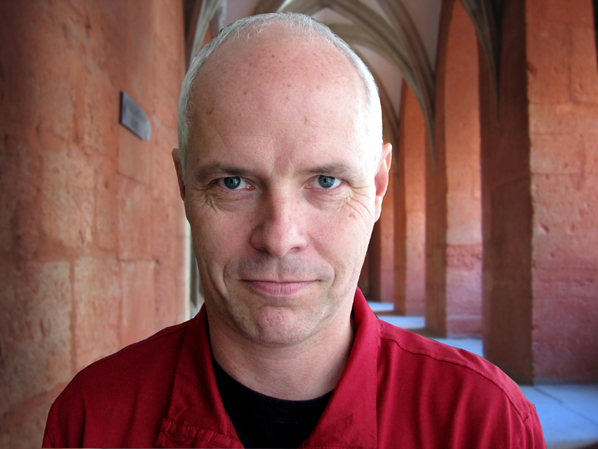
David J. Vainola

David J. Vainola (born 5 October 1961) is a Canadian television and film writer and producer.

== Early life ==
Vainola was born in Leicester, United Kingdom, and became a Canadian citizen in 1967.

== Career ==
For the National Film Board of Canada, Vainola directed the short dramatic film "The Drive Away" in 1989. He directed the short film "The Other Prison" (1990), which won a Silver Plaque at the Chicago Film Festival and a Reel Award (Ottawa).

Vainola directed the short film "Curiosities" in 1995. "Curiosities" was nominated for two Gemini Awards, including best short program, and won the Best Canadian Film award at the Toronto Worldwide Film Short Festival in 1996.

Vainola wrote and directed the one-hour documentary 30 Second Democracy in 1997. The film has been nationally broadcast in more than a dozen countries, including Canada.

In 2008, Vainola wrote the TV mini-series Diamonds (aired May 2009). Diamonds aired around the world, including a prime-time broadcast on ABC Television in 2008, and received 12 Gemini Award nominations. At the 24th Gemini Awards in 2009, Vainola was nominated for Best Writing in a Dramatic Program or Mini-Series for his work on Diamonds.

Vainola was a story consultant on Season 1 of the award-winning Cardinal (first aired January 2017), and was a consulting producer for Combat Hospital.

Vainola created, with Frank Spotnitz, the television show Ransom. He is an executive producer on the show, which is inspired by the real-life negotiators Laurent Combalbert and Marwan Mery. Combalbert and Mery have also provided commentary on episodes of Season 1 of Ransom, available on YouTube. Season 1 of Ransom aired December 2016; Season 2 aired April 7, 2018. On July 16, 2018, CBS and Global announced that the series has been renewed for a 13-episode third season, which premiered February 16, 2019.

== Selected filmography ==
- "The Other Prison" (1990)
- 30 Second Democracy (1997)
- Diamonds (2009)
- Combat Hospital (2011)
- Cardinal (2017)
- Ransom (2017-2019)
