= The Edge of Sleep (TV series) =

American television series

- A poster showcasing the initial release date
- Genre: Apocalyptic; Psychological horror; Mystery
- Based on: The Edge of Sleep by Jake Emanuel and Willie Block
- Written by: Jake Emanuel; Willie Block
- Directed by: Corey Adams
- Starring: Markiplier; Lio Tipton; Franz Drameh; Eve Harlow; Carlo Rota
- Music by: Jeremy Wallace Maclean
- Original language: English
- No. of episodes: 6

Production
- Executive producers: Mark Fischbach; Corey Adams; Jake Emanuel; Willie Block; Arnon Milchan; Yariv Milchan; Michael Schaefer; Fred Berger; Justin Levy; Ben Curtis; Aaron Ginsburg; Robert Herting; Dave Henning; Brian Kavanaugh-Jones; Chris Ferguson
- Producer: Jesse Savath
- Production locations: Vancouver, BC, Canada
- Cinematography: Jeremy Cox
- Editor: Graham Fortin
- Running time: 20-25 minutes
- Production companies: Regency Enterprises; QCode; Oddfellows; Automatik

Original release
- Network: Amazon Prime Video
- Release: October 15, 2024

The Edge of Sleep is an American psychological horror television miniseries written by Jake Emanuel and Willie Block and directed by Corey Adams, based on the podcast and novel of the same name. Consisting of six episodes, it premiered on October 15, 2024, on Amazon Prime Video, and moved to Tubi on May 15, 2025.

== Premise ==
Dave Torres, a night watchman, finishes his shift and is horrified to discover that everyone who went to sleep the previous night has died of unknown causes. He must navigate the troubling hallucinations he has had since childhood in order to solve the mystery and figure out what happened to them.

== Cast and characters ==
=== Main ===
- Markiplier as Dave Torres, a night security guard who has experienced night terrors and hallucinations as a product of parasomnia since his childhood.
  - Connor Kendall plays a young Dave in flashbacks.
- Lio Tipton as Katie Dowd, Dave's ex-girlfriend and a recovering drug addict.
- Franz Drameh as Matteo León, Dave's coworker and fellow security guard, as well as a United States Air Force veteran.
- Eve Harlow as Linda Russo, a nurse at Santa Mira hospital. She is also a former employee of the pharmaceutical company Cynagen.

=== Recurring ===
- Lisa Durupt as Tracey Torres, Dave's mother, who is featured repeatedly in flashbacks showing her attempts to get Dave's sleep trauma diagnosed professionally.
- Carlo Rota as Dr. Luis Castaneda, a somnologist who specializes in dream studies. He is featured in flashbacks treating Dave Torres as a child.
- Luis Javier as Safet, the leader of the enigmatic "Dream People" that Dave has visions of.
- Patti Allan as Ruth Nelson, an elderly patient with terminal cancer at Santa Mira hospital.
- Marci T. House as Britney Woods, a fellow nurse at Santa Mira Hospital.

=== Guests ===
- Trezzo Mahoro as Connor, an acquaintance of Dave's who attends a party the night of the mass nocturnal death.
- Braden Overwater as Gus, Connor's friend.
- Danny Dworkis as Dr. Jack Gordon, a doctor at Santa Mira Hospital.
- Zinaid Memišević as Vadim. Memišević passed away before the series aired.

== Development ==
=== Background ===
The Edge of Sleep originated as a podcast produced by QCode and written by Jake Emanuel and Willie Block. It aired in 2019 and featured Mark Fischbach as the main character, Dave Torres.

=== Production ===
In 2021, QCode made an agreement with New Regency to adapt The Edge of Sleep into a television series, with Fischbach reprising his original role. The show was filmed in Vancouver and Kamloops in 2021 over the span of a month, although talk of its release would not be reported until 2023 by Deadline Hollywood. The series was shopped to numerous broadcasters and streaming platforms, all of which declined to pick it up until it was approved for release on Amazon Prime via Prime Video Direct.

== Release ==
On September 30, 2024, Fischbach announced on his YouTube channel in a video titled The Plan that the show would be released on October 18, 2024, although he could not reveal which streaming platform it would be available on. On October 15, 2024, the show was released early on Amazon Prime Video, while its marketing was still set to roll out on the 18th. Since its release, the series has broken into Prime Video's Top 10, and was hovering around No. 6 or 7 through the weekend of its release.

In late November, the show became unavailable on Prime Video. In April 2025, Fischbach announced that the series had been picked up by Tubi for streaming starting May 15 in the United States, Canada, the United Kingdom, and Australia.

== Episodes ==
No.	Title	Original release date	Prod. code
1	"The Whale"	October 15, 2024	TBA
Dave Torres (Mark Fischbach), a night security guard for Daxalab, wakes up from a disturbing hallucination of a whale at work. His best friend and coworker, Matteo (Franz Drameh), encourages him to ditch work to go to a party as a distraction from his recent breakup. Upon arrival at the party, Dave converses with Connor (Trezzo Mahoro), who makes several comments about Dave's diagnosed parasomnia, and insults his ex-girlfriend, Katie (Lio Tipton). Matteo begins a confrontation on Dave's behalf, and Connor pushes him onto the couch; a fellow party-goer, who had been sleeping, falls over as a result, and the four of them realize he is unresponsive. Connor and Gus (Braden Overwater) abandon the scene in order to avoid responsibility. After 911 does not answer, Dave tries to find his friend who hosted the party, and finds that the inhabitants of the house are all dead. Dave and Matteo drag the bodies into Matteo's car, thinking they were affected by a gas leak or laced drugs, and Dave frantically tries to contact Katie, in case she had taken any drugs at the party. They arrive at Santa Mira hospital; the two nurses who remained on shift, Linda (Eve Harlow) and Brit (Marci T. House), have dealt with multiple deaths, and the doctor on staff leaves, stating that both the CDC and FBI have failed to respond. As Dave and Matteo wait in the hospital lobby, Dave gets a strange hallucination of the animated pill in a drug advertisement telling him to wake up the woman and man who had been sitting near him; when he attempts to do so, he finds them both dead. Brit is found dead after lying down for a nap.
2	"The Elephant"	October 15, 2024	TBA
In a dream, a young Dave (Connor Kendall) experiences a terrifying hallucination of his mother removing her scalp, revealing a frightening elephant-like creature with a strange triangle marking on its head, as well as several alien beings standing around his bed. Adult Dave, seemingly before the events of the series, awakes from this apparent flashback in bed with Katie, who comforts him. In the present, Dave, Matteo, and Linda leave the hospital and drive to a police station, only to find that the entire town is silent, as everyone who had fallen asleep is dead. They make their way to the radio station to attempt a warning broadcast to those still alive; on the way, Dave attempts to contact Katie, who answers only to hang up on him. Dave leaves Linda and Matteo and runs to her home on foot, while they try to fix Matteo's car, which has inconveniently broken down. Dave reaches Katie, who initially doesn't believe him and thinks he is going through a hallucination. Linda and Matteo make it to the radio station and make a broadcast warning everyone to stay awake, which Katie hears and sways her to believe Dave; distraught, she tells him that she already took several sleeping pills.
3	"The Black Triangle"	October 15, 2024	TBA
The episode switches frequently between past and present. An advertisement rolls for the Castaneda Research Center's dream chamber, an invention which allows them to study a subject's temporal lobe. A flashback reveals that Dave and Katie broke up due to Dave's involuntary self-harming during his hallucinations, which she found disturbing. The scene parallels to the present, where Katie is throwing up her sleep pills in the sink. Switching back to the past, a young Dave is taken to Dr. Luis Castaneda (Carlo Rota) by his mother Tracey (Lisa Durupt), who explains that he has had these dreams, and been hurting himself as a result of them, since he was extremely young. Castaneda assures her that he intends to figure out Dave's condition. Presently, Matteo, Linda, Dave, and Katie head back to Santa Mira hospital to see if any survivors made it there after the broadcast, but no one has shown up. They search the hospital and find that Ruth (Patti Allan), the terminally ill mother of one of Katie's friends, is still alive, due to the pain of her lymphoma preventing her from falling asleep. Back in the past, Castaneda interprets Dave's drawings of an elephant-like monster and humanoid figures who Tracey refers to as "the dream people." Linda gives everyone Modafalyst, a stimulant drug designed to keep them awake, and coincidentally the same drug that Dave hallucinated was telling him to wake up the woman and man in the hospital lobby. She also decides that she is going to start testing the bodies of the deceased to figure out what's causing the deaths. Upon dissecting a deceased person's skull, they find a burning hot mark branded onto his brain in the shape of a black triangle, identical to the one on the elephant monster in Dave's dreams.
4	"The Dream People"	October 15, 2024	TBA
Dave recognizes the triangle symbol from his dreams. The crew grow more irritated the longer they are kept awake, which doesn't help with their tolerance for each other. Linda tells Matteo about her job at Cynagen, and reveals that she lost both the job and her license after whistleblowing about some unethical experimentations and drugs. Katie comforts Ruth, who has not been told that her daughter is most likely dead, before going to speak with Dave, who has been getting increasingly erratic visions. In the past, young Dave does a sleep study in the dream chamber, with Castaneda guiding him through his usual dreams. However, Dave encounters the elephant, which sends him into a state of terror and triggers an emergency alert on the machine, as the elephant chases him. When Castaneda grabs Dave to pull him out of the chamber, Dave hallucinates him as the elephant, and uses a pen to stab him in the neck before waking up. Upon waking, he sees Castaneda bleed out. In the present, Dave confides in Katie about his dreams, before Matteo runs in to tell them that Linda has taken Ruth downstairs to the MRI machine. Linda tells them that she informed Ruth of the situation, and Ruth consented to have her brain scanned as she fell asleep for the last time. Katie protests, but Linda proceeds with the scan. She discovers that Ruth died during a flurry of brain activity, meaning she died while dreaming. Dave proposes that they let him fall asleep but wake him up before the three minute mark, which is when Ruth died. The others are opposed until Dave reveals that he had scarred himself while hallucinating weeks prior with the same triangle that was burned into the dead man's brain.
5	"The Nightmare"	October 15, 2024	TBA
Dave dreams that he is chained to a spike in the ground just out of reach of a lake. A voice repeatedly tells him to drink water, which Dave is too far from the lake to do. After repeatedly trying to free himself and failing, a car drives over the hill towards him. Tracey steps out and offers him a glass of liquid, but before he can drink, one of the "dream people" appears and forces her back to the car. He tells Dave to look inside the glass, and he sees a murky liquid with a reflection of an eye and a triangle inside it. He tells Dave that they have met before, and Dave must go to Aristera to find them before it is too late. Tracey suddenly turns into the elephant right before Dave is woken up by the crew. He explains that they need to go to Aristera, which turns out to be a remote island. After some convincing, they agree, and they pack up some hospital supplies before heading out to the airport hangar. On the way, Katie falls asleep and needs to be revived with a drug; Linda voices her concerns privately to Dave that Katie can't hold out much longer. Matteo figures out how to fly the private plane in the hangar, and they begin their flight. Katie falls asleep mid-flight and despite Linda's efforts, she does not wake up.
6	"The Dream Warrior"	October 15, 2024	TBA
On the plane, Matteo struggles to stay awake. Dave hallucinates before being shaken back to reality by Linda, who is trying to keep both men awake. Matteo realizes that they will have to land on the water since the island does not have a runway, and they make a tumultuous crash landing into the ocean. All three manage to get to shore, where Safet (Luis Javier), the dream person Dave spoke to, guides Dave to the rocky cliffs he saw in his dream. The crew experience severe mental disturbances in loud flashes, and have a hallucination of the elephant holding a funeral for Katie. Dave manages to shut the casket holding Katie's body; once he does, the three of them wake up together just outside the rocky outcropping. Suddenly, a voice calls out to them, and a man (Zinaid Memišević) walks towards them. He takes them to a small village of many different people with different ethnicities, saying they were all told in a dream to come to the island. He tells them that the elephant monster is the Beast, and he takes different forms for each person. He takes them to Safet, who explains to Dave that the whale he hallucinated in the sky is real; they guard the world from the Beast, and guide people like Dave to their order so that they will be ready to fight the Beast in the coming war. Dave, Linda, and Matteo go to sleep peacefully on the island. Meanwhile, people all over the world who had been killed by the phenomenon begin waking up with the triangle mark in their eyes, including Katie, who is seen standing in the water off the shore of Aristera.
