= The Papdits =

The Papdits is a television show airing on CBS's InnerTube service, premiering in 2007, satirizing a newly emigrated family from India. The show features a father, mother, daughter, son, and grandmother, and is written and produced by writers from Da Ali G Show.

== History ==
Ant Hines ("Da Ali G Show") was the writer and executive producer of The Papdits. Other executive producers included Sony and Bull's Eye Entertainment's Tom Nunan and Cathy Schulman ("Crash").

The series was born at Fox Broadcasting Company in late 2004 under the approval of Gail Berman. In November of that year, Fox gave The Papdits a six-episode commitment. The episodes were produced but never aired because the show's strongest supporter, Berman, left Fox for Paramount.

In May 2005, CBS decided to pick up The Papdits either for CBS or UPN. CBS eventually passed on the show, however, believing it to be too different for mainstream audiences.

The Papdits got one more chance a year later in 2006. On November 3, "Borat: Cultural Learnings of America for Make Benefit Glorious Nation of Kazakhstan" (co-written by Hines) premiered in the United States. Due to the success of Borat, CBS launched a 20-minute pilot of The Papdits on its Innertube broadband network.

== Story ==
A hybrid of mockumentary/reality television, The Papdits documents a Kashmiri family as a camera crew follows them as they travel across the United States, seeking a place to settle and trying to adapt to American culture. Gopi, the patriarch, has no doubt that the road along the way will be paved with gold, while his wife Ritsi tries to assimilate herself with the other American housewives.

The fictitious and clueless Papdits interact with "real" clueless Americans in true Borat style of trying to make everyone involved as uncomfortable as possible.

== Multi-Platform Television ==
The Papdits is an important example of the recent phenomenon of multi-platform television. CBS Paramount Network TV Entertainment Group president Nancy Tellem explained the significance of The Papdits as "It's the first time that, instead of just letting (a pilot die), we're putting something online with the intention that it could reside there and grow there." Although it was ready a few months prior, CBS waited until November to pair the online premiere up with the premiere of the similarly themed film Borat.

Verizon's V cast service also made The Papdits available to Verizon wireless subscribers.
