= Franz Drameh =

British actor (born 1993)

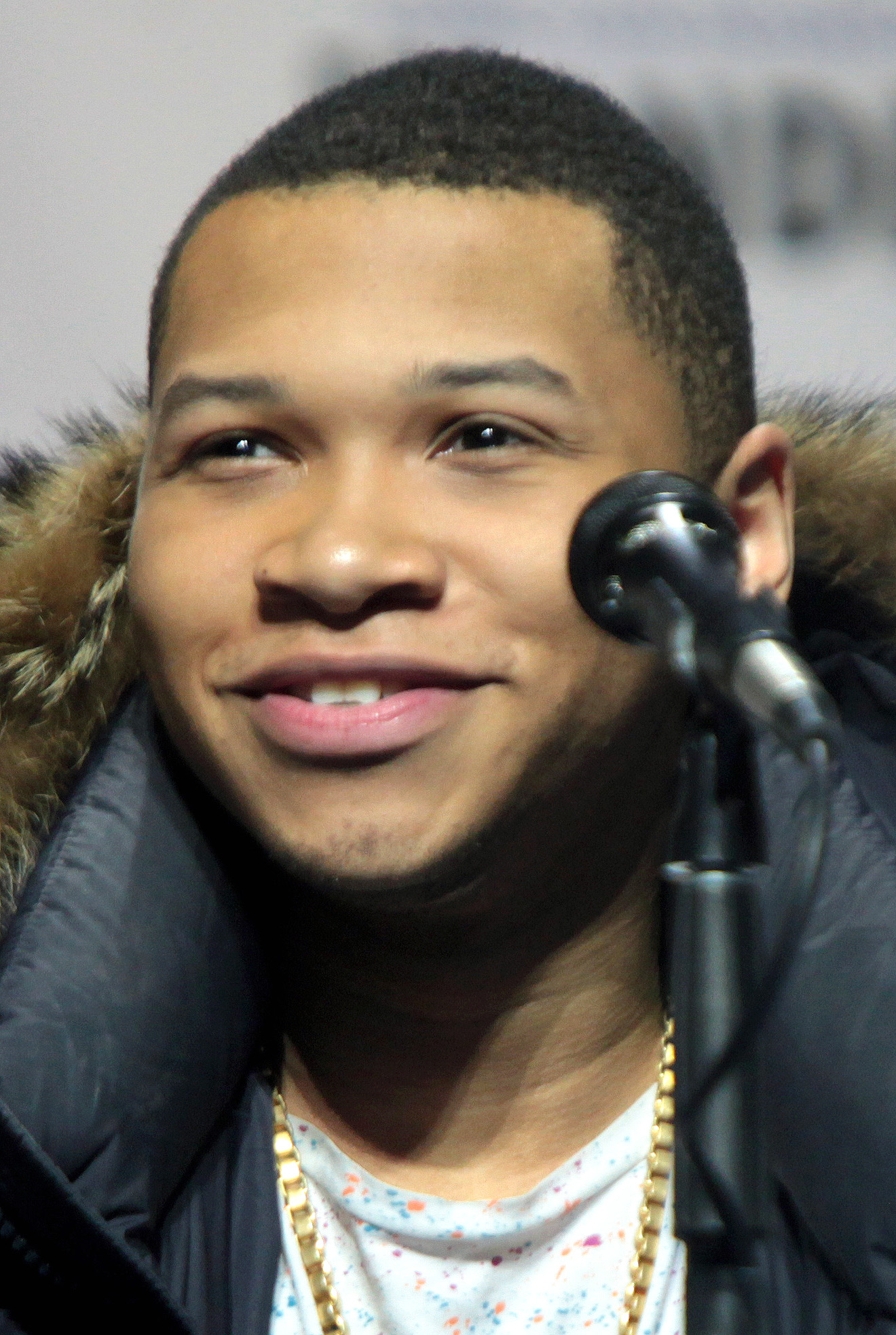
- Drameh at the 2016 WonderCon
- Born: Franz Alhusaine Drameh; 5 January 1993 (age 33); Hackney, London, England
- Occupation: Actor
- Years active: 2007–present

Franz Alhusaine Drameh (born 5 January 1993) is an English actor. His film debut was in Clint Eastwood's fantasy drama, Hereafter (2010). He also appeared in British film Attack the Block (2011) and the 2014 blockbuster Edge of Tomorrow. He played Jefferson Jackson/Firestorm in The CW's The Flash’s second season as well as the first three seasons of Legends of Tomorrow (2016–2018), and portrayed Boots in the Apple TV+ series See (2019–2021).

== Filmography ==
=== Film ===
Year	Title	Character	Notes
2009	Be Good	Older Brother	Short film
2010	Hereafter	Teenager	
2011	Painkiller	Dominic	Short film
2011	Attack the Block	Dennis	
2012	My Murder	Marcus	
2012	Now Is Good	Tommy	
2014	Edge of Tomorrow	Ford	
2015	Legacy	Sean	
2016	100 Streets	Kingsley	
2019	The Gentlemen	Benny	
2020	The Intergalactic Adventures of Max Cloud	Cowboy	
2021	Twist	Batesey	
2025	DRAGN	Sebastian Michaels	

=== Television ===
Year	Series	Character	Notes
2007	Casualty	Casey Hughes	Episode: "Lost in the Rough"
2008–09	Parents of the Band	Granville	6 episodes
2012	Casualty	Stevie Kingsley	3 episodes
2012–13	Some Girls	Brandon Taylor	9 episodes
2015	Residue	Willy G	3 episodes
2015	River	Bruno	2 episodes
2015–2017	The Flash	Jefferson Jackson / Firestorm	3 episodes
2016–2018, 2021	Legends of Tomorrow	Jefferson Jackson / Firestorm	44 episodes; Main role (seasons 1–3), guest role (season 7)
2016	Vixen	Jefferson Jackson / Firestorm	Episode #2.1, Web series (voice role)
2017	Supergirl	Jefferson Jackson / Firestorm	Episode: "Crisis on Earth-X, Part 1"
2017	Arrow	Jefferson Jackson / Firestorm	Episode: "Crisis on Earth-X, Part 2"
2019–2021	See	Boots	7 episodes
2024	The Edge of Sleep	Matteo Leon	6 episodes
