= Zinaid Memišević =

Bosnian actor (1950–2023)

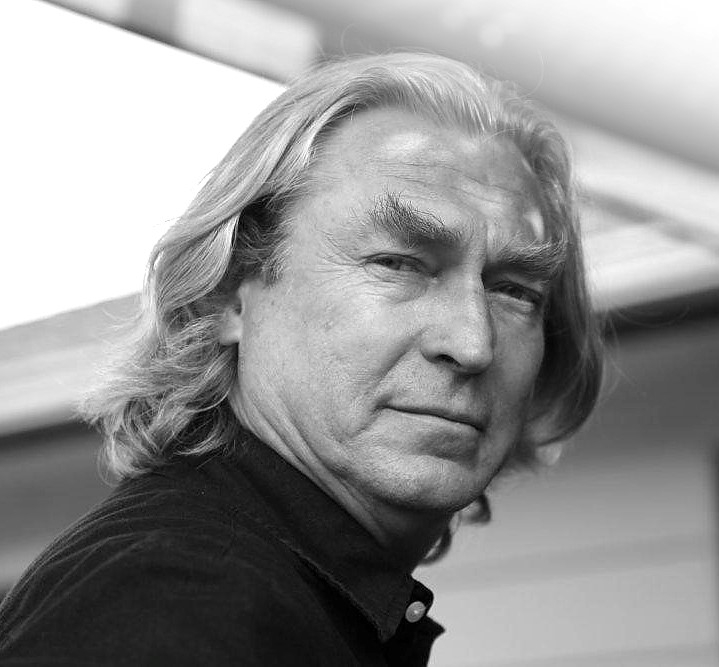
- Memišević in 2011
- Born: 26 April 1950; Sarajevo, PR Bosnia and Herzegovina, FPR Yugoslavia
- Died: 7 January 2023 (aged 72); Vancouver, BC, Canada
- Occupation: Actor

Zinaid "Miki" Memišević (zi'naid 'miki me'miʃevit͡ʃ; 26 April 1950 – 7 January 2023) was a Bosnian and Serbian theatre and film actor. Born in 1950 in Sarajevo, he lived and worked in Vancouver, Canada.

== Career ==
Memišević's first appearance on film in 1966 (Konjuh planinom) in a small role of a young boy, sparked his dream to become an actor and started a successful acting career. After graduating from the Academy of Dramatic Arts of the University of Belgrade in 1973, he became a permanent member of the company at the National Theatre in Belgrade and appeared on stage in numerous plays. He also played roles in many films and TV series that were produced in Yugoslavia during the 1980s and 1990s.

Following the breakup of Yugoslavia, he moved to Canada in 1994 with his family and continued his career there, appearing in several films and TV series. He "gave Hollywood's best-known portrayal" of Viktor Tikhonov, a Soviet ice hockey player and coach, in Miracle (2004) and appeared in cameos as the President Sergey Makarenko in 2012 (2009).

Memišević had roles in television films The Building (2009, dir. Terry Ingram), Ronnie and Julie (1997, dir. Philip Spink), and in a short film Henry's Café (1998, dir. Ted Bortolin, Geoff Denham). He also appeared in several episodes of various TV series, such as The X-Files (1996), Da Vinci's Inquest (2000 and 2002), and Jake 2.0 (2003).

In 2009 he was nominated for a Leo Award for the Best Performance by a Male in a Short Drama category for his role in the film Pappy and Speedster (2009, dir. Brae Norwiss).

Memišević played a significant role in Neworld Theatre and Touchstone Theatre's production of Wajdi Mouawad's play Tideline (2007), in which he appeared together with his daughter, Una Memišević, who is also an actress.

Memišević died on 7 January 2023, at the age of 72.

== Filmography ==
=== Film ===
Year	Title	Role	Notes
1966	Konjuh planinom	Franica	
1978	Bosko Buha	Viktor	
1983	Body Scent	Postar	
1989	Svedski aranzman	Mafián	
1999	Turbulence 2: Fear of Flying	Jan	
2001	Dark Water	Koyla	
2002	I Spy	Tent Chef	
2004	Miracle	Viktor Tikhonov	
2009	2012	President Sergey Makarenko	
2010	Smokin' Aces 2: Assassins' Ball	Russian Man	
2016	Countdown	Slava	

=== Television ===
Year	Title	Role	Notes
1973	Pozoriste u kući	Plavi	Episode: "Papan"
1975	Zašto je pucao Alija Alijagić	Nikola Petrović	Television film
1975	Kraj nedelje	Siniša	Television film
1977	Kucna terapija	Siniša	Television film
1980	Bosko Buha	Viktor	5 episodes
1982	Pastrovski vitez	Pisarcic	Television film
1985	Brisani prostor	Lisko	3 episodes
1986	Smesne i druge price	Kole	Episode: "Razgovori stari"
1987	Bolji život	Piletov rodjak	3 episodes
1988	Wolf Karadzich	Osman pasa	Episode: "Putovanje"
1996	The X-Files	The Cruel-Faced Man	Episode: "Wetwired"
1997	Breaking the Surface	Judge	Television film
1997	Ronnie & Julie	Peshlov	Television film
1997	The Outer Limits	Young Man	Episode: "Bodies of Evidence"
1999	The Net	Dmitri	Episode: "Pay the Line"
2000	Runaway Virus	Russian General	Television film
2000	The Adventures of Shirley Holmes	Pavlo	Episode: "The Case of the Desperate Dancer"
2000	Secret Agent Man	Vladimov	Episode: "Fail-Safe"
2000	Dark Angel	Captain	Episode: "Heat"
2000, 2002	Da Vinci's Inquest	Jim Schulte / Alfred	2 episodes
2003	Just Cause	Embassy Official	Episode: "Trial by Memory"
2003	Jake 2.0	Nicolai Iskanov	Episode: "Double Agent"
2009	The Building	Thaddius	Television film
2017	Arrow	Yurievich	Episode: "Second Chances"
2024	The Edge of Sleep	Vadim	Posthumous release; Episode: "The Dream Warrior"
