= Carlo Rota =

Canadian actor

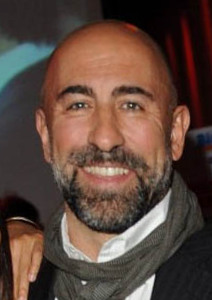
- Rota in 2009
- Born: Carlo Dante Rota; 17 April 1961 (age 65); London, England
- Occupations: Actor, producer, television host
- Years active: 1992–present
- Spouse: Nazneen Contractor (m. 2010)
- Children: 2

Carlo Dante Rota (born 17 April 1961) is a British-Canadian actor. He is known to television audiences for his roles as Yasir Hamoudi on Little Mosque on the Prairie (2007–12), systems analyst Morris O'Brian on 24 (2006–09), and Emilio Solano in Jane the Virgin (2014–15). He is a Gemini Award nominee.

== Early life ==
Rota was born in London, England, to Italian parents, Rina, who worked in the restaurant business, and Dante Rota, a chef. He grew up in Osterley with two sisters and one brother. Through his life he has lived in Italy, Hong Kong (where he attended Island School), the Bahamas and the United Kingdom, before his family settled in Toronto.

Rota worked in the culinary industry for many years, operating and owning several restaurants in Toronto until he decided to pursue an acting career. According to his interview in the book Inside Section One: Creating and Producing TV's La Femme Nikita, he said of this decision: "To turn around and tell everyone at the tender age of 30, 'Now I'm going to be an actor', most people just think that you're going through something."

== Career ==
Almost immediately thereafter, Rota landed roles in the Canadian TV series Street Legal and the critically acclaimed Canadian independent film Thirty Two Short Films About Glenn Gould. Because of his experience prior to acting, he also hosted the Great Canadian Food Show for CBC television in Canada, a series which was nominated for the James Beard Award for Excellence in Culinary Journalism.

He has appeared in TV series including 24, Queer as Folk (US version), Castle, La Femme Nikita, Relic Hunter, Adventure Inc, A Nero Wolfe Mystery, The Gospel of John, and Traders. Rota co-starred in the CBC sitcom Little Mosque on the Prairie, playing Lebanese-Canadian construction contractor Yasir Hamoudi. In 2008, Rota portrayed Charles, who was a journalist for The Herald, in Saw V.

On 24, Rota portrayed the recurring role of Morris O'Brian, the arrogant but brilliant computer scientist husband of Chloe O'Brian, appearing most extensively in season 6. He had a recurring role on the TV series La Femme Nikita (1997 — 2001) as the smarmy, green-listed terrorist informant, Mick Schtoppel, later revealed to be Mr. Jones, the head of Center, an organization above Oversight that directs all Sections. In turn, Mr. Jones is revealed to be another cover identity for Reginald "Martin" Henderson. Henderson is exposed as an actor working for Center as a decoy for the real Mr. Jones.

He has made guest appearances in many other television series, including Stargate Universe, playing Carl Strom, head of the International Oversight Advisory, the civilian oversight committee that heads up the Atlantis expedition and its funding, as a villain named "The Ghost" on White Collar, as well as roles on CSI: NY, Human Target, Castle, The Mentalist, Bones, and Grimm. He also appeared on NCIS: Los Angeles in the episode "Found" as Kalil Abramson, as well as on AMC's show, Breaking Bad. He was a guest on episode 11 of the second season of Top Chef Canada, the episode dedicated to Italian cuisine 1. He acts as Edmund Wooler in World Without End on Reelz Channel.

Rota joined the cast of General Hospital in 2024 in the role of Jenz Sidwell.

== Personal life ==
Rota married 24 and Relic Hunter co-star Nazneen Contractor on 1 April 2010. They have two children, a son and a daughter.

During his time on the show 24, Rota spent nine months a year living in Los Angeles, California. He stated in an interview with the Toronto Star that he considers Toronto his home. As of 2008, he owned a house on Queen Street West, having lived on and off in the area for at least 20 years.

== Filmography ==
=== Film ===
Carlo Rota film credits
Year	Title	Role	Notes
1993	Thirty Two Short Films About Glenn Gould	CBS Producer	Credited as 'Carlo D. Rota'
1995	First Degree	Joe Galeno	Direct-to-video
1996	Maximum Risk	Bohemia Bartender	
1996	Joe's Wedding	Art Council Man	
1997	The Wrong Guy	French Restaurant Waiter	
1997	City of Dark	Plato	
1998	Clutch	Richard	
1999	Jigsaw	Richard	
1999	The Boondock Saints	Giuseppe "Papa Joe" Yakavetta	
1999	Have Mercy	Jack	
2000	Mission to Mars	Ambassador	
2000	Passengers	Doctor	Short film
2001	On Their Knees	Walter	
2002	Rock My World	Tony Manson	
2002	Countdown	Bruce Donato	Short film
2003	The Gospel of John	Chief Temple Guard	
2005	Horsie's Retreat	Spiro	
2005	The Last Hit	Mario	
2005	Cake	Bob Jackman	
2007	Small Potatoes	Henry Zanzibar	Short film
2008	Cold Play	John / Mortimer	Short film
2008	Saw V	Charles Salomon	
2009	Shark City	Ventura Ritt	
2009	The Fatal Five	Himself	Documentary
2010	24: Chloe's Arrest	Morris O'Brian	
2010	The Day the Old Man Knocked	Narrator	Short film
2010	Son of a Don	Avi	Short film
2011	Rehab		
2011	Irvine Welsh's Ecstasy	Solo	
2011	Man on the Train	Max	
2014	Small Time	Panama hat man	
2014	Brick Mansions	George "The Greek"	
2015	After the Ball	Richard	
2017	People You May Know	Bill	
2018	Spinning Man	Santos	
2018	State Like Sleep	Dr. Iyengar	
2018	Welcome to Nowhere	The General	
2018	Hell Is Where the Home Is	Sergeant Daniels	
2019	Cliffs of Freedom	Mustapha Bey	
2019	The Big Wish	Morlett	
2019	The Diggers	Mister Meister	
2020	A Perfect Plan	Theo	
2021	Trigger Point	Dwight Logan	
2022	Me Tiime	Alberto	
TBD	Six Guns for Hire	The Bandit	

=== Television ===
Carlo Rota television credits
Year	Title	Role	Notes
1992	Street Legal	Waiter	Episode: "The Phoenix"
1993	Counterstrike	Lonnie Blanc	Episode: "The Contender" (Credited as Carlo Roti)
1993	Matrix	Roche	Episode: "Shadows from the Past"
1994	TekWar: TekLab	Doorman	TV movie
1995	Young at Heart	Bartender	TV movie
1995	Friends at Last	Neil	TV movie
1995	Down Came a Blackbird	Sergeant Manuel Ortega	TV movie
1996	The Sentinel	Jack Buchanan	Episode: The Rig
1996–1998	Traders	Burnet	9 episodes
1997–2001	La Femme Nikita	Mick Schtoppel / Shtoopel / Mr. Jones	15 episodes
1998	Highlander: The Raven	Mario Cardoza	Episode: "Full Disclosure"
1998	Naked City: Justice with a Bullet	Findlay Clerk	TV movie
1998	Black Harbour	Grant	Episode: "Mr. Sensitivity"
1999	Murder in a Small Town	Charles	TV movie
1999	Total Recall 2070	Kelly	Episode: "Rough Whimper of Insanity"
1999	Earth: Final Conflict	Margolis	Episode: "Crossfire"
1999	Bonanno: A Godfather's Story		TV movie
1999	PSI Factor: Chronicles of the Paranormal	Bert Kay	Episode: "Happy Birthday, Matt Praeger"
1999	The Last Witness	Mr. Zander	TV movie
2000	The Edible Road Show	Host	
2000	Catch a Falling Star	Harry Goldberg	TV movie
2000	Anne of Green Gables: The Continuing Story	Cockney Driver	Miniseries
2000	Trapped in a Purple Haze	David Lebeff	TV movie
2000	Canada: A People's History	David Samwell	Documentary series Episode: "When the World Began"
2000	Phantom of the Megaplex	Tyler Jesseman	TV movie
2000–2001	Relic Hunter	Sultan / Lagerfeld	2 episodes
2001	A Colder Kind of Death	Hairdresser	TV movie
2001	Doc	Jason Hemmings	Episode: "Pilot: Part 1"
2001	Rough Air: Danger on Flight 534	Cal Matthews	TV movie
2002	Recipe for Murder	Simeon Vreeman	TV movie
2002	A Nero Wolfe Mystery	Barry Fleming / Spiros Papps / Felix Courret	4 episodes
2002	Adventure Inc.	Sergi Borodin	Episode: "Village of the Lost"
2002–2004	Queer as Folk	Gardner Vance	9 episodes
2003	Veritas: The Quest	Ali Hassan Rif	Episode: "Heist"
2003	Train 48	Max	Episode: #1.53
2003	Street Time	Arthur Marx	2 episodes
2004	Show Me Yours	Paul	Episode: "If You Can't Take the Heat"
2004	Il Duce Canadese	Avvocato	Miniseries
2006	This Is Wonderland	Giuseppe Burelli	Episode: #3.8
2006	Time Bomb	Musab Hyatti	TV movie
2006	At the Hotel	Albert	Miniseries
2006	I Am an Apartment Building	Host	Short TV movie
2006–2009	24	Morris O'Brian	29 episodes
2007–2012	Little Mosque on the Prairie	Yasir Hamoudi	Main role, 90 episodes
2008	Shark	Anton Robitaille	Episode: "Partners in Crime"
2008	Othello the Tragedy of the Moor	Othello	TV movie Executive producer
2009	White Collar	Ghovat	Episode: "Threads"
2009	Stargate Universe	Carl Strom	2 episodes
2009	Castle	Bahir Harun	Episode: "The Fifth Bullet"
2010	Love Letters	Andy	TV movie
2010	CSI: NY	Joseph Vance	Episode: "Sanguine Love"
2010	NCIS: Los Angeles	Kalil Abramson	Episode: "Found"
2010	The Good Guys	Asher	Episode: "Supercops"
2010–2012	Goldilocks	Ivan	3 episodes
2011	Breaking Bad	Benicio Fuentes	Episode: "Salud"
2011	The Mentalist	Dimitri Zubov	Episode: "Where in the World is Carmine O'Brien?"
2011	Sanctuary	Richard Feliz / Feodor "Frank" Glazov	3 episodes
2011	Bones	Lambert Chaisson	Episode: “The Finder”
2012	Nikita	Ian Damascus	Episode: "Shadow Walker"
2012	ThunderCats	Ratar-O (voice)	Episode: "Curse of Ratilla"
2012	World Without End	Edmund	Miniseries
2012	Hawaii Five-0	Sean Winston	Episode: "Ohuna"
2013	Beverly Hills Cop	Trevor	TV movie
2014	Agents of S.H.I.E.L.D.	Luca Russo	Episode: "T.R.A.C.K.S."
2014	CSI: Crime Scene Investigation	Karl Schrute	Episode: "Killer Moves
2014	Grimm	Hedig	Episode: "The Show Must Go On"
2014	Scandal	Ivan	3 episodes
2014	Sequestered	Niles	Episode: "Ashes to Ashes"
2014	Recipe to Riches	Host	Episode: "Savoury Snacks"
2014–15	Jane the Virgin	Emilio Solano	8 episodes
2015	The Player	Daoud Raqiv	Episode: "The Pilot"
2016	Dark Matter	Warden	2 episodes
2016	Beauty & the Beast	Dr. Albert Garrus	Episode: "Meet the New Beast"
2016	Major Crimes	Alfredo DeConchini	Episode: "Family Law"
2016	Swedish Dicks	Dimitri Nobakov	2 episodes
2016	Conviction	Vince Scarlata	Episode: "A Simple Man"
2017	Lopez	Danny Green	Episode: "Leaving Las Vegas"
2017	Scorpion	General Savic	Episode: "Rock Block"
2017	Jean-Claude Van Johnson	Dragan	3 episodes
2017–18	Lethal Weapon	Guillermo Azoulay	2 episodes
2017–18	Ransom	Damian Delaine	3 episodes
2018	American Horror Story: Apocalypse	Anton LaVey	3 episodes
2018	Back in Time for Dinner	Host	
2019	The Flash	Remington Meister	Episode: "License to Elongate"
2020	Canadian Film Fest Presented by Super Channel	Theo	Episode: #1.3; Segment: "A Perfect Plan"
2020	Borrasca	Officer Jameson / Pastor	2 episodes
2020	Back in Time for Winter	Narrator	
2021	Titans	Oracle (voice)	Episode: "51%"
2023	True Lies	Francois	Episode: "Pilot"
2023	High Desert	Arman	Recurring role, 5 episodes
2024	The Edge of Sleep	Dr. Luis Castaneda	2 episodes
2024–present	General Hospital	Jenz Sidwell	Contract Role
2025	The Rookie	Anton Petrovich	Episode: "The Gala"

=== Video games ===
Year	Title	Role	Notes
2013	Tom Clancy's Splinter Cell: Blacklist	Majid Sadiq	Voice and likeness
2020	Mafia: Definitive Edition	Additional voices	
2020	Assassin's Creed Valhalla	Basim Ibn Ishaq / Loki	Voice
2024	Indiana Jones and the Great Circle	Father Cesare Ventura	Voice and likeness
2025	Mafia: The Old Country	Raffaele Fontanella	Voice and likeness

== Bibliography ==
- Heyn, Christopher. "A Conversation with Carlo Rota." Inside Section One: Creating and Producing TV's La Femme Nikita. Introduction by Peta Wilson. Los Angeles: Persistence of Vision Press, 2006. 82–87. ISBN 0-9787625-0-9. In-depth conversation with Carlo Rota about his role as Schtoppel on La Femme Nikita, as well as his culinary background and early acting experiences.
