= Eve Harlow =

Russian-born actress (born 1989)

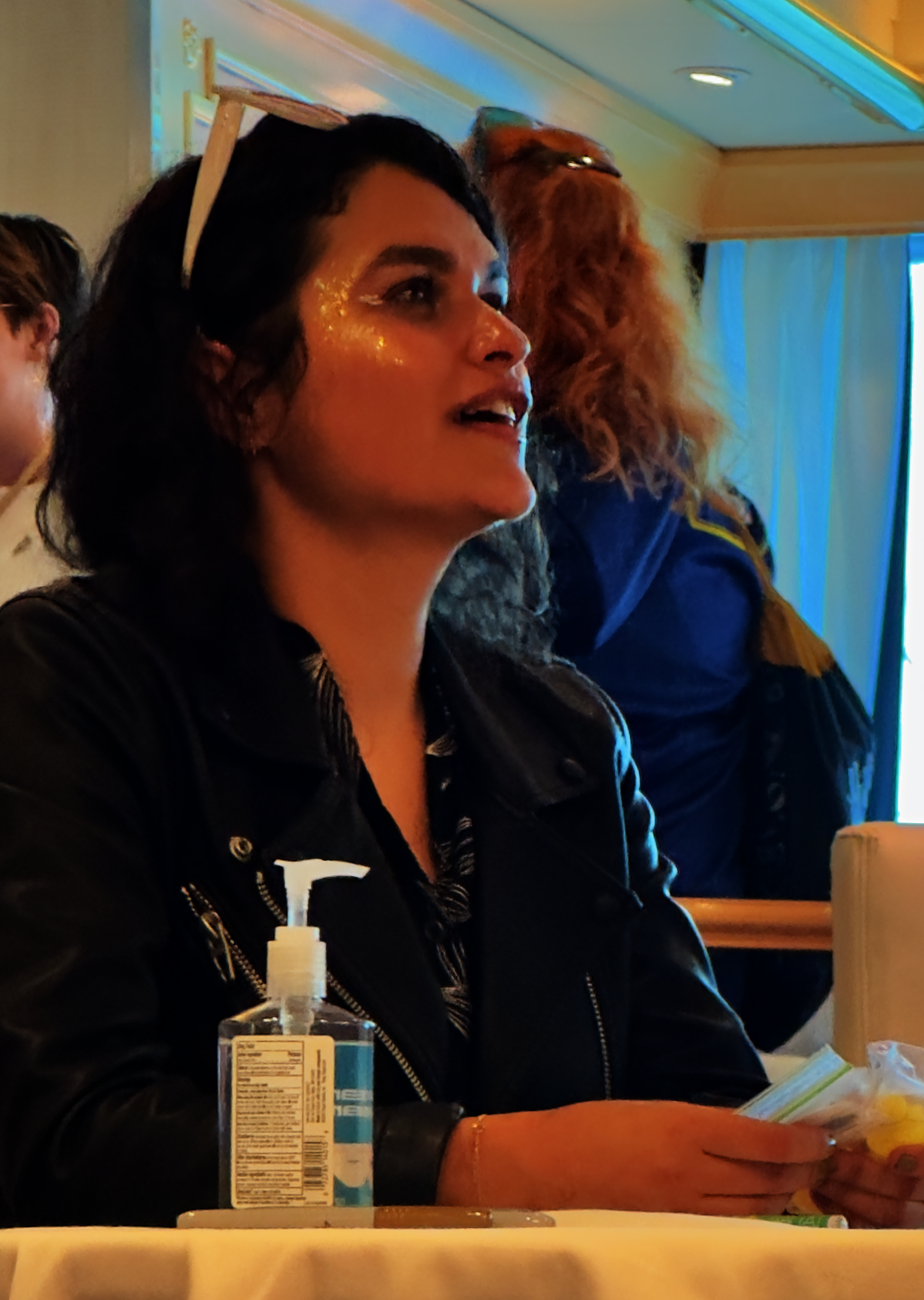
- Harlow in February 2024
- Born: 20 June 1989 (age 37); Moscow, Russian SFSR; Soviet Union
- Occupation: Actress
- Years active: 2007–present

Eve Harlow (born 20 June) is a Russian actress in Canadian and American media.

== Personal life ==
Eve Harlow was born on 20 June 1989 in Soviet Moscow; she is of Jewish descent. After she and her family first immigrated to Israel, they moved to Canada when she was seven years old.

== Career ==
A film and television actress, Harlow has performed in Canadian and US productions. Harlow appeared in the TV series The Haunting Hour: The Series, The Killing, and Titans.

=== Performance credits ===
==== Film ====
Film performances
Year	Title	Role	Citations
2007	Juno		
2007	My Name Is Sarah		
2008	Sheltered Life		
2009	2012		
2009	Jennifer's Body		
2009	Living Out Loud	Jenny Skinner	
2012	The Tall Man	Christine	
2012	When You Sleep	Jessie	
2015	Lost After Dark	Marilyn	
2016	We're Still Together	Claire	
2019	The Tomorrow Man	Tina	
2021	Trigger Point	Monica Kane	

==== Television ====
Television performances
Years	Title	Role	Episodes/notes	Citations
2009	The Guard		"Last Night" & "Boom"	
2010	Fringe	Cashier	"The Bishop Revival"	
2011	Flashpoint		"Good Cop"	
2014	Lost Girl		"Origin"	
2014–2015, 2019	The 100	Maya Vie	Season 2 and season 6 episodes	
2015	UnREAL	Bethany	"Relapse"	
2015–2016	Heroes Reborn	Taylor Kravid	Recurring role	
2016	12 Monkeys	Vanessa	"Hyena"	
2016	Ray Donovan		"The Texan"	
2017–2018	Agents of S.H.I.E.L.D.	Tess	Season 5 episodes	
2018	SEAL Team	Jamie	"Say Again Your Last"	
2019	NCIS: Los Angeles	Katie Miller	"The One That Got Away"	
2019	The Rookie	Bianca Windle	"Tough Love"	
2020	The Rookie	Bianca Windle	"Control"	
2020	Next	Gina	All ten episodes	
2023	The Night Agent	Ellen		
2024	Star Trek: Discovery	Moll	Season 5 episodes	
2024	The Edge of Sleep		Starring role	
2025–2026	Watson	Ingrid Derian	Leading actor	

=== Awards ===
Award	Year	Nominated work	Category	Result	Citations
Leo Award	2009	"Boom" (The Guard)	Best Supporting Performance by a Female in a Dramatic Series	Won	
Gemini Award	2010	"Boom" / "Last Night" (The Guard)	Best Performance by an Actress in a Featured Supporting Role in a Dramatic Series	Nominated	
