= Dance film =

Film or video work centred on dance

A dance film, also called screendance, is a film or video work in which dance and choreography are central. It may be created specifically for the camera or adapted from a dance first made for live performance. The field also uses terms such as dance for camera, cine dance and videodance, although their meanings often overlap.

Dance has been recorded and explored through moving images since cinema's earliest years. During the late twentieth century, screendance developed into a distinct field and later expanded through international festivals, exhibitions and scholarship.

== History ==
In The Oxford Handbook of Screendance Studies, Douglas Rosenberg traces the relationship between dance and the screen to the earliest days of photography, but dates the emergence of an identifiable body of work called screendance to the latter part of the twentieth century. He describes the field as becoming an international movement during the early twenty-first century through festivals, museum and gallery exhibitions, and an expanding body of scholarship.

Dance scholar Erin Brannigan places the beginnings of dancefilm alongside the birth of modern dance and cinema at the end of the nineteenth century. She identifies recordings made by Thomas Edison and the Lumière brothers of vaudeville dancers including Amy Muller and Betsy Ross among the earliest encounters between dance and film.

Writing in the journal Choreologia, Ayaha Matsuoka describes screendance as an umbrella term for work also called dance film, cine dance, videodance and dance for camera. She identifies their shared feature as the presentation of dance through a screen, while noting that the term covers such varied work that the field can lack unity.

== Examples ==
British company DV8 Physical Theatre developed a series of screen adaptations during the expansion of televised dance film in the United Kingdom. Director David Hinton adapted the company's stage works as Dead Dreams of Monochrome Men (1990), Strange Fish (1992) and Touched (1994); these were followed by Clara van Gool's film of Enter Achilles and Lloyd Newson's The Cost of Living (2004). Hanna Pajala-Assefa writes that the later films carry their dramatic arcs through physicality and dance.

Chris Brandt's 2002 machinima work Dance, Voldo, Dance uses two players controlling the character Voldo in Soulcalibur to create a synchronized dance from the game's existing movements. Martin Picard describes the work as an example of gameplay as performance.

Mitchell Rose's short film Deere John (2000), later incorporated into the four-part suite Modern Daydreams, features dancer Jamey Hampton performing a duet with a 22-ton excavator. Reviewing the collection for Film Threat, Rick Kisonak praised the duet's combination of grace and absurdity.

Mexican video artist Pola Weiss Álvarez began exploring the relationship between choreography and video in Flor Cósmica (1977), which used a television-generated kaleidoscope synchronized with electronic music. In Videodanza, viva video danza (1979), Weiss treated the camera as an active participant in the choreography rather than a static observer.

Liz Aggiss and Billy Cowie's short film Motion Control (2002), directed by David Alexander Anderson and produced by the Arts Council of England and the BBC, combines Aggiss's performance with camera movement, editing, sound and colour as choreographic elements. Pajala-Assefa describes the film as a dystopian choreographic whole influenced by horror and science fiction.

Aggiss and Cowie's four-screen stereoscopic gallery installation Men in the Wall (2004) placed four separately framed performers across a projected wall. Dance scholar Harmony Bench analyzes the work as an example of anti-gravitational choreography, in which performers filmed against a green screen are detached from their original performance space and projected into shifting landscapes.

== See also ==
- Dance in film
- Dance on television
- Musical film
