= Beltaine (disambiguation) =

Bealtaine (also called Beltane) is an ancient Gaelic holiday.

Beltaine (or Beltane) may also refer to:

- Beltaine (band), a Polish folk band
- Beltaine, a song and album by Inkubus Sukkubus
- Beltane Fire Festival, every 30 April in Edinburgh, Scotland
  - Beltane Fire Society, operates the festival
