= Liz Ranken =

British choreographer and painter

- Born: Elizabeth Ranken
- Education: London University
- Occupations: Choreographer; painter

Elizabeth Ranken is a British choreographer, performer, director, movement director and artist. She is an Associate Artist of the Royal Shakespeare Company (RSC) and was a lead performer with DV8 Physical Theatre. Her work encompasses opera, theatre, physical theatre, dance, television, film and art.

== Early years ==
Ranken initially read biology and holds a BSc from London University. She later qualified as a speech therapist from Central School of Speech and Drama before moving to Laban Dance Centre to train in choreography and performance.

== Career ==
On leaving Laban Dance Centre, Ranken was invited by Jacob Marley to set up Company of Cracks, which was a cross over between dance and performance art. In the early '80s, Ranken met Angus Farquhar and became a member of the industrial music group Test Dept.

In 1986, Ranken was invited by Lloyd Newson to join DV8 Physical Theatre as a deviser and performer. She became an Artist in Residence at the Centre for Contemporary Arts (CCA, Glasgow) creating her own work.

In 1992 Ranken began a collaboration with Shared Experience, working with Helen Edmundson and becoming an Associate Artist for the company. In 1993 Ranken won the Edinburgh Evening News Capital Award for directing, devising and performing 'Funk Off Green' at the Edinburgh Fringe.

Ranken was invited by Michael Attenborough to work as Movement Director at the RSC, ultimately becoming an Associate Artist with the company. She has an ongoing association with Michael Boyd, who later became artistic director at the Royal Shakespeare Company.

Ranken began painting in 2011 with a painting of Michael Boyd, which is currently in the collection at the RSC.

In 2015, she made her debut as a choreographer in opera with L'Orfeo for the Royal Opera House.

== Theatre ==
Credits as Movement Director:

Year	Title	Production	Notes
1991	Anna Karenina	Shared Experience	directed by Nancy Meckler, revived 1993 & 1998
1992	The Changeling by Thomas Middleton	Royal Shakespeare Company	directed by Michael Attenborough
1993	Mill on the Floss	Shared Experience	directed by Nancy Meckler and Polly Teale, revived 1995 & 2001
1995	Richard III by William Shakespeare	Royal Shakespeare Company	directed by Steven Pimlott
1996	War and Peace	Shared Experience and Royal National Theatre	directed by Nancy Meckler and Polly Teale, revived 2008
1996	As You Like It by William Shakespeare	Royal Shakespeare Company	directed by Steven Pimlott
1996	Jane Eyre	Shared Experience	directed by Polly Teale, revived 2006
1997	The Tempest	Shared Experience	directed by Nancy Meckler
1998	Troilus and Cressida by William Shakespeare	Royal Shakespeare Company	directed by Michael Boyd
1998	The House of Bernarda Alba	Shared Experience	directed by Polly Teale
1998	Arabian Nights	Young Vic (1998)and Royal Shakespeare Company (2009)	directed by Dominic Cooke
1999	A Midsummer Night's Dream by William Shakespeare	Royal Shakespeare Company	directed by Michael Boyd, transferred to Brooklyn Academy of Music (BAM)
1999	Mother Courage and her Children	Shared Experience	directed by Nancy Meckler
2000	Romeo and Juliet by William Shakespeare	Royal Shakespeare Company	directed by Michael Boyd
2000	Henry VI by William Shakespeare	Royal Shakespeare Company and The Roundhouse	directed by Michael Boyd
2000	Henry VI: Part II by William Shakespeare	Royal Shakespeare Company and The Roundhouse	directed by Michael Boyd, revived 2006
2000	Henry VI: The Battle for the Throne by William Shakespeare	Royal Shakespeare Company and The Roundhouse	directed by Michael Boyd, revived 2006
2001	Richard III by William Shakespeare	Royal Shakespeare Company and The Roundhouse	directed by Michael Boyd, revived 2006
2002	The Magic Toyshop	Shared Experience	directed by Polly Teale
2002	The Malcontent by John Marston	Royal Shakespeare Company	directed by Dominic Cooke
2002	The Tempest by William Shakespeare	Royal Shakespeare Company	directed by Michael Boyd
2003	A Passage to India	Shared Experience	directed by Nancy Meckler
2003	Cymbeline by William Shakespeare	Royal Shakespeare Company	directed by Dominic Cooke
2003	A Doll's House	Shared Experience	directed Polly Teale
2004	Gone to Earth	Shared Experience	directed Nancy Meckler
2004	Macbeth by William Shakespeare	Royal Shakespeare Company	directed by Dominic Cooke
2004	House of Desires	Royal Shakespeare Company	directed by Nancy Meckler
2004	Hamlet	Royal Shakespeare Company	directed by Michael Boyd
2005	Brontë	Shared Experience	directed Nancy Meckler, revived 2010 & 2011
2005	Twelfth Night by William Shakespeare	Royal Shakespeare Company	directed by Michael Boyd
2005	The Comedy of Errors by William Shakespeare	Royal Shakespeare Company	directed by Nancy Meckler
2005	As You Like It by William Shakespeare	Royal Shakespeare Company	directed by Dominic Cooke
2006	Orestes	Shared Experience	directed Nancy Meckler
2006	The Crucible by Arthur Miller	Royal Shakespeare Company	directed by Dominic Cooke
2006	Romeo and Juliet by William Shakespeare	Royal Shakespeare Company	directed by Nancy Meckler
2006	Pericles by William Shakespeare	Royal Shakespeare Company	directed by Dominic Cooke
2006	The Winter's Tale by William Shakespeare	Royal Shakespeare Company	directed by Dominic Cooke
2007	Kindertransport	Shared Experience	directed by Polly Teale
2007	Richard II	Royal Shakespeare Company and The Roundhouse	directed by Michael Boyd
2007	Henry IV	Royal Shakespeare Company and The Roundhouse	directed by Michael Boyd
2007	Henry IV: Part II	Royal Shakespeare Company and The Roundhouse	directed by Michael Boyd
2007	Noughts & Crosses by Malorie Blackman	Royal Shakespeare Company	directed by Dominic Cooke
2008	Mine	Shared Experience	directed by Polly Teale
2008	The Dance of Death	Shaftesbury Theatre	directed by Sean Matthias
2009	The Caucasian Chalk Circle	Shared Experience	directed by Nancy Meckler
2010	The Glass Menagerie	Shared Experience	directed by Polly Teale
2011	Speechless	Shared Experience	directed by Polly Teale
2000	Fireface	Royal Court Theatre (2000) Young Vic (2012)	directed by Dominic Cooke
2012	Mary Shelley	Shared Experience	directed by Polly Teale
2013	All's Well That Ends Well by William Shakespeare	Royal Shakespeare Company	directed by Nancy Meckler
2013	Bracken Moor	Shared Experience	directed by Polly Teale
2015	Mermaid	Shared Experience	directed by Polly Teale
2018	Tamburlaine by Christopher Marlowe	Royal Shakespeare Company	directed by Michael Boyd
2021	The Normal Heart by Larry Kramer	The National Theatre	directed by Dominic Cooke

== Physical Theatre and Dance ==
Credits:

Year	Title	Production	Notes
1987	Deep End	DV8 Physical Theatre	conceived and directed by Lloyd Newson starring Nigel Charnock, Lloyd Newson, Michelle Richecoeur, Liz Ranken
1987	My Body, Your Body	DV8 Physical Theatre	conceived and directed by Lloyd Newson

== Opera ==
Credits as Choreographer and Movement Director:

Year	Opera	Production	Notes
2015	Orfeo by Monteverdi	Royal Opera House & The Roundhouse	directed by Michael Boyd
2016	Eugene Onegin by Pyotr Ilyich Tchaikovsky	Garsington Opera	directed by Michael Boyd, starring Roderick Williams and Brindley Sherratt.
2017	Pelléas et Mélisande by Claude Debussy	Garsington Opera	directed by Michael Boyd
2017	The Cunning Little Vixen by Leoš Janáček	Byre Opera	directed by PJ Harris
2021	Eugene Onegin by Pyotr Ilyich Tchaikovsky	Garsington Opera	directed by Michael Boyd

== Film work ==
Ranken has appeared in the following films:

- 1990 Silences
- 1991 Caught Looking directed by Constantine Giannaris
- 1991 Edward II directed by Derek Jarman
- 1993 Three Steps to Heaven directed by Constantine Giannaris'
- 1994 Touched directed by Wendy Houstoun

Ranken was the choreographer for:

- 1997 The film Alive and Kicking directed by Nancy Meckler. This film is also known as Indian Summer
- 2000 3 Steps to Heaven, directed by Constantine Giannaris

== Awards ==
- 1988 Ranken won The Place portfolio choreographic award with composer John Eacott. This was for artists to watch out for and invest in. Matthew Bourne also won this award in the same year.
- 1992 She won The Time Out Award for choreographing Anna Karenina for Shared Experience theatre company.
- 1993 Ranken won the Edinburgh Evening News Capital Award for directing, devising and performing 'Funk Off Green' at the Edinburgh Fringe

== Paintings ==
2011: Ranken's portrait of Michael Boyd was taken into the Royal Shakespeare Company Portrait collection.

2013: Ranken's painting, entitled Held in Infinity, was taken into the Heinz Archive and Library at The National Portrait Gallery.

== Other ==
- 1986: Ranken began performing with the band Test Department. At this time, she had started to collaborate with Test Department's percussionist Angus Farquhar while she was at the Laban. He was at Goldsmiths studying drama and they shared the same campus. In 1998 Ranken collaborated with Angus Farquhar and his new company NVA performing at the National Day for Britain at the World EXPO in Lisbon. They created a pagan fire festival with musicians and dancers from Scotland and Portugal, burning 15-meter high straw figures (gigantones) in front of a live audience of 10,000.
- 1992: She was performer/choreographer for The Big Tease working with strippers for the Edinburgh Fringe festival. Ranken performed alongside the strippers whose autobiographies were the basis of the show.
- 1995: She was the performer/devisor of Doing Bird directed by Irvine Allan for Glasgow Mayfest, then touring prisons in Scotland including Barlinnie Prison. The piece then was performed at the West Yorkshire Playhouse, and toured prisons in Leeds including Armley Jail.
