= Lloyd Newson =

Lloyd Newson OBE
- Born: March 2, 1957 (age 69); Albury, New South Wales, Australia
- Education: University of Melbourne
- Occupations: Choreographer, director, dancer
- Years active: 1978 - 2022
- Notable work: DV8 Physical Theatre
- Website: www.dv8.co.uk

Lloyd Newson OBE (born 1957) is a director, dancer and choreographer. He formed DV8 Physical Theatre and has led the company since its inception in 1986. He studied psychology and social work at Melbourne University and after graduating began his dancing career in New Zealand, initially as a dancer but later also as a choreographer.

DV8 Physical Theatre was formed as a response to Newson's increasing frustration with the superficiality of contemporary dance. DV8's work is characterised by the desire to communicate ideas and feelings clearly and unpretentiously, with a focus on socio-political issues.

Under the banner of DV8 Physical Theatre, Newson's work has won 55 national and international awards. He has choreographed and directed DV8's work since its inception, with the exception of My Sex; Our Dance (1986) which was co-created with performer Nigel Charnock. Between 1986 and 1992 Newson frequently collaborated with performers Michelle Richecoeur, Nigel Charnock and Wendy Houstoun.

Dead Dreams of Monochrome Men premiered in 1988, and was the first of Newson's work to be adapted for film (1990). Further film translations of stage shows include Strange Fish (1992), Enter Achilles (1995), and The Cost of Living (2004).

Living Costs (2003) was the company's first site specific performance, in collaboration with Tate Modern, and featured elements from the stage production The Cost of Living. In 2004 Newson conceived and directed the film version of this work which was set on location in Cromer, an English seaside town.

Since 2007, Newson's work has combined his individual style of movement with verbatim text. These verbatim-dance works deal with contemporary issues: religious tolerance and intolerance towards sexuality in To Be Straight With You (2007–09), censorship and freedom of speech in Can we Talk About This? (2011–12) and a man's attempt to escape his criminal background and redeem his life in JOHN (2014–15).

== Early life and career ==
Born in Albury, New South Wales in 1957, Newson attended the University of Melbourne, from which he graduated in 1978. Whilst studying psychology and social work, he started attending dance classes with Margaret Lasica and regularly performed with her company, the Modern Dance Ensemble. By the time of his graduation, Newson had become interested in pursuing dance professionally, and subsequently joined Impulse Dance Theatre (1979), on a combined tour with the Royal New Zealand Ballet Company.

He travelled to London in 1980 performing with the Australian company One Extra Dance Theatre and whilst there won a scholarship to London Contemporary Dance School (1980-1981). Between 1981 and 1985 he danced with Extemporary Dance Theatre (UK).

== DV8 Physical Theatre ==
=== History ===
By 1986, Newson had worked with 28 different choreographers and was beginning to feel increasingly frustrated by lack of subject matter within the British contemporary dance scene. He has been quoted as saying that he felt the majority of the work he had been dancing in was 'conning' audiences 'about the depth' of what was being presented. Seeking a way to challenge the limitations of dance, he began to explore the concept of physical theatre, which he saw as allowing him to use 'any means necessary to find the most appropriate way to say something'. He subsequently formed DV8 Physical Theatre in 1986. Since its inception, the company has been characterised by work that incorporates a range of mediums, including elements of theatre, dance, film and text.

=== Early work ===
The first work Newson produced with the new company was My Sex, Our Dance (1986), created in partnership with the performer Nigel Charnock. It tackled the emergence of AIDS as a social issue, exploring through physical risk-taking the extent to which two men can trust each other. This was followed by Deep End (1987), and Elemen T(H)ree Sex (1987), works which focused on heterosexual relationships. These works toured the UK, with Elemen T(H)ree sharing a bill in 1987 with My Sex, Our Dance; something Deep End would also do in 1987 and 1988.

In 1987 the company premiered My Body, Your Body, which featured performer Wendy Houstoun, who had attended a workshop and quickly became a frequent collaborator with the company. The work, based on audio recordings of a close female friend of Newson's and the book Women Who Love Too Much by Robin Norwood, explored the psychology of women who seek out relationships with abusive men. Initially conceived with students at Leicester Polytechnic (now De Montfort University), the piece was remounted and toured the UK at the end of 1987.

Dead Dreams of Monochrome Men followed in 1988, and drew inspiration from the book Killing for Company, written about the mass-murderer Dennis Nielsen. The work premiered at the Third Eye Centre in Glasgow, and received critical acclaim, going on to win the 1989 Time Out Dance Award, and the Evening Standard Ballet Award for the same year. In 1990, the work was adapted for film with the director David Hinton and went on to be awarded as The Best Stage Performance Reworked for the Camera by IMZ Dance Screen.

=== 1990: If Only... ===
After Dead Dreams on Monochrome Men, Newson has stated that he was 'fatigued by the bruising physicality' of his earlier works. His, and DV8's, following production, If Only... (1990) marked a stylistic change from previous works; later described by Newson as being 'less combative' and 'more poetical'. The main protagonist was a woman, Wendy Houstoun. The work was inspired by Bertrand Russell’s writings on happiness, and much like Dead Dreams of Monochrome Men, the production was critically acclaimed, winning the Golden Pegasus Award at 1990's Melbourne International Festival.

=== Strange Fish, MSM and Enter Achilles ===
In Strange Fish (1992) Newson altered his approach to new work by writing narratives in advance of the rehearsal period. Wendy Houstoun again played the central role in the production. Strange Fish explored friendship and, in Newson's own words, 'the search for something or someone to believe in'. Co-produced by EXPO Seville, Britain at EXPO and National Arts Centre Ottawa, the show opened in Seville and saw its UK premiere at Tramway, Glasgow. The Independent newspaper called it 'one of the richest and most unsparing theatrical experiences' they had had 'in a long time'. The work was also awarded a London Dance & Performance Award (1992) and adapted for film, with director David Hinton collaborating with Newson on the move from the stage to the screen.

The production of Newson's next work, MSM (1993), was based on first hand verbatim interviews with men of various ages, backgrounds and sexualities on the subject of cottaging - MSM is the sociological term to describe the act of men having sex with men, irrespective of the sexuality they identify as. The production premiered in Montreal, before opening in the UK at the Nottingham Playhouse. It was co-commissioned by the Royal Court Theatre (London).

1995's Enter Achilles scrutinised the concept of masculinity in modern society. Set in a typical British pub, it looks at how a group of men hide actions and feelings that are deemed unmanly, only for these repressed emotions to manifest themselves in other ways. The work toured initially in the UK and Europe in 1995, and to Australia in 1996 - a revival tour to the US, Canada and Europe followed in 1997, then Russia and Japan in 1998. The stage production was also translated to film, with Newson working with the director Clara van Gool. The film was shown widely at international festivals, and won awards including a Prix Italia and an Emmy Award for the Performing Arts (1997).

A new production of Enter Achilles, in collaboration with Ballet Rambert and Sadler's Wells, staged its world premiere at the Adelaide Festival in March 2020.

=== Bound to Please and The Happiest Day of My Life ===
1997 saw the premiere of Bound to Please, in which Newson directly tackled the dance world. The work featured a love scene between an older woman (Diana Payne-Meyers) and a much younger man. Newson then followed this work with The Happiest Day of My Life (1999), which saw him exploring the themes of love and betrayal, mixing the surreal with the suburban. The elaborate set of a carpeted room sinking into water won Time Out Design of the Year.

=== The Cost of Living ===
In 2000, the Sydney 2000 Cultural Olympiad commissioned Newson to create Can We Afford This, later renamed The Cost of Living. It opened London's Dance Umbrella season, and featured 17 performers investigating how society measures success and how we in turn calculate our own value. Newson was cited as saying the work was about 'what we think we are, and what we think we ought to be'. The touring of the show took DV8 to South East Asia for the first time, and led to several revival projects: a re-staging toured extensively in 2003. In the same year, Tate Modern commissioned a reimagined version of the show Living Costs marking Newson's first site specific work for DV8. The production took scenes from The Cost of Living and blended them with new material, as visitors were taken on a promenade around 7 levels of the Tate Modern, to explore the concepts of high/low art and living through dance, circus, video projection and live music. In 2004, Newson directed the film version of The Cost of Living which was commissioned by Channel 4. It won 18 prizes, including the NOW Audience Choice Award at the Moving Pictures Festival of Toronto, and the Rose d'Or for Arts & Specials in 2005.

=== Just for Show ===
Just for Show (2005 – 06) incorporated virtual technology and allowed Newson to play with ideas around image; where ‘people are often more concerned about looking good, than being good’. Just for Show and subsequent productions To Be Straight With You, Can We Talk About This? and JOHN were presented and co-produced by the National Theatre in London.

=== Move to Verbatim Theatre ===
Newson has stated that after "Just for Show", he began to feel that he could no longer express complex ideas and stories solely through movement. He began to experiment with verbatim text, using interview transcripts to explore how movement and text interrelated. The first production to showcase this was To Be Straight with You (2007), an examination of tolerance/intolerance, homosexuality, culture and religion.

The piece toured widely between 2007 and 2009, and was critically praised for its 'hard hitting' nature, and desire to tackle difficult subject matters head on. Can we Talk About This? (2011-2012), dealt with freedom of speech, censorship and Islam. For this production, Newson drew on existing interviews as well as ones he conducted himself, concerning events such as the Jyllands-Posten Muhammad cartoons controversy, the murder of filmmaker Theo van Gogh, and the burnings of Salman Rushdie's Satanic Verses. The work sought to examine how those events, and others, have influenced multicultural policies, press freedom and artistic censorship. "Can We Talk About This?" was awarded the Helpmann Award (2012) and Production of the Year (2012) by Tanz Magazine (Germany).

Newson's most recent work, again using the methods of verbatim theatre, is JOHN (2014), which follows one man (the eponymous title character, played by performer Hannes Langolf) tracing his criminality, drug use and personal relationships, efforts at rehabilitation and desire to lead an ordinary life. Built on interviews with over 50 men, the work premiered in Vienna (2014), before having an extended run at the Royal National Theatre in London (2014-2015). It was also broadcast to cinemas around the country through the pioneering NT Live programme.

=== 2016 - DV8 On Hold ===
On 12 January 2016, as DV8 celebrated its 30th anniversary, the company announced that artistic director Lloyd Newson was taking time out to reflect about the future. Due to this the company confirmed that the production of new work was to be paused indefinitely.

== Selected awards ==
- OBE for services to contemporary dance (2013)
- UK Critics Circle 100 most influential people in the arts in the last 100 years
- Helpmann Award for 'Best Ballet or Dance Work' (2012)
- Honorary Doctor of Letters (DLitt), Roehamption University (2011)
- Grand Prix de Danse, Syndicat Professionnel de la Critique de Théâtre, Musique et Danse (2009)
- Prix Italia (Performing Arts) (2005)
- Rose d'Or (Arts and Specials Category) (2005)
- International Emmy Award for Performing Arts (1997)
