= 25th International Emmy Awards =

1997 awards ceremony

- Date: November 24, 1997
- Location: New York Hilton Midtown; New York City
- Hosted by: Peter Ustinov

The 25th International Emmy Awards took place on November 24, 1997, at the Hilton Hotel in New York City, New York. The ceremony was hosted by Sir Peter Ustinov and the presenters included the actor Armand Assante, the dancer-choreographer Savion Glover, and the actress Marilu Henner.

== Ceremony ==
The United Kingdom had nine out of 18 nominations for the International Emmy, which honors the best television programs produced and initially aired outside the United States. The winners were among 18 finalists selected from 370 entries for the awards for which only programmes made outside the US are eligible. Four of the six categories were won by British television channels. The BBC won the award for best drama and performing arts, Channel Four won the Emmy for documentary arts and the award for best children's programming. The Emmy for best drama went to Crossing the Floor, a co-production between Trick Production and BBC Two.

Three special awards were presented by the International Academy to television personalities: Dieter Stolte, director general of German television ZDF, was presented with the Emmy Directorate Award; Jac Venza, director of cultural and artistic programming at WNET, was awarded the Founders Award and the first Sir Peter Ustinov Television Scriptwriting Award was presented to Tatyana Murzakova of Russia for her work titled Smile of the Kings. The Namibian Broadcasting Corporation was awarded a special UNICEF award for children's programming.

== Winners ==
=== Best Arts Documentary ===
- Dancing For Dollars: The Bolshoi In Vegas

=== Best Children & Young People Program ===
- Wise Up

=== Best Documentary ===
- Gerrie & Louise

=== Best Drama ===
- Crossing the Floor

=== Best Performing Arts ===
- Enter Achilles

=== Best Popular Arts ===
- Liberg zappt
