= The Cost of Living (2004 film) =

- DVD box art
- Directed by: Lloyd Newson
- Written by: Lloyd Newson
- Based on: The Cost of Living - stage production by DV8 Physical Theatre
- Produced by: Nikki Weston
- Starring: Eddie Kay, David Toole, Vivien Wood, Tanja Liedtke, Rowan Thorpe, Kareena Oates, Tom Hodgson, Jose Maria Alves, Robin Dingemans, Eddie Nixon
- Narrated by: John Avery
- Cinematography: Cameron Barnett
- Edited by: Stuart Briggs
- Music by: Paul Charlier; Jonathan Cooper; Nicholas Hooper
- Production companies: DV8 Films Ltd., Channel 4
- Distributed by: Channel 4 (TV) and Digital Classics DVD
- Release date: 2004
- Running time: 35 min
- Country: United Kingdom
- Language: English
- Budget: £250,000

The Cost of Living is a British physical theatre dance film made in 2004 by DV8 Films Ltd. and Channel 4. It is an adaptation of a stage production by DV8 Physical Theatre. Directed by Lloyd Newson, the founder of DV8 Physical Theatre, the film uses dance, dialogue and physical theatre to tell the story of two street performers and their interaction with other performers in Cromer, a seaside resort town, at the end of the summer season. The film has won a number of awards.

== Cast ==
The cast are:

- Eddie Kay
- David Toole
- Vivien Wood
- Tanja Liedtke
- Rowan Thorpe
- Kareena Oates
- Tom Hodgson
- Jose Maria Alves
- Robin Dingemans
- Eddie Nixon

The characters use the actors' actual first names.

== Narrative ==
The principal characters Dave (David Toole) and Eddie (Eddie Kay) are out of work performers in a seaside resort at the end of the summer. Dave is a double amputee dancer determined to keep his independence in spite of his disability, Eddie is a tough, aggressive character who believes in justice and respect. Through a series of scenes and dances Dave and Eddie encounter and interact with other people living on the fringe of society.

== Reception ==
The film was well received by critics and also won a number of awards at film festivals in various countries.

=== New York Times ===
This is a piece about something, and someone, who is great, about what a profound pleasure it is to encounter greatness, and about what a persistent concern it is that we live in a culture, more specifically a dance culture, that resists such greatness.

Nearly every scene strikes the heart: Eddie's disruption of a brilliantly choreographed six-clown routine; his caustic hostility to gays; Eddie and Dave looking down on a lawn at two women dancers prancing on the green; Dave giving a sexual come-on to an imaginary woman in a pub; Dave verbally harassed by a man with a video camera, followed by a swaying fantasy dance, echoed by the other dancers; Rowan's first encounters with the hula-hooper (Kareena Oates), and their growing romance, all done with silence and hoops; Dave's fluid floor-dance with a woman in a dance studio; and the astonishing final scene, with Eddie and Dave on the beach, speculating about moving to New York and making it on the club circuit.

=== The Guardian ===
There was an unexpected outbreak of artiness on Channel 4 on Sunday night, when DV8 Physical Theatre were given 45 minutes of post-pub screentime to air a mixed-media piece, The Cost of Living. Despite a few annoying moments involving masks, this was a very beautiful mishmash of dance and dialogue set on the north Norfolk coast, featuring a man with no legs who danced on his hands, an aggressive Scottish man who danced like an elegant Bez, and a really awesome routine to Cher's Believe. The piece came to Channel 4 laden with awards, and it's not hard to see why - it was beautiful, provocative, political and erotic. It was probably watched by two people and a dog, but it almost made me want to forgive Channel 4 for Big Brother.

=== Now Magazine ===
This entertaining look at what happens after a group of street performers give up their clown work in a British seaside town makes it clear that live or on celluloid, DV8 are one of the sharpest dance troupes around.

The movement arises out of character and situation, whether it’s a guy in a nightclub whose nervous tics take over his body, or a woman fighting off a group of boys with a hoola hoop.

It’s an ensemble piece, but the film’s most memorable moments involve David Toole, a legless dancer who seduces us in a bar, fights off a bigot, gets to dance with a ballerina and shares the film’s extraordinary final image.

=== Awards ===
- NOW Audience Choice Award, Moving Pictures Festival 2004, Toronto
- Paula Citron Award, Moving Pictures Festival 2004, Toronto
- Best of VideoDance Audience Award, VideoDance 2004, Athens
- Jury Prize, Dance on Camera Festival 2005, New York. - The prize citation said: "With astonishing originality and surprising invention, The Cost of Living dazzles the mind and eye with its seamless integration of the kinetic, the dramatic, use of both language and dialogue, creation of colorfully unforgettable characters, and assured cinematic instincts and technique."
- Audience Choice Award, Festival of Dance Film for the Camera 2005, Brasilia
- Sette Jury Prize, International Festival of Films on Art 2005, Montreal
- Arts & Specials, Rose d'Or 2005, Lucerne
- Best Camera Re-work, IMZ Dance Screen 2005, Brighton
- Audience Award, Cinedans 2005, Amsterdam
- TV Performing Arts, Prix Italia 2005, Milan
- Time Out Live Award for Outstanding Achievement in Dance 2006, London
- Best of Festival, Picture This Film Festival 2006, Calgary
- Choreography Media Honors Award, Dance Camera West 2007, Los Angeles
- All About Dance Award, Milano Doc Festival 2007, Milan
- Special Mention, Look & Roll Festival 2008, Basel
- Special Merit Award, Documentary and Disability Festival 2009, Athens
- Grand Prix RTBF-EOP!, EOP! International Film Festival 2011, Namur, Belgium
- Audience Award/Pro Faito Award, Faito DOC Film Festival 2012, Italy
