= Disturbance (Test Dept. album) =

Studio album by Test Dept
- Released: 1 March 2019
- Length: 45:41
- Label: One Little Indian

Professional ratings
Aggregate scores
Source	Rating
Metacritic	71/100
Review scores
Source	Rating
AllMusic	3.5/5 stars

Disturbance is a studio album by English band Test Dept. It was released in March 2019 under One Little Indian Records. It is the band's first album release in 20 years.

== Track listing ==
No.	Title	Length
1.	"Speak Truth to Power"	6:22
2.	"Landlord"	4:41
3.	"Debris"	4:33
4.	"Full Spectrum Dominance"	7:27
5.	"Information Scare"	4:50
6.	"Gatekeeper"	5:32
7.	"GBH84"	4:21
8.	"Two Flames Burn"	7:55
