= Dave Toole =

British dancer and actor (1964–2020)

Dave Toole OBE
- Born: 31 July 1964; Leeds, England
- Died: 16 October 2020 (aged 56)
- Occupations: dancer, actor
- Known for: performance in opening ceremony of the 2012 Summer Paralympics

Dave Toole OBE (31 July 1964 – 16 October 2020) was a British dancer and actor. He was well known for his performance in the opening ceremony of the 2012 Summer Paralympics. He died on 16 October 2020 at the age of 56.

== Biography ==
Toole was born with sacral agenesis. His lower spine and legs had not developed properly during gestation and his legs were amputated when he was around 18 months old.

== Career ==
After working at a post office for nearly nine years, he shifted to London and pursued his career as a performance dancer in 1993 with the Candoco Dance Company. He also later worked with the Royal Shakespeare Company and then worked with Stopgap Dance Company for over ten years. He also had a stint with the DV8 Physical Theatre. He also acted in a few films including Amazing Grace and The Tango Lesson. His most notable performance came during the opening ceremony of the 2012 Summer Paralympics in London where he delivered ballet persuaded solo dance performance as he was hoisted up into the air around 22m above the ballet dance floor. The performance was well received and highly appreciated by the viewers. He also performed in 2012 International Dance Festival in Birmingham in collaboration. In 2013, he also performed in a show titled The Johnny Eck and Dave Toole where he narrated the story of the actor Johnny Eck of the 1930s.

He was appointed Officer of the Order of the British Empire (OBE) in the 2020 New Year Honours for services to dance and people with disabilities.
