= Test Dept =

British industrial music group

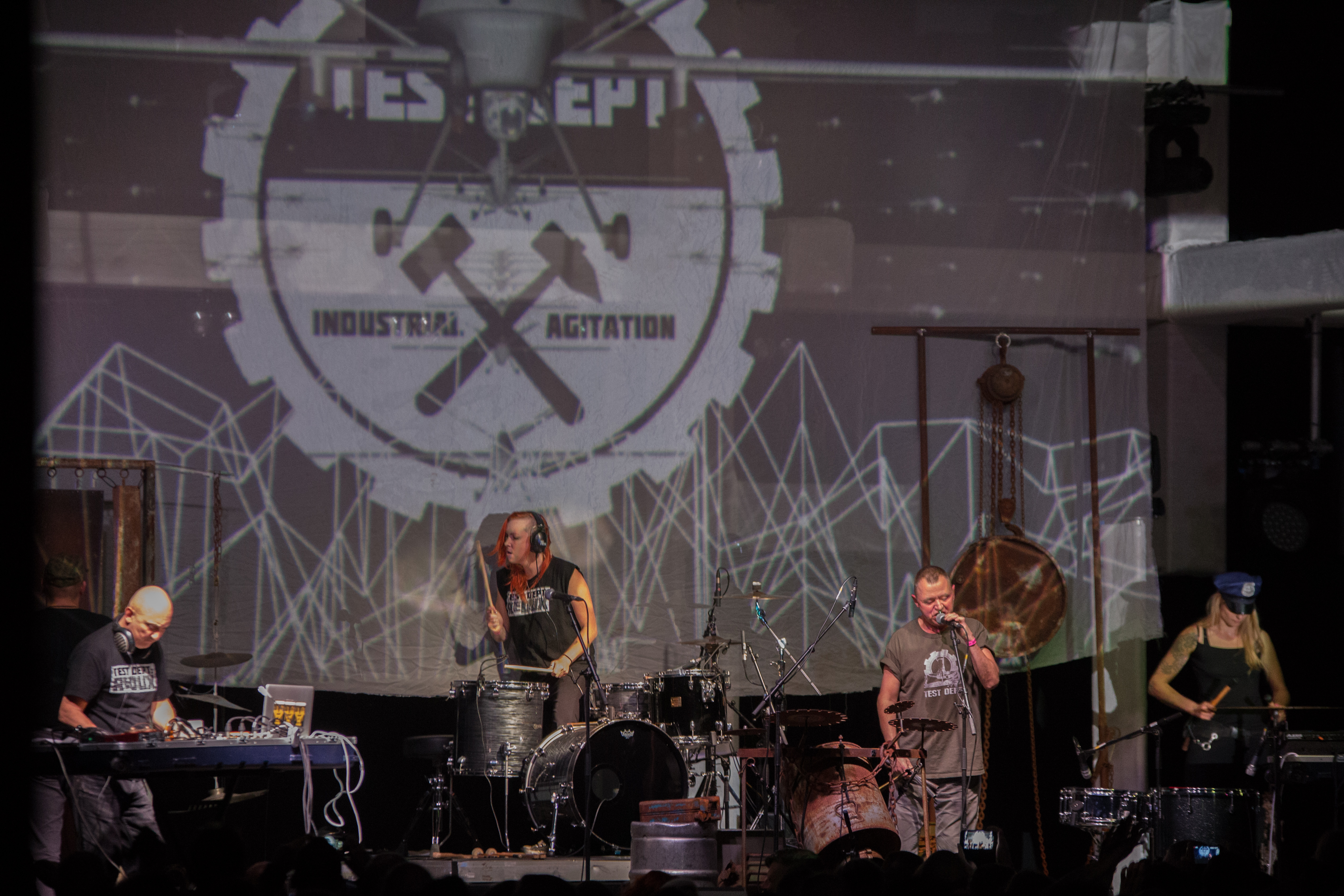
- Maschinenfest 2016

Background information
- Also known as: T.D.A.
- Origin: New Cross, London, England
- Genre: Industrial
- Years active: 1981–1997, 2016–present
- Labels: Some Bizzare Records; Sub Rosa; KK; PIAS/Wax Trax!
- Members: Graham Cunnington; Paul Jamrozy
- Past members: Jonathan Toby Burdon; Paul Hines; Angus Farquhar; Alistair Adams; Neil Starr; John Eacott; Andy Cowton; Tony Cudlip; David Coulter; Gus Ferguson; Martin King

Test Dept, sometimes credited as Test Department, is a British industrial music group from London, England, that was one of the most important and influential early industrial music acts. Their approach was marked by the use of "found" material, re-constructed to better serve their purpose, of making "more" with "less".

== History ==
The group formed in the London suburb of New Cross in 1981. The core members of the group were Graham Cunnington, Paul Jamrozy, Jonathan Toby Burdon, Paul Hines and Angus Farquhar. Other members who played with the group at various times included Alistair Adams, Neil Starr, John Eacott, Andy Cowton, Tony Cudlip, David Coulter, Liz Ranken, Gus Ferguson, Martin King, Simon Hyde, Russell MacDonald and KatieJane Garside. Comedian Vic Reeves played bass in an early incarnation of the band. The band signed to Some Bizzare Records, a label connected to acts like Depeche Mode, Soft Cell, The The, Cabaret Voltaire, PTV, Foetus, and Swans. The slides and film for Test Dept multi-media events were made by visual director Brett Turnbull.

Their discography spans a wide variety of influences and styles, including a collaboration with the South Wales Striking Miners Choir in support of the miners' strike of 1984. They were particularly notable for complex and powerful percussion, as well as high-energy live performances. Like the German band Einstürzende Neubauten, another Some Bizzare label signing with whom they are often compared, Test Dept used unconventional instruments such as scrap metal and industrial machinery as sound sources; however, Test Dept's use of these objects was far more rhythmic than was Neubauten's, and was often accompanied by film and slide shows. The group were noted for large-scale events in unusual site-specific locations, such as Bishopsbrige Maintenance depot at Paddington station, Arch 69 and Titan Arch near Waterloo station, Cannon Street station, Stirling Castle and the disused St Rollox Railway Works in Glasgow. Test Dept. were also active in the 1980s underground tape scene with many of their earliest releases being available only on cassette.

The band's album The Unacceptable Face of Freedom was praised by a music reviewer for The New York Times, claiming the album was notable for a "sophisticated use of sound-collage techniques and the helter-skelter momentum of its cyclical rhythms".

In the 1990s, the band's music became less industrial and took on many of the properties of techno. The band's political stance was energised by the passing of the Criminal Justice and Public Order Act 1994.

The band split up in 1997, but its former members have continued to work in the fields of art and culture. Angus Farquhar helped re-establish the ancient Gaelic Beltane Fire Festival, held yearly on the night before/morning of the first of May on Edinburgh's Calton Hill. Farquhar also formed NVA, an innovative theatre company specialising in large-scale site-specific events. Cunnington, who suffers from chronic rheumatoid arthritis, produced a one-man show in 1996 called Pain, recounting his experiences as a sufferer from this condition. Jamrozy works with the performance group C.3.3. Their album, Ballad of Reading Gaol - The Cacophonietta, was released on Cold Spring Records. Gus Ferguson teaches music to orphans in Kathmandu, and young Buddhist monks in Northern India.

The core of the original group re-emerged in 2014 to engage with the current cultural and political climate, exploring new ways of expression in a strategic programme of actions. Their large scale film installation 'DS30' utilised Dunston Staiths, an industrial landmark on the River Tyne in Gateshead and was commissioned by AV Festival to commemorate the 30th Anniversary of the UK Miners' strike. The DS30 film from the event then toured former mining community areas in the UK. They subsequently released Total State Machine, a large book documenting their history, via PC Press Publishing in 2015.

The group began playing again in 2014 as Test Dept: Redux the current line up includes Zel Kaute, David Altweger, Charles Poulet, and scales up with additional performers for large scale events these include Ashley Davies, Rob Lewis, Alex Nym and Franziska Anna Faust. Further Test Dept: Redux gigs followed in 2016, including the London gig supported by electro-punks Feral Five. In 2017, the band organized a three day festival titled Assembly of Disturbance, featuring an exhibition of TD manifestos and films Culture is Not a Luxury, Malcom Poynter's sculpture 'Horseman of the Apocalypse', speakers, DJs and other contemporary performers, these included a new TD project - 'Prolekult', with kinetic sculpture from 'autoPneumatix' and sub sonic frequencies from 'Disinformation'. They released a new album, Disturbance as Test Dept, along with their entire back catalogue on the One Little Independent Records label in 2018.

== Discography ==
=== Albums ===
- Ecstacy Under Duress – 1984
- Beating the Retreat (Some Bizzare Records) – 1984
- Shoulder to Shoulder (with South Wales Striking Miners' Choir) Some Bizzare Records – 1985 (#11 UK Indie)
- Atonal & Hamburg, Live – 1985
- The Unacceptable Face of Freedom (Some Bizzare Records) – 1986 (#2 UK Indie)
- A Good Night Out – Some Bizzare Records 1987 (#15 UK Indie)
- Terra Firma – 1988
- Materia Prima – 1989
- Gododdin (with Brith Gof) – 1989
- Pax Britannica – 1991
- Proven in Action (Live 1990) – 1991
- Totality – 1995
- Legacy [1990–1993]: The Singles Plus More – 1995
- Tactics for Evolution – 1997
- Disturbance – 2019
- Industrial Overture – 2026
