= Gerrie & Louise =

- Directed by: Sturla Gunnarsson
- Screenplay by: Sturla Gunnarsson; Steven Silver; Barry Stevens
- Cinematography: Kirk Tougas
- Production companies: Eurasia Motion Pictures; Blackstock Pictures Inc.
- Release date: 1997
- Running time: 75 minutes
- Country: Canada
- Language: English

Gerrie & Louise is a 1997 Canadian documentary film directed by Sturla Gunnarsson. The film examines post-apartheid South Africa through the lens of Gerrie Hugo, a former officer in the South African Defence Force who fell in love with and married Louise Flanagan, a journalist investigating the SADF's role in various controversial events during the apartheid era.

The film had a theatrical screening at the 1997 Toronto International Film Festival, but was distributed primarily as a CBC Television broadcast.

== Awards ==
Year	Award	Category	Result
1997	25th International Emmy Awards	Best Documentary	Won
1998	Gemini Awards	Best Documentary Program	Won
1998	Writers Guild of Canada	WGC Award	Won
