= DV8 Physical Theatre =

Theatre company in the UK

- Formation: 1986
- Founders: Lloyd Newson; Michelle Richecoeur; Nigel Charnock
- Location: Artsadmin
- Region served: UK and Internationally
- Artistic Director: Lloyd Newson
- Website: Official Website

DV8 Physical Theatre (or Dance and Video 8) is a physical theatre company based at Artsadmin in London, United Kingdom. It was officially founded in 1986 by Lloyd Newson (1986 - 2022), Michelle Richecoeur (1986–1988) and Nigel Charnock (1986–1989, 1992). Lloyd Newson led the company as choreographer and artistic director from its inception, apart from the production My Sex, Our Dance (1986), which was co-created and performed with Nigel Charnock. DV8 officially ended in April 2022 when Lloyd Newson announced his retirement via the company web page.

DV8's work is characterised by the desire to communicate ideas and feelings clearly with a focus on socio-political issues. The work challenges the limitations of dance by using any means necessary to find the most appropriate way to say something, thereby incorporating elements of theatre, dance, film, and, increasingly, text. DV8 toured work in the UK and to 28 countries worldwide, and received 55 national and international awards.

== History ==
=== Foundation and early work ===
Lloyd Newson founded DV8 Physical Theatre in 1986 in response to his frustration with the lack of subject matter in contemporary dance. He felt audiences were being ‘conned about the depth’ of (much) contemporary dance, which he saw as generally superficial; obsessed with 'aesthetics over content'. The first work Newson produced with the new company was made in partnership with Nigel Charnock, and was titled My Sex, Our Dance (1986); it tackled the emergence of AIDS and investigated the idea of trust, both emotionally and physically, between two gay men. This was followed by Deep End (1987), in which dancer Liz Ranken joined Newson, Richecoeur and Charnock as a performer, and Elemen T(H)ree Sex (1987): works which focused on heterosexual relationships. All three works toured the UK, and My Sex, Our Dance and Deep End were also performed in New York as part of the Next Wave Festival (held at the Brooklyn Academy of Music) in 1988.

The next work for the company was My Body, Your Body (1987), which explored the psychology of women who seek out relationships with abusive men. It was based on an audio recording of a close female friend of Newson's and the book, Women Who Love Too Much by Robin Norwood. The production toured the UK in 1987 and featured Wendy Houstoun, who later played the lead role in If Only… (1990) and Strange Fish (1992).

In 1988, Dead Dreams of Monochrome Men was created for the stage and, two years later, adapted for film – the first of several made by the company. The production drew inspiration from the book, Killing for Company, about serial killer Dennis Nilsen. It garnered numerous awards for DV8, including the Time Out Dance Award and the Evening Standard Ballet Award, both in 1989. In 1990, film-director David Hinton, commissioned by the South Bank Show (ITV), collaborated with Newson to adapt the stage production for television.

=== 1990–2000 ===
After Dead Dreams of Monochrome Men, Newson began to develop a more poetic style, involving increasingly complex sets. He stated at the time that he was "fatigued by the bruising physicality that marked DV8’s work from 1986–1989. The first of these works was If Only… (1990), which won the Golden Pegasus Award at the Melbourne International Festival (1990). Strange Fish (1992) followed, featuring Wendy Houstoun alongside Nigel Charnock and singer Melanie Pappenheim. Again, it was a critical success: the stage production won the London Dance & Performance Award (1992) and was adapted for a BBC film the same year, later winning the company’s first Prix Italia.

Throughout the 1990s, DV8 continued to produce work that was critically well received and popular with audiences. The BBC film version of Enter Achilles (1996) won a Prix Italia and an International Emmy Award in 1997, while The Happiest Day of My Life (1999) won the Time Out Set Design of the Year.

In 2000, the Sydney Cultural Olympiad commissioned Can We Afford This, later renamed The Cost of Living. It went on to open London’s Dance Umbrella season, and toured to Hong Kong. In 2004, the work was adapted into an award winning film, directed by Newson, and reworked with extra scenes as a site-specific production, Living Costs (2003), commissioned by and for London’s Tate Modern contemporary art gallery.

=== 2004 onwards ===
In 2004-5, DV8 created Just for Show, the first of co-productions with the National Theatre (London). This was a significant new relationship in terms of the company’s cross-genre position between increasingly arbitrary categories of "dance" and "theatre".

The next production, To Be Straight With You (2007), marked a move by Newson into verbatim theatre – setting minutely detailed movement to the real (edited) words of real people. To create the script, 85 people of varying ethnicities and sexuality were interviewed by Newson and his researcher, Anshu Rastogi, about their experiences and views concerning religion, culture and homosexuality.

Can We Talk About This? (2011–12), a second verbatim production, dealt with freedom of speech, censorship and Islam. It drew on existing interviews as well as those conducted by Newson himself, and involved people associated with the burning of author Salman Rushdie's Satanic Verses and associates of film-maker Theo van Gogh, who was murdered by Dutch Islamist, Mohammed Bouyeri. Can We Talk About This? won a Helpmann Award (Australia, 2012), and was named Tanz Magazine's Production of the Year (Germany, 2012).

DV8's work, JOHN (2014) follows the life-story of a man, the eponymous title character, played by Hannes Langolf. It traces his criminality, drug use, personal relationships, efforts at rehabilitation and desire to lead an ordinary life. Again co-produced with the National Theatre, it was broadcast to cinemas worldwide through the NT Live programme.

On 12 January 2016, the company announced that artistic director Lloyd Newson was taking time out to reflect about the future. Due to this the company confirmed that the production of new work was to be paused indefinitely.

A new production of Enter Achilles, created by Newson and co-produced with Ballet Rambert and Sadler's Wells, staged its world premiere at the Adelaide Festival in March 2020.

== Style ==
DV8's work is characterised by a desire to take risks, to question people's attitudes and beliefs, to dissolve barriers that separate art forms, and ultimately to communicate ideas and feelings clearly and unpretentiously. The company frequently addresses pertinent social topics, such as freedom of speech, human rights, multiculturalism, tolerance/intolerance, gender roles, sexual identity and social class, as well as personal issues.

DV8's work seeks to use the most appropriate means available to serve its mission. Thus, its productions incorporate elements of dance, naturalistic movement, video, circus skills and more recently, verbatim text.

== Funding and Production ==
DV8 Physical Theatre received funding through Arts Council England's National Portfolio programme, as well as occasional project support from the British Council. It toured work extensively in the UK and Europe, and further afield to Australia, the US, Hong Kong, Korea and Taiwan. Many of its long-term co-production partners were theatres and festivals from across the world. It was an Artsadmin associate company, and also a member of the ITC, Dance UK and IETM. Newson often stated that the company is motivated by artistic inspiration and creative need, rather than financial, organisational and touring demands.

== Works ==
It produced 18 works for the stage, the majority of which toured internationally, and four award-winning films adapted from stage performances.

=== Stage ===
- My Sex, Our Dance, 1986 – commissioned by the Battersea Arts Centre, and supported by a grant from Camden Borough Council.
- Deep End, 1987 – commissioned by John Ashford for The Place Theatre, London
- Elemen T(h)ree Sex, 1987 – commissioned by Yorkshire Arts, and funded by Yorkshire & Humberside Arts Board
- My Body, Your Body, 1987 – co-produced by Dance Umbrella and the London Borough of Camden
- Dead Dreams of Monochrome Men, 1988 – commissioned by the Third Eye Centre, Glasgow
- If Only, 1990 – co-produced by The Festival Unit – Glasgow City of Culture 1990, Festival d'Eté de Seine Maritime (Rouen) and The South Bank Centre (London)
- Strange Fish, 1992 – commissioned by EXPO 92 (Seville), Britain at EXPO, and co-produced with the National Arts Centre, Ottawa
- MSM, 1993 – co-produced by the Royal Court Theatre and Nottingham Playhouse
- Enter Achilles, 1995 – co-produced by Wiener Festwochen and the Royal Festival Hall with Dance Umbrella, with a contribution from Bayerische Staatsoper/Labor, Bayerische Staatsschauspiel/Marstall.
- Bound to Please, 1997 – co-produced by Springdance Festival, Théâtre de la Ville, Cambridge Arts Theatre, the Royal Festival Hall, the Centre National de Danse Contemporaine d'Angers l'Esquisse
- The Happiest Day of My Life, 1999 – co-produced by the Royal Festival Hall; Théâtre de la Ville, Bayerisches Staatsschauspiel/Marstall, München, Léonard de Vinci, opéra de Rouen, Kulturhus Åarhus, Julidans Festival/Stadsschouwburg Amsterdam and Internationales Sommertheater Festival Hamburg
- Can We Afford This/The Cost of Living, 2000 – commissioned by Sydney 2000 Olympic Arts Festival and co-produced in London by DV8 and The Royal Festival Hall in association with Dance Umbrella
- Living Costs (promenade performance), 2003 – commissioned by the Tate
- The Cost of Living, 2003 – co-produced by Théâtre de la Ville and the Festival d'Automne; Romaeuropa Festival; Julidans Festival / Stadsschouwburg Amsterdam; PACT Zollverein / Choreographisches Zentrum NRW and Hebbel Theater in Berlin
- Just For Show, 2005 – co-produced by Romaeuropa Festival and Accademia Filarmonica, Rome; National Theatre, London; Théâtre de la Ville and the Festival d'Automne, Paris; spielzeiteuropa/Berliner Festspiele, Berlin
- To Be Straight With You, 2008 – co-produced by spielzeit'europa/Berliner Festspiele, National Theatre, London, Maison des Arts de Creteil and Festival D'Automne, Paris.
- Can We Talk About This?, 2011 – co-produced with Théâtre de la Ville and Festival d'Automne, Paris, National Theatre, London and Dansens Hus Stockholm.
- John, 2014 – co-produced by the National Theatre, London, Biennale de la Danse de Lyon, La Villette, Paris, Théâtre de la Ville and Festival d'Automne Paris, Dansens Hus Stockholm and Dansens Hus Oslo.

=== Films ===
Film adaptations of DV8's theatrical productions, except Dead Dreams of Monochrome Men, were produced by DV8 Films Ltd.

- Dead Dreams of Monochrome Men, 1989, commissioned by LWT
- Strange Fish, 1992, commissioned by the BBC
- Enter Achilles, 1995, commissioned by the BBC
- The Cost of Living, 2004, commissioned by Channel 4
