= Enter Achilles =

Enter Achilles is a performance created by the dance and theatre company DV8 Physical Theatre and directed by Lloyd Newson. First performed on 7 June 1995 at Vienna Festwochen in Vienna, Austria, the piece initially toured around the UK and Europe in 1995, before moving to Australia in early 1996. The performance was later revived and toured in 1997, visiting Europe and North America, and again in 1998, where it toured Europe and Japan.

An award-winning film version was released in 1996.

It was revived in a new production in 2020, premiering at the Adelaide Festival.

== Description ==
The performance, with a run time of 75 minutes, explores masculinity and our perception of the stereotypical "bloke". Set in a dark, dusty, British pub, a group of men gather around the blasting jukebox, a pint in one hand and a cigarette in the other. Movement- and dance-based, this physical theatre performance uncovers the men's insecurities and vulnerability. The concept of gender is investigated through the understanding of what we deem as "unmanly" and this is closely represented through the gestures, action and movement of the performers, a technique which is often associated with the work of Newson and DV8. Looking at conformity regarding male relationships, friendships and identity the performance attempts to realise the struggle of being a "real" man. The piece is an exploration, concentrating on the complications of existence within a man's world.

== Stage performances ==
After receiving its world premiere in Vienna in 1995, the piece went on to tour extensively, and was critically acclaimed, with Rupert Christiansen in the Observer stating that it was "heartening to find DV8 blazing a fresh, dangerous trail". It toured Europe, North America and Japan.

A new production, in collaboration with Ballet Rambert and Sadler's Wells, staged its world premiere at the Adelaide Festival in March 2020.

== Film ==
In 1995, Newson collaborated with the director Clara Van Gool to adapt the stage piece for film. The resulting piece, which was screened at numerous film festivals around the world, received numerous awards, including an Emmy Award for the Performing Arts in 1997.
