= Beltane Fire Festival =

Annual participatory arts event and ritual in Edinburgh

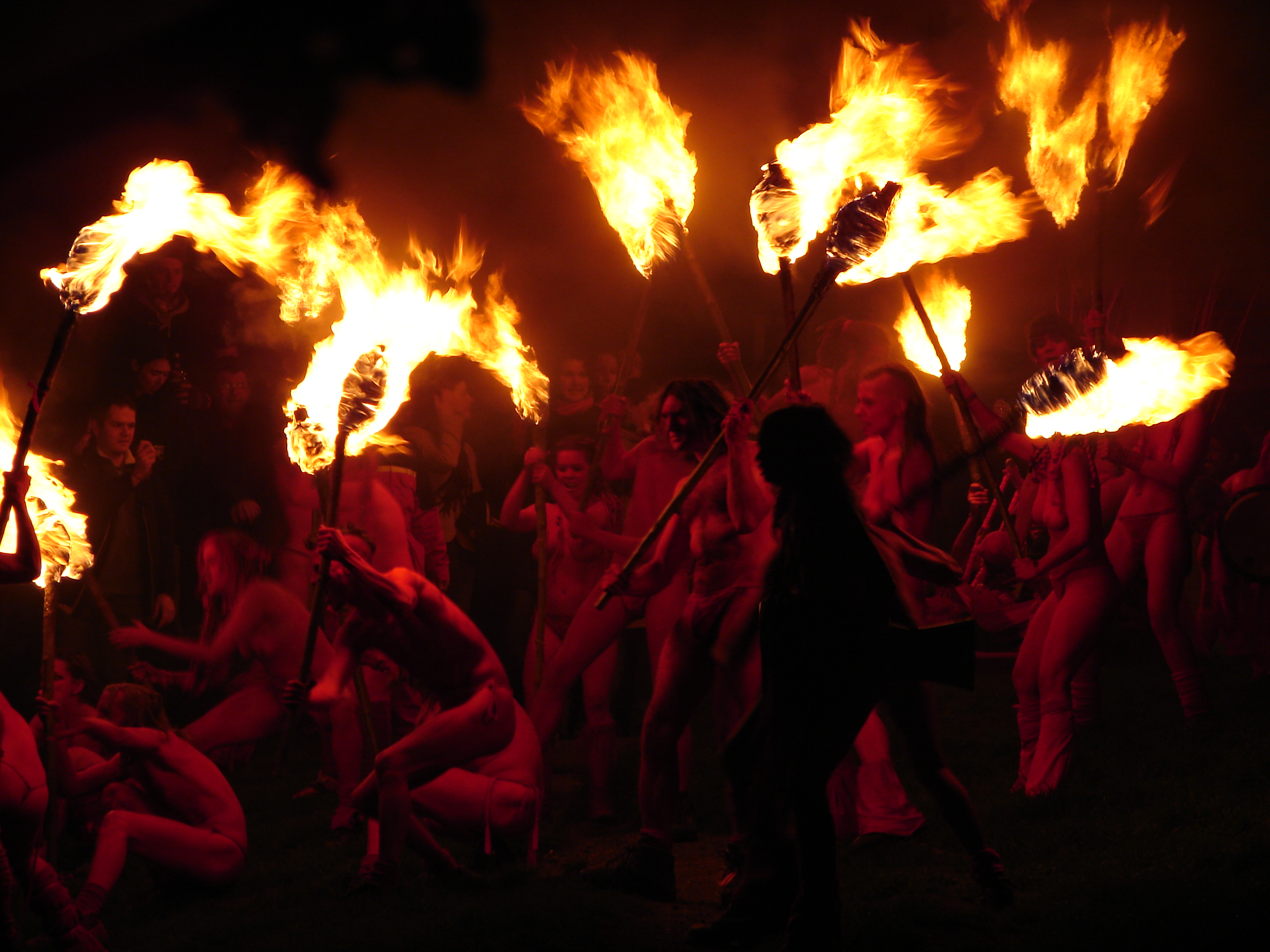
Beltane Fire Festival Red Men

Beltane Fire Festival is an annual participatory arts event and ritual, held on 30 April on Calton Hill in Edinburgh.

== Historical background ==
The modern Beltane Fire Festival is inspired by the ancient Gaelic festival of Beltane which began on the evening before 1 May and marked the beginning of summer. The modern festival was started in 1988 by a small group of enthusiasts including the musical collective Test Dept, with academic support from the School of Scottish Studies at the University of Edinburgh. Since then the festival has grown, and now involves over 300 voluntary collaborators and performers with available tickets often selling out.

While the festival draws on a variety of historical, mythological and literary influences, the organisers do not claim it to be anything other than a modern celebration of Beltane, evolving with its participants.

== Modern festival ==
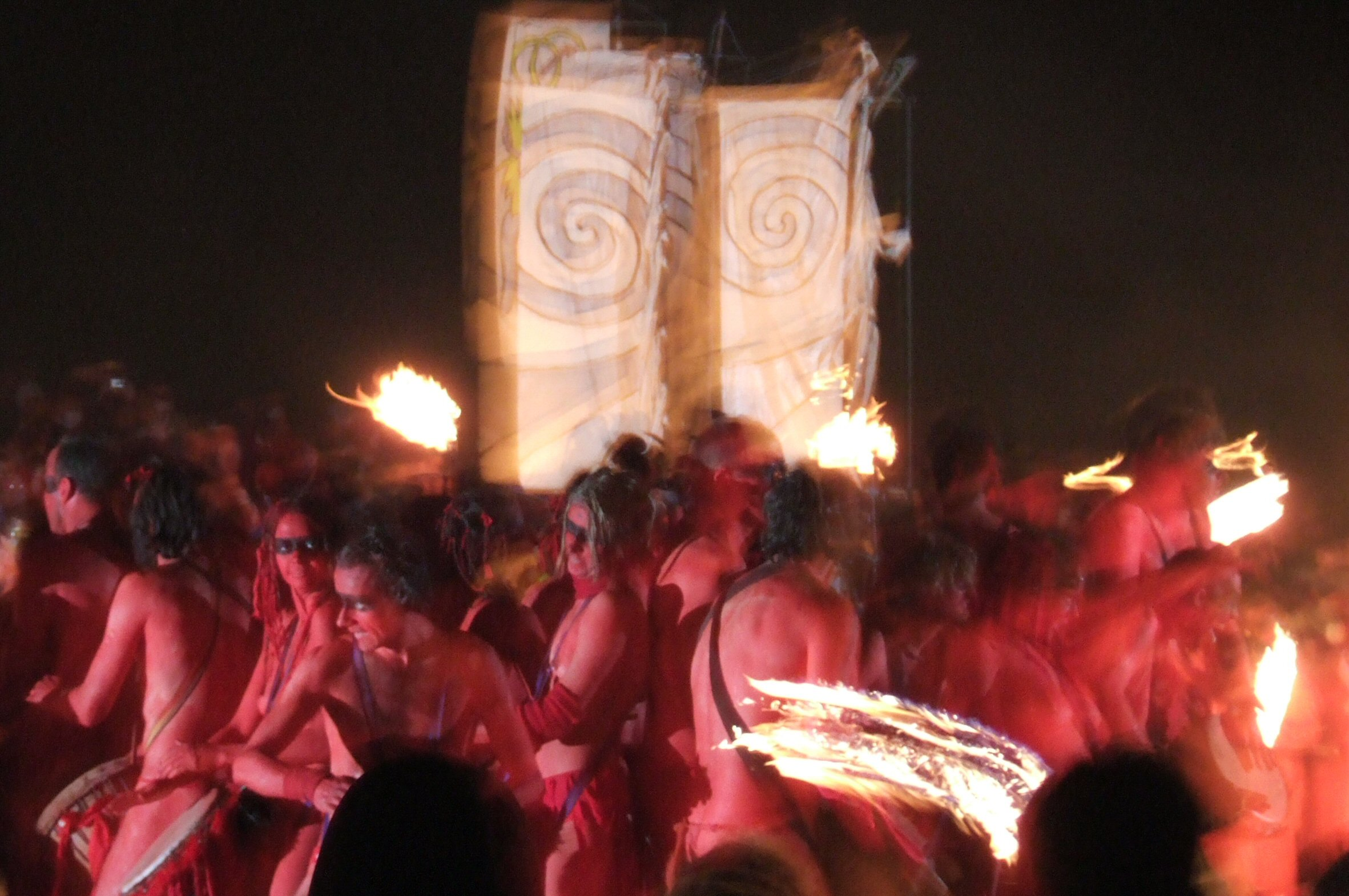
Fire festival dancers, 2006

The current Beltane was started in 1988 by a small group of enthusiasts including Angus Farquhar of the musical collective Test Dept., choreographer Lindsay John, and dancers from Laban, as well as the Gaelic ethnologist Margaret Bennett (writer) and other academics from the School of Scottish Studies at the University of Edinburgh. The event was intended as a celebration of traditional rituals as a local manifestation of an international spirit. Originally intended to take place on Arthur's Seat, the home of earlier Edinburgh Beltane celebrations, for practical reasons the location was moved to Calton Hill. Choreography, iconography and performance were moulded by the originators' research into historical accounts of Beltane and their own influences (e.g. Test Department's drumming, Trinidadian carnival, and ritual dance and performance).

The Beltane Fire Society, a registered charity which runs the festival, is managed by a democratically elected voluntary committee, and all the performers are volunteers who either join by word of mouth or by attending one of the advertised open meetings held early in the year. Senior performers and artists in the society help others through workshops with aspects of event production, prop construction, character performance techniques, team building, percussion skills and the health and safety considerations involved. The society has also held fundraising art and music events and has held a 'mini-Beltane' at a local AIDS Hospice, Milestone House.

As a community event, each year the performance has evolved as new people bring their own influences and directions. The core narrative remains by and large the same though additional elements have been added over time for theatrical, ritual, and practical reasons. Originally an event with a core of a dozen performers and a few hundred audience, the event has grown to several hundred performers and over ten thousand audience. Key characters within the performance are maintained, though reinterpreted by their performers, and additional participants incorporated each year.

Originally, the festival was free and only lightly stewarded; however, as the event has grown in popularity, due to the capacity of the hill, funding requirements, and Edinburgh Council requests, the festival has in recent years moved to being a ticketed event.

== Gallery of Beltane photographs ==
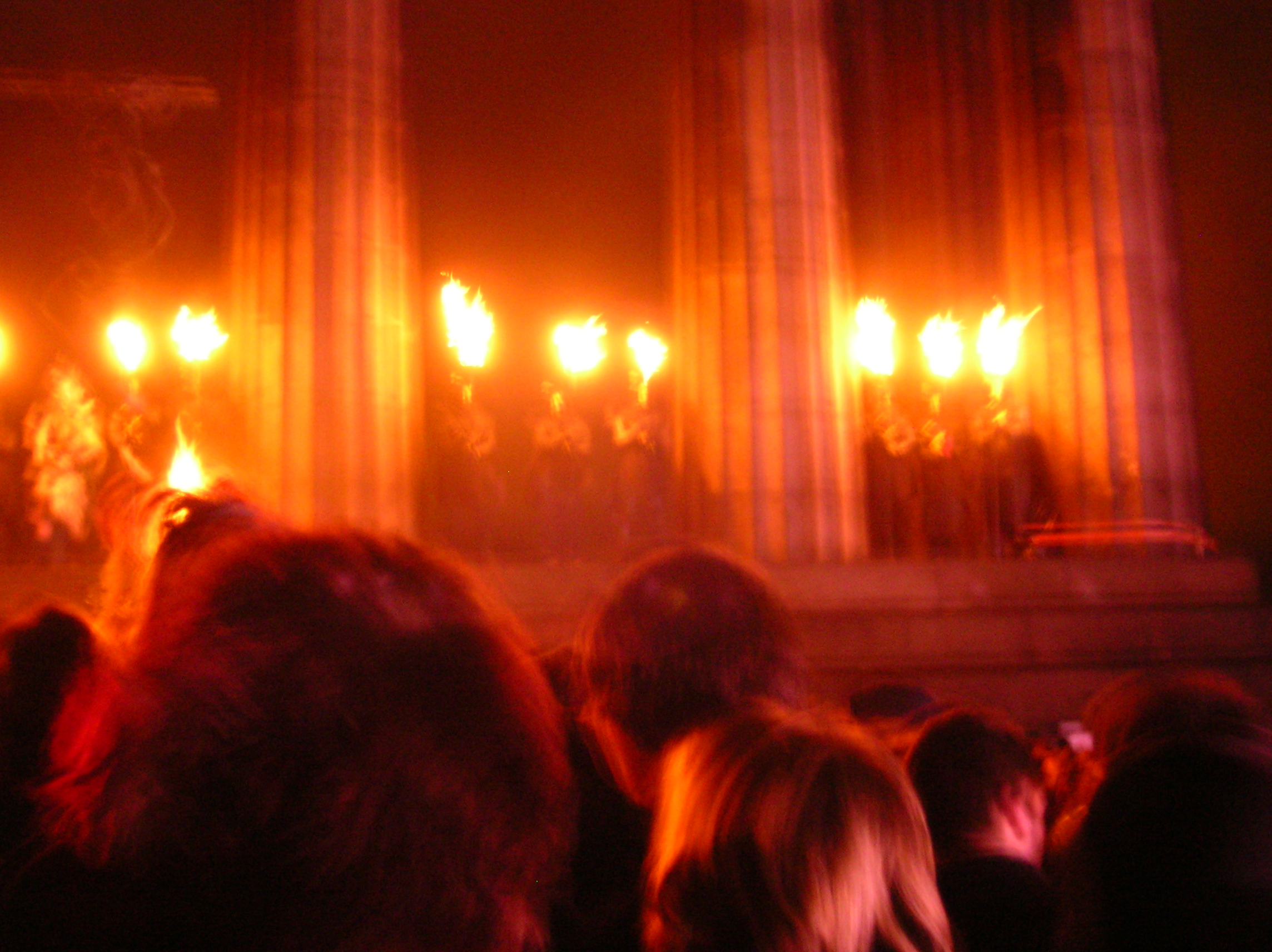
The need-fire is created, and from it the torches lit

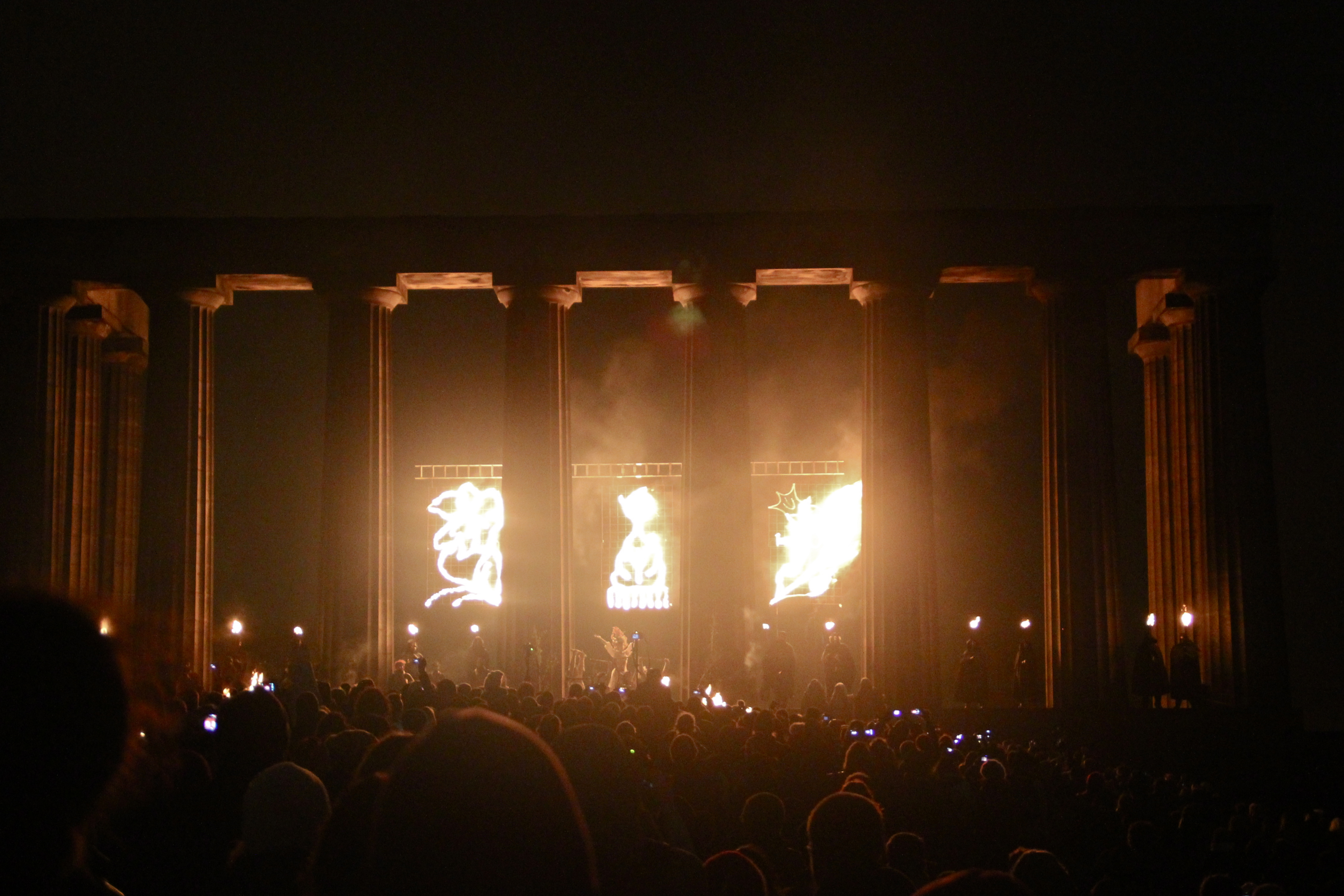
The May Queen enters with her handmaidens

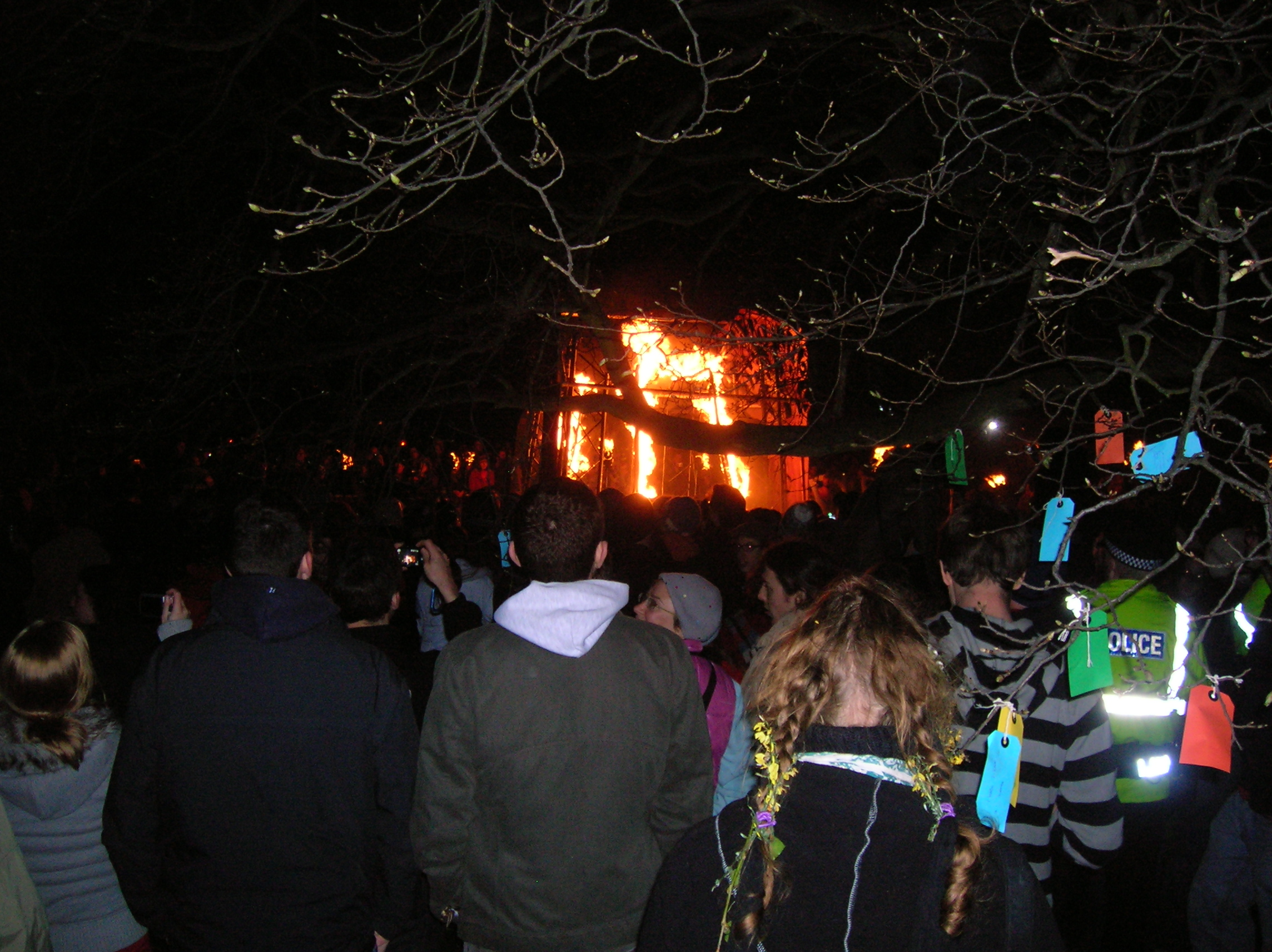
The procession passes under Fire Arch

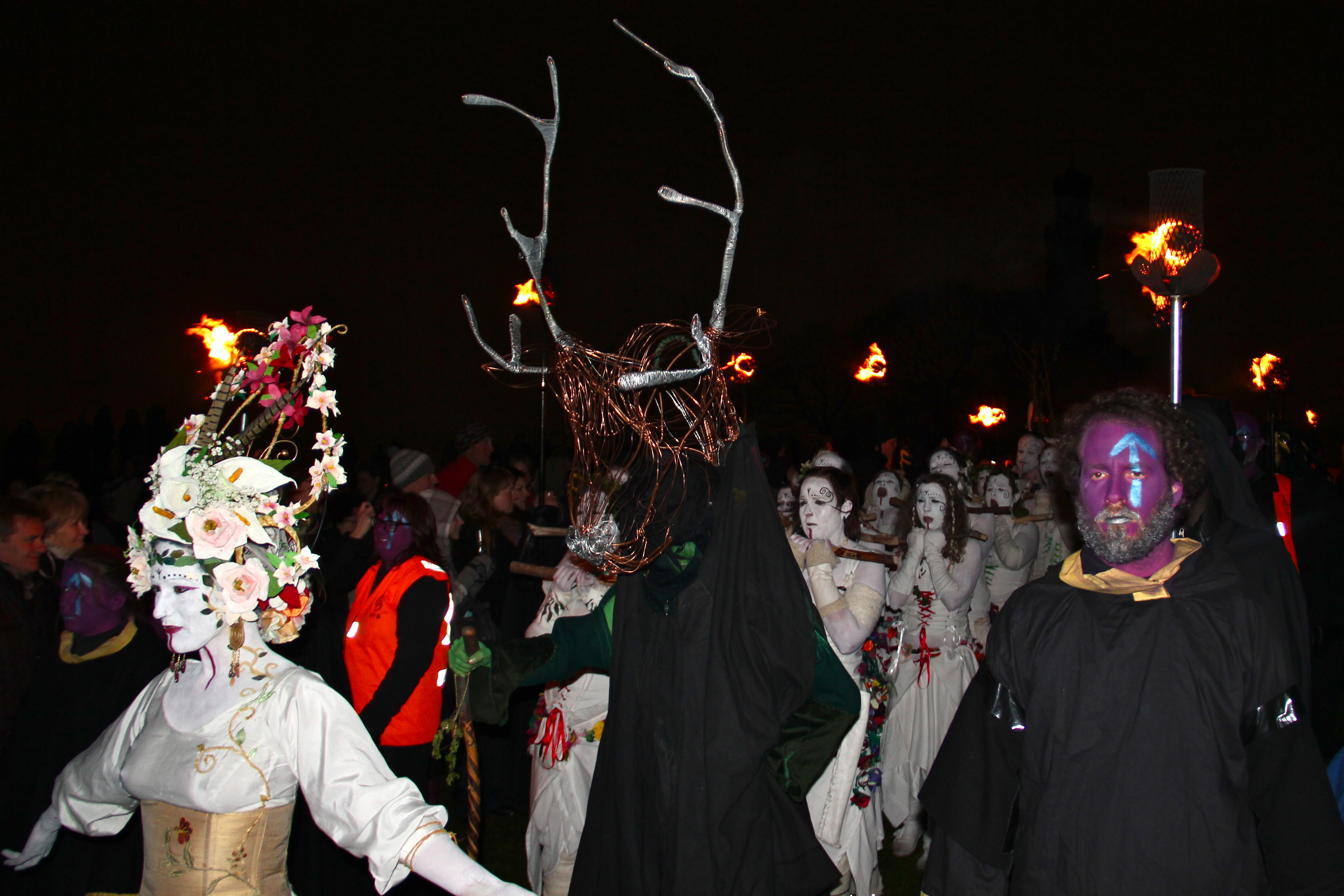
The May Queen leads the procession

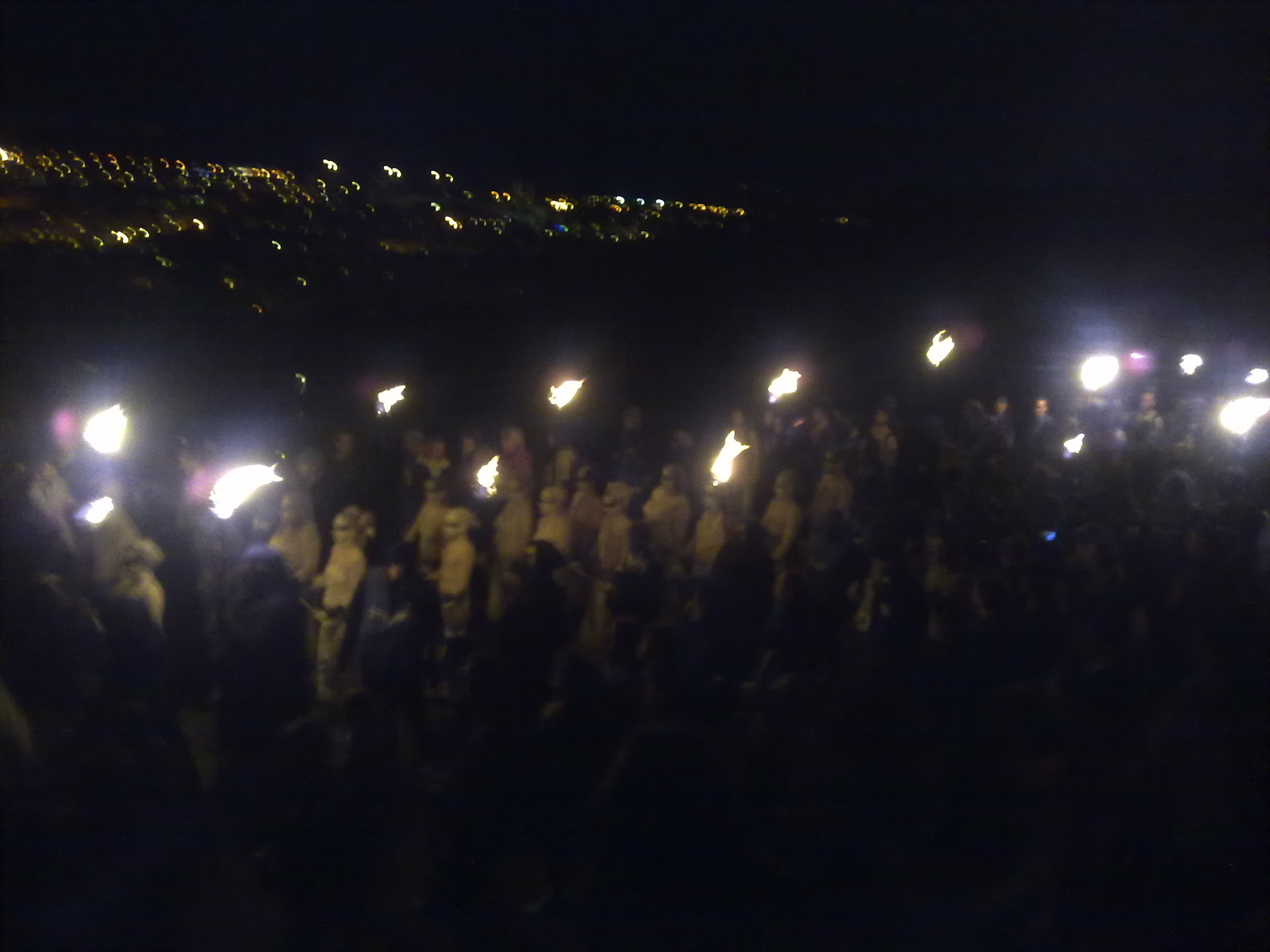
The White Women march on through the crowds

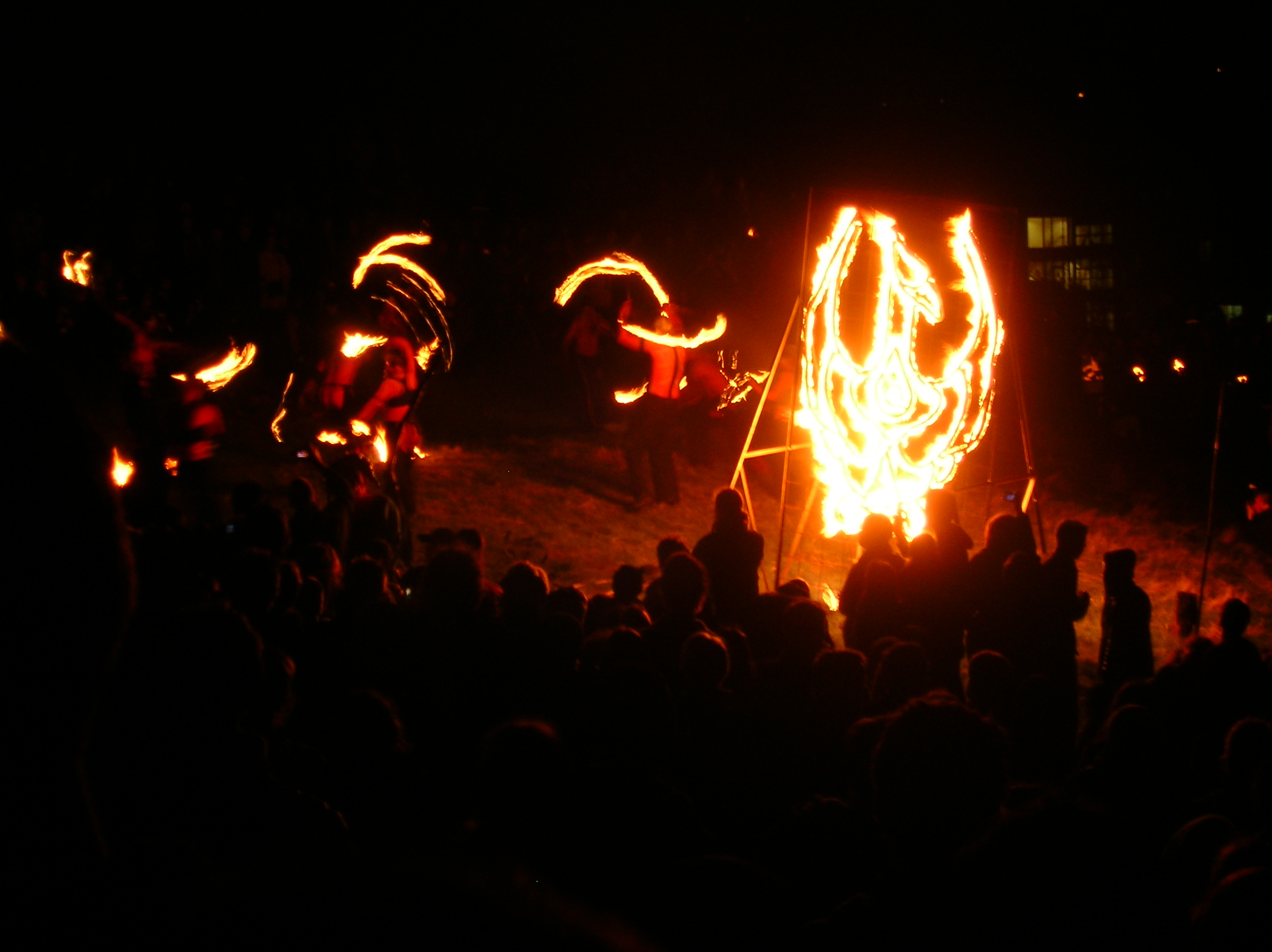
The burning Phoenix and fire-twirling sprites

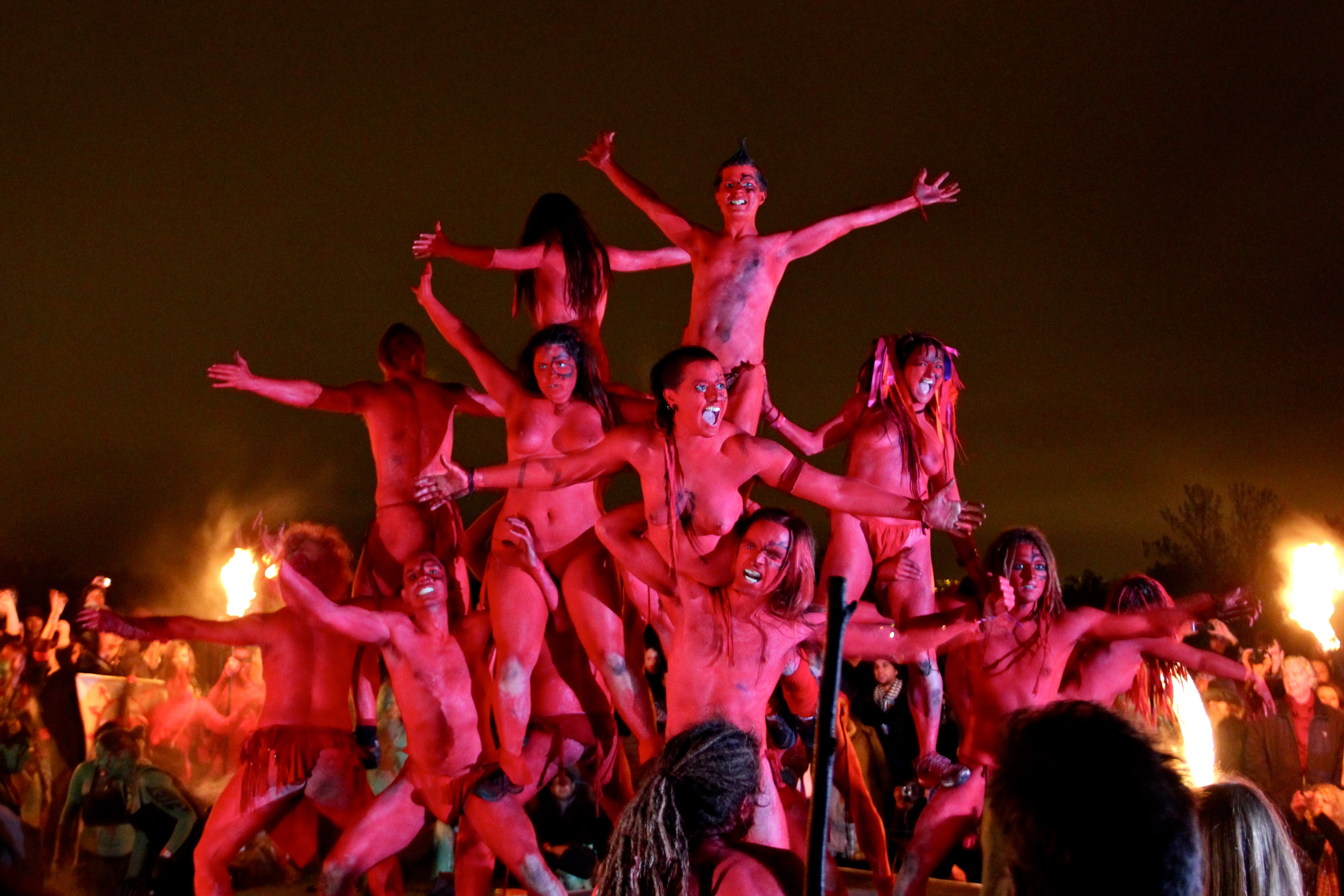
The Reds

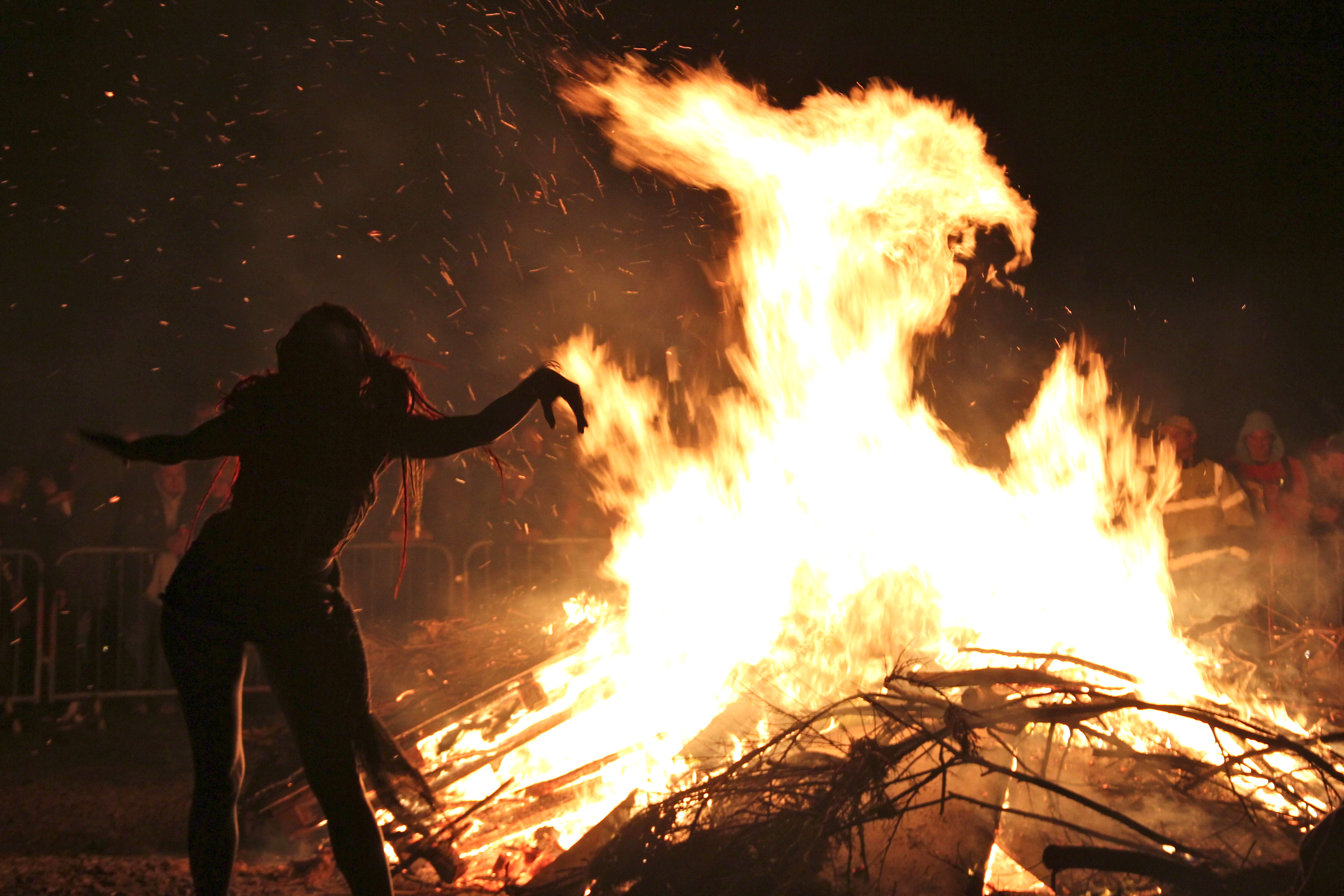
The Bonfire lit to welcome the Beltane morning with a ritual dancer
