= Beltane Fire Society =

The Beltane Fire Society is a charity run by a board of volunteers, who oversee the year-round operation of the organisation responsible for the Beltane Fire Festival. The society is funded entirely by donations through its membership, from Beltane Fire Festival ticket sales, and from merchandising. It receives no donations from any public funds.

The Beltane Fire Society organises the Beltane Fire Festival on Calton Hill and the Samhuinn Fire Festival on the Royal Mile, both in Edinburgh, Scotland. The society was formed in 1988 for the second Beltane Fire Festival (the first on Calton Hill). The Beltane Fire Society also organises events for the other Celtic cross-quarter days, i.e., Imbolc and Lughnasadh and Samhuinn.

== Gallery ==
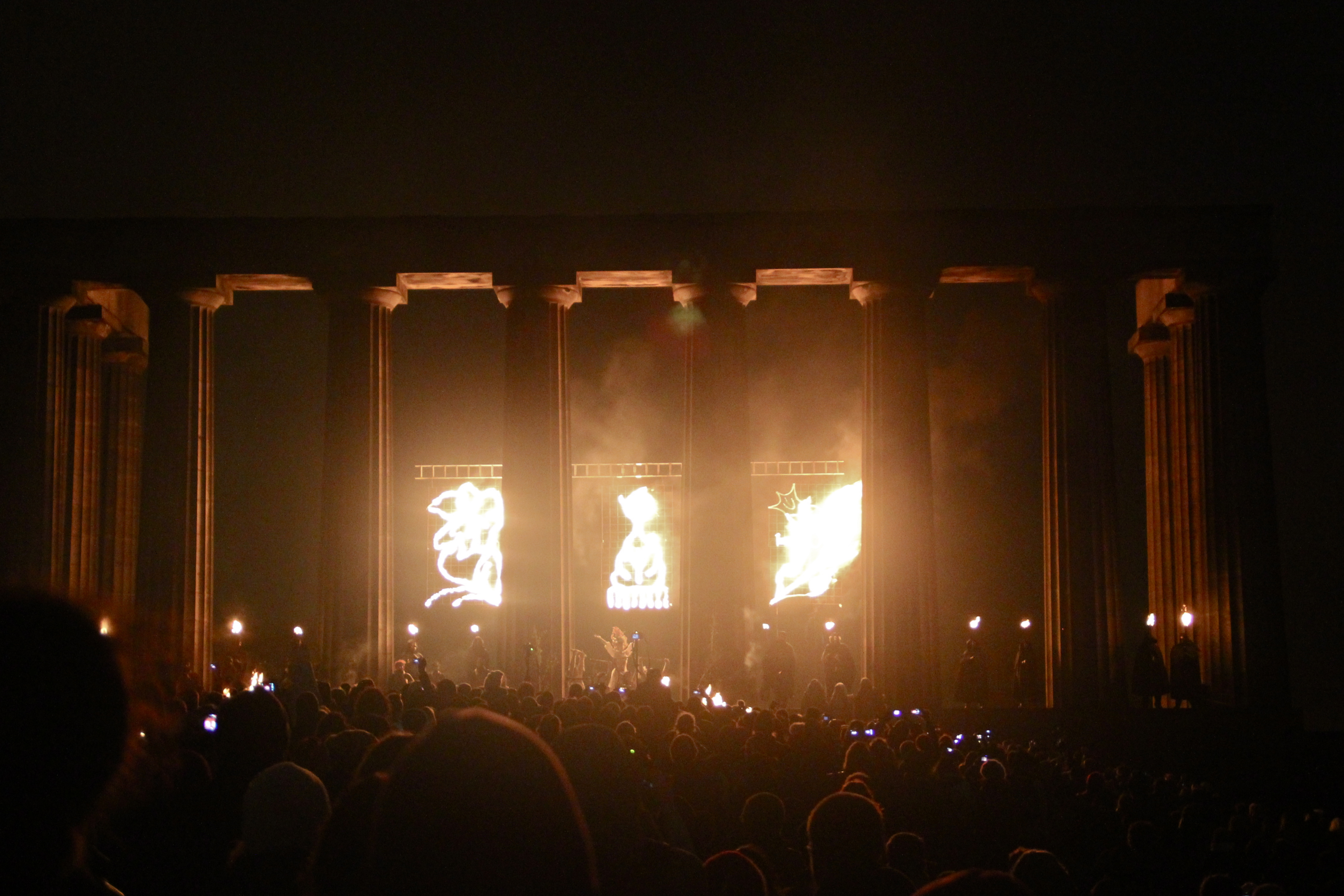
The Edinburgh Beltane Fire Festival in front of the National Monument of Scotland

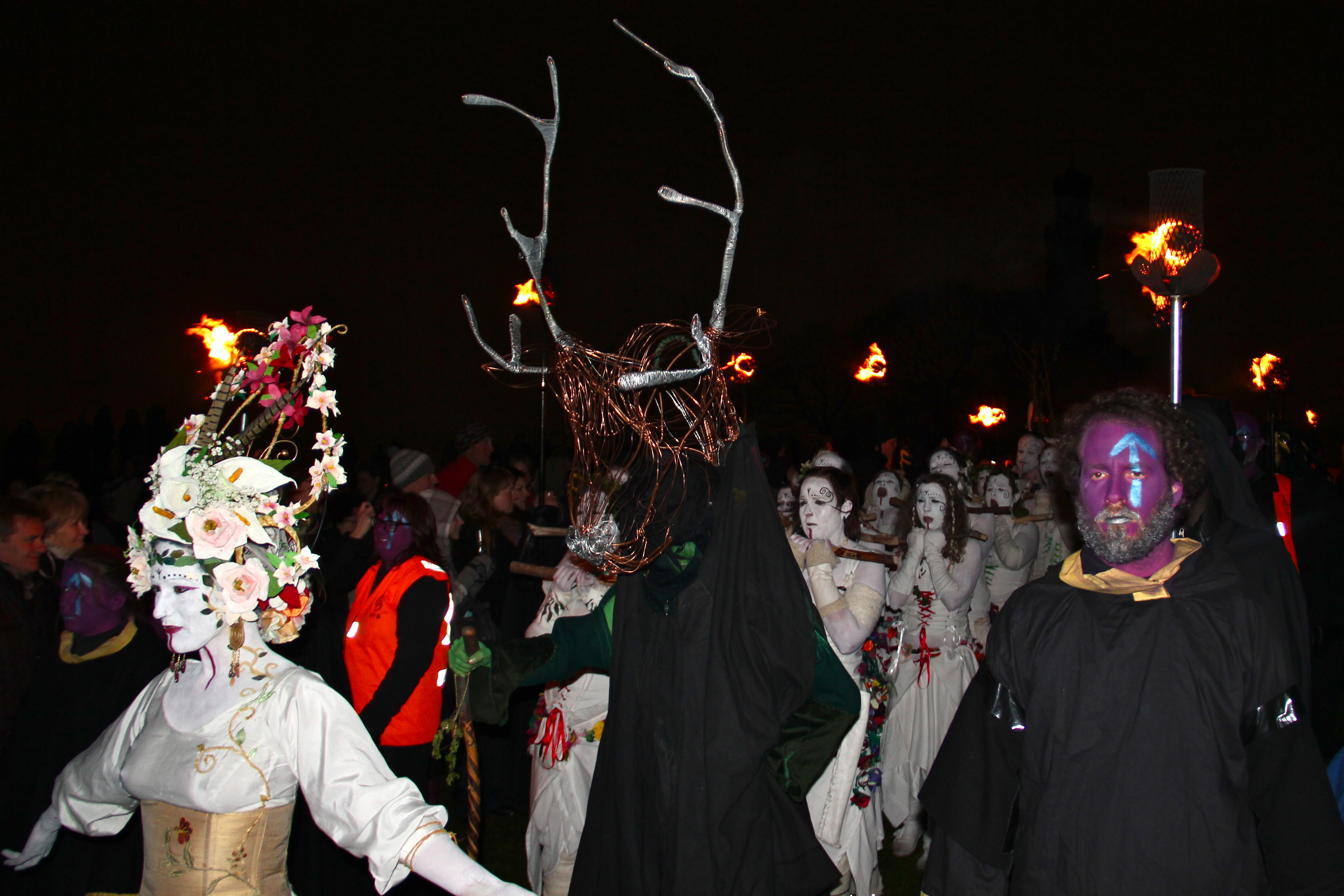
The May Queen leads the procession

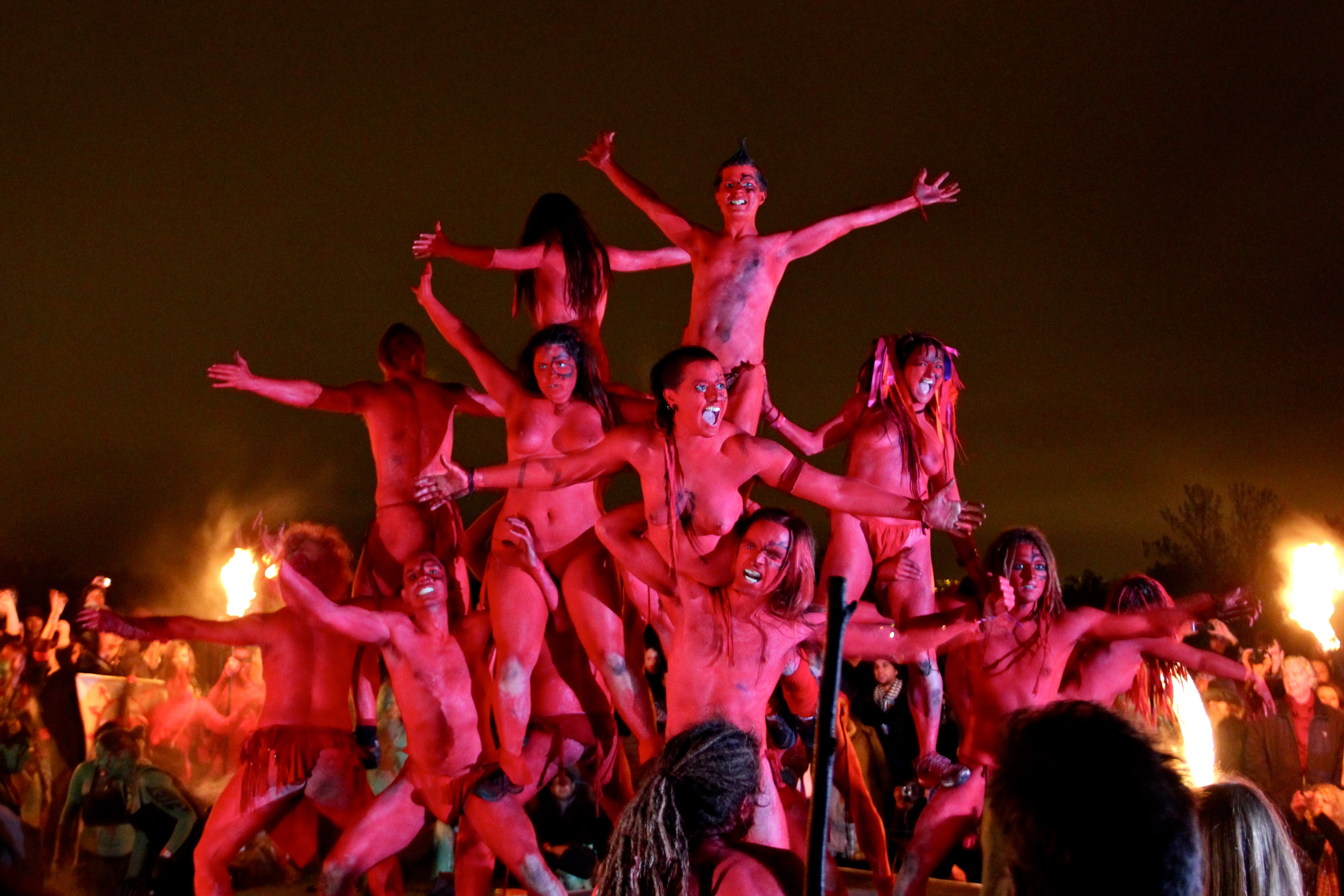
The Red Beastie Drummers

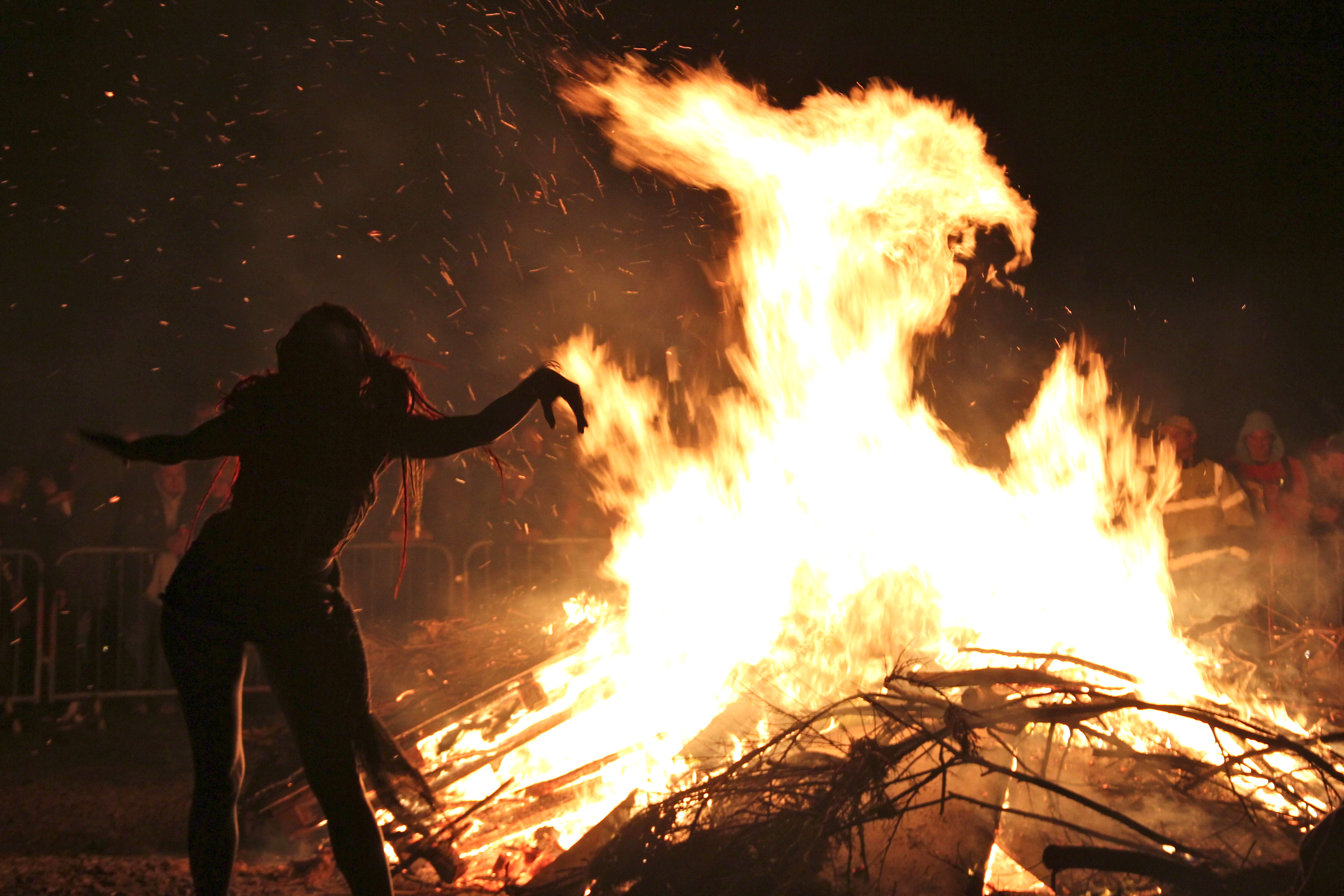
A Bonfire lit to welcome the Beltane morning on Calton Hill
