= Dance Umbrella =

Dance Umbrella is an annual festival of modern and contemporary dance in London every October, founded by Val Bourne and Jeremy Alliger.

First held in 1978, companies such as London Contemporary Dance Theatre, Merce Cunningham Dance Company, Siobhan Davies Dance Company, Shen Wei Dance Arts perform at venues across London including the Queen Elizabeth Hall, The Place, Battersea Arts Centre and the Barbican Theatre.
